= Ramiz Tahirov =

Azerbaijani military officer (born 1966)

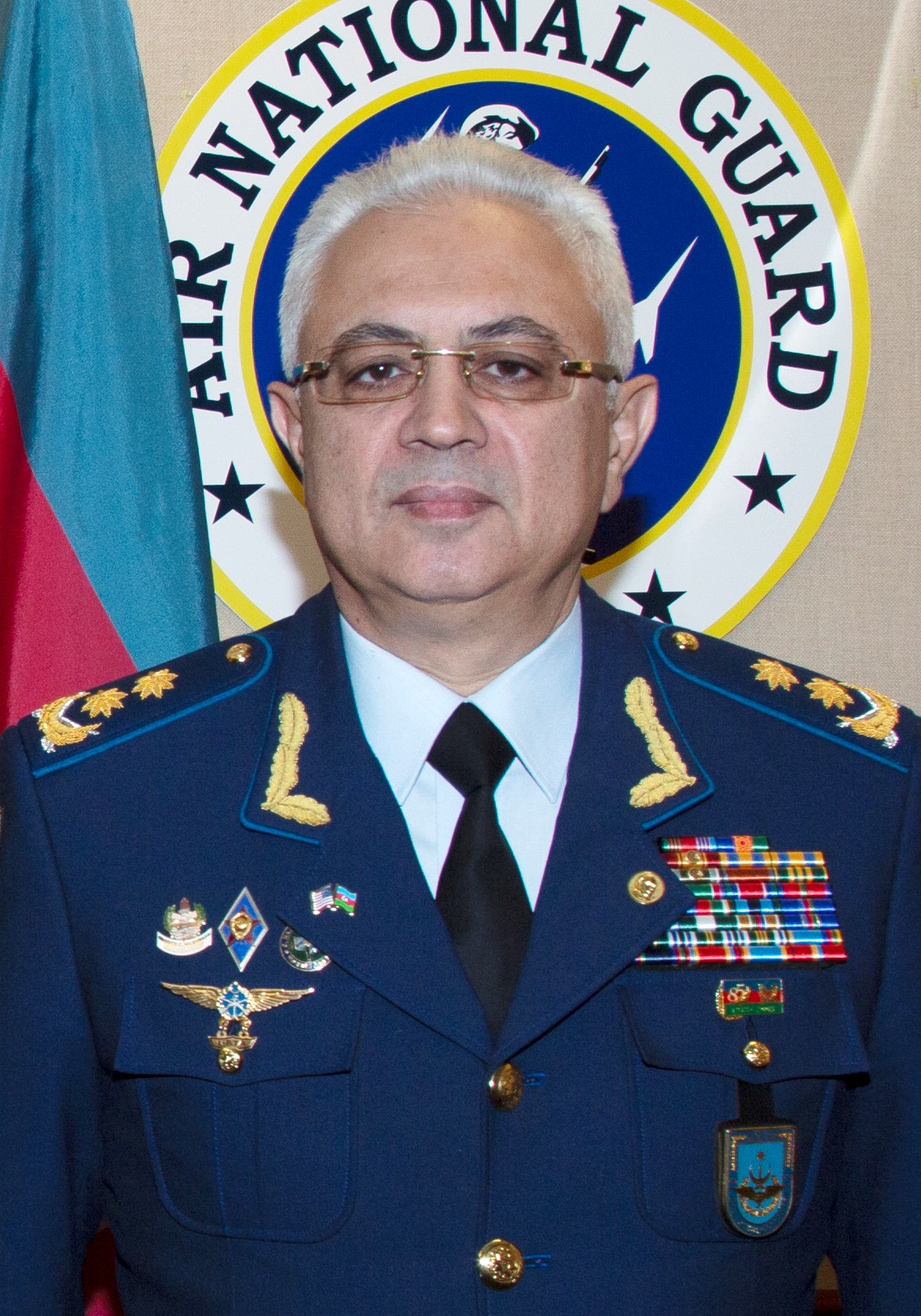
- Native name: Ramiz Firudin oğlu Tahirov
- Born: April 16, 1966 (age 60); Vladikavkaz, North Ossetian ASSR, RSFSR, Soviet Union
- Allegiance: Soviet Union; Azerbaijan
- Branch: Strategic Rocket Forces; Azerbaijani Air Force
- Service years: 1988–1992; 1992–2024
- Rank: Lieutenant general
- Conflicts: Four-Day War; Tovuz clashes; Second Nagorno-Karabakh War
- Awards: For military services medal; Zafar Order

Ramiz Firudin oglu Tahirov (Azerbaijani: Ramiz Firudin oğlu Tahirov; born 1966) is an Azerbaijani military officer, serving as the lieutenant general in the Azerbaijani Armed Forces. He is the Commander of the Azerbaijani Air Forces and Air Defence and the Deputy Minister of Defence of Azerbaijan since May 2014. Tahirov had taken part in the 2020 Nagorno-Karabakh war.

== Early life ==
Ramiz Firudin oglu Tahirov was born on 16 April 1966, in Ordzhonikidze, the capital of the North Ossetian ASSR, which was then part of the RSFSR, Soviet Union. He graduated from the Military Lyceum named after Jamshid Nakchivanski in 1983. Later, Tahirov continued his education at the Kiev Higher Anti-Aircraft Missile Engineering School and was graduated in 1988.

== Military service ==
From 1988 to 1992, he served in the Soviet Armed Forces at the Vasilevsky Military Academy of Army Air Defence Forces and in the military representation of the USSR. In 1992–2002, he served in the Armed Forces of the Republic of Azerbaijan. In 2002–2013, he worked as Deputy Assistant to the President of the Republic of Azerbaijan for defence issues. By order of President Ilham Aliyev on May 14, 2014, he was appointed Deputy Minister of Defense - Commander of the Air Force. On April 29, 2024, he was relieved of his post and was released from active military service.

== Personal life ==
Ramiz Tahirov is married and has two children.

== Awards ==
- Tahirov was awarded the Zafar Order in 2020, by the order of the President Aliyev.
- "For the Motherland" (24.06.2005)
- "For Military Services" medal (21.06.2007)
- "For Services to the Motherland" Order of the 3rd degree (24.06.2015)
- "For Military Services" medal (19.04.2016)
