= Ahmed Metani =

Palestinian politician, diplomat and writer (born 1980)

Ahmed Musa Ibrahim Metani
- أحمد موسى إبراهيم ميتاني

Ambassador of the State of Palestine to Azerbaijan
- Incumbent
- Assumed office April 16, 2025

Personal details
- Born: December 3, 1980 (age 45) Immatain, Nablus, Palestine
- Occupation: Diplomat, politician, writer

Ahmed Mousa Ibrahim Metani (Arabic: أحمد موسى إبراهيم ميتاني; born December 3, 1980) is a Palestinian politician, diplomat, and writer. He currently serves as the Ambassador of the State of Palestine to the Republic of Azerbaijan since April 16, 2025. He previously held several diplomatic posts in Malaysia, Indonesia, and the Philippines, focusing on consular, cultural, commercial, and educational affairs.

== Early life and education ==
Ahmed Metani was born on December 3, 1980, in the village of Immatain near Nablus, Palestine. He studied at King Talal School in Nablus and completed his primary and secondary education in his hometown. He obtained a bachelor's degree from An-Najah National University in Palestine and later earned both a Master's and a PhD in E-Commerce from the University of Science in Malaysia. In his youth, Metani was a professional volleyball player in Palestine before pursuing a diplomatic career.

=== Personal life ===
Metani is married with three children.

== Diplomatic career ==
Metani joined the Palestinian diplomatic service in the early 2000s and served in several countries:

- Malaysia (2005–2017): Worked at the Embassy of Palestine in Kuala Lumpur for 12 years, covering consular, cultural, and commercial affairs. Oversaw neighboring countries such as Thailand, Brunei, and the Maldives, organized cultural exhibitions, and collaborated with NGOs and universities.
- Indonesia (2017–2025): Served as Deputy Ambassador in Jakarta for 8 years, engaging in initiatives related to educational and humanitarian cooperation.
- Philippines : Acted as Chargé d'Affaires of the Palestinian Embassy in Manila.
- Azerbaijan (2025–present): Presented credentials as Ambassador of Palestine to Azerbaijan on April 16, 2025.

Metani focuses on political, economic, cultural, and humanitarian cooperation, and represents Palestinian positions within international organizations, including the United Nations and the Organization of Islamic Cooperation.

== Academic work and publications ==
Metani has published research in international journals, notably "Social Psychology Theories Be Applied to Achieve Strategic Political Objective", discussing the application of psychology in political strategy.

He is also a novelist. His Arabic novel الأستاذ نعمان: رسالة الحياة (English: Professor Naaman: Life's Message) explores intellectual tolerance, acceptance of diversity, and coexistence.

== See also ==
- Foreign relations of Palestine
- Azerbaijan–Palestine relations

== Literature ==
- Diplomatic and Consular List (PDF). Kuala Lumpur: Ministry of Foreign Affairs, Malaysia. 2014.
- Ministry of Foreign Affairs (2013). Diplomatic & Consular List (PDF). Bandar Seri Begawan.
