= Nasosnaya Air Base =

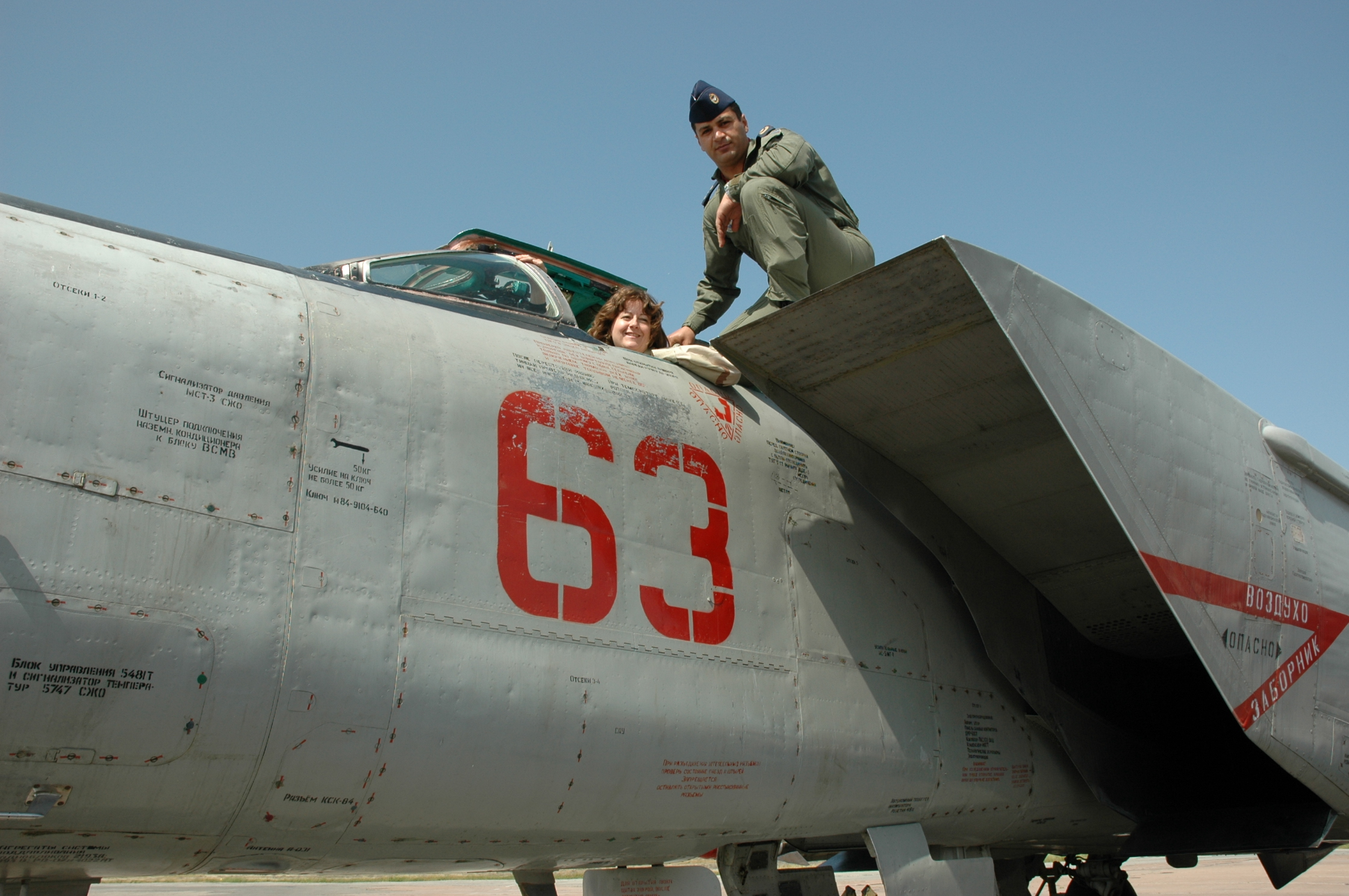
- MiG-25 at Nasosnaya
- IATA: 8IT; ICAO: UBBI

Summary
- Airport type: Military
- Operator: Azerbaijani Air Force
- Location: Nasosnaya, Azerbaijan
- Elevation AMSL: −13 ft (−4.0 m)
- Coordinates: 40°35′29″N 049°33′26″E

Map
- Location in Azerbaijan

Runways
Direction	Length		Surface
Direction	m	ft	Surface
17/35	2,505	8,218	Concrete
- Source: DAFIF

Nasosnaya Air Base is a military airbase in the municipality of Hacı Zeynalabdin, near the city of Sumqayit in Azerbaijan.

In July 1940, the 50th Fighter Aviation Regiment became part of the 27th Fighter Aviation Division of the Transcaucasus (ZKVO) Air Force at the Nasosnaya airfield. Two squadrons re-equipped from I-15bis to Polikarpov I-153 biplane fighters.

The 82nd Fighter Aviation Regiment PVO of the Soviet Air Defence Forces was stationed at the base for decades, possibly since 1945. Since 1977 it flew Mikoyan-Gurevich MiG-25 long-range interceptors.

Overnight on 9-10 June 1992, large numbers of Soviet aircraft were flown from what was now Azerbaijan to Russian territory. Azerbaijan however managed to completely capture the 38 Mikoyan-Gurevich MiG-25PDS fighter-interceptors of the 82nd Fighter Aviation Regiment of the Air Defence Forces at the Nasosny airfield, as well as five MiG-25P and MiG-25RB aircraft that were being repaired at the 210th Aviation Repair Plant of the Air Defence Forces located there.

The 82nd Fighter Aviation Regiment may have been disbanded in 1993, but MiG-25s continued to be operated by the Azerbaijani Air and Air Defence Force for several years afterwards.

== See also ==
- List of airports in Azerbaijan
