= Yeni Daşkənd =

- Municipality
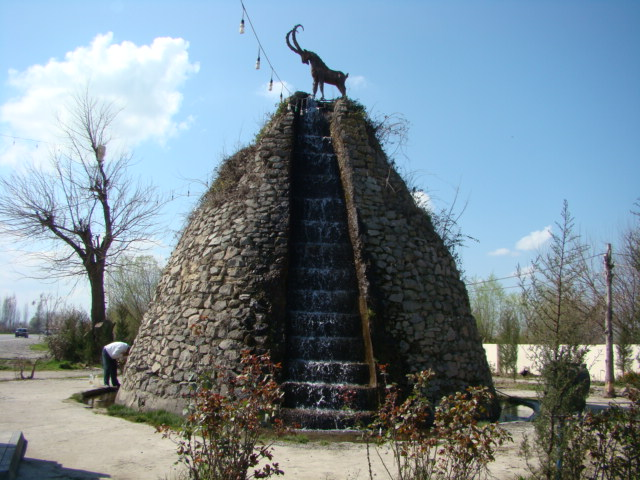

- Location within Azerbaijan Location within Karabakh Economic Region
- Coordinates: 40°23′09″N 47°02′10″E
- Country: Azerbaijan
- Rayon: Barda

Population (2009)
  - Total: 2,498
- Time zone: UTC+4 (AZT)
  - Summer (DST): UTC+5 (AZT)

Yeni Daşkənd is a village and municipality in the Barda Rayon of Azerbaijan. It has a population of 2,498 (2009).

== Notable people ==
- Samir Safarov, Azerbaijani military officer, lieutenant colonel serving in the Azerbaijani Armed Forces.
- Namig Islamzadeh, Azerbaijani military officer, lieutenant general serving as Commander of the Azerbaijani Air Forces.
