= Commander of the Air Force (Azerbaijan) =

Rank of the Azerbaijani Air Force

- Hərbi Hava Qüvvələri Komandanı
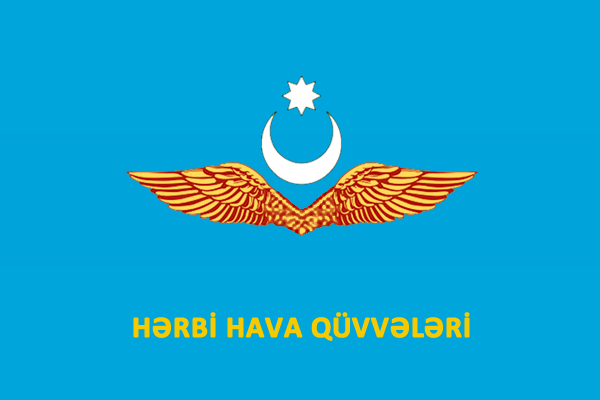
- Air Force Flag of Azerbaijan

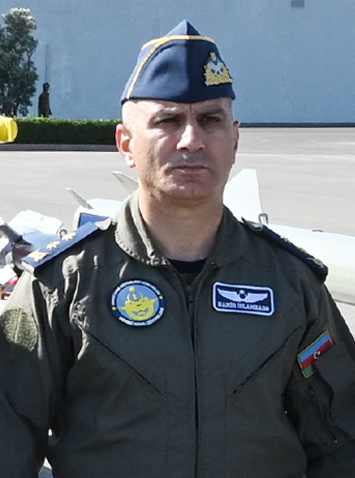
- Incumbent; Namig Islamzadeh since 23 September 2024
- Ministry of Defence
- Member of: General Staff of Azerbaijani Armed Forces
- Reports to: Chief of the General Staff
- Formation: 1993
- First holder: Rail Rzayev
- Deputy: Deputy commander of the Air Force

The Commander of the Azerbaijani Air Force (Azerbaijani: Hərbi Hava Qüvvələri Komandanı) is the head of the aviation and the administrative head in the Azerbaijani Air Force, and is under the Chief of the General Staff and the Minister of Defence. The current Commander of the Air Force is Lieutenant General Ramiz Tahirov.

== List of commanders ==
No.	Portrait	Chief of the Azerbaijani Air Force	Took office	Left office	Time in office	Ref.
1	Rail Rzayev	Lieutenant General; Rail Rzayev (1945–2009)	1993	11 February 2009 †	15–16 years	.
2	Altay Mehdiyev	Major general Altay Mehdiyev	12 May 2009	18 November 2013	4 years, 190 days	
3	Ramiz Tahirov	Lieutenant general Ramiz Tahirov	14 May 2014	23 September 2024	12 years, 116 days	
4	Namig Islamzadeh	Lieutenant general Namig Islamzadeh	23 September 2024	Incumbent	1 year, 349 days	
