= Azerbaijan–Israel relations =

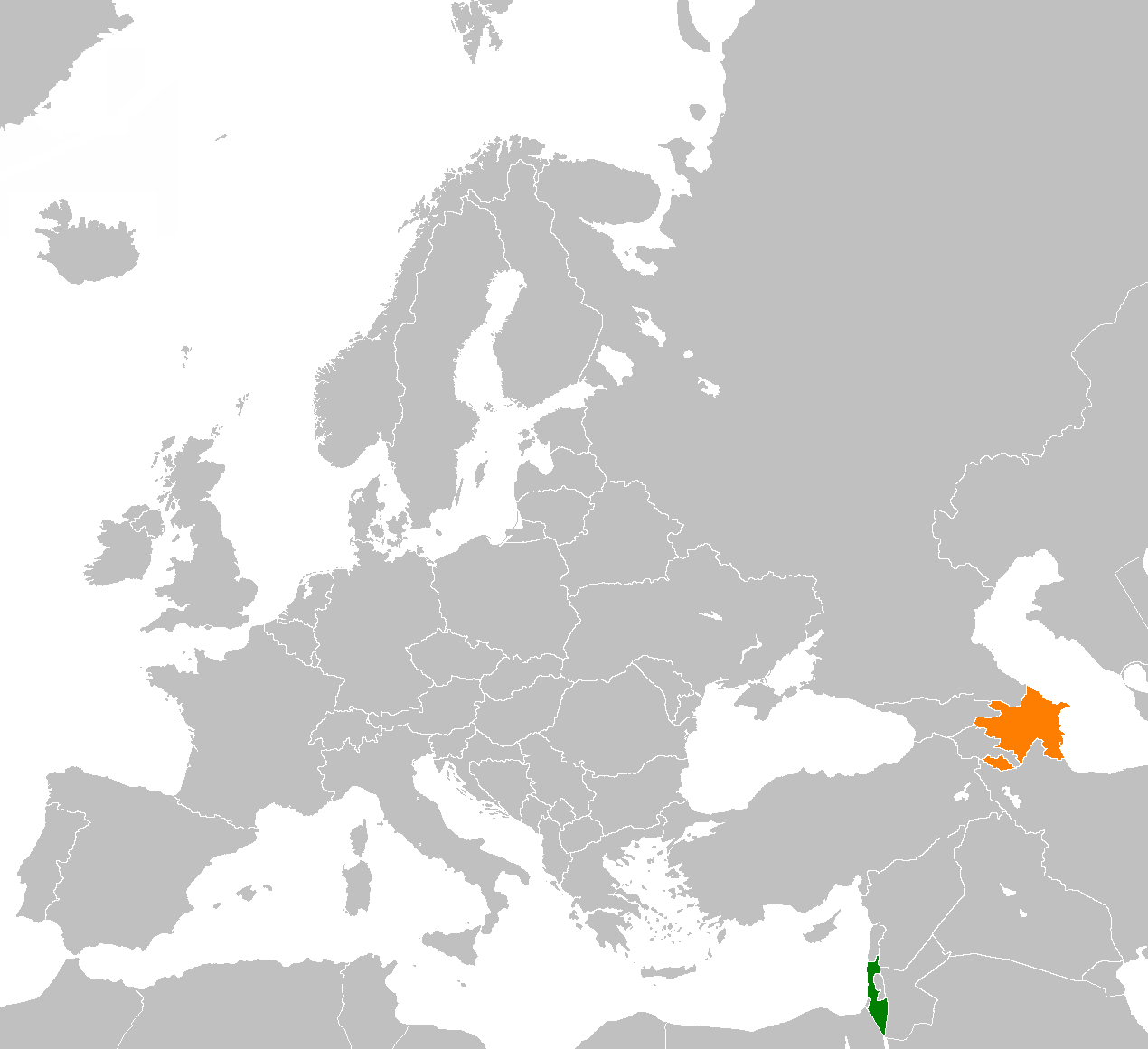

- Israel: Azerbaijan

Diplomatic mission
- Embassy of Israel, Baku: Embassy of Azerbaijan, Tel Aviv

Envoy
- Ambassador George Deek: Ambassador Mukhtar Mammadov

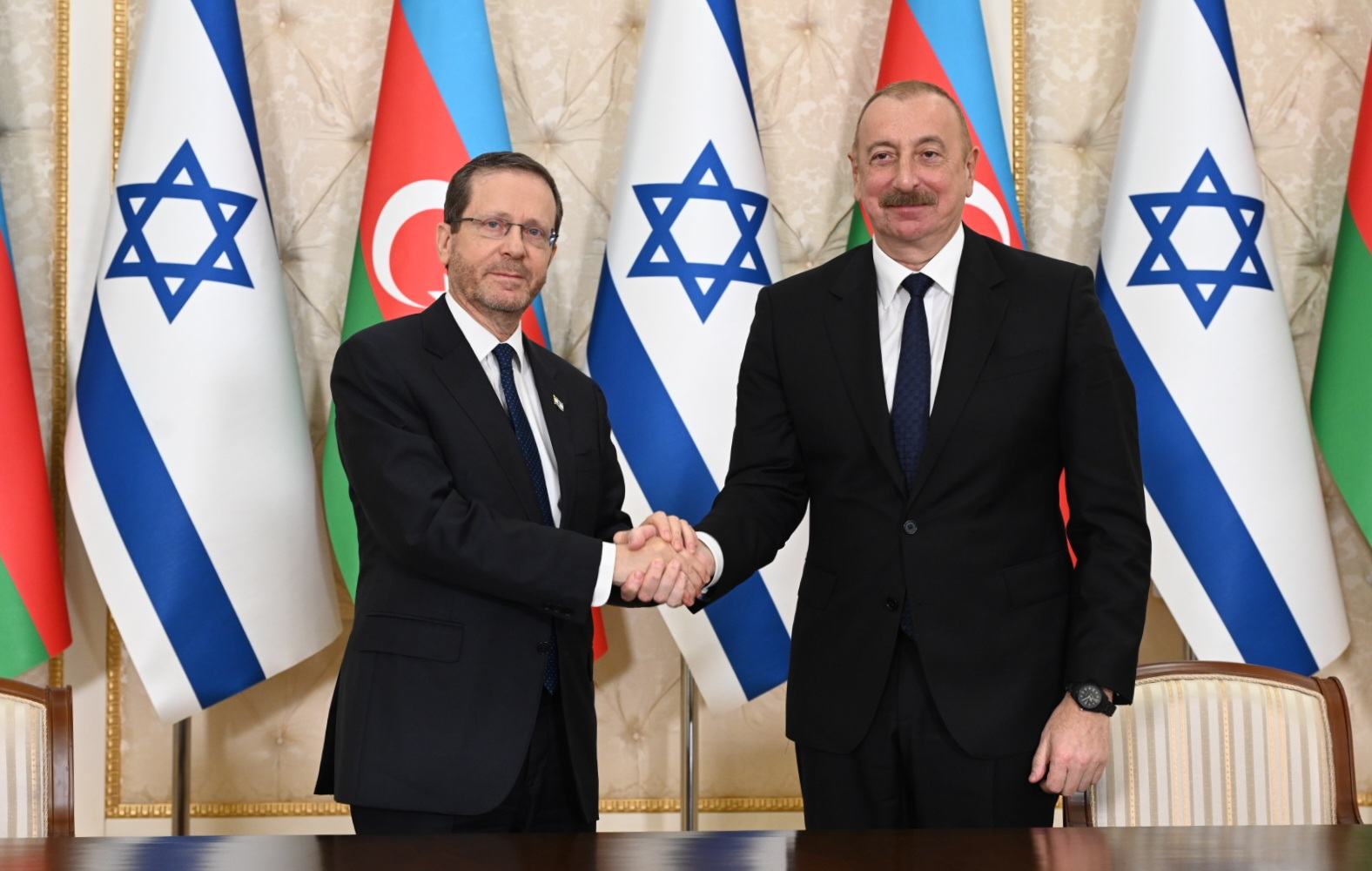
Azerbaijan's President Ilham Aliyev and Israeli President Isaac Herzog in Baku, May 2023

Azerbaijan and Israel began diplomatic relations in 1992 following Azerbaijan's independence from the Soviet Union. The relationship between Israel and Azerbaijan avoids overt military bases or formal alliance frameworks, instead operating through a deliberately low-profile strategy centered on arms transfers, intelligence collaboration, and sustained technological integration in the defense sector.

Azerbaijan has been strengthening its ties with Israel since 2011, and in 2022, it announced that it would be opening an embassy in Israel, marking the 30th anniversary of diplomatic relations between the two states.

Since the 1990s, Azerbaijan has played a vital role in Israel's regional security and energy strategies. In 2019, Azerbaijan supplied over 60% of the gasoline consumed in Israel. Additionally, Azerbaijan serves as Israel’s most significant partner among Muslim-majority nations, with both countries maintaining strong cooperation in defense, intelligence, and trade. According to security analyst, Gershon Kogan, Azerbaijan is Israel's "most consequential partner in the South Caucasus."

During the ongoing Gaza war, Azerbaijan was reported as one of the only Muslim-majority country supporting Israel. Despite pressure from other Muslim nations, Azerbaijani leadership maintained its strategic partnership with Israel.

== History ==
=== Early years ===
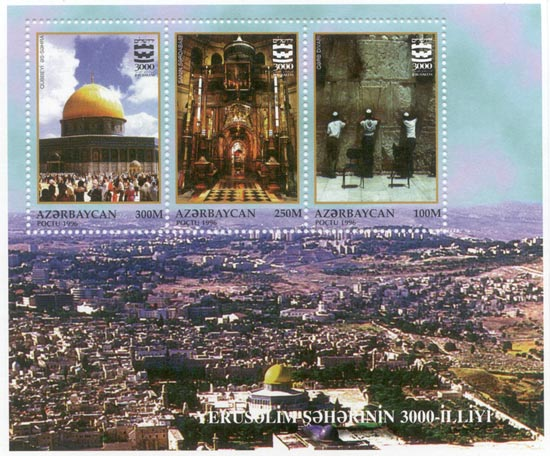
Azerbaijani stamp commemorating the 3000th anniversary of Jerusalem.

On 18 October 1991, the declaration of the Parliament of Azerbaijan restored the country's independence, and in November 1991 Turkey became the first state to formally recognise it. On 25 December 1991, Israel formally recognised the independence of Azerbaijan, becoming one of the first states to do so, and established diplomatic relations with the country on 7 April 1992. During the Nagorno-Karabakh conflict between Armenia and Azerbaijan, Israel funded and provided weapons and artillery to Azerbaijan.

Azerbaijan is home to some 30,000 Jews, residing primarily in Baku and the Qırmızı Qəsəbə settlement in the Quba district of Azerbaijan. Mountain Jews have been living in Azerbaijan for close to 1,500 years; they are the descendants of Persian Jews. During the conquest by the Islamic Caliphate, Arabs settled an allied Jewish tribe in the neighbourhoods of Baku; in 1730, Jews were officially allowed the right of residence and property ownership in Quba. There are also nearly 5,000 Ashkenazi Jews living mostly in Baku. The first Jewish Sochnut school in the Soviet Union was opened in 1982 in Baku, then capital of Azerbaijan SSR.

By 1998, internal documents of Israel’s Ministry of Foreign Affairs identified Azerbaijan as a “key state” in the region, emphasising its strategic importance to Israel’s regional policy.

=== 21st century ===
Since the late 2000s, Azerbaijan has been one of the largest importers of Israeli military technology. Over the 2010s, Israeli supplies accounted for 60–69% of Azerbaijan's total military imports.

According to a 2009 leaked U.S. diplomatic cable, Azerbaijan's President Ilham Aliyev once compared his country's relationship with Israel to an iceberg: "Nine-tenths of it is below the surface."

In 2009, Israeli President Shimon Peres made a visit to Azerbaijan where military relations were expanded further, with the Israeli company Aeronautics Defense Systems Ltd announcing it would build a factory in Baku.

Azerbaijan was visited by David Harris, executive director of the American Jewish Committee, in July 2010, shortly after the visit of Hillary Clinton to Baku. During the reception, Harris referred to Azerbaijan's cultural, strategic and political importance.

In 2010, President Aliyev issued a decree banning the issue of visas at the country's international airports; foreigners henceforth had to apply for visas at the nearest Azerbaijani consulate. Israel and Turkey were the only two countries whose citizens were unaffected by the new law.

In 2016, Israel's Defence Minister Avigdor Lieberman supported the position of Azerbaijan in the 2016 Nagorno-Karabakh conflict, calling it "absolutely justified". Furthermore, Lieberman held Armenia responsible for provoking the conflict in April 2016.

A delegation of the World Jewish Congress visited Azerbaijan in September 2016; during the talks with President Aliyev emphasis was put on "excellent" relations with Israel and the Jewish community.

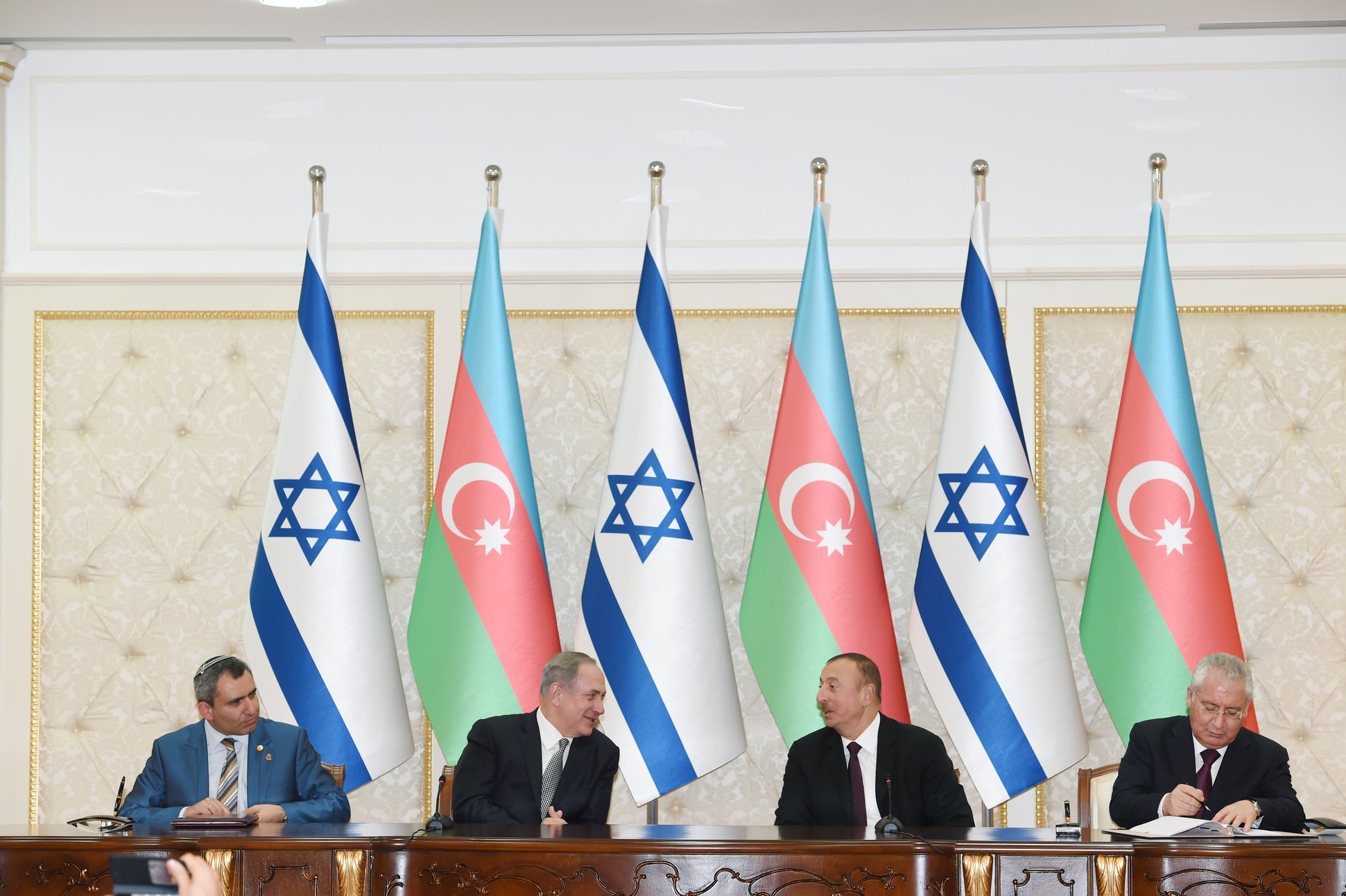
Israeli Prime Minister Benjamin Netanyahu and Azerbaijan's President Ilham Aliyev in Baku, December 2016

In December 2016, Israeli Prime Minister Benjamin Netanyahu paid an official visit to Baku. During the visit he emphasized that "Israel and Azerbaijan enjoy an excellent relationship and warm friendship". During the visit Netanyahu visited the Alley of Martyrs and paid tribute to Azerbaijani heroes. He also visited the Ohr Avner Chabad Day School, met with the local Jewish community and gave a speech before students. Press statements made by the President Aliyev and Prime Minister Netanyahu also showed satisfaction with bilateral cooperation. Later that month, the Azerbaijan-Israel intergovernmental agreement on air communication was signed.

In December 2016, Israeli journalist Alexander Lapshin was arrested in Belarus at the request of Azerbaijan due to his visit to Nagorno-Karabakh. Despite protests from Israel, the Council of Europe, the UN Human Rights Committee and human rights organizations, Lapshin was extradited to Azerbaijan. By decision of the Baku criminal court he was sentenced to 3 years in prison. Immediately after the trial, under unclear circumstances, the journalist was assaulted by fellow inmates in prison, as a result of which he was taken to the hospital in critical condition. Immediately after this incident, the President of Azerbaijan issued a decree pardoning the convicted Israeli. Later, by a decision of the European Court of Human Rights dated May 21, 2021, the Azerbaijani authorities were found guilty of illegal arrest, cruel torture and organizing an attempted murder against Lapshin.

Azerbaijan was visited by John Shapiro, executive director of the American Jewish Committee, in January 2017, shortly after the visit of Benjamin Netanyahu to Baku. During the reception, Shapiro said that constructive partnership between Azerbaijan, United States, and Israel has a big significance.

In 2017, an Azerbaijani laundromat money-laundering scheme organized by Azerbaijan was uncovered, revealing that, between 2012 and 2014, Azerbaijan created a slush fund of $2.9 billion used to bribe European and American politicians, journalists, lawmakers, and academics to lobby for Azerbaijani interests abroad. One of the primary agendas of the laundromat was to portray Azerbaijan as "a role model for multicultural tolerance". In particular, Israeli and Jewish organizations in the United States and Europe were used to present Azerbaijan as "a trusted Muslim partner of Israel and the Jewish people". German and French lobbyists bribed by the laundromat frequently sought to portray Azerbaijan as a friend of Israel. The Podesta Group, an American lobbying firm paid $60,000 per month by the Azerbaijani government, contacted pro-Israel groups such as AIPAC and JINSA on behalf of Azerbaijan.

April 2017 marked the 25th anniversary of the establishment of diplomatic ties between Israel and Azerbaijan. A congratulatory letter to the President of Azerbaijan Ilham Aliyev from the Israeli Prime Minister Benjamin Netanyahu included:

Israel is proud to have been one of the first nations to recognize the independent Republic of Azerbaijan. In the quarter-century since, our countries have built a solid relationship based on genuine friendship between the Jewish and Azerbaijani peoples. ... Azerbaijan is a model of inter-faith and multicultural harmony in an area fraught with religious and ethnic rivalries. Like you, Israel is a beacon of stability and tolerance in an unstable region. Despite the challenges we face, we have both succeeded in creating thriving economies and vibrant, prosperous and peace-seeking societies.

Israeli–Azerbaijani ties strengthened since the very early 1990s. The strategic relationship included cooperation in trade and security matters, cultural and educational exchanges, etc. Relations entered a new phase in August 1997 during the visit of the then Israeli prime minister Benjamin Netanyahu to Baku. Since then Israel has been developing closer ties with Azerbaijan and has helped modernize the Armed Forces of Azerbaijan. The Israeli military has been a major provider of battlefield aviation, artillery, anti-tank, and anti-infantry weaponry to Azerbaijan.

In March 2017, several regional tours were made by the Israeli envoy to Azerbaijan to deepen economic cooperation in the spheres of economy, agriculture, and tourism: Azerbaijan and Israel abolished double taxation between the two countries in April 2017.

During his speech at the 72nd session of the UN General Assembly on September 19, 2017, Netanyahu mentioned the expansion of cooperation between the two countries.

In January 2019, the State Border Service of Azerbaijan purchased SkyStriker kamikazes from Israel's Elbit Systems. Azerbaijan became the first foreign buyer of SkyStrikers.

During the 2020 Nagorno-Karabakh war with Armenia, Azerbaijan deployed Israeli-made weapons on Armenian targets. In March 2023 Azerbaijan opened its embassy in Israel.

In February 2024, Azerbaijani President Aliyev met with Israeli President Herzog, reaffirming bilateral relations between Israel and Azerbaijan amid the ongoing Gaza war. Azerbaijan is a major oil supplier to Israel and has resisted pressure to cut ties with Israel over the Gaza war.

In January 2026, Israeli and Azerbaijani officials met in Baku to discuss ongoing cooperation in digital development and transport. The meeting involved Azerbaijan’s Deputy Minister of Digital Development and Transport Samir Mammadov and Israeli Ambassador Ronen Krausz, who reviewed progress since the fourth session of the bilateral joint commission held in November 2025.

During the talks, the sides exchanged updates on existing cooperation projects, including the Azerbaijan Cybersecurity Center and the Vistar Center of Excellence established with Israeli partners in the aerospace and technology sectors. They also discussed future priority areas such as digitalisation of transport, urban mobility, artificial intelligence, innovation and startup support, and human capital development, building on earlier collaboration between the two countries in cybersecurity and advanced technologies.

Analysts describe Azerbaijan and Israel as trusted partners whose relationship extends beyond traditional energy and defense cooperation into expanding technology, innovation, and digital sectors, reinforcing both countries’ economic diversification and strategic ties in the 2020s.

== Armenian genocide recognition ==
Historically, Israel took Azerbaijan's side, out of geopolitical concerns with Iran, and thus, also actively lobbies to reject the recognition of the Armenian genocide. However, Israel's relationship with Azerbaijan has suffered several downturns in recent years, in part due to the spillover of the increasingly hostile Israel–Turkey relations. Turkey is Azerbaijan's closest ally, with both share the same Oghuz Turkic ethnicities and similar in refusing recognition of the Armenian genocide; similarly, Baku has taken side of Ankara whenever coming to this dispute, even if Baku has sometimes opted to stay on the middle ground due to the country's position as the checkpoint against Russian and Iranian influences.

In 2026, after Prime Minister Benjamin Netanyahu actively discussed about recognising the Armenian genocide, Azerbaijan had reacted angrily and denounced the attempt; later intervention from Azerbaijani officials prevented it from being raised at the Knesset, but this also undermined the long friendly relationship between Baku and Jerusalem. Previously, Azerbaijan had considered any recognition of the genocide as a "red line".

== Security relations ==
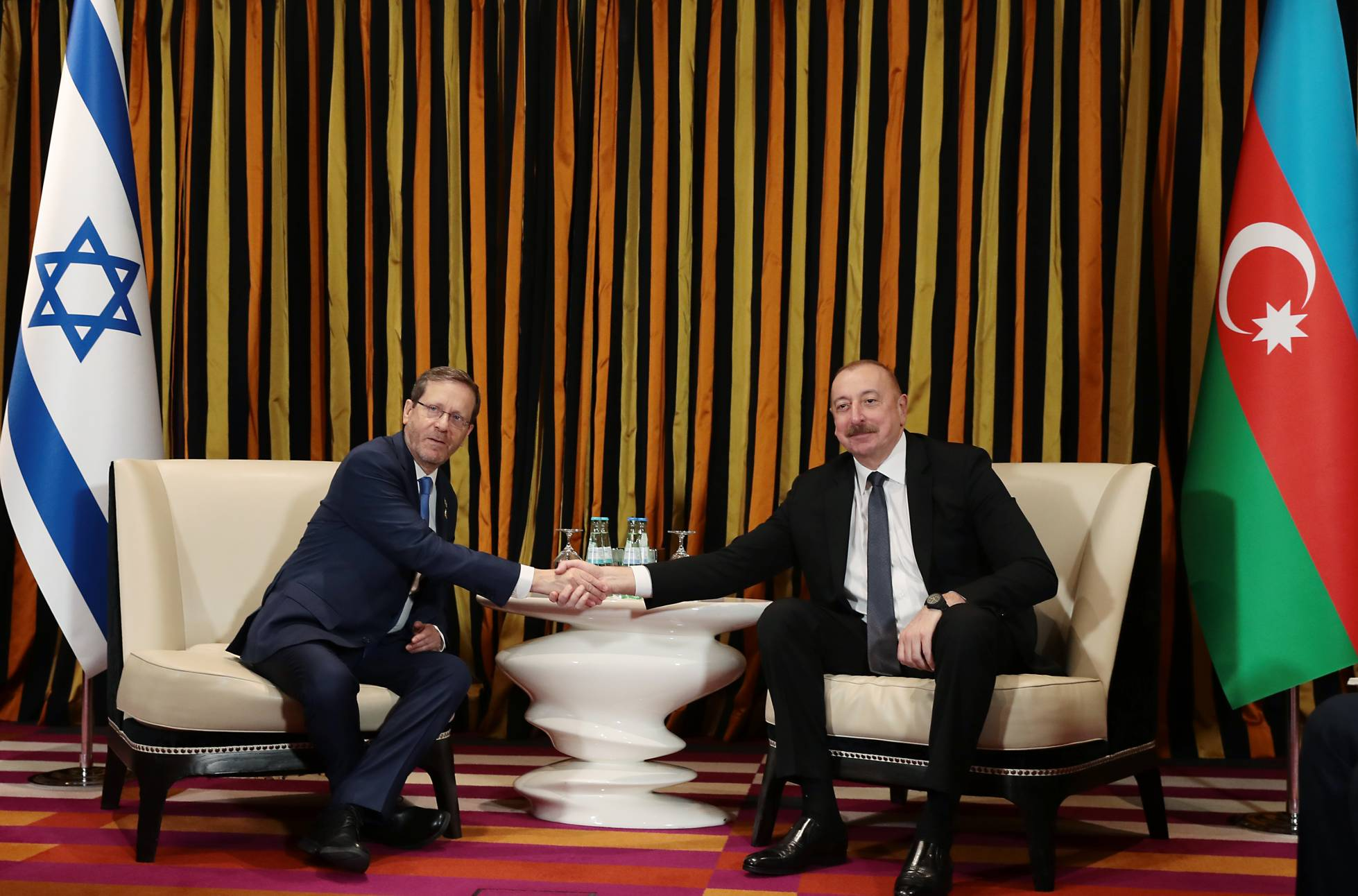
Azerbaijani President Aliyev with Israeli President Herzog at the 60th Munich Security Conference, 16 February 2024

Following an October 2001 meeting with Israeli ambassador Eitan Naeh, Azerbaijan's then-president Heydar Aliyev declared that the two countries had identical positions in the fight against international terrorism. Israeli intelligence helps collect human intelligence about what they view as extremist organizations in the region. One of the groups, Hizb ut-Tahrir, which seeks the annihilation of the state of Israel, threatens both Jerusalem and Baku. Hizb ut-Tahrir is suspected of having several hundred members in Azerbaijan, and several its members were arrested and prosecuted by Azerbaijani authorities.

In 2008, a plot was foiled to bomb the Israeli Embassy in Baku, which is located in a high-rise building along with the Thai and Japanese embassies. Two Hezbollah militants went on trial for the attempt in May 2009. Local police narrowly averted the potential disaster, which involved placing three or four car bombs around the high-rise complex to carry out the attack. Groups planned the bombing in retaliation for the 2008 assassination in Damascus, Syria of Hezbollah's second in command Imad Mughniyah, which the Lebanese group blamed on Israel. News reports suggested Iran was involved in the plan as well.

The Begin-Sadat Center for Strategic Studies has identified Azerbaijan as a key pillar of Israel's regional security framework. The center noted that Azerbaijan's long-standing partnership with Israel could play an important role in expanding the Abraham Accords to include additional Muslim-majority countries during potential future U.S. administrations.

=== Alleged cooperation against Iran ===
Some analysts consider that both Israel and Azerbaijan see Iran as an existential threat. Azerbaijan fears Iranian Islamist influence, but Iran fears Azerbaijani separatism, too, as up to 18 million Iranians are ethnic Azeris. Israel’s choice of Azerbaijan as a security partner stems from its long shared border with Iran, its relative autonomy from Russian control mechanisms, and its willingness to engage in discreet security cooperation with Israel.

On the other hand, Azerbaijan has close links with Turkey, and the post-2006 worsening of Israel–Turkey relations may have repercussions on Azerbaijan's relations with Israel. As early as the 1990s, Israel helped Azerbaijan set up electronic intelligence-gathering stations. When Iran threatened an Azerbaijani oil tanker in the Caspian Sea in 2001, both Turkey and Israel vowed defense support for Baku. In 2011, Jerusalem began supplying Baku with Orbiter 2M surveillance drones to monitor the Iranian border.

In February 2012, Iran rebuked Azerbaijan for allegedly aiding anti-Iranian activities by Israel's Mossad intelligence agency. A few weeks later Azerbaijan arrested 22 people in a suspected Iranian plot against Israeli and US targets in Azerbaijan. In March 2012, the magazine Foreign Policy reported that the Israeli Air Force may be preparing to use Azerbaijan’s Sitalchay Military Airbase, located 500 km (340 miles) from the Iranian border, for air strikes against the nuclear program of Iran.

On March 29, 2012, officialsstated that Israel was granted access to air bases in Azerbaijan through a "series of quiet political and military understandings." According to Haaretz, these airbases could potentially be used in a strike against Iran over its nuclear program and other tensions with Iran, and would be allowed by Azerbaijan. Israeli and Azerbaijani officials denied these reports.

On September 30, 2012, it was reported that Azerbaijan and Israel jointly examined the use of Azerbaijani air bases and spy drones to help Israeli jets perform a long-range strike on Iran. This would help Israel concerning issues with refueling, reconnaissance, and rescuing crews, and could make an attack more feasible. The plan involves using an Israeli tanker aircraft painted in the colors of a third country airline company that would land and refuel in Azerbaijan and then refuel the Israeli strike aircraft.

According to media reports, Azerbaijan was allegedly the final destination of thousands of top secret documents regarding Iran's nuclear weapons program stolen during a January 2018 covert operation carried out by Mossad agents on a warehouse on the southern outskirts of Tehran.

=== Israeli arms exports to Azerbaijan ===
In 2012, Israel and Azerbaijan signed an agreement according to which state-run Israel Aerospace Industries would sell $1.6 billion in drones and anti-aircraft and missile defense systems to Azerbaijan.

Israel is an important exporter of arms to Azerbaijan. According to research of the Stockholm International Peace Research Institute, Israel accounted for 27 percent of Azerbaijan's major arms imports from 2011 to 2020 and from 2016 to 2020, Israel accounted for 69 percent of Azerbaijan's major arms imports. In 2023, the two countries signed a deal for Israel to supply Azerbaijan with two satellites for $120 million as well as purchase the Barak MX missile interception system for $1.2 billion.

== Trade relations ==
Economic cooperation between Israel and Azerbaijan has grown significantly. As Azerbaijan deregulated its industries and liberalized its economy in the early 1990s, Israeli companies have undertaken foreign direct investment in Azerbaijani markets. Many companies have invested in the service industry. One example is Bezeq, a major Israeli telecommunication provider. Through a trade contract bid in 1994, Bezeq bought a large share of the Azeri telephone operating system. Today it installs phone lines and operates regional services throughout much of the country. Another company, Bakcell, was started as a joint venture between the Ministry of Communication of Azerbaijan and GTIB (Israel) in early 1994 as the first cellular telephone operator in the country. Dozens of Israeli companies are active in the Azerbaijani energy sector. In March 2021, Israeli defense company Meteor Aerospace teamed up with Caspian Ship Building Company (CSBC) of Azerbaijan to jointly offer advanced defense solutions to meet the Eurasian country's national needs.

Between 2000 and 2005, Israel has risen from being Azerbaijan's tenth-largest trading partner to its fifth. According to U.N. statistics, between 1997 and 2004, exports from Azerbaijan to Israel increased from barely over US$2 million to $323 million, fueled in recent years by the high price of oil. As of 2013, 40 percent of Israeli oil is imported from Baku, which makes Azerbaijan Israel's largest oil supplier.

Azerbaijan and Israel abolished double taxation between countries in April 2017. "Defense and energy sectors apart, the bilateral trade between the two countries amounted to $260 million in 2016," said the Israeli ambassador to Azerbaijan. According to the State Customs Committee of Azerbaijan, the total trade turnover between Azerbaijan and Israel amounted to $116.2 million in January–February 2017, which is 17.5 percent more compared to the same period of 2016.

By 2019, over 60% of the gasoline consumed in Israel was supplied by Azerbaijan. Israeli companies have also contributed to the development of Azerbaijan’s oil and gas industries.

In 2020 trade between Azerbaijan and Israel was approximately 200 million US dollars (besides oil supplies).

On July 29, 2021, the Trade and Tourism Representative Office of Azerbaijan was founded in Tel Aviv.

== Energy ==
Azerbaijan and Israel cooperate closely in the field of energy.In a 2007 speech, Israel's ambassador to Azerbaijan, Arthur Lenk, spoke about the steady development of trade between the two countries in the energy sector. He noted that before the Baku–Tbilisi–Ceyhan pipeline became operational in 2006, Israel has been one of the main destinations for Azerbaijani oil exports. According to Lenk, the pipelines' endpoint at Ceyhan, given its close proximity to Israel, opened new opportunities for greater Israeli involvement in regional energy trade. Lenk also said that Israel could play a strategic role in transporting Caspian oil to Asia markets through the Trans-Israel pipeline connecting Ashkelon and Eilat. In addition, he highlighted Israeli efforts in developing alternative energy resources, especially solar energy, and stated that Israel was also exploring the possibility of importing natural gas from the Caspian Sea region.

In December 2016, during his visit to Azerbaijan, Israeli Prime Minister Benjamin Netanyahu noted: "Today we are negotiating not only for the supply of Azerbaijani oil, but also imports of Azerbaijani gas to Israel". In 2021 it was estimated that Israel imported 65 percent of its oil from Azerbaijan.

In January 2026, it was reported that Israel’s imports of crude oil from Azerbaijan had reached their highest level in three years. Ship-tracking figures indicated that Azerbaijan supplied Israel with an average of approximately 94,000 barrels of oil per day, accounting for about 46 percent of Israel’s total crude oil imports. The increase occurred despite Turkey’s formal trade restrictions on Israel, with Azerbaijani crude continuing to reach Israel via the Baku-Tbilisi-Ceyhan pipeline.

== Artificial intelligence ==
Azerbaijan and Israel signed a Memorandum of Understanding on artificial intelligence cooperation, covering supercomputing infrastructure, AI use in critical civilian sectors, human capital development, and joint research. The agreement was signed in Jerusalem by Azerbaijani minister Rashad Nabiyev and Israel’s AI Directorate head Erez Eskel, with Prime Minister Benjamin Netanyahu praising the countries’ longstanding partnership. At the event, Netanyahu said "AI, as you know, is Azerbaijan–Israel. AI is also AI, artificial intelligence, and we’re wedding the two things."

== Resident diplomatic missions ==
- Azerbaijan has an embassy in Tel Aviv.
- Israel has an embassy in Baku.

== See also ==
- Foreign relations of Azerbaijan
- Foreign relations of Israel
- History of the Jews in Azerbaijan
- Khazars
- Khazar hypothesis of Ashkenazi ancestry
- Qırmızı Qəsəbə
- Rafael Harpaz
- International recognition of Israel
- Azerbaijan–Palestine relations
- Israel–Turkey relations
- Azerbaijan–Turkey relations
