= Operational history of the Sukhoi Su-25 =

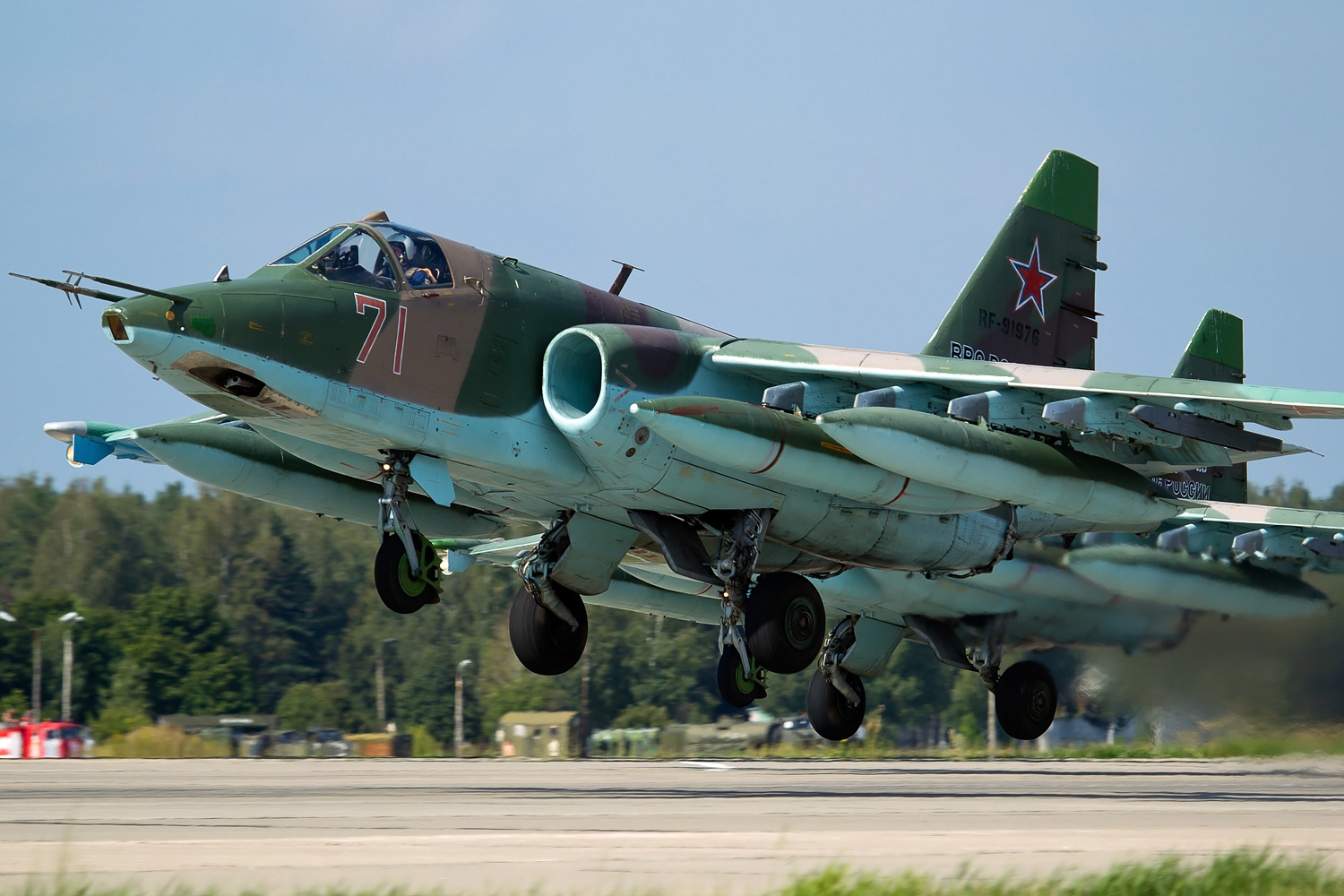
A Russian Air Force Su-25 in 2012.

The Sukhoi Su-25 has seen combat use in numerous conflicts since its operational introduction in 1980. Originally deployed by Soviet forces during the Soviet–Afghan War, the aircraft has since been operated by the air forces of many countries across multiple continents. This article covers the combat history of the Su-25 chronologically, from its first operational use in Afghanistan through conflicts in the Middle East, Africa, the Caucasus, and Eastern Europe. The Su-25 has participated in conflicts including the Soviet–Afghan War, the Iran–Iraq War, the Persian Gulf War, the Chechen Wars, the Russo-Georgian War, the Syrian Civil War, and the War in Donbas, among others. It has been operated by the air forces of Russia, Ukraine, Iraq, Georgia, Angola, Sudan, Chad, Ivory Coast, and several other nations.

== 1980–1989 ==
=== Soviet–Afghan War ===
In total, the Sukhoi Su-25 amassed a total of 60,000 sorties throughout its service in Afghanistan until the Soviet withdrawal in February 1989. The first combat Su-25 unit to be formed was the 200th Independent Attack Squadron (OShAE) based out of Sital-Chai in Soviet Azerbaijan. The first aircraft from the unit arrived in Afghanistan in May 1980 with the full unit deploying in June to Shindand airfield in the western part of the country. The deployment was called Operation Exam and involved a team of engineers and technicians who would oversee the aircraft and evaluate its performance. The first Su-25 combat missions began on 25 July with the 200th OShAE flying counterinsurgency sorties and close air support in support of the 5th Motorized Rifle Division. By 1982, the Su-25's area of responsibility expanded and the aircraft began flying missions sometimes as far as Kabul with pilots flying on average 4–5, sometimes as many as 8, sorties a day. The aircraft typically flew with external fuel tanks to increase its range but was barred from flying in poor weather conditions or nighttime due to faulty navigational equipment. By the time the squadron left Afghanistan in October 1982, its Su-25s had logged more than 2,000 sorties with no losses, however some had sustained damage due to ground fire. The deployment allowed engineers to make several modifications to the aircraft's weapons systems, replacing them with ones more suited for mountain operations and installing increased countermeasures and defensive systems.

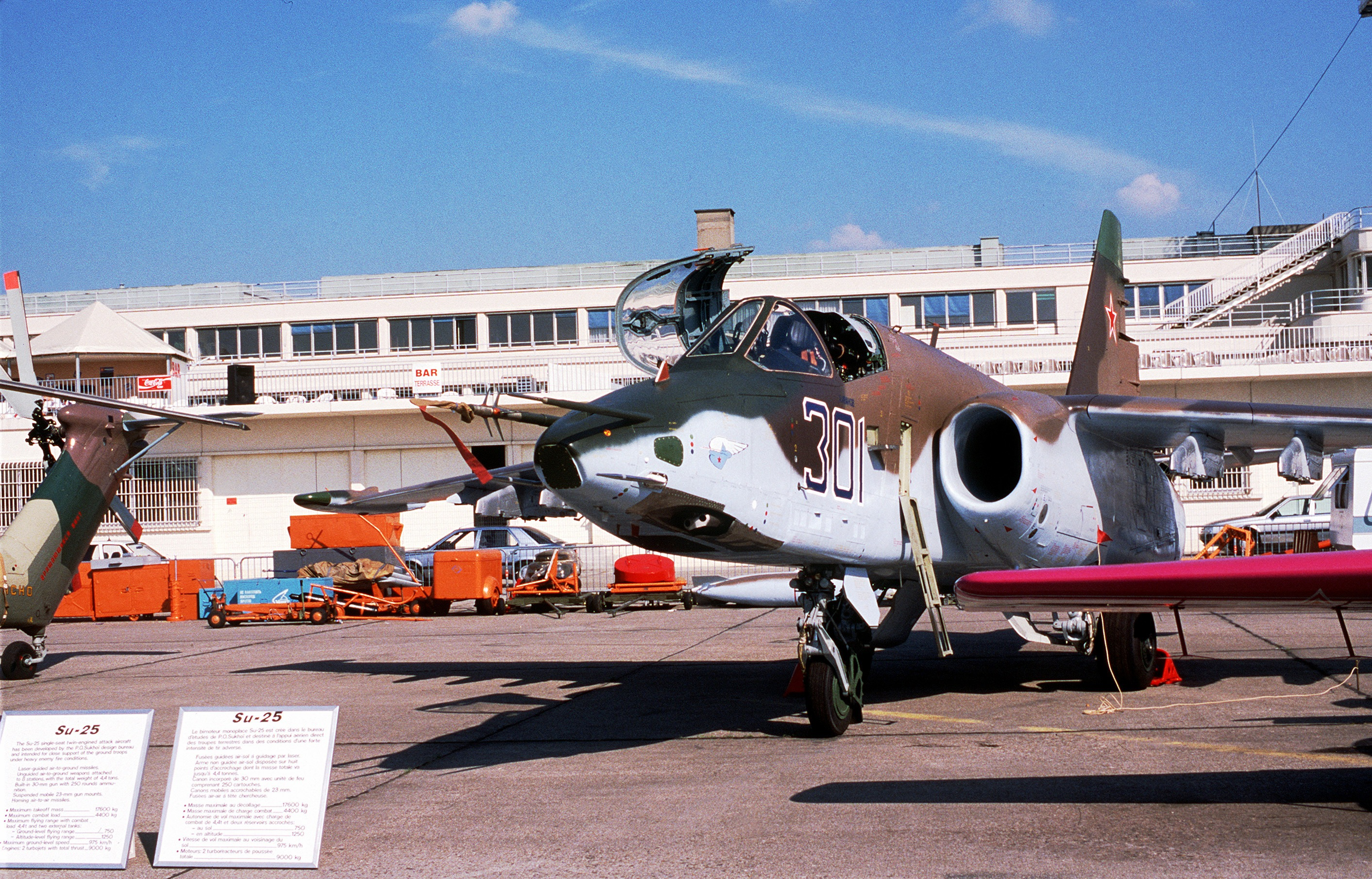
Soviet Su-25 Frogfoot aircraft on display at the 38th Paris International Air and Space Show in 1989.

The introduction of the Su-25 in Afghanistan led to a vastly expanded scope of operations by Soviet ground commanders who could now insert their troops deeper into guerrilla territory with better air cover. The Mujahideen grew to fear and respect the Su-25 as the war grew on, adapting their tactics around the assumption of its use. Su-25s were used as development platforms for Soviet precision guided munitions, being some of the first Soviet aircraft to use such munitions in combat, typically against cave entrances or weapons storage sites. In April 1986, the Su-25 used a precision-guided weapon in combat for the first time, firing a Kh-25 and Kh-29 missile against enemy targets. The introduction of precision bombs and missiles allowed the Su-25 to begin flying missions at higher-altitude, reducing the risk posed by anti-aircraft artillery and shoulder launched surface-to-air missiles.

Because Su-25s were often tasked with flying low-altitude, subsonic, close air support missions in support of ground forces in combat, they made frequent targets for Mujahideen anti-aircraft fire and surface-to-air missiles. Some 23 aircraft were shot down over the course of the war, with an additional dozen or so were lost in non-combat related incidents, while another dozen were written off due to extensive damage, and a further nine were destroyed by bombardments on the ground in Kabul and Kandahar. In all, Su-25s represented a quarter of Soviet Air Force (VVS) fixed-wing losses in the campaign.

On 16 January 1984, a Su-25 piloted by a Soviet lieutenant colonel was struck by a 9K32 Strela-2 missile and downed near Urgun, Afghanistan, making it the first shootdown of a Su-25 in the war.

In August 1988, a Su-25 piloted by Colonel Alexander Rutskoy was hit by anti-aircraft fire and crashed. Rutskoy ejected but landed on Pakistani soil where he was captured and later repatriated to the Soviets. Some sources state he was shot down by Pakistani warplanes. The aircraft's wreckage was reportedly salvaged by Pakistan and handed over to the United States. In October of that year, a Su-25 sustained a powerful hit at high-altitude north of Gardez, heavily damaging it but remaining flyable. The strike was reportedly the result of a missile fired by a Pakistani fighter jet.

In January 1989, a missile hit a Su-25 near Kabul killing the pilot in the last combat loss of the aircraft in Afghanistan.

=== Iran–Iraq War ===
The Iraqi Air Force was the first non-Eastern Bloc country to receive the Su-25, with Iraq receiving 69 'K' single-seat variants and four 'UBK' two-seater variants between 1986 and 1987, enough to equip two ground-attack regiments. The Su-25 saw extensive use in the latter stages of the Iran–Iraq War, its first action outside of Afghanistan, in combat against Iranian forces. One Su-25K purportedly survived a direct hit from an Iranian MIM-23 Hawk surface-to-air missile battery, managing to return to base and land. In total, the Su-25 took part in 900 combat sorties in the conflict and many of their pilots were personally decorated by Saddam Hussein. Two Su-25Ks were lost in combat in the war, of which one was lost to Iranian air defenses.

== 1990–1999 ==
=== Persian Gulf War ===
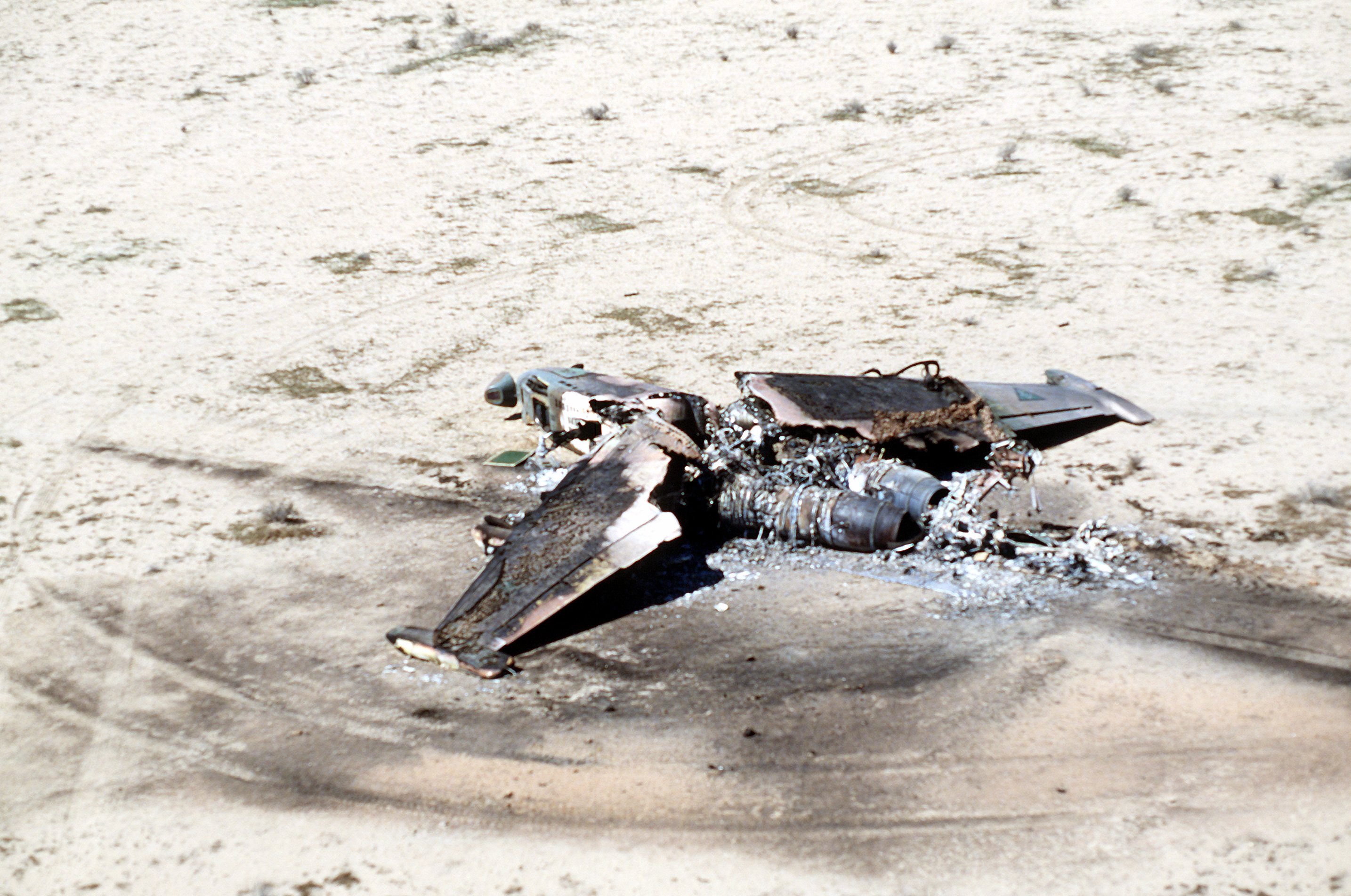
A Su-25 Frogfoot aircraft destroyed during Operation Desert Storm

The Iraqi Air Force's Su-25 aircraft played little part in the Persian Gulf War as did most Iraqi aircraft. At least one Su-25 squadron saw action during the August 1990 Invasion of Kuwait. During the war, seven of the IAF's Su-25 aircraft were flown to neighboring Iran to shield them from air strikes. Two Su-25 jets were shot down by U.S. F-15C interceptors on 6 February 1991 using AIM-9 Sidewinder air-to-air missiles. However, most of Iraq's Su-25 fleet was destroyed on the ground in precision strikes on hardened aircraft shelters during the war and they were not used for ground attack against coalition forces.

=== Angolan Civil War ===
Angola received its first batch of Su-25 jets from the Soviet Union in 1988. During the Angolan Civil War, the Angolan Air Force used the Su-25 against UNITA forces advancing on Luanda but to little tactical effect as they often flew bombing missions from high altitudes, reducing the aircraft's effectiveness, an issue exacerbated by a withdrawal of Soviet support in 1991 which caused serviceability issues. The Su-25 was also flown by mercenaries from the South African private military company Executive Outcomes based out of Saurimo Airport against UNITA forces beginning in the early 1990s.

=== War in Abkhazia ===
During the War in Abkhazia, the Su-25 was used by the Georgian Air Force, the Abkhazian Air Force, and the Russian Air Force in a series of combat actions in the breakaway province. The Georgian Air Force flew as many as 215 combat missions in the Su-25 during the war. Russian Su-25s flying on the side of Abkhazian separatists performed numerous raids on Georgian positions near the besieged port city of Sukhumi, flying out of an airfield in Gudauta. On at least one occasion, a Russian Su-25 bombed a residential district of Sukhumi, killing a civilian and destroying numerous homes and other buildings. During the conflict, the Russian government asserted that Su-25s bombing Georgian positions were not Russian but, in fact, Georgian warplanes with painted Russian insignia, a claim that drew much doubt since many of these Su-25 aircraft were flying uninhibited through Russian airspace. On 6 January 1993, a Georgian Su-25 crashed in Abkhazia province with the pilot ejecting to safety. On 19 March 1993, a Russian Air Force Su-25 piloted by Major Vazlav Shipko was shot down by Georgian air defenses near Sukhumi, however some sources state he was flying a Su-27. On 4 July 1993, a Georgian Su-25 was struck by an Abkhazian surface-to-air missile, forcing the aircraft into the sea off Sukhumi and killing the pilot.

=== Eritrean–Ethiopian War ===
The Ethiopian Air Force operated the Su-25 during the Eritrean–Ethiopian War, after receiving a delivery of a pair of Su-25Ts and two Su-25UBKs from the Russian Air Force in March 2000. Combat operations were flown from Mek'ele and Debre Zeyit. On 15 May 2000, a Su-25 piloted by Flight Lieutenant Wondu Ghenda was shot down by an Eritrean Air Force MiG-29, killing the pilot.

=== First Nagorno-Karabak War ===
During the First Nagorno-Karabakh War, both Armenia and Azerbaijan used Su-25 aircraft inherited from the Soviet Union. However, Armenia's use of its modest five jets during the war was minimal while the Azeri Air Force utilized it heavily in strafing and bombing missions against Armenian targets. At least three Su-25s operated by Azerbaijan were downed during the conflict. One was shot down in 1992 by a missile while conducting a ground attack mission over Armenian territory. In 1994, two were lost in separate incidents. One in February where the aircraft was struck by ground fire causing the pilot to eject and become captured. Another Su-25 was lost the following April with the pilot managing to eject. Human Rights Watch alleges in a 1994 report that Azerbaijan used its Su-25 aircraft in an indiscriminate manner against civilian population centers in Nagorno-Karabakh and Armenia.

=== Chechen War ===
Su-25s saw heavy use by the Russian Air Force again during the First and Second Chechen War. During the First Chechen War, some 140 Su-25s flew 5,300 strike sorties, notably playing an instrumental role in the destruction and the capture of the heavily defended Grozny Presidential Palace, dropping BETAB-500 anti-concrete bombs on it. However, Russian Su-25s rarely operated at night or in poor weather due to faulty equipment and insufficient training, and aircraft rarely used precision munitions, utilizing unguided bombs and rockets for the most part instead. This lack of precision munitions and poor training led to several friendly fire incidents where Russian aircraft hit buildings occupied by Russian troops. However, Russian air losses during the campaign were low due to a lack of capable air defenses. Four Su-25s were lost in combat.

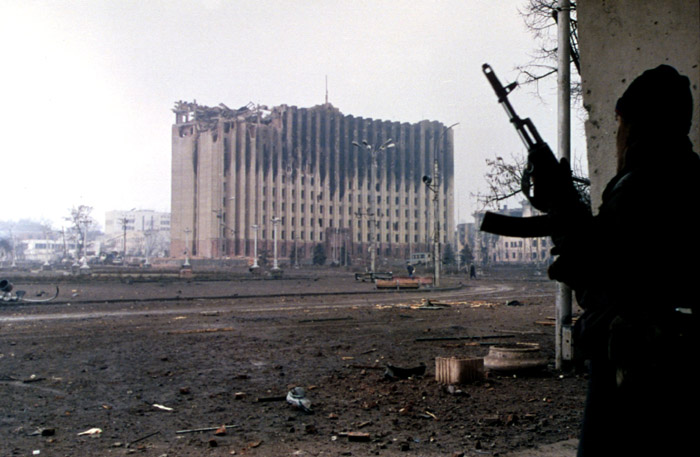
Presidential palace in Grozny in 1995.

- On 4 February 1995, a Su-25 piloted by Major Nikolay Bairov crashed 5 kilometres (3 mi) southeast of Grozny after being hit by ZSU-23-4 anti-aircraft fire. The pilot was able to eject but was still killed after his parachute failed to fully deploy. Another Su-25 piloted by Lieutenant Colonel Evgeny Derkulsky was damaged but was able to return to base.
- On 5 May 1995, a Su-25 piloted by Colonel Vladimir Sarabeyev from the 4th Air Army was hit by 12.7mm DShK fire while flying a low altitude patrol near the village of Serzhen-Yurt. The bullets pierced the unarmored side canopy glass of the cockpit, killing the pilot and causing the plane to crash. Chechen rebels managed to recover maps and charts from the wreckage.
- On 4 April 1996, a Su-25 piloted by Major Alexander Matvienko flying a reconnaissance mission near Goiskoye was shot down with a Stinger missile forcing the pilot to eject. The pilot was successfully rescued by helicopter.
- On 5 May 1996, a Su-25UB crewed by Colonel Igor Sviryidov and Major Oleg Isayev was shot down by a 9K34 Strela-3 shoulder-launched surface to air missile while flying near Serzhen-Yurt, killing both pilots.

During the initial push into Chechnya, Russian Su-25 and Su-24 strike aircraft destroyed the majority of the dilapidated Chechen air fleet on the ground in a matter of hours. In 1995, facilitated by clear weather, air cover provided by Su-25s allowed Russian troops to push across the Argun River and into the towns of Gudermes and Shali, setting the stage for a decisive victory over separatist forces in the region.

Chechen separatist leader Dzhokhar Dudayev was killed on 21 April 1996, after a Su-25 fired two laser-guided missiles at his position, after an A-50 aircraft pinpointed his satellite phone signal and relayed the location to the Su-25. A picture purportedly from the warhead as it approached Dudayev later surfaced in Argumenty i Fakty, a Russian newspaper.

In 1999, Russian Su-25s once again saw heavy use in Chechnya with the onset of the Second Chechen War in 1999. During the war, the Su-25 was again primarily a close air support platform, providing support for ground troops at low altitude in conjunction with Mi-24 Hind and Ka-50 helicopters while Su-24s flew higher altitude precision strikes. Su-25s would often fly at altitudes between 16,000 and 20,000 feet before visually acquiring and attacking their targets at lower altitudes, typically utilizing unguided rockets and bombs. For more accurate strikes, Su-25s used Kh-25ML and Kh-29 laser-guided missiles. In a newer tactic not utilized during the First Chechen War, Su-25s engaged in "free hunt" operations, flying ahead of larger Russian formations in visual search of targets of opportunity. On occasion, these flights would be accompanied by reconnaissance Su-24s to increase the probability of locating mobile targets.

A new all-weather with night capability variant, the Su-25T, was introduced into combat during this conflict with notable successes with six of the aircraft flying a total of 20 sorties throughout the fighting. The 'T' model had improved sighting and was modified to include the new B-13 rocket pod.

Six Su-25 aircraft were lost during the Second Chechen War.

- On 3 October 1999, a Su-25 flying a reconnaissance mission over the village of Tolstoy-Yurt was hit by a missile and shot down, killing the pilot.
- On 9 September 1999, a Su-25 from the 960th Air Assault Regiment was struck in the fuel line by ground fire, possibly by a shoulder-launched surface-to-air missile causing the pilot to eject and crash.
- On 13 December 1999, the rocket pod of a Su-25 piloted by Colonel Sergey Borisyuk malfunction resulting in a fire that caused the pilot to eject. Col. Borisyuk was rescued on the ground.
- On 22 January 2000, a Su-25 was hit by a MANPAD, resulting in the loss of the left-engine. The pilot was able to land the aircraft safely however the aircraft was written off.
- On 14 June 2001, a pair of Su-25s piloted by Lieutenant Colonel Yuriy Yakimenko and Captain Oleg Podsitkov crashed into mountainous terrain, killing both pilots.
- On 29 April 2002, a Su-25 piloted by Major Igor Bezryadin crashed after entering an unrecoverable nosedive.

== 2000–2009 ==
=== Macedonian insurgency ===
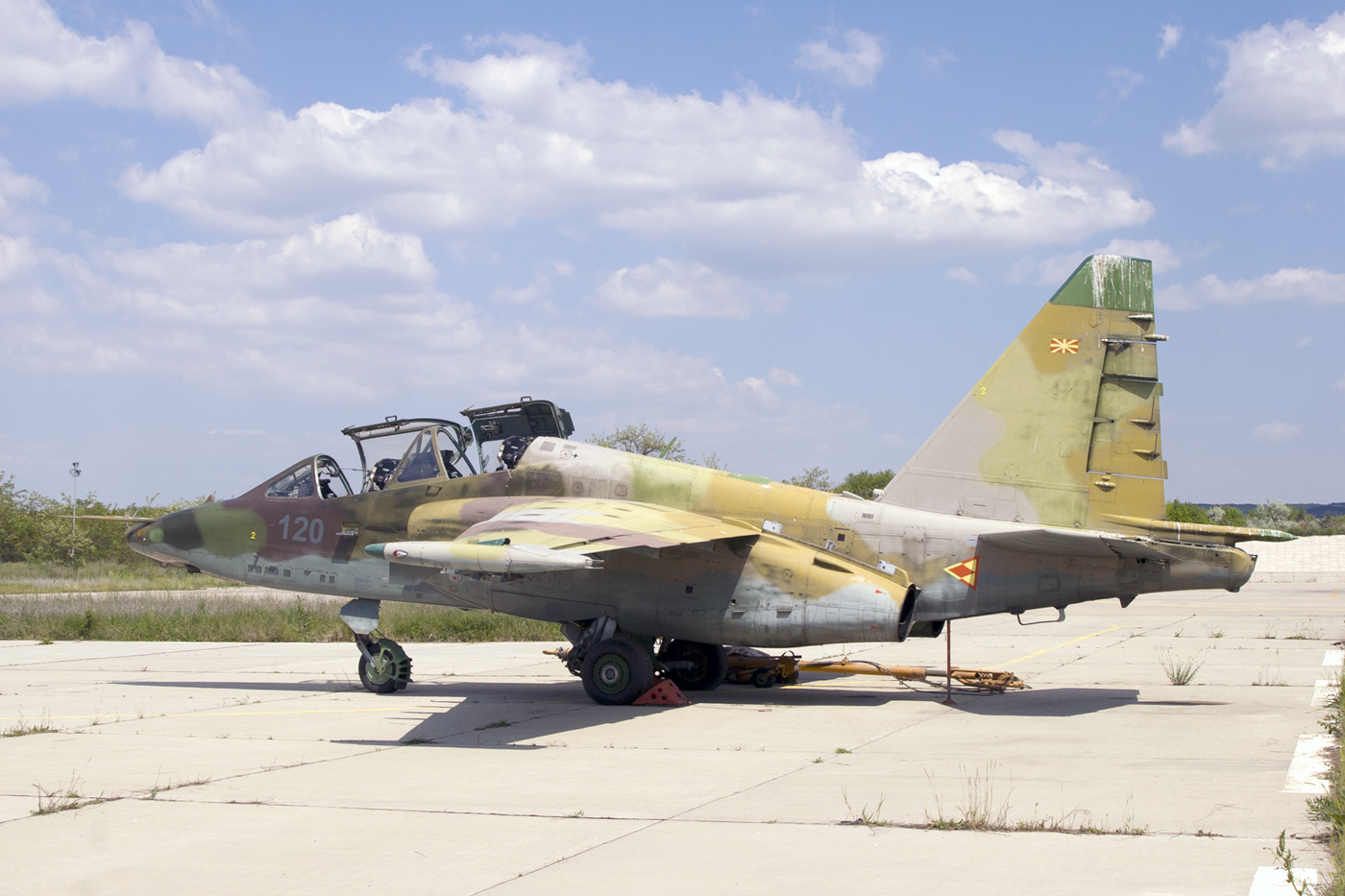
Su-25UB that was used by the Macedonian Air Force

In June 2001, the government of Macedonia procured four Su-25 aircraft (three single seat, one two-seater) from Ukraine which promptly entered service in the Macedonian Air Force. In the first aerial combat action of the Macedonian military, they were used to combat ethnic Albanian insurgents in Macedonia. Mostly flown from an air force base near Petrovec, these aircraft were piloted by Ukrainian mercenaries as Macedonia did not have any pilots trained in flying the aircraft. They saw heavy use in ground attack missions against insurgents. During the Battle of Raduša in August 2001, the Su-25s supported beleaguered security forces in the town alongside Mi-24 helicopters.

=== Ivorian Civil War ===
Four Su-25 aircraft (two one seaters, and two two-seaters) were procured from Belarus by the Ivory Coast in 2004. After the outbreak of the First Ivorian Civil War, the government of Laurent Gbagbo used his air force to bomb rebel forces. On 6 November 2004, a pair of Su-25 aircraft based out of Abidjan and piloted by mixed crews of Ivorians and Belarusians bombed a French encampment near the city of Bouaké, killing nine French Licorne peacekeepers and an American aid worker, and destroying several vehicles. The attack triggered the French to destroy the Ivorian air force, firing MILAN missiles at the two Su-25s that had attacked the French troops shortly after they landed, damaging them, and seizing the other two and disabling them.

=== Sudan and Chad ===
The Sudanese Air Force has obtained fifteen Su-25 aircraft from Belarus since 2008. Despite Sudanese government assurances that the aircraft would not be used in the Darfur conflict, United Nations inspectors discovered four Su-25 bombers at El Fasher Airport in the region and numerous reports have surfaced of the aircraft taking part in indiscriminate targeting of villages.

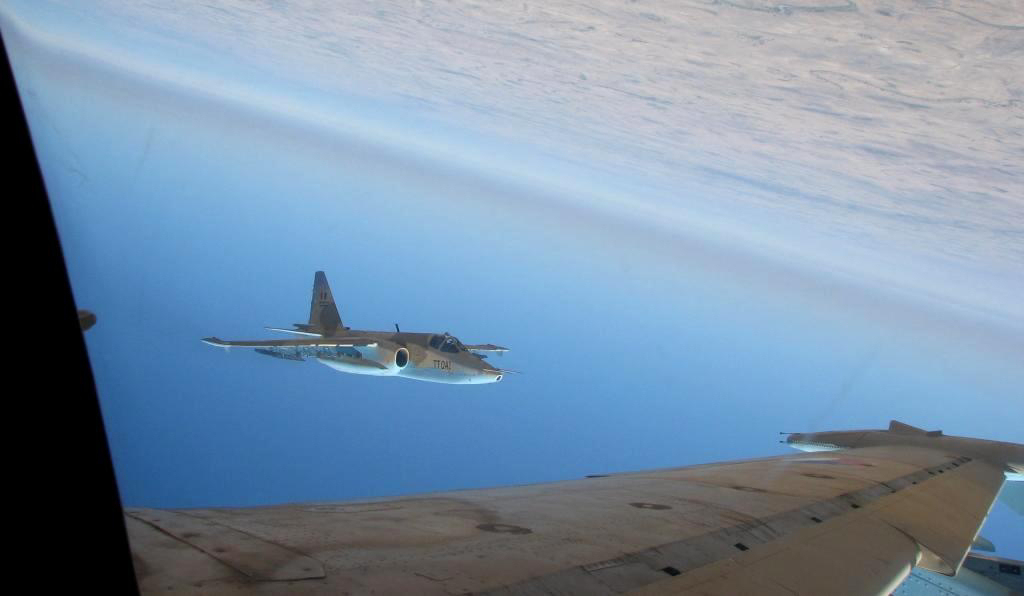
Chad Air Force Sukhoi Su-25 inflight

Chad obtained six Su-25 jets from Ukraine to enhance its close air support capability. In May 2009, the Su-25s operated by the Chadian Air Force bombed rebel columns in southeastern Chad, near Abéché.

=== Russo-Georgia War ===
The Su-25 was once again pressed into service in the skies of Georgia during the Russo-Georgian War in 2008, seeing extensive use by both the Russian and Georgian air forces. At the beginning of the war, Georgia had a fleet of twelve Su-25 aircraft (two of them trainers) at its disposal. The aircraft saw particularly heavy use in fighting around Tskhinvali, the South Ossetian capital. Out of six Russian aircraft lost in the war, three were Su-25s. All were most likely lost to friendly fire.

The first Russian air loss of the campaign was a Su-25 piloted by Lieutenant Colonel Oleg Terebunsky of the 368th Attack Aviation Regiment, shot down over the territory of South Ossetia near the Zarsk pass, between Dzhava and Tskhinvali. He was hit by a MANPADS missile fired by South Ossetian militia around 6.00 p.m. on 8 August, in a case of friendly fire. Earlier in the day, a flight of four Georgian Su-25 planes had attacked a Russian army convoy in the same area. This was one of the few missions conducted by Georgia's Su-25s during the brief conflict as Tbilisi reasoned that its aircraft would soon become easy targets for Russian interceptors. The aircraft returned to their bases and were hidden under camouflage netting to prevent them from being located.

At 10:30 a.m. on 9 August, a Su-25 piloted by Colonel Sergey Kobylash, commander of the 368th Attack Aviation Regiment, was shot down during an attack on a Georgian military formation south of Tskhinvali, on the Gori-Tskhinvali road. After making his initial approach, Kolybash's aircraft was struck by a missile that impacted his left engine, rendering it inoperable. Not long after, as Kobylash was returning to base at an altitude of 1,000 meters, a MANPADS missile struck his right engine, leaving the plane without thrust. Kobylash ejected north of Tskhinvali in a South Ossetian village of the Georgian enclave of in the Great Liakh gorge, where he was recovered by a Russian combat search and rescue team. Shortly after Kobylash was rescued, South Ossetian militants made the claim they had downed a Georgian Su-25 however this possibility was rejected as Georgia's air force had ceased air operations the day before, more than likely making the shootdown of the Su-25 another incident of friendly fire.

At 1:00 p.m. on 9 August, another Su-25 from the 368th Attack Aviation Regiment, piloted by Major Vladimir Edamenko, was struck by fire from a Russian ZSU-23-4 Shilka anti-aircraft gun near Dzhava killing the pilot. Two hours later, a Su-25 mistakenly attacked a Russian military convoy near Liakhva, destroying a fuel tanker and injuring several troops. The Russian soldiers returned fire with a MANPADS damaging the Su-25.

Russian Su-25s also hit numerous targets deep inside Georgian territory including the Marneuli air base, however none of Georgia's Su-25 aircraft were lost. In Tskhinvali, Russian Su-25s attacked Georgian infantrymen as they rested in the outskirts of the city. The strikes killed 20 Georgian troops and injured countless more, causing the entire battalion to abandon their equipment and flee sparking rumors about the battalion's annihilation which played a hand in the Georgian withdrawal from the city. The Tbilisi Aircraft Manufacturing, a factory that produces Su-25s, was also bombed damaging a runway but otherwise causing no casualties.

== 2010–2019 ==
=== Syrian Civil War ===
In September 2015, the U.S. Department of Defense released satellite photos of an airfield in Latakia, a Syrian government-controlled city, showing twelve Su-25 planes on the tarmac. Airstrikes by Russian forces in support of the Assad government began later that same month. The aircraft have been used predominantly to strike opposition vehicles, fighting positions, artillery pieces, and other non-strategic targets in the country.

In January 2015, Syrian Air Force MiG-29s and Russian Su-25s took part in a joint-strike mission against militant targets in what was the first time Syrian and Russian warplanes flew a combat mission together.

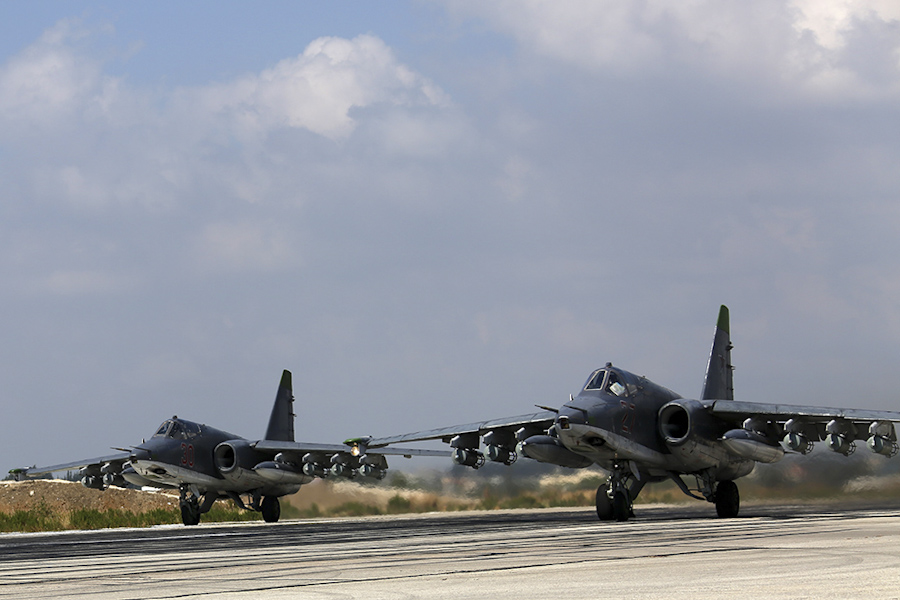
A pair of Sukhoi Su-25s take off at Latakia

In 2016, Alexander Galkin, the Russia's Southern Military District commander, said Su-25s had flown more than 1,600 sorties and dropped around 6,000 bombs since the beginning of Russia's intervention in September 2015. In September 2017, the Russian Ministry of Defence released a video showing two Su-25s helping to rescue Russian troops encircled by Tahrir al-Sham militants. Two months later, a pair of Su-25s flying near Mayadin, in eastern Syria, was suddenly intercepted by a U.S. F-22 jet which abruptly entered the flight path of the two Russian warplanes and deployed flares and chaff in an attempt to cause the Su-25s to change their heading. The United States claimed the incident was not a provocation but a response to the Russian jets crossing the Euphrates River deconfliction line and not responding to radio calls.

On 3 February 2018, a Russian Su-25 piloted by Major Roman Filipov flying over Idlib Governorate was hit by a surface-to-air missile, downing the aircraft and forcing the pilot to eject. Filipov committed suicide to avoid capture on the ground.

=== Russo-Ukrainian War (2014-ongoing) ===
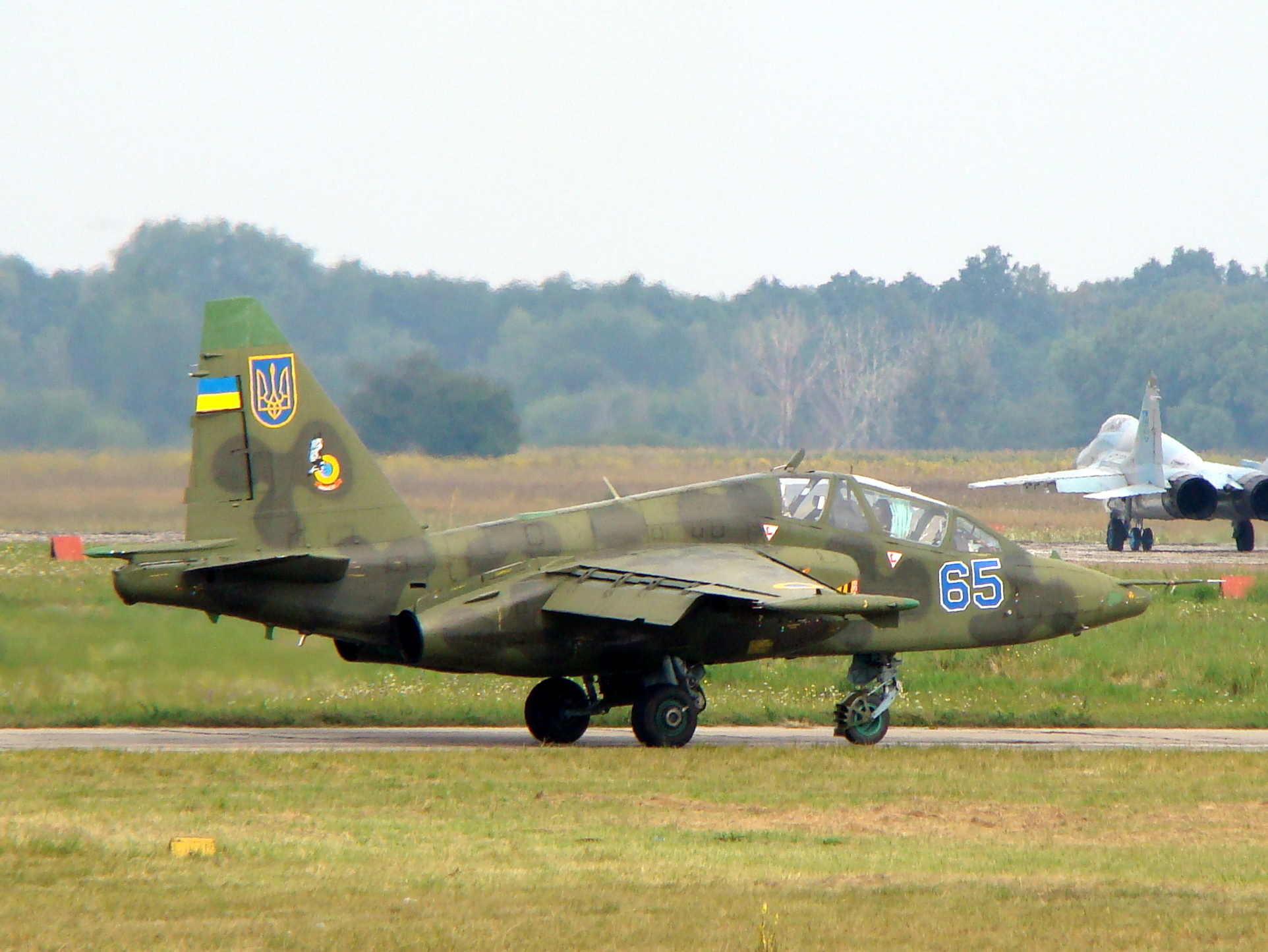
Su-25UB of the Ukrainian Air Force

The Ukrainian Air Force has made use of its fleet of Su-25 warplanes in the War in Donbass, using them for strike missions against pro-Russian separatists, and at times Russian government forces. During the First Battle of Donetsk Airport, Su-25s were witnessed partaking in ground attack missions, at times firing unguided rockets at separatist positions. During fighting at Kramatorsk Airport, Su-25s were used to deliver supplies to besieged Ukrainian troops, flying at a low altitude and parachuting provisions. A rocket and strafing attack on a regional administration building in Luhansk was purportedly carried out by a Ukrainian Su-25 aircraft. During the Battle of Debaltseve in 2015, Russian Air Force Su-25s participated in the route of Ukrainian troops and the subsequent capture of the city. After the shootdown of Malaysia Airlines Flight 17 in 2014, the Russian military cited the appearance of a Ukrainian Su-25 on its radar in the vicinity of the airliner as evidence that the Ukrainian military were the culprits behind the shootdown.

Four Ukrainian Su-25 aircraft have been lost in combat during the conflict. On 16 July 2014, a Ukrainian Su-25 was struck by a missile and downed over eastern Ukraine. The pilot was able to eject and survived. The Ukrainian government placed the blame for the shootdown on a Russian Su-27 fighter jet.

On 23 July 2014, a pair of Su-25 jets flying near separatist-held Savur-Mohyla were shot down while flying at an altitude of 17,000 feet (5,200 meters). Both pilots were able to eject. The Ukrainian military said the aircraft had been downed by a long-range missile system, possibly fired from Russia.

On 29 August 2014, a Su-25 flying near Luhansk was shot down by a surface-to-air missile. The pilot ejected and was recovered by Ukrainian troops.

=== Iraqi Civil War (2014–2017) ===
In late June 2014, twelve Su-25 planes arrived in Iraq aboard cargo planes after being purchased second-hand from Russia, entering combat service shortly later in the war against the Islamic State, despite having few munitions in its stockpile compatible with the type. The delivery was accompanied by technicians in order to train the Iraqis in the plane's operation and maintenance. The purchase was made after several delays complicated Baghdad's purchase of U.S. F-16 fighters. Seven more Su-25s from Iran arrived in Iraq before the end of June as well. These aircraft were formerly Iraqi Air Force jets that had fled to Iran during the 1990–1991 Gulf War. Experts noted that some of the aircraft has visible signs of wear and corrosion. In 2015, Iraqi pilots received training in Belarus on flying the Su-25. By 2016, Iraq had 21 Su-25s in its possession.

Iraqi Air Force Su-25s were used for close air support during the Battle of Ramadi and other battles in western Al Anbar Governorate. On 12 August 2014, a Su-25 piloted by Iraqi Colonel Jalil Al Awadi crashed after takeoff at Muthenna Air Base, severely damaging the plane and killing the pilot. Another Su-25 was withdrawn from service after suffering damage when it was hit by a surface-to-air missile during a mission over Kirkuk.

== See also ==
- List of aircraft losses during the Russo-Ukrainian War
- List of Soviet aircraft losses during the Soviet–Afghan War
- 2004 French–Ivorian clashes
- Russian intervention in the Syrian civil war
