= Rail Rzayev =

Commander of Azerbaijani Air and Air Defense Forces
- In office 1993 – February 11, 2009
- President: Heydar Aliyev; Ilham Aliyev
- Preceded by: office established
- Succeeded by: Altay Mehdiyev

Personal details
- Born: March 10, 1945 Salyan, Azerbaijan SSR, USSR
- Died: February 11, 2009 (aged 63) Baku, Azerbaijan

Military service
- Branch/service: Azerbaijani Air Force
- Years of service: 1966–2009
- Rank: Lieutenant General

Lieutenant General Rail Rzayev (Azerbaijani: Rail Qurban oğlu Rzayev; March 10, 1945 – February 11, 2009) was the Commander of the Azerbaijani Air Force from shortly after Azerbaijan's independence in the early 1990s, to his death in 2009.

== Early life ==
Rzayev was born on March 10, 1945, in Salyan, Azerbaijan. After completing his secondary education in Sumgayit in 1962, he was enrolled in the Aircraft Electronics and Communication Systems (FRELA) school of the Soviet Aviation Academy named after Orzhenikidze. After graduating from the academy in 1966, he was directed to serve at Baku Air Defense District. In Baku, he worked as the Senior Technician and then served as the Deputy Commander of a Division. In 1975, he entered the Zhukov Air and Space Defence Academy. Upon graduation he was appointed a Division Commander and from 1980 through 1992, he held several high-ranking positions at various military units of the Soviet Air Force.

== Azerbaijani Air Force ==
In 1992, Rzayev started his career in Azerbaijani Armed Forces. He was appointed the Chief of Department of Azerbaijani Air and Air Defense Forces. According to the Presidential Decree from 1993, he was appointed Deputy Minister of Defense of Azerbaijan Republic and Commander of Azerbaijani Air and Air Defense Forces, a position which he held until his death in 2009.

== Assassination ==
Lieutenant General Rzayev was shot and killed outside his Baku home on February 11, 2009. He was reportedly shot in the head at approximately 8 a.m. when a single shot was fired at the entrance to his home. He later died of his wounds in hospital. He was the most senior official to have been killed in the former Soviet Azerbaijan since the 1990s.

== Ranks and awards ==
In 1994, Rzayev was promoted to General Major, in 2002 he was given the rank of Lieutenant General. He's credited for his outstanding work in establishing and modernizing the Azerbaijani Air Force. He was awarded with Azerbaijani Flag Order and Veten Ughrunda Medal (In the Name of Motherland) for service to his country.
