= Altay Mehdiyev =

Commander of Azerbaijani Air Forces
- In office 12 May 2009 – 18 November 2013
- President: Ilham Aliyev
- Preceded by: Rail Rzayev
- Succeeded by: Ramiz Tahirov

Military service
- Branch/service: Azerbaijani Air Force
- Rank: Major General

Major General Altay Ramazan oglu Mehdiyev (Azerbaijani: Altay Ramazan oğlu Mehdiyev) was the Commander of Azerbaijani Air Forces.

== Career ==
General Mehdiev originates from the city of Lankaran.

=== Air force commander ===
After the assassination of the Commander of Azerbaijani Air Force, Lieutenant General Rail Rzayev on 11 February 2009 the position remained unfilled until 12 May 2009, when President Ilham Aliyev appointed Mehdiyev to take over the command. Before the appointment, Mehdiyev served as the Chief of Staff of Azerbaijani Armed Forces in Nakhchivan. He's considered to be a professional, well trained for air force operations.

Mehdiyev was awarded with Veten Ughrunda Medal (In the Name of Motherland) for service to his country on 22 June 2006.

=== Dismissal ===
He was dismissed on 18 November 2013. He was appointed to the post of rector of the War College of the Azerbaijani Armed Forces.
