= Sitalchay Military Airbase =

Military airbase in Azerbaijan

- IATA: none; ICAO: none

Summary
- Airport type: Military
- Owner: Azerbaijan Air Force
- Operator: None
- Location: Sitalchay
- Coordinates: 40°47′02″N 049°24′02″E

Map
- Location of airport in Azerbaijan

Sitalchay (Azerbaijani: Sitalçay) Military Airbase is a military airbase located in the East of Azerbaijan, near the Caspian Sea. It is located 70 km North-West of the capital Baku in Sitalchay, a village and municipality in the Khizi Rayon. The airbase is fenced and guarded but has not been operational since 1992.

== History ==
The Sitalchay air base was the location of the first Soviet Air Forces Sukhoi Su-25 unit. The first eleven production aircraft were assigned to the 80th or 60th Separate Assault Aviation Regiment, based at Sitalchay, in April 1981.

In June 1981, the 200th Separate Assault Aviation Squadron was formed at Sitalchay and then deployed to Afghanistan. In the late 1980s and early 1990s it became a base for a regiment of Su-25s of the 34th Air Army of the Soviet Air Forces.

In August 1992, despite the provisions of the Tashkent Treaty which directed an orderly transfer of ex-Soviet forces to the republics, Azeri troops seized the entire regiment and its aircraft.

== Possible use by Israel ==
In March 2012, the magazine Foreign Policy reported that the Israeli Air Force might be preparing to use the airbase, located 500 km from the Iranian border, for air strikes against the nuclear program of Iran. Since then some analysts as well as news agencies started presenting the issue as something confirmed. Although confirming that Israel is seeking such access, political circles in Azerbaijan deny such consent from Baku. Moreover, high-ranking politicians deny any possibility of using Azeri territory for any strike against Iran; a development that Iran sees as possible.
