= Samir Safarov =

Azerbaijani military officer

- Native name: Samir Eldar oğlu Səfərov
- Born: Samir Eldar oglu Safarov; January 2, 1979 (age 47); Yeni Daşkənd, Barda District, Azerbaijani SSR, Soviet Union
- Allegiance: Azerbaijani Armed Forces
- Branch: Azerbaijani Land Forces
- Service years: 2000–
- Rank: Lieutenant colonel
- Conflicts: Four-Day War; Second Nagorno-Karabakh War; Aras Valley campaign; Lachin offensive; Battle of Shusha
- Awards: "For Faultless Service" medal; "90th Anniversary of the Armed Forces of Azerbaijan (1918–2008)" Medal; "95th Anniversary of the Armed Forces of Azerbaijan (1918–2013)" Medal; For the Liberation of Jabrayil Medal; For the Liberation of Gubadly Medal; For the Liberation of Lachin Medal
- Alma mater: Azerbaijan Higher Naval Academy

Samir Eldar oglu Safarov (Azerbaijani: Samir Eldar oğlu Səfərov; 2 January 1979) is an Azerbaijani military officer, lieutenant colonel serving in the Azerbaijani Armed Forces. He fought in the 2016 Nagorno-Karabakh clashes and 2020 Nagorno-Karabakh war.

== Early life ==
Samir Eldar oglu Safarov was born on 2 January 1979, in Yeni Daşkənd, Barda District of the Azerbaijani SSR, then Soviet Union. He entered Yeni Daşkənd secondary school in 1985, and graduated from it in 1995. Safarov was admitted to the Baku Higher Naval Academy in 1996. He graduated from it on 24 June 2000, with a degree in socio-political psychology. When Safarov graduated from the academy, he was also awarded with the rank of lieutenant.

== Military service ==
Samir Safarov was sent to military unit N situated in Gadabay to continue his service by the order of the Azerbaijani Minister of Defense. He began working as an instructor in the educational department of the same military unit. In 2001, Safarov served as a motorized infantry platoon commander in military unit N situated in Lankaran, and from 2002 to 2003 as an instructor in the same military unit. From 2003 to 2006, he was the deputy commander of the motorized rifle battalion in the military unit N situated in Fuzuli for educational work. Safarov began his service in Ganja in 2006. Until 2007 he served in the military unit N situated in Ganja as a deputy commander of the motorized infantry battalion for educational work, and until 2011 as a deputy head of the personnel department. From 2011, he served as the deputy chief of personnel unit of the military unit N situated in Goranboy, and as the deputy chief of staff unit of the same military unit from 2014. From 2015 to 2017, Safarov served as deputy commander of personnel unit N situated in Tartar.

During the 2016 Nagorno-Karabakh clashes, he was a deputy commander of the military unit N situated in Tartar. During the clashes, he fought alongside Polad Hashimov, took part in the clashes near the Ohanyan defense line and the capture of the heights around Talış. From 2017 to 2018, he served as deputy commander of personnel unit N situated in Aghjabadi. Safarov was released from active military service by the order of the Azerbaijani minister of defense in 2018. Safarov, despite being discharged from the armed forces in 2018, voluntarily appealed to the military commissariat on 27 September to serve on the frontline during the 2020 Nagorno-Karabakh war. In early October 2020, he began to serve as an officer, and took part in the Aras Valley campaign and Lachin offensive. He was then transferred to Shusha, and fought during the three-day battle over the city's control.
