= Kurdamir Air Base =

- IATA: UB14; ICAO: UB14

Summary
- Airport type: Military
- Owner/Operator: Republic of Azerbaijan
- Location: Kürdəmir
- Occupants: Azerbaijani Air Defense Force
- Time zone: AZT (+4:00)
  - Summer (DST): AZT (+5:00)
- Elevation AMSL: −35 ft / −11 m
- Coordinates: 40°16′24″N 48°09′48″E

Map

Runways
Direction	Length		Surface
Direction	ft	m	Surface
08/26	8,200	2,499	Concrete

Kurdamir Air Base is a military airbase in Kurdamir (also known as Kyurdamir or Kürdəmir), the capital of the Kurdamir District (rayon) in Azerbaijan.

At the end of the 1980s the 976 Bomber Aviation Regiment Инстербургский flying Sukhoi Su-24 and Sukhoi Su-17 aircraft was based at Kurdamir. The regiment, which was descended from the 976th Fighter Aviation Regiment of the World War II period, was part of the 34th Air Army of the Soviet Air Forces.

== See also ==
- List of airports in Azerbaijan
