= Azerbaijani Air Forces =

Air warfare and air defense branch of Azerbaijan's armed forces

- Azərbaycan Hərbi Hava Qüvvələri
- Emblem of the Azerbaijani Air Forces
- Founded: 1919; 107 years ago (Establishment); 1992; 34 years ago (Re-establishment)
- Country: Azerbaijan Democratic Republic (1918–1920); Republic of Azerbaijan (1991–present)
- Type: Air force
- Role: Aerial defense; Aerial warfare
- Size: 15,000 personnel; Approx 182 aircraft (2025)
- Part of: Azerbaijani Armed Forces
- Headquarters: Nasosnaya Air Base
- Anniversaries: 14 February (Air Force Day)
- Engagements: First Nagorno-Karabakh War; Second Nagorno-Karabakh War

Commanders
- Commander of the Air Force: Lieutenant General Namig Islamzadeh

Insignia
- Roundel

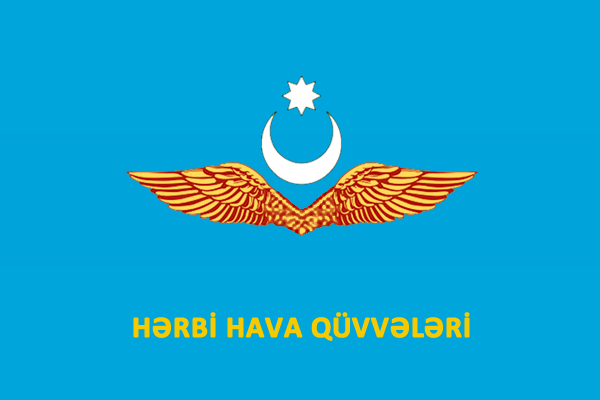
- Flag

Aircraft flown
- Attack: Su-25, An-2, Bayraktar TB2, Bayraktar Akıncı, IAI Harop, SkyStriker
- Electronic warfare: Elbit Hermes 900
- Fighter: JF-17 Thunder, MiG-29
- Helicopter: Mil Mi-17, Ka-32, Bell 412
- Attack helicopter: Mil Mi-24, Mil Mi-35M
- Trainer helicopter: PZL Mi-2
- Reconnaissance: Orbiter UAV, Aerostar TUAV, Hermes 450, IAI Searcher, IAI Heron
- Trainer: Aero L-39, Super Mushshak, MiG-29UB
- Transport: C-27J, Il-76

The Azerbaijani Air Forces and Air Defense Troops (stylized as HHQ və HHM Qoşunları), composed of the Azerbaijani Air Forces (Azerbaijani: Azərbaycan Hərbi Hava Qüvvələri) and the Azerbaijani Air Defense Troops (Azərbaycan Hava Hücumundan Müdafiə Qoşunları), are the air and air defense service branch of the Azerbaijani Armed Forces.

== History ==
The Azerbaijani Air Forces trace their origin to 1919 during the short-lived Azerbaijan Democratic Republic, which had originally bought its first military aircraft on 26 June 1918. Following Azerbaijan's independence from the Soviet Union in 1991, the former Soviet air bases in the country helped to develop the Air Forces and Air Defense Troops.

On February 11, 2009, the Commander of the Air Force, Lieutenant General Rail Rzayev, was assassinated outside his home by an unidentified armed assailant. Rzayev had been reportedly negotiating closer ties with the United States regarding air force modernisation before his death, possibly including the acquisition of US fighter aircraft. He was succeeded by Major-General Altay Mehdiyev who was appointed the new Commander of the Air Forces on 12 May 2009.

== Structure ==
Brinkster.net reported in October 2004 that the Azerbaijani Air and Air Defense Force comprised a fighter squadron at Nasosnaya Air Base with MiG-25PDs and training variants, a bomber aviation regiment at Kyurdamir with Su-17/24/25, MiG-21s, and L-29/39s, a transport aviation squadron at Ganja Airport with Il-76s(?), Аn-12/24, and Тu-134s, a helicopter squadron at Baku Kala Air Base with Mi-2/8/24s, two aircraft repair factories, and two air defense missile units. Other air bases include Dollyar Air Base (which Jane's Sentinel says is reported to be non-operational), Nakhchivan Airport in the Nakhchivan exclave, Sanqacal Air Base, and Sitalcay Air Base.

The units at Nasosnaya, Kyurdamir and the helicopter force at Baku Kala now appear to be numbered the 408th, 411th, and 843rd units.

=== Air Defense Force ===
The Air Defense Force is a component of the Air and Air Defense Force of Azerbaijan. There are some installations of the Cold War era left by the Soviets in 1990.

=== Unmanned Systems Forces ===
The Unmanned Systems Forces (Azerbaijani: İnsansız Sistem Qoşunlarının) is a branch of the Air Force. The branch was presented for the first time at the Victory Day parade in November 2025. It conducts drone warfare using unmanned Turkish and Israeli drones on land and air. It is led by Colonel Adem Huseynov.

== Education ==
The Azerbaijan Higher Military Aviation School is the educational institution of the Azerbaijani Air Force and a branch of the education system of the Ministry of Defense of Azerbaijan. In 1997, the school graduated its first class of military pilots. By presidential decree of 24 December 2015, the school was abolished and transferred to the Azerbaijan Higher Military Academy with the establishment of the corresponding faculties there.

Azerbaijani pilots are trained at the Azerbaijan Air Force School and then develop their skills further within their units. Azerbaijan has an experience exchange with Turkey, the United States, Ukraine, and a number of other NATO countries. Turkish Air Force School plays a great role in the training of military pilots. The Azerbaijani pilots are also trained in Ukraine's Pilot Training School.

There has been a UAV Academy (Azerbaijani: Pilotsuz Uçuş Aparatları Akademiyası) operating since February 2024.

== Infrastructure ==
The United States is the most active participant in the modernisation of Air Force airfields. Airfields in Gala and the Nasosnaya Air Base near Haji Zeynalabidin settlement have been modernised with US support as part of the Azerbaijan-NATO Individual Partnership Action Plan. Special equipment were installed there to provide flight security. The starting command points, engineering control systems and engineering air force service were provided with new buildings. Negotiations over the modernisation of Kurdamir airfield are currently under way. An advanced Flight Control System has been installed at Dollyar Air Base with support from the United States.

Since September 2008, Turkey has helped to modernise the Air Force central command headquarters. According to a Turkish-Azerbaijani agreement, a NATO standard central command management center will be installed there. A great number of projects such as joint manufacture of unmanned aircraft will be implemented with Turkey in the near future.

The Gabala OTH Radar was operated by the Russian Space Forces. The radar station had a range of up to 6,000 kilometres (3,728 mi), and was designed to detect missile launches as far as from the Indian Ocean. It is not known whether Russia shared any of the radar's data with Azerbaijan. The equipment was dismantled and sent back to Russia after 2012.

In 2006, the US provided Azerbaijani military with additional radar installations. Plans were announced for the US to modernize one radar station near the Iranian border at Lerik and another near the border with Georgia at Agstafa. Joint work also commenced on two radar stations on the Russia-Azerbaijani border and Iran-Azerbaijani border to monitor Caspian Sea traffic.

== Equipment ==
=== Aircraft ===
The MiG-29 has been designated as the standard aircraft for the AzAF. In September–October 2010, Azerbaijan purchased 24 Mi-35M from Rostvertol. 8 of them have been delivered in the end of the first quarter of 2012 and four more in August 2012. With the arrival of the MiG-29s, the Air Force appears to have retired the MiG-25PDS aircraft that it used to fly from Nasosnaya Air Base. IISS estimates in 2007 reported 26 as still in service; other figures previously placed the total as high as 38.

The Air Force retains in store and L-39 fighter training aircraft produced in the Czech Republic and Ukraine.

Azerbaijan also manufactures Israeli-designed spy planes. Among the licensed UAVs is the Orbiter-2M and the Aerostar. Both are manufactured at the government-owned Azad Systems Company plant near Baku. The head of the Defense Industry, Yaver Jamalov, said that by the end of 2011 a total of 60 UAVs will be produced.

In 2016 three Bell 412 helicopters were purchased from Canada, and by 2018 a number of pilots were trained in the type. A further undisclosed number of Bell 407 and MD-530 helicopters were obtained but neither type is currently operational as pilots have not been trained yet.

In 2023, a contract was signed for the modernization of Su-25s currently in use by the Azerbaijani Air Force. The project aimed to carry out the integration of Turkish Guided Ammunition Weapon Systems and avionics into the aircraft.

In 2025, a contract worth US$4.6 billion was signed with Pakistan for the purchase of 40 JF-17 Block 3 multirole combat aircraft for the Azerbaijani Air Force, including the aircraft, training, and ordnance. 5 newly-delivered JF-17 Block 3 aircraft participated in a flypast over Baku on 8 November 2025 during Azerbaijan's Victory Day parade.

On 6 April 2025, some news sources announced that Azerbaijan received its first SOM cruise missiles and conducted launch tests.

==== Current inventory ====
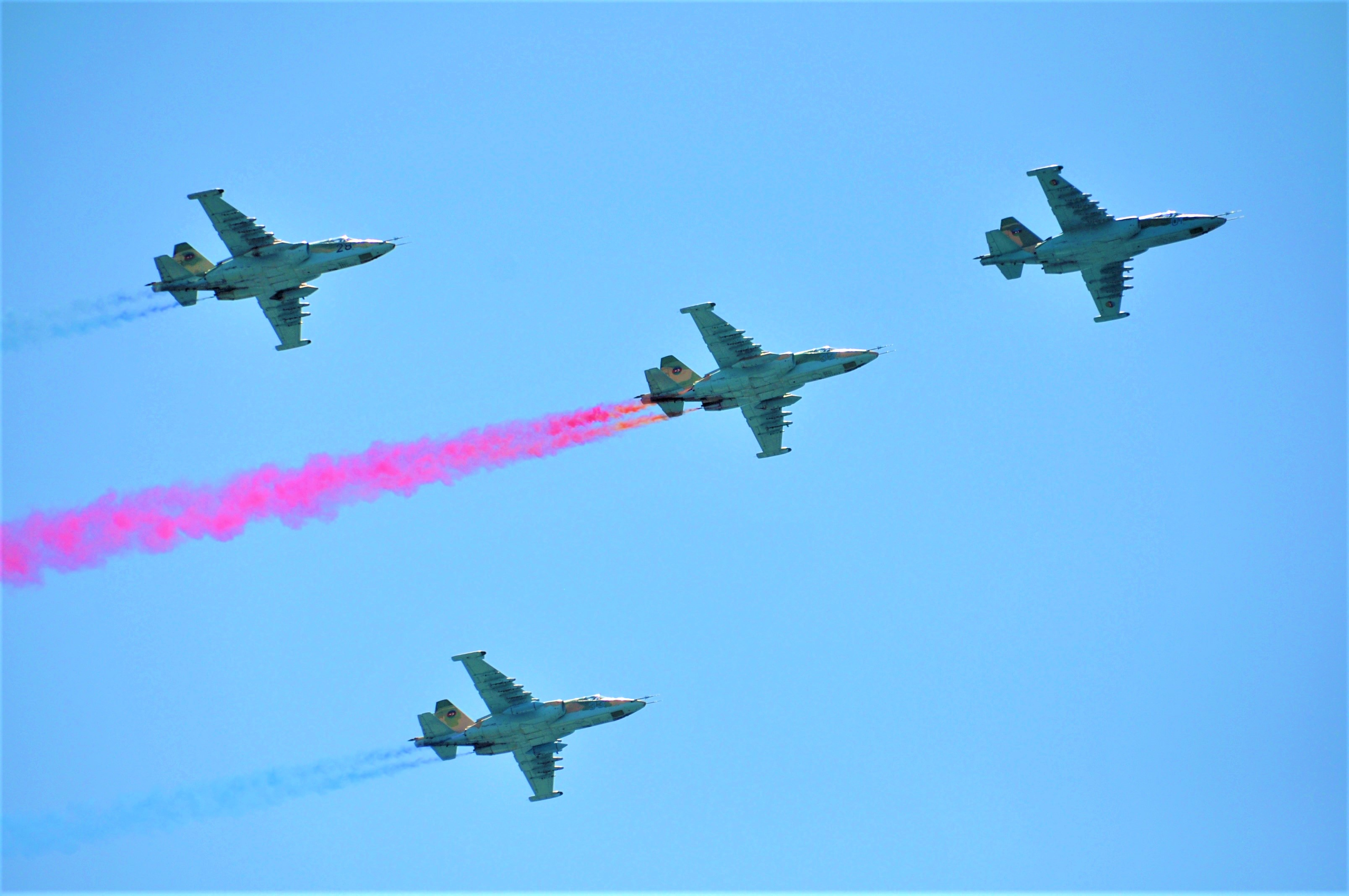
Azerbaijani Air Force Su-25s perform a fly-by on Army Day 2011

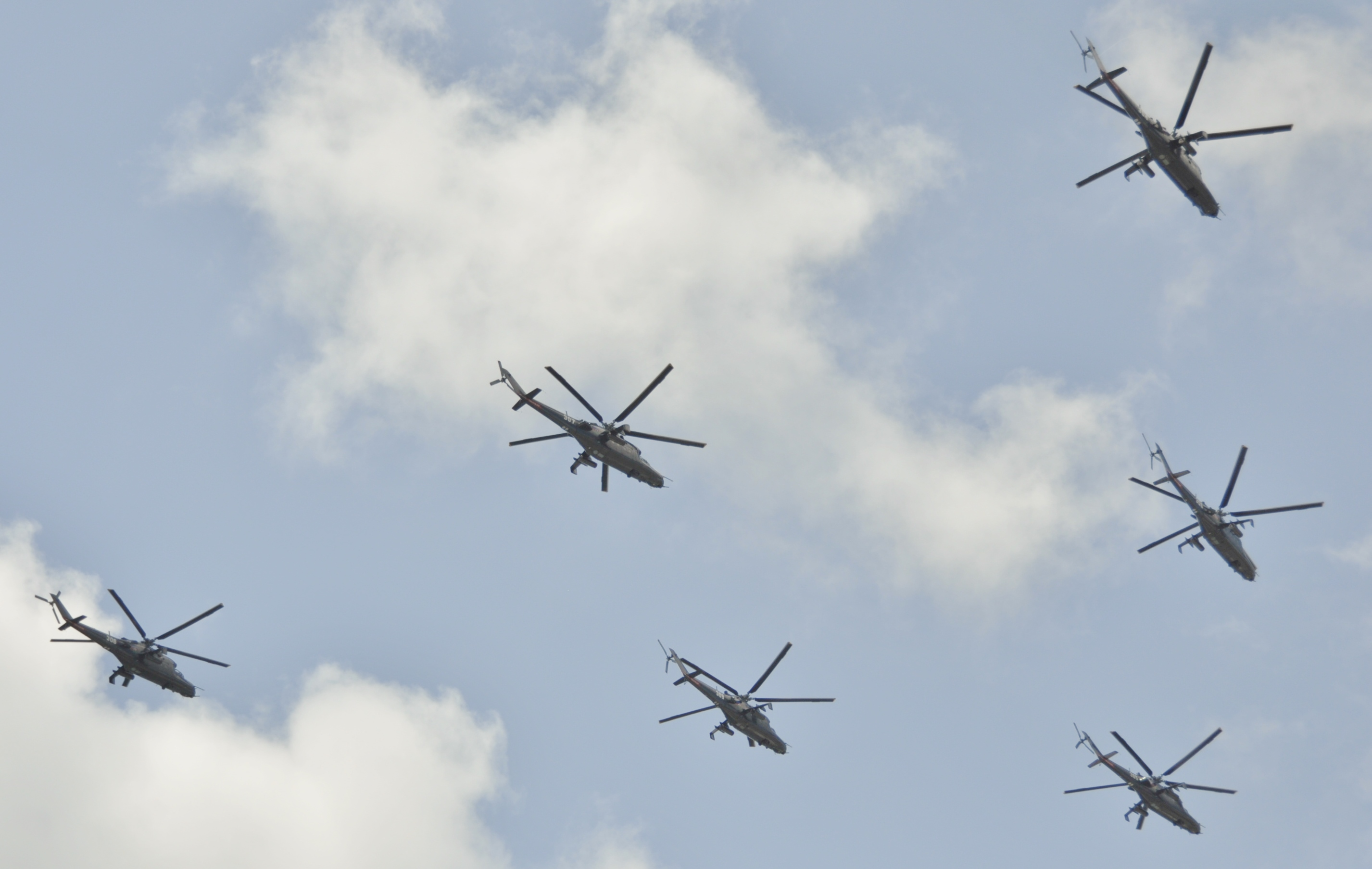
Air Force Mil Mi-24s fly over during an army parade

Aircraft	Origin	Type	Variant	In service	Notes
Combat aircraft
JF-17 Thunder	China / Pakistan	Multirole	JF-17 Block 3	9	40 ordered in a reported $4.6 billion agreement. Assigned to the newly raised 408th "Jaguar" Squadron out of Nasosnaya Air Base. 31 remaining aircraft on order with full operational capability targeted for late 2027.
MiG-29	Soviet Union	Multirole	MiG-29A 9.13	11	3 used for conversion training
MiG-29	Soviet Union	Multirole	MiG-29UB	3	3 used for conversion training
Sukhoi Su-25	Soviet Union	Attack	Su-25ML	20	Su-25UB used for training
Sukhoi Su-25	Soviet Union	Attack	Su-25UB	1	Su-25UB used for training
Transport
Boeing 767	United States	Transport	767-300ER	1	Leased from AZAL
Ilyushin Il-76	Soviet Union	Transport		2	
C-27J Spartan	Italy	Transport		2	
Helicopters
Bell 407	United States	Utility		1	
Bell 412	United States	Utility	AB-412	3	
Mil Mi-17	Russia	Transport / Utility	Mi-17-1V	33	
Mil Mi-8	Russia	Transport / Utility	Mi-8MTV-1	8	
Mil Mi-24	Russia	Attack	Mi-24V/Mi-35M	16	
Kamov Ka-27	Russia	Utility	Ka-32S	3	
MD 500	United States	Utility	MD-530F	1	
Trainer aircraft
Aero L-39	Czech Republic	Jet trainer		14	
Mil Mi-2	Poland	Rotorcraft trainer		7	
PAC MFI-17 Mushshak	Pakistan	Trainer	MFI-395 Super Mushshak	10	
TAI Hurkus	Turkey	Trainer	Hürkuş-II		14 on order.
UAVs
Bayraktar Akinci	Turkey	UCAV		N/A	Unknown quantity delivered.
Bayraktar TB2	Turkey	UCAV		N/A	Unknown quantity delivered.
IAI Harop	Israel	LM		N/C	
Hermes 450	Israel	Surveillance		12	Two are Hermes 900
IAI Heron	Israel	Surveillance		5	
IAI Searcher	Israel	Surveillance		5	
Orbiter	Israel	Surveillance		10	Produced in Azerbaijan
Aerostar	Israel	Surveillance		4	Produced in Azerbaijan

=== Air defense ===
Azerbaijan has also a number of missile systems covering Azerbaijani airspace. The S-75 Dvina has been installed around Baku and additional installations are near the border with Iran and Dagestan. Some are installed to defend against Armenian aircraft. In terms of numbers, the IISS reported in 2002 that Azerbaijan had 100 S-75 Dvina, S-125 Neva/Pechora, and S-200 systems. Among them are the medium range 2K11 Krug (retired in 2021), for short range the 9K33 Osa and the 9K35 Strela-10 mobile SAM and the ZSU-23-4 Shilka vehicles to cover the armored forces against airstrikes. Azerbaijan has also lighter AA guns and MANPADS of varying quality.

In 2009 Azerbaijan's Defense Ministry signed a contract with Russia's Rosoboronexport company to buy two battalions of S-300PMU-2 Favorit.

In January 2012, Azerbaijan and Israel signed a $1.6 billion deal that includes anti-aircraft and missile defense systems.

==== Current inventory ====
Name	Origin	Type	In service	Notes
SAM				
	iron Dome - Missile Defense	India / Israel	SAM system	Unknown quantity
	Barak 8	India / Israel	SAM system	Unknown quantity
S-300PMU2	Russia	SAM system	2 units with 200 missiles	
Pechora-2TM	Russia	SAM system	3 units	
9K37 Buk-M1	Russia	Mobile SAM system	2 units	
Igla-S/SA-24	Russia	MANPADS	1000	

== Future developments ==
Jane's said in 2009 that 'efforts to acquire more modern hardware are understood to have been underway for several years, but funding constraints proved to be a stumbling block. Until quite recently, only limited success was achieved, with the most significant addition to the inventory being a handful of Su-25s that were obtained from Georgia in 2002. In 2007, however, Azerbaijan took delivery of the first of a substantial number of MiG-29 'Fulcrum' fighters. These are understood to have originated from disparate sources, including Belarus, Russia and Ukraine, with at least some having been overhauled at Odesa in Ukraine prior to delivery.

In January 2008, Azerbaijan engaged in talks with Pakistan over the JF-17 Thunder's possible sale to Azerbaijan. In 2015, the Azerbaijani Air Forces negotiated with China for several dozen JF-17s worth approximately US$16 to 18 million each. In 2018, Pakistani Armed Forces actively discussed military and defence cooperation with Azerbaijan, culminating in the latter expressing an interest in purchasing the fighter jet. In December 2018, Turan, an independent Azerbaijani news agency, reported that the negotiations between Azerbaijan and Pakistan on the purchase of JF-17 Block II combat aircraft were coming to the end. In December 2019, Azerbaijan, eyeing military cooperation with Pakistan, again expressed its interest in purchasing the aircraft. In 2025, Azerbaijan finalized the purchase of 40 JF-17 Block III fighter jets for $4.6 billion, bringing the cost to approximately $115 million per aircraft.

On 20 February 2020, Azerbaijan's Defense Minister Zakir Hasanov signed a preliminary agreement on the procurement of Alenia Aermacchi M-346 Master during the President Ilham Aliyev's visit to Italy on that day. The Air Force plans to purchase 10-15 aircraft.

== Accidents and incidents ==
- 29 January 2008: An Azerbaijani Air Force MiG-29UB crashed into the Caspian Sea during a training flight. Both crew members on board the MiG-29UB were killed.
- 3 March 2010: An Azerbaijani Air Force Su-25 crashed in the Tovuz region of Azerbaijan, killing the pilot, Famil Mammadli.
- 3 February 2011: An Azerbaijani Air and Air Defense Force Su-25UB crashed in the Kurdamir region of Azerbaijan. Both crew members were not injured.
- 24 July 2019: During a night training flight, a MiG-29 fighter of the Azerbaijani Air Force crashed into the Caspian Sea after a bird strike. The pilot was killed in the crash.
- 28 February 2022: Three Azerbaijani MiG-29 fighters were destroyed by Russian rocket attacks while undergoing repairs at Lviv State Aircraft Plant in Ukraine.

== Ranks ==
=== Commissioned officer ranks ===
The rank insignia of commissioned officers.

Rank group	General / flag officers			Senior officers			Junior officers
Azerbaijani Air Force
Azerbaijani Air Force	General-polkovnik	General-leytenant	General-mayor	Polkovnik	Polkovnik-leytenant	Mayor	Kapitan	Baş leytenant	Leytenant	Kiçik leytenant

=== Other ranks ===
The rank insignia of non-commissioned officers and enlisted personnel.

Rank group	Senior NCOs						Junior NCOs	Enlisted
Azerbaijani Air Force								No insignia
Azerbaijani Air Force	Baş gizir	Gizir	Kiçik gizir	Baş çavuş	Çavuş	Kiçik çavuş	Baş əsgər	Əsgər

== See also ==
- Azerbaijani Land Forces
- Military history of Azerbaijan
