= Azerbaijan–Palestine relations =

- Azerbaijan: Palestine

The relations between the Republic of Azerbaijan and the State of Palestine were established in 1992 with both nations recognizing each other. Palestine has an embassy in Baku, while Azerbaijan does not have an embassy in Palestine.

== History ==
The official diplomatic relations between the two countries began on 15 April 1992 with the non-resident representation of Palestine in Azerbaijan until the opening of the Embassy of the State of Palestine in the Azerbaijani capital Baku officially by President Mahmoud Abbas on 29 June 2011.

Azerbaijan is considered to be one of the closest Muslim countries to Israel, which means it is not a steadfast supporter of Palestine unlike other Muslim nations. Despite this, Azerbaijan maintains a close and productive relationship with Palestine.

In 2009, during a visit to Azerbaijan, Palestinian foreign minister Riyad al-Maliki said that both countries were trying to restore their territorial integrity, so they must cooperate closely within international organizations.

In April 2018, Riyad al-Maliki again visited Azerbaijan and said that the Palestinian state and its people support Azerbaijan's position in the Armenia-Azerbaijan Nagorno-Karabakh conflict and its settlement according to international law.

Azerbaijan hosted the meeting of ambassadors of the State of Palestine in the Asian countries on 5 November 2018.

== Cultural ==
Many Palestinian students study in Azerbaijani universities.

== See also ==
- Foreign relations of Azerbaijan
- Foreign relations of Palestine
- Azerbaijan–Israel relations
