= For military services medal =

Military medal of Azerbaijan

For military services medal "Hərbi xidmətlərə görə" medalı
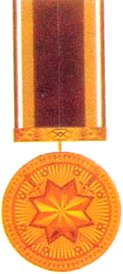
- Type: Individual Award
- Awarded for: Bravery and courage shown in defense of the sovereignty and territorial integrity of Azerbaijan Republic.
- Presented by: President of Azerbaijan
- Clasps: 1
- Status: Active
- Established: December 6, 1993. Decree No. 759

For military services medal (Azerbaijani: "Hərbi xidmətlərə görə" medalı) – is a military medal of Azerbaijan.

== History ==
The award was established on December 6, 1993 by the former president of Azerbaijan Heydar Aliyev. The medal is awarded to military servants for the special distinguished services in the combat operations.

== Description ==
For military services medal is a shield-shaped round plate with a diameter of 35 mm, with round ornaments and rays beginning from the center and made of bronze with narrow plate with national ornaments. There is an eight-ended star and two crossing swords behind the star in the center of the shield.

Rare side of the medal is flat with “For military services” ligature and the medal’s number below the ligature carved on it. The medal is attached to a brown rectangular satin ribbon of 27mmx43mm with a ring and hook. There is a 27mmx9mm form made of satin ribbon with a crescent and star on it, with an element for pinning the medal to the chest.

== The way of wearing ==
This medal is worn on the left side of the chest, if there is any other orders and medals of Azerbaijan, it is placed after Taraggi Medal.

== Recipients ==
- Zakir Hasanov
- Elchin Valiyev
- Ismayil Gurbanov
- Vugar Mammadov
- Mushfig Babayev
- Vagif Dargahli
- Ali Naghiyev
- Namig Islamzadeh
