= Namig Islamzade =

Azerbaijani military officer

Hero of the Patriotic War Namig Islamzade
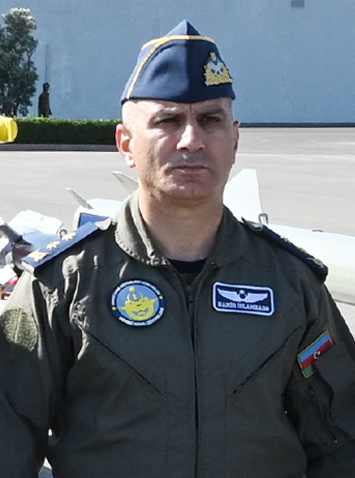
- Islamzade in 2024
- Born: 7 May 1974 (age 52); Yeni Daşkənd, Barda District, Azerbaijani SSR, Soviet Union
- Allegiance: Azerbaijani Armed Forces
- Branch: Azerbaijani Air Force
- Rank: Lieutenant General
- Commands: Azerbaijani Air Force
- Conflicts: Second Nagorno-Karabakh War
- Awards: For military services medal; Azerbaijani Flag Order; Hero of the Patriotic War

Namig Sarafruz oglu Islamzade (Azerbaijani: Namiq Sərəfruz oğlu İslamzadə; born 1974), is an Azerbaijani military officer, lieutenant general serving as Commander of the Azerbaijani Air Forces since September 2024. Islamzade is a participant of the 2020 Nagorno-Karabakh war.

== Early years ==
Namig Sarafruz oglu Islamzade was born on 7 May 1974, in Yeni Daşkənd, Barda District.

Between 1981 and 1988, he studied at secondary school No. 76, and from 1988 to 1991, he went to a Jamshid Nakhichevanski Military Lyceum. In 1992 he entered the Azerbaijan Higher Military Academy.

== Military service ==
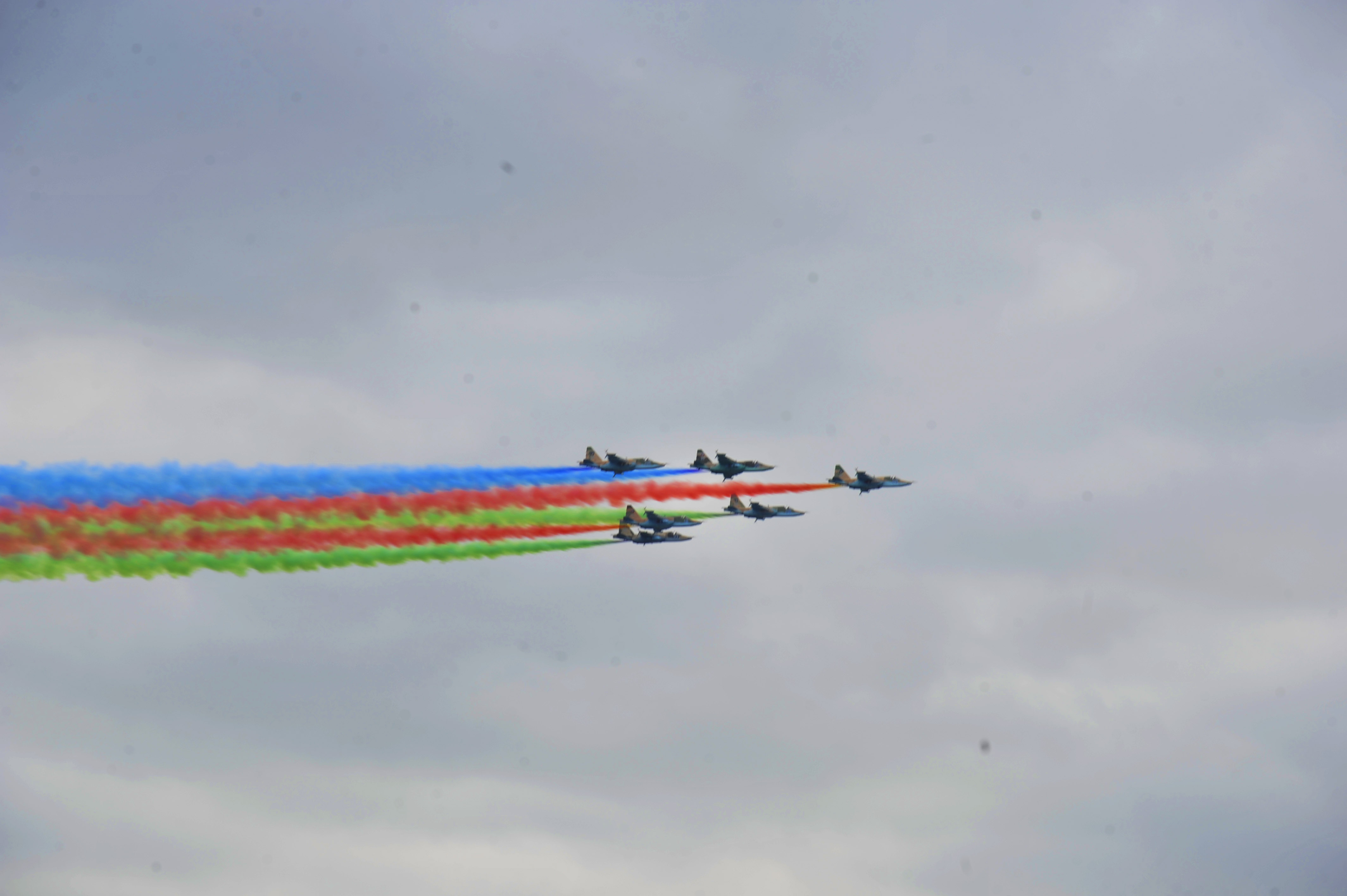
Sukhoi Su-25 aircraft belonging to the Azerbaijani Air Forces, led by Major General Namig Islamzade, flying over Baku during the Baku Victory Parade on 10 December 2020.

Islamzade is currently serving in the Azerbaijani Air Forces, belonging to the Azerbaijani Armed Forces. He has contributed to the modernization of Azerbaijan's air forces throughout his service years. He is graduated from Turkish Air Force Academy in 1996.

Islamzade, by 2005, was a major, and by 2008, a lieutenant colonel. By 2016, Islamzade, as a colonel, was serving as a garrison commander in the "N" military unit of the Azerbaijani Air Forces in Kurdamir District.

Islamzade took part in the 2020 Nagorno-Karabakh war. On 10 December 2020, a victory parade was held in Baku on the occasion of Azerbaijan's victory in the war. During the parade, a group of Sukhoi Su-25 aircraft flew over the city, led by Namig Islamzade, to show the colors of the Azerbaijani flag.

== Awards ==
- Islamzade was awarded the For military services medal on 24 June 2005 by the decree of the President of Azerbaijan, Ilham Aliyev.
- Islamzade was awarded the Azerbaijani Flag Order on 25 June 2008 by the decree of the President Aliyev.
- Islamzade was awarded the For Fatherland Order on 25 June 2020 by the decree of President Aliyev.
- Islamzade was awarded the rank of major general on 7 December 2020, which is the highest military rank in the Azerbaijani Armed Forces, by the decree of President Ilham Aliyev.
- Islamzade was awarded the title of the Hero of the Patriotic War on 9 December 2020, which is the highest honorary title in Azerbaijan, by the decree of the President Ilham Aliyev.
