= Hacı Zeynalabdin =

- Municipality
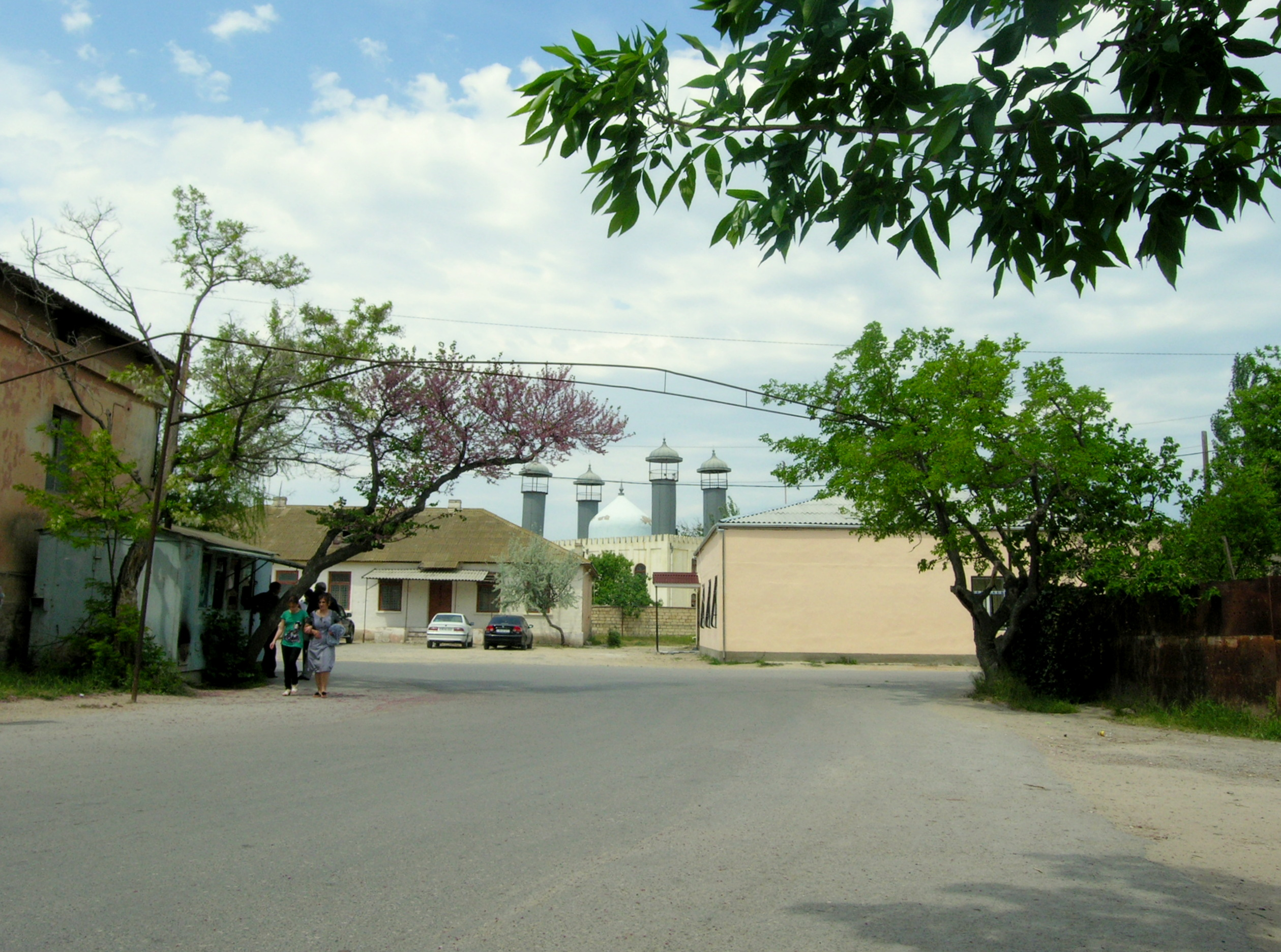

- Location within Azerbaijan
- Coordinates: 40°37′24″N 49°33′31″E
- Country: Azerbaijan
- City: Sumqayit

Population
  - Total: 20,929
- Time zone: UTC+4 (AZT)
  - Summer (DST): UTC+5 (AZT)

Hacı Zeynalabdin (also, Hacı Zeynalabdin Tağiyev, Nasoslu, Nasosnaya, Nasosnyy, and Nassosny) is a village and municipality in Sumqayit, Azerbaijan. It has a population of 20,929. The place was named after Zeynalabdin Taghiyev.

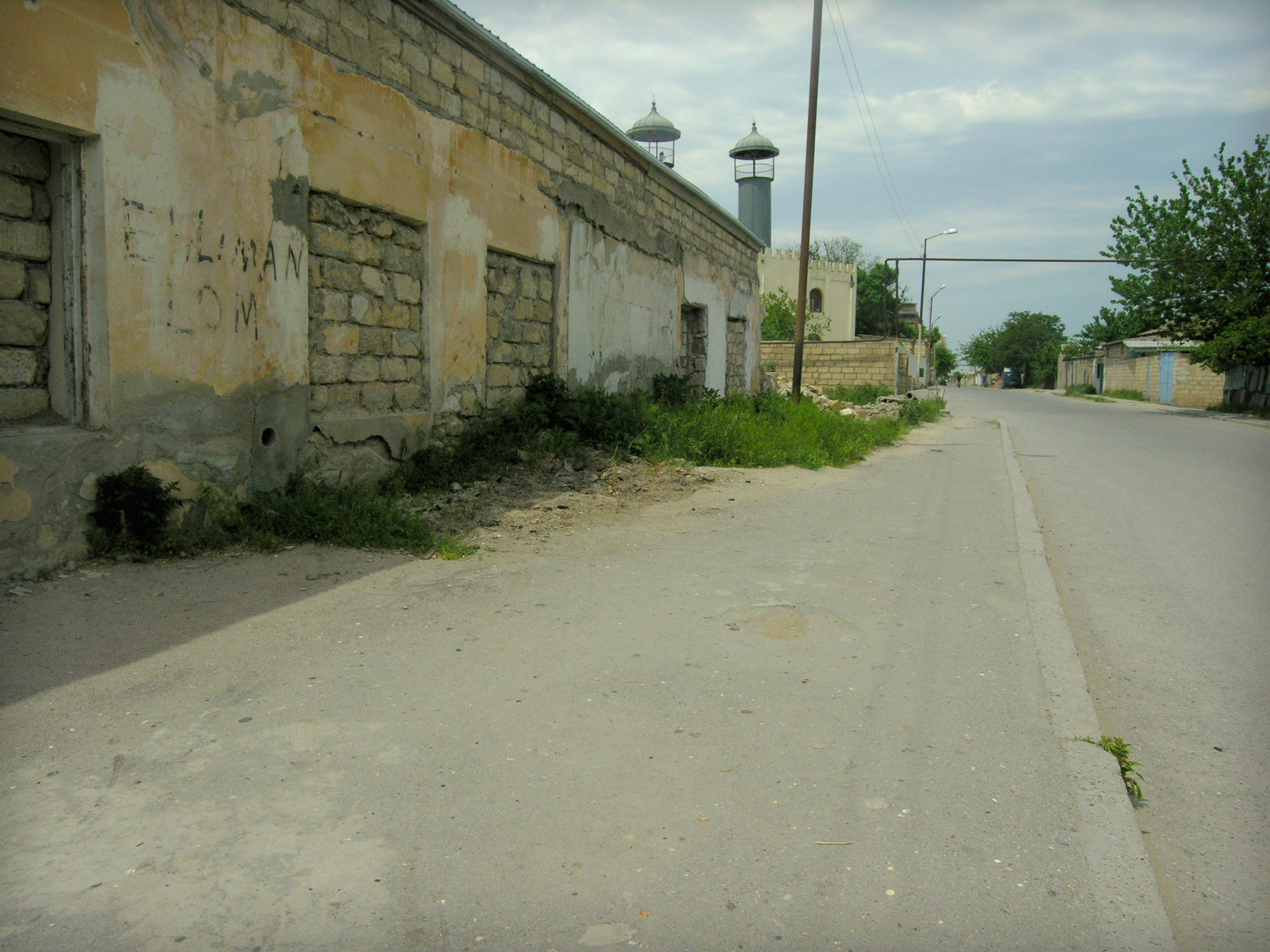
Street in the village
