= Sitalçay =

- Municipality
- Location within Azerbaijan
- Coordinates: 40°47′02″N 49°24′02″E
- Country: Azerbaijan
- Rayon: Khizi

Population
  - Total: 1,234
- Time zone: UTC+4 (AZT)
  - Summer (DST): UTC+5 (AZT)

Sitalçay (also, Sitalchay) is a village and municipality in the Khizi Rayon of Azerbaijan. It has a population of 1,234.

The Sitalchay Military Airbase was located near the settlement.
