= Atchugarry =

Atchugarry is a surname. Notable people with the surname include:

- Alejandro Atchugarry (1952–2017), Uruguayan lawyer and politician
- Pablo Atchugarry (born 1954), Uruguayan artist

== See also ==
- Atchugarry Museum of Contemporary Art
- Fundacion Pablo Atchugarry
