= Palazzo di Prospero Visconti =

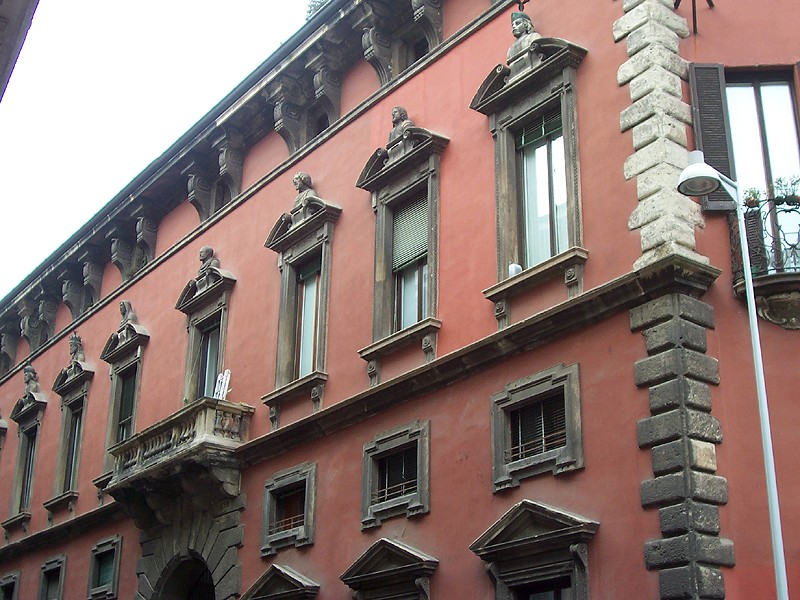
- Palazzo di Prospero Visconti
- Interactive map of the Palazzo di Prospero Visconti area

General information
- Status: In use
- Type: Palace
- Architectural style: Renaissance architecture
- Location: Milan, Italy, 2, via Lanzone
- Coordinates: 45.46077°N 9.179241°E
- Construction started: 16th century

Design and construction
- Architect: Giuseppe Meda

The Palazzo di Prospero Visconti' is a 16th-century palace in Milan. Historically belonging to the sestiere di Porta Ticinese, it is located in via Lanzone 2, in the ancient contrada del Torchio no. 2,919.

== History and description ==
The palace was built between 1589 and 1591 to a design by Giuseppe Meda with the collaboration of Pellegrino Tibaldi. Hardly hit by World War II bombing, only the façade remains of the original building, enclosed by ashlar pilasters: the palace is centred on the ashlar portal, typical of Lombard late Renaissance architecture, surmounted by the Visconti coat of arms and the balcony on the piano nobile; the windows have simple triangular tympanums. On the upper floor we note the curved window pediments with carved busts of the Visconti family of Milan and of Filippo II and Philip III of Spain.

== See also ==
- Palazzo Spinola (Milano)

== Bibliography ==
=== Italian sources ===
- Silvio Leydi, Rossana Sacchi, Il Cinquecento, Milano, NodoLibri, 1999, ISBN 88-7185-082-3.
- Attilia Lanza, Marilea Somarè, Milano e i suoi palazzi: porta Orientale, Romana e Ticinese, Vimercate, Libreria Meravigli editrice, 1992, ISBN non esistente.
