= London Supply Group =

Argentinian company, founded 1942

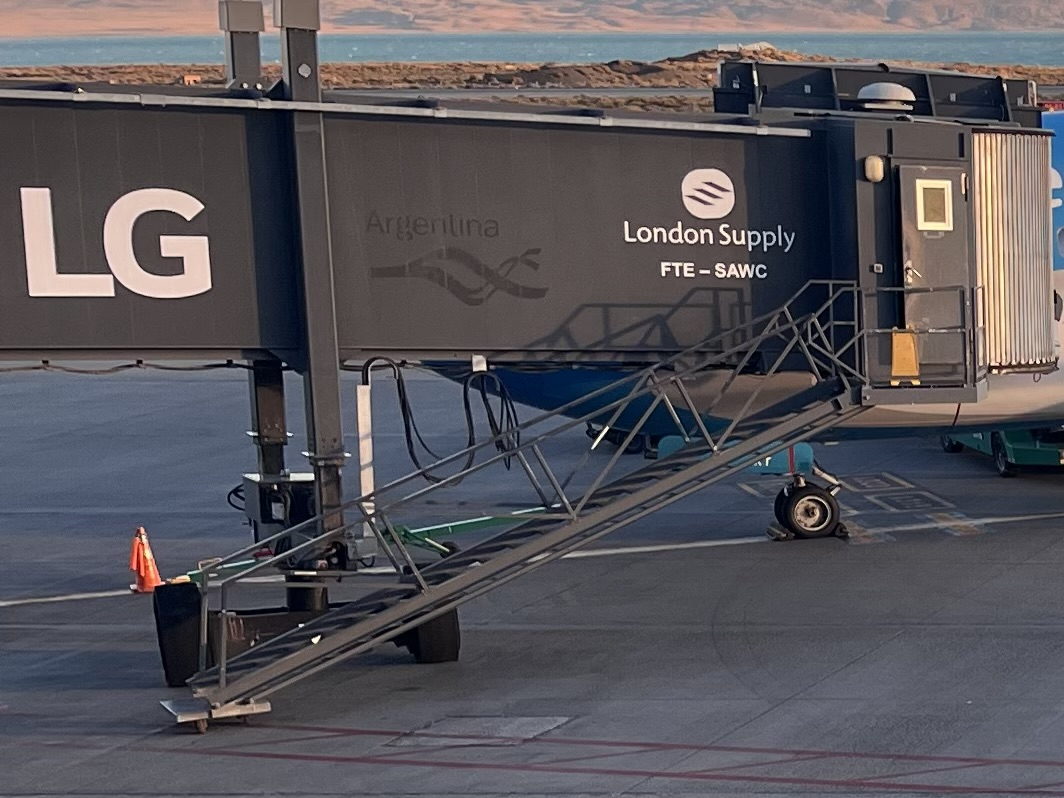
- A jet bridge bearing the logo of the London Supply Group
- Industry: Marine and Airport Supply
- Founded: 4 February 1942
- Founder: José Tarantuty
- Headquarters: Buenos Aires, Argentina
- Area served: Argentina and Uruguay
- Key people: Teddy Taratudy (President)
- Brands: Duty Free Shop Atlantico Sur; Duty Free Shop Puerto Iguazu; Patagonia Shops Rio Gallegos; Frontier Wood Pellets
- Revenue: US $25,500,000
- Number of employees: 1,200
- Subsidiaries: London Supply; LSG Foundation
- Website: www.londonsupplygroup.com

The London Supply Group S.A. is a marine supply and airport management firm based in Buenos Aires, Argentina. The company was founded on 4 February 1942 and started out selling duty-free merchandise to ships in port. Today, the company is the largest duty-free retailer in Argentina. The group owns several subsidiaries and brands across their portfolio including several duty-free chains, a charitable foundation, and their airport management division. The company employs 1200 workers across their stores and offices. The majority of LSG operations take place in Buenos Aires, Puerto Iguazu, and El Calafate. Today, the company serves 19 marine and airports across Argentina and Uruguay.

== History ==
=== Foundation and early history ===
London Supply Group was founded by José Taratuty on 4 February 1942 as a marine supplier for ships in the Port of Buenos Aires. The company was given a decree authorizing them to sell duty-free products and tax-exempt goods to ships travelling overseas. London Supply became the exclusive vendor for products manufactured by Massalin Particulares and Nobleza Piccardo. In 1955, London Supply secured a contract from Phillip Morris International for the import and distribution rights for sales in the Argentine Republic.

=== Duty-free ===
In 1976, LSG began offering boutique services at the port of Tierra Del Fuego to passengers of the Fleet Fluvial Argentina cruise line. In 1979, The shop became an official duty-free shop under the Atlántico Sur brand.

=== Airports ===
In 1992, London Supply entered the airport management industry when it secured a contract for the construction and operation of the Punta Del Este Airport (ICAO: SUPE) in Uruguay. The airport is the second largest in Uruguay and sees over 2 million passengers per year. The airport was designed by Uruguayan-Canadian Architect Carlos Ott.

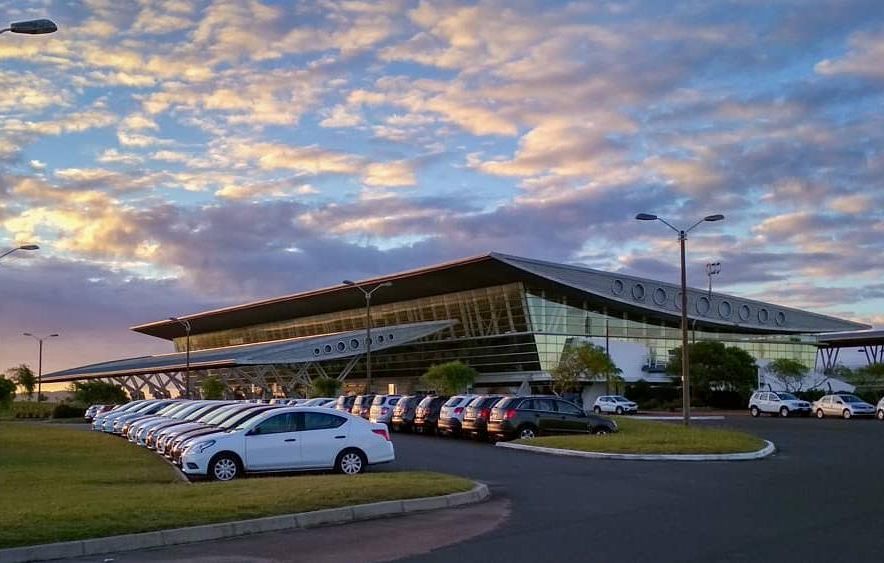
Punta Del Este Airport

== Current operations ==
=== Airport operation ===
London Supply Group operates several airports across Argentina and Uruguay. Punta Del Este was their first airport; opened in 1992. LSG also operates the El Calafate Comandante Armando Tola Intl. Airport in El Calafate, Argentina. El Calafate airport is a gateway for travel to the Los Glaciares National Park. The airport was also the home base for the Perlan Project.

Airport	ICAO	IATA	Location	Passenger Count
Capitán de Corbeta Carlos A. Curbelo	SUPE	PDP	Punta Del Este, Uruguay	165,000
Comandante Armando Tola	SAWC	FTE	El Calafate, Argentina	327,000
Almirante Marcos A. Zar	SAVT	REL	Trelew, Argentina	252,000
Ushuaia – Malvinas Argentinas	SAWH	USH	Usuaia, Argentina	512,000

=== Duty-free operations ===
LSG operates a variety of Duty-Free brands at several airports across Argentina and Uruguay. These include the duty-free shops at Tierra Del Fuego, Puerto Iguazu, and Rio Gallegos.

== See also ==
- Aeropuertos Argentina
- Transport in Argentina
- List of airports in Argentina
