= Atchugarry Museum of Contemporary Art =

Art museum in Manantiales, Uruguay

Coordinates: 34.8660°S 54.8206°W

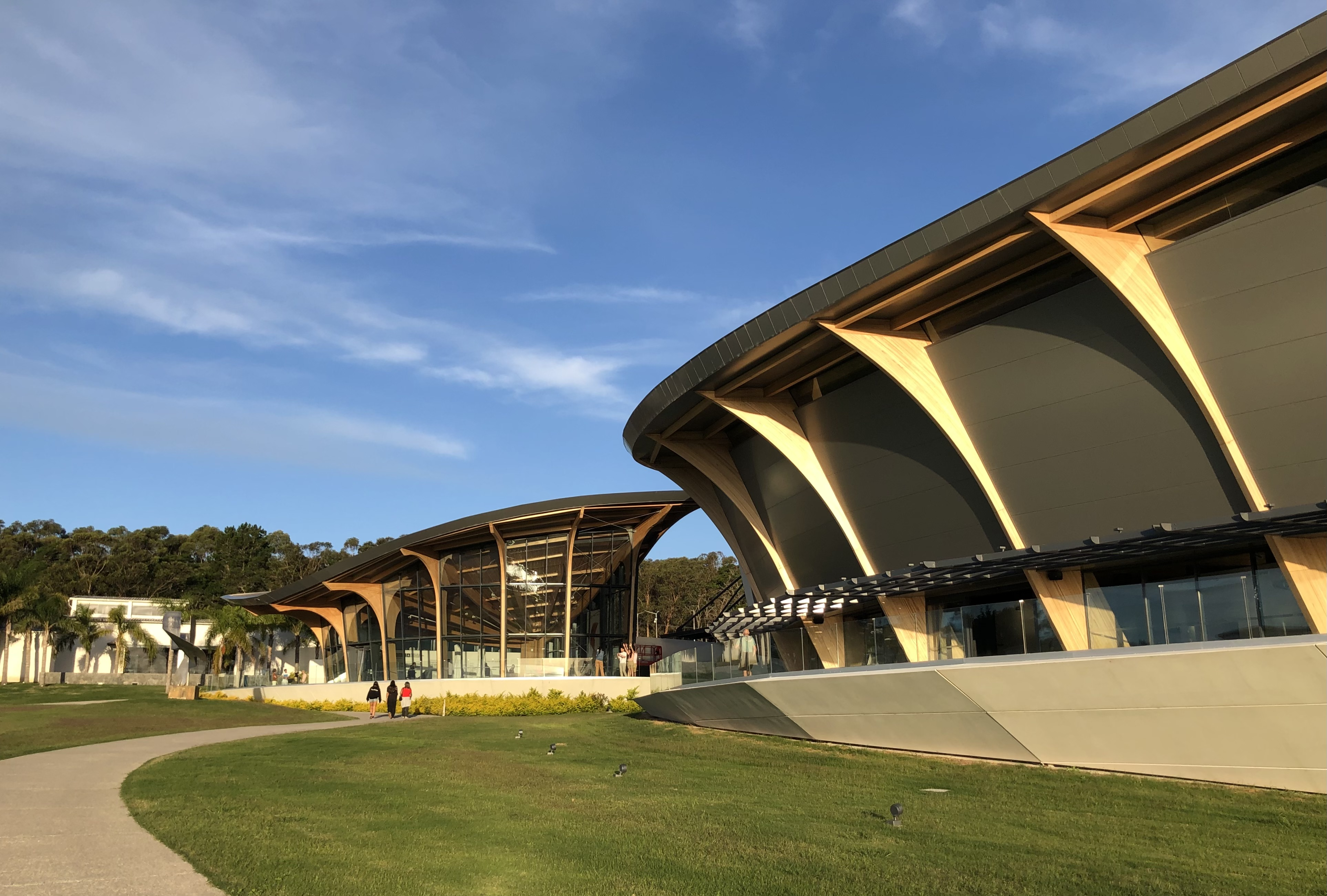
Museum

The Atchugarry Museum of Contemporary Art (in Spanish: Museo de Arte Contemporáneo Atchugarry) is a contemporary art museum in Manantiales in Uruguay. The museum is on a 90-acre landscape, and commentators called the museum the "first permanent contemporary art museum" in Uruguay.

The project was conceptualized by Uruguayan sculptor Pablo Atchugarry, and built by his Fundacion Pablo Atchugarry. The design architect was Carlos Ott for Estudio de Arquitectura Atchugarry.

The museum opened on January 8, 2022, and the opening was inaugurated by Uruguayan President Luis Lacalle Pou. The collection opens with 500 pieces including works by Wifredo Lam, Vik Muniz, Louise Nevelson, Frank Stella, and Joaquín Torres-García.
