= Comandante Armando Tola International Airport =

Airport in Santa Cruz Province, Argentina

Comandante Armando Tola International Airport Aeropuerto Internacional de El Calafate – Comandante Armando Tola
- Aerolineas Argentinas aircraft at El Calafate Airport
- IATA: FTE; ICAO: SAWC

Summary
- Airport type: Public / Military
- Operator: Government and London Supply
- Serves: El Calafate, Santa Cruz
- Location: Camino al Aeropuerto, km 23. (Z9405) El Calafate
- Elevation AMSL: 647 ft (197 m)
- Coordinates: 50°16′49″S 72°03′12″W
- Website: www.aeropuertoelcalafate.com

Map
- Location of airport in Argentina

Runways
Direction	Length		Surface
Direction	m	ft	Surface
07/25	2,649	8,688	Concrete

Statistics (2021)
- Passengers: 327,000
- Source: DAFIF, 2010 World Airport Traffic Report, ANAC Argentina

Comandante Armando Tola International Airport (Spanish: Aeropuerto Internacional de El Calafate – Comandante Armando Tola) (IATA: FTE, ICAO: SAWC) is an airport in Santa Cruz Province, Argentina. It is located approximately 21 km (13 mi) east of the city of El Calafate. The airport is jointly operated by the government and London Supply. The airport is served by Aerolíneas Argentinas, DAP and LADE. It is the westernmost Argentinian airport served by scheduled flights.

The airport was inaugurated in November 2000, replacing the old Lago Argentino Airport (ING/SAWL). The airport's design was created by Uruguayan-Canadian architect Carlos Ott. In 2010, the airport was used by over 500,000 passengers.

It was the departure and landing station for the second stage of Perlan Project.

== Airlines and destinations ==
Airlines	Destinations
Aerolíneas Argentinas	Buenos Aires–Aeroparque, Córdoba (AR), Trelew, Ushuaia; Seasonal: Buenos Aires–Ezeiza
Gol Linhas Aéreas	Seasonal: São Paulo–Guarulhos (begins 26 November 2026)
JetSmart Argentina	Buenos Aires–Aeroparque, Buenos Aires–Ezeiza
LADE	Comodoro Rivadavia, Río Gallegos, Río Grande, Ushuaia
Sky Airline	Seasonal: Santiago de Chile

== Statistics ==
Traffic by calendar year. Official ACI Statistics
	Passengers	Change from previous year	Aircraft operations	Change from previous year	Cargo (metric tons)	Change from previous year
2005	383,641	▲12.01%	4,304	▼4.97%	157	▲15.44%
2006	407,874	▲6.32%	4,387	▲1.93%	150	▼4.46%
2007	433,589	▲6.30%	5,255	▲19.79%	112	▼25.33%
2008	494,722	▲14.10%	6,355	▲20.93%	120	▲7.14%
2009	481,690	▼2.63%	6,482	▲2.00%	132	▲10.00%
2010	507,482	▲5.35%	6,589	▲1.65%	N.A.	N.A.
Source: Airports Council International. World Airport Traffic Statistics (Years 2005-2010)

== Gallery ==
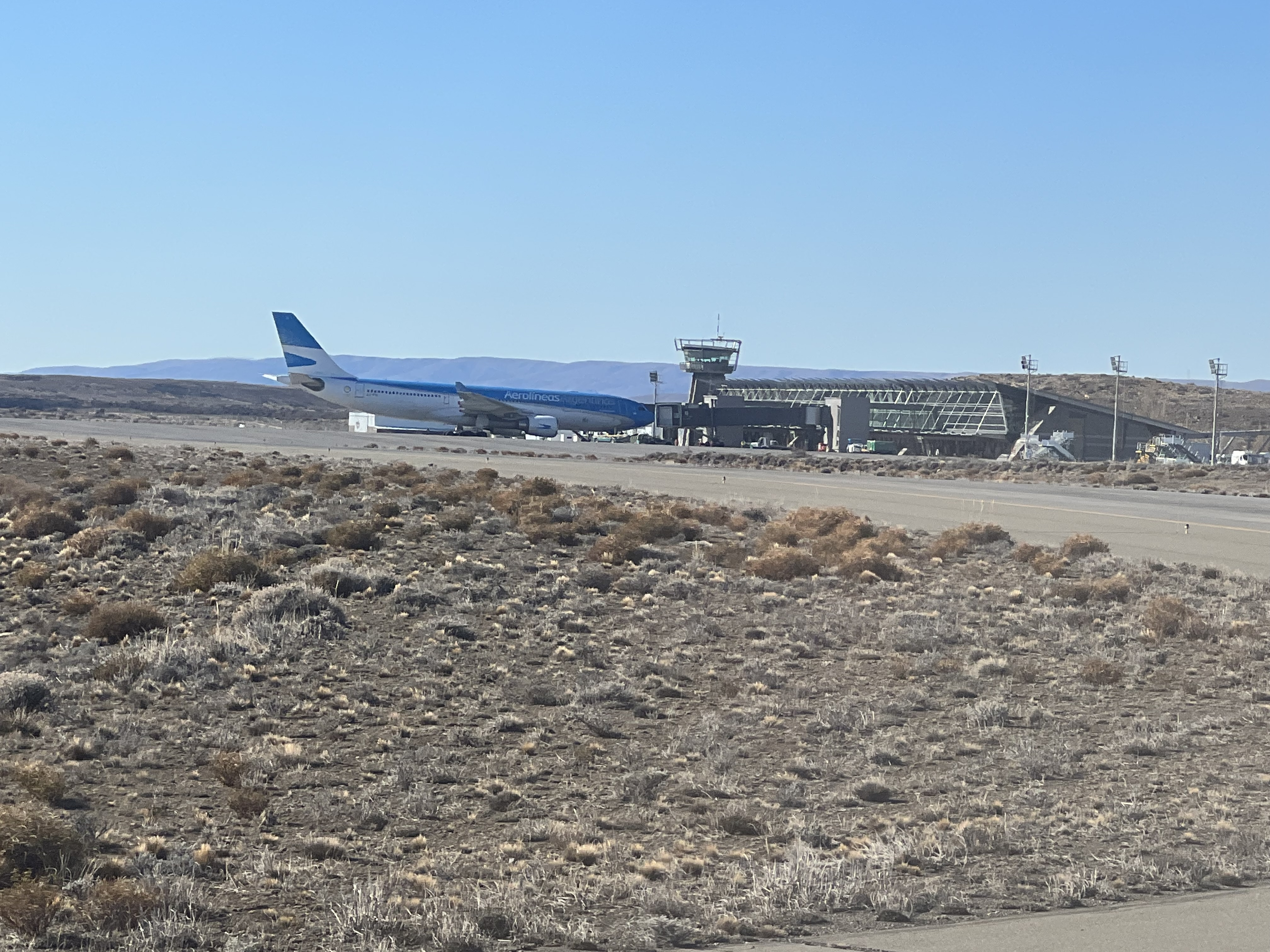

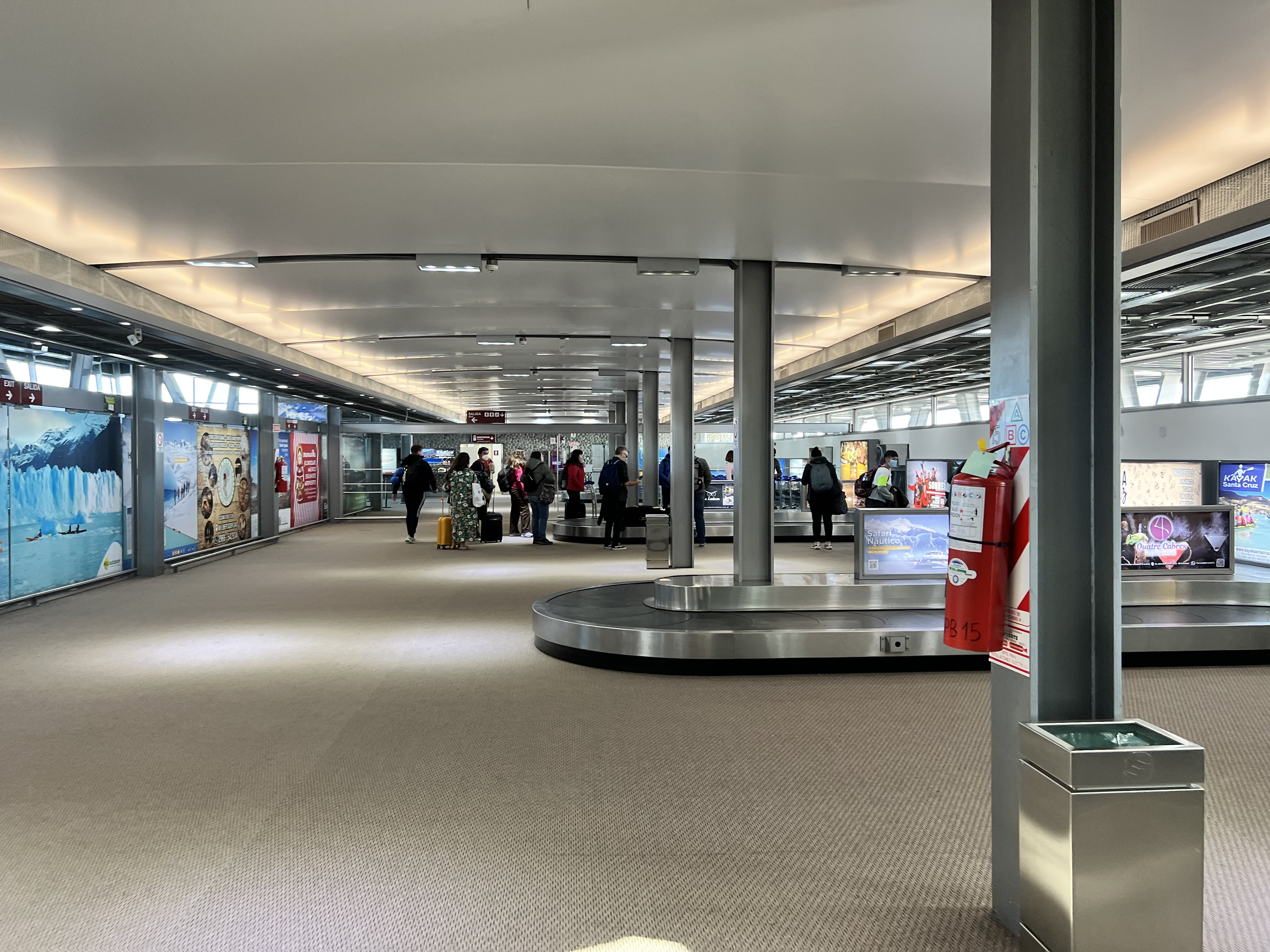

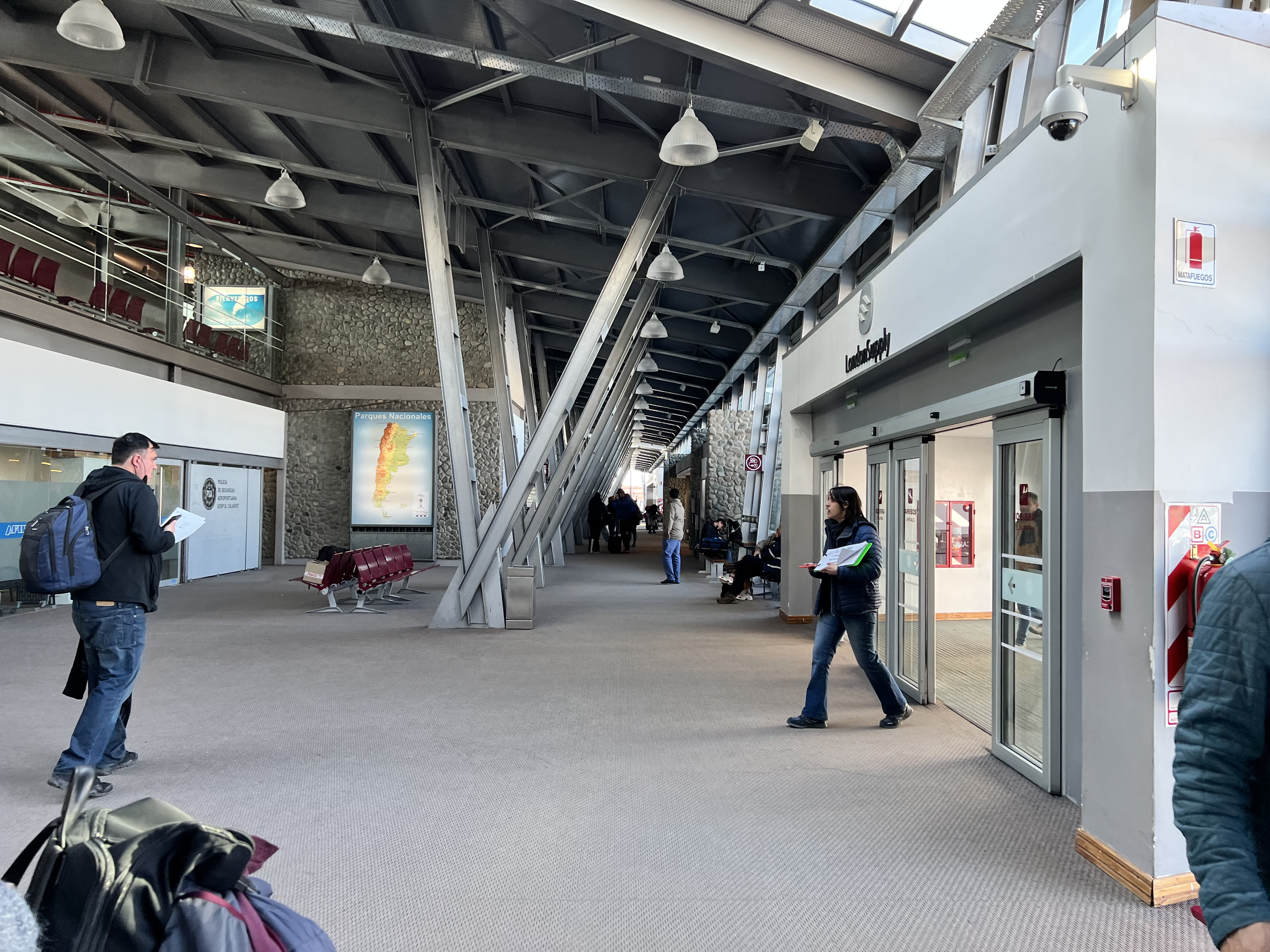

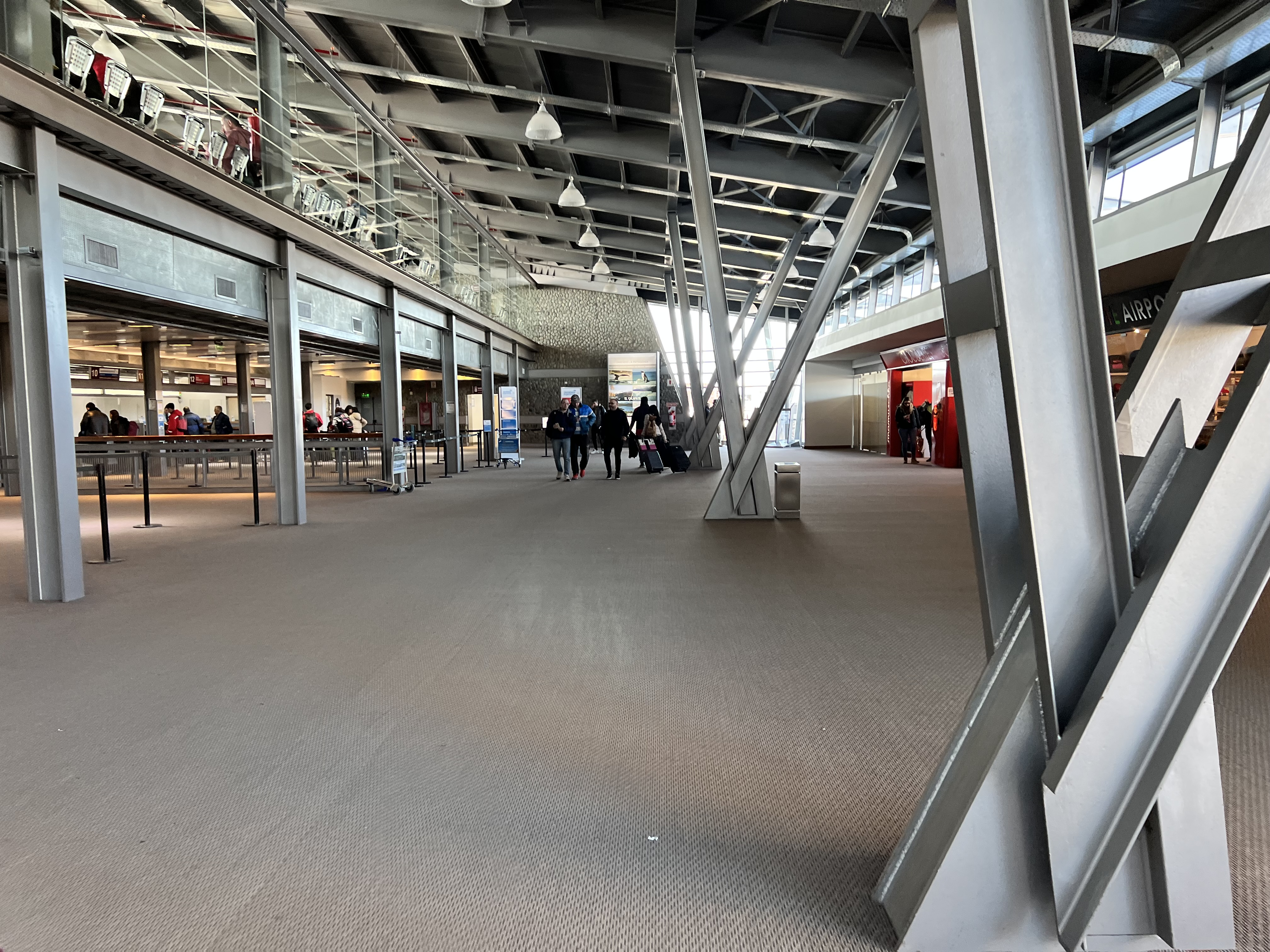

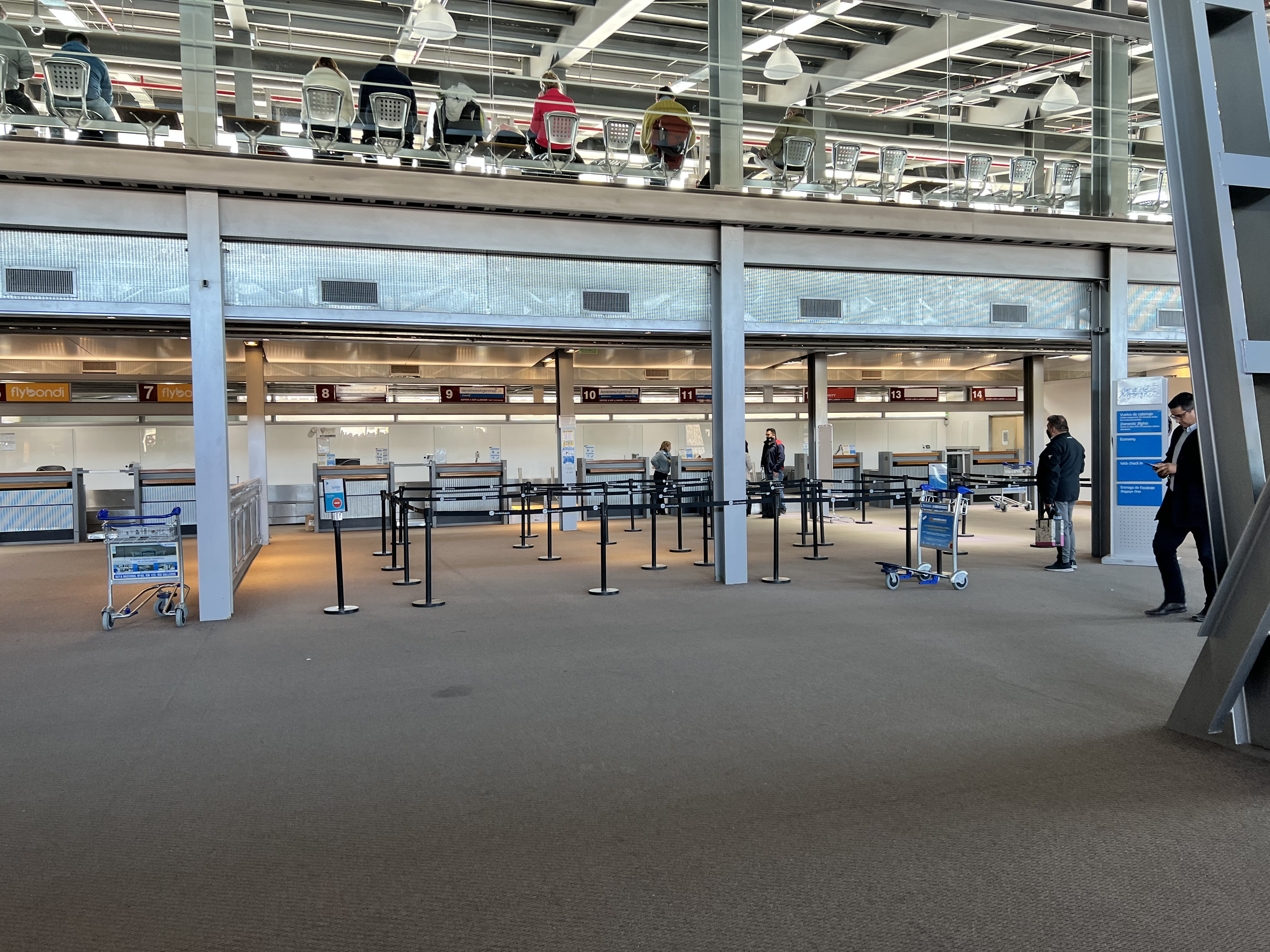

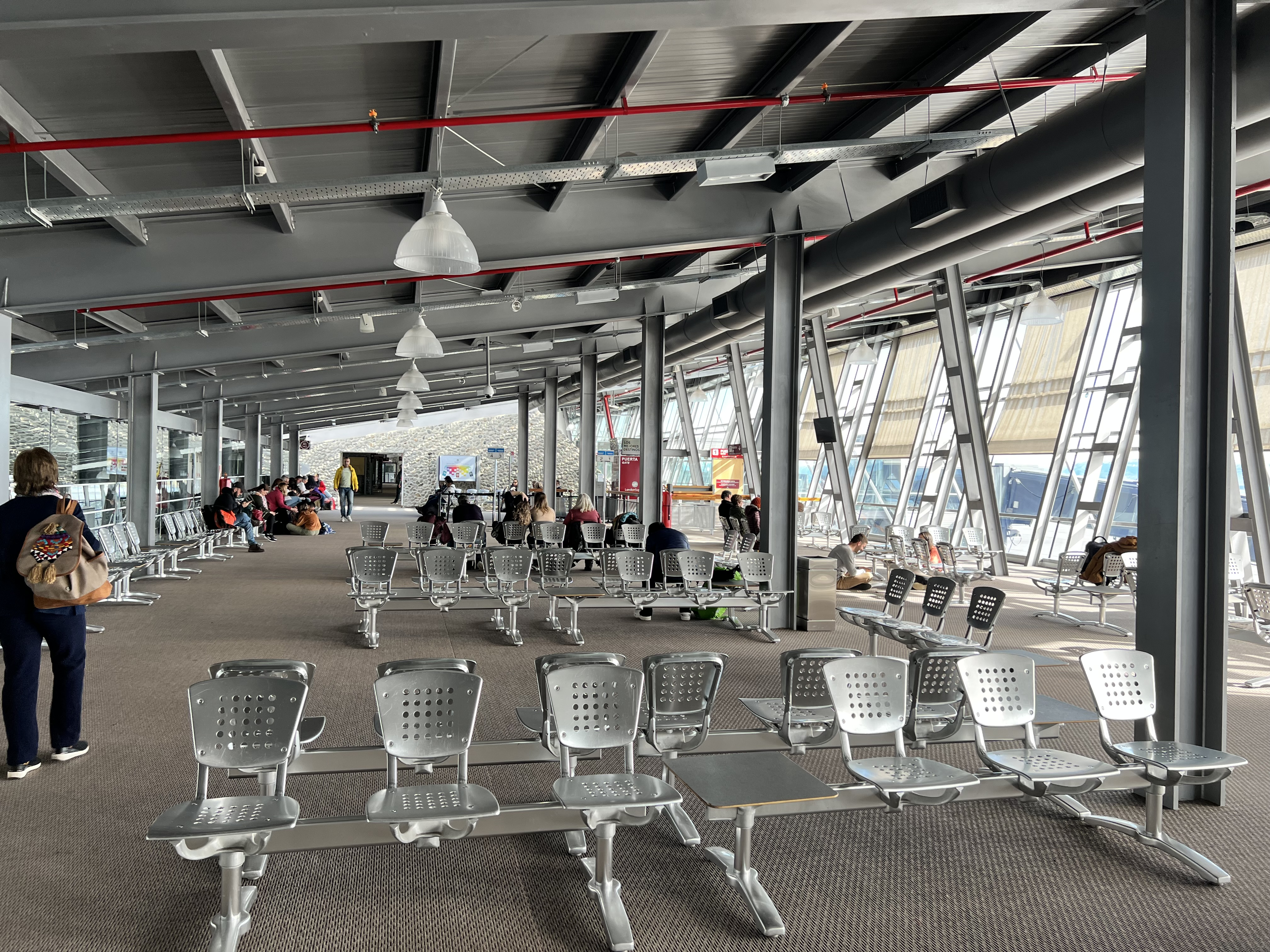

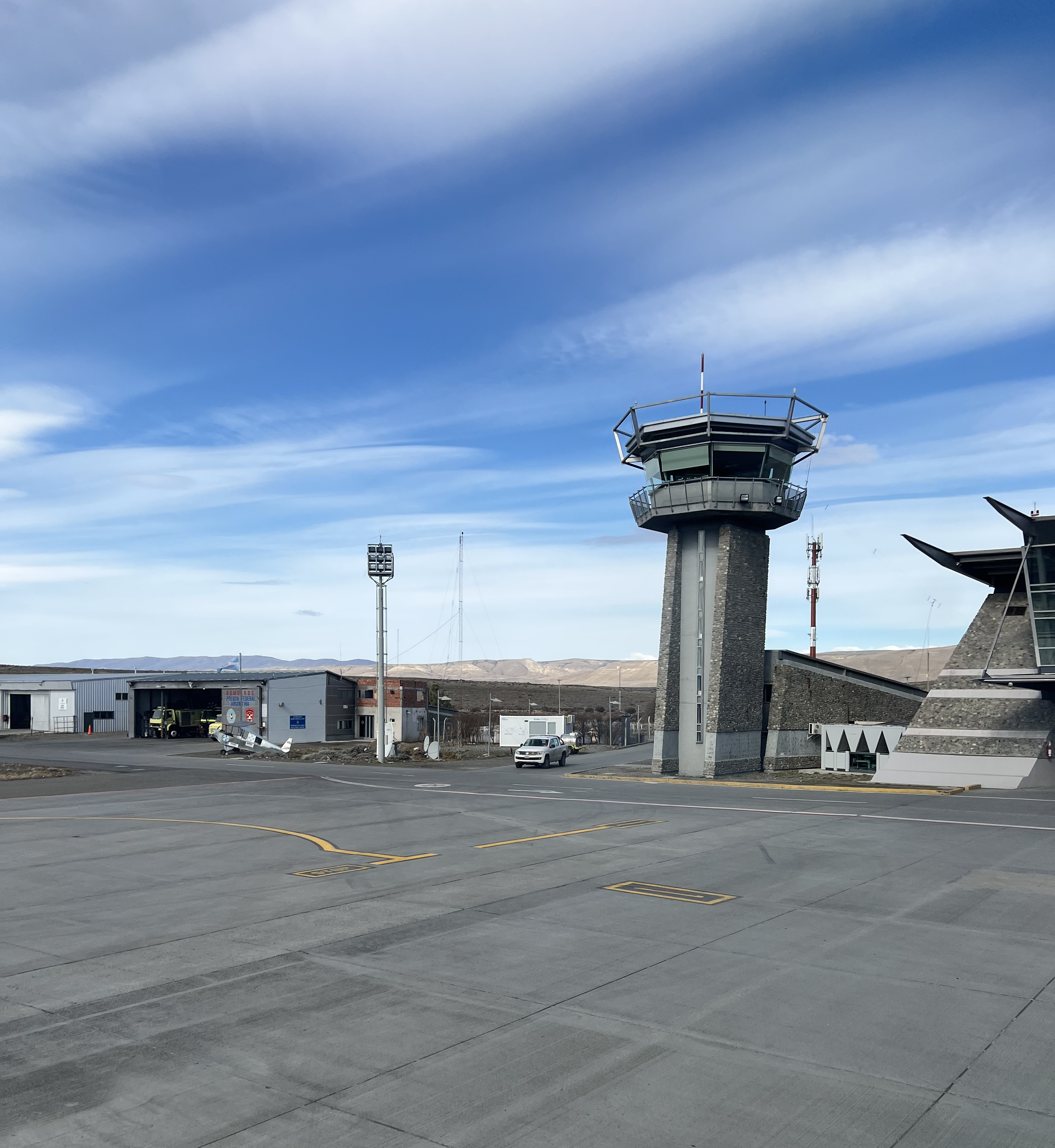

== See also ==
- Transport in Argentina
- List of airports in Argentina
