= Carlos Ott =

Uruguayan-Canadian architect (born 1946)

- Born: October 16, 1946; Montevideo, Uruguay
- Education: University of the Republic, Uruguay; University of Hawaii; Washington University in St. Louis
- Occupation: Architect
- Years active: 1972–present
- Buildings: Opéra Bastille
- Website: carlosott.com

Opéra Bastille, Paris

Carlos Adolfo Ott Buenafama (born October 16, 1946) is a Uruguayan-Canadian architect. He became famous when he won the international design competition in 1983 for the construction of the Opéra Bastille in Paris, which was inaugurated on July 14, 1989 (bicentennial of the French Revolution). Starting from an office in Toronto, Canada, Ott has since expanded his practice internationally. Ott's practice is headquartered in Montevideo, Uruguay, with offices in Dubai, Montreal, Shanghai and Toronto. Ott has designed buildings in Argentina, Canada, China, France, Germany, India, Paraguay, The Philippines, Singapore, Switzerland, United Arab Emirates, the United States, and Uruguay.

== Early life and education ==
Ott was born in Montevideo, Uruguay. His father was an architect. He knew early that he wanted to be an architect. According to Ott, "I have been preparing for this all of my life." Ott was sharpening the pencils at his father's office at age three, and later made coffee for the draughtsmen and learning the basics of draughtsmanship at age five. "I'm one of those lucky fellows who knew what he wanted to do in life, at the age of five."

Ott attended a French-language high school. At 15, he designed a modification used in a production vehicle for GM Uruguay. He was offered a position and training at GM's headquarters in Detroit, but turned it down to pursue architecture. In 1971, Ott graduated from the School of Architecture at the University of the Republic, Uruguay. Shortly after graduation, he received a Fulbright Scholarship and went to study at the University of Hawaii and graduated with a Masters in Architecture and Urban Design from Washington University in St. Louis's School of Architecture (now Sam Fox School of Design & Visual Arts) in 1972.

== Career ==
From 1972 to 1974, Ott worked as an architect for Baldwin & Cheshire Architects in Brunswick, Georgia, and for ARQUECO in San Jose, Costa Rica. In 1975, he moved to Toronto, Canada, working on the Royal Ontario Museum expansion project for Moffat, Moffat Kinoshita & Associates Architects as associate architect. In 1976, Ott became a Canadian citizen. From 1979 until 1983, Ott served Cadillac Fairview Corporation as architect responsible for commercial and multi-purpose projects in Canada.

From 1983 to 1993, he joined NORR Partnership Ltd, located in Toronto, the largest Canadian firm, as partner, heading the Design and Architecture Division. Under his direction, important projects in Canada and the United Arab Emirates were designed and built, including Simcoe Place (Toronto), Mixed Use Complex and Residential/Commercial Development for HE Sheik Tahnoon in Dubai, Union National Bank (Dubai), National Bank of Dubai Headquarters (Dubai, completed 1998) and Union National Bank (Abu Dhabi). A missed opportunity was the Burj Al Arab in Dubai. Ott had submitted a design to the emir's assistant, without signing his drawings. When Ott returned to Dubai three years later, he learned that his contact had been fired and that another firm was proceeding with a modified version of his design. "My building was identical to Burj Al Arab, but a bit taller. The main concepts—building on the water, a sail motif, a restaurant with an aquarium—were my ideas. The experience spoilt my relationship with myself, not with Dubai. When I drive by and look at the building, I say, 'Oh, what an idiot I was.'"

In 1983, Ott won the international design competition for the Opera de la Bastille in Paris, France, to commemorate the 200-year anniversary of the French Revolution on July 14, 1989. Ott was selected from 744 participants as one of the three finalists and then hand-picked by French President François Mitterrand as the winner of this prestigious project. The project gave him international recognition and opened doors to many countries. In order to carry out the supervision of this project, he took a leave of absence from NORR, moved to Paris and formed a team of French architects. The project was very controversial politically, supported by Mitterrand and the French Left, and opposed by the French Right of Jacques Chirac, which caused work stoppages and an extra stage of competition. The project put a personal strain on Ott and his family and Ott and his wife divorced. The building of the Bastille and Ott's involvement is documented in the Canadian documentary film Building The Bastille made for the TVO Network of Ontario, Canada and available on YouTube. It was in this year 1983, that Ott started his own firm in Toronto.

Proposed Pierre Elliot Trudeau Federal Courts Building in Ottawa, Canada. (Left-most building)

Ott returned to Toronto from France in 1989. Ott joined the team designing and building the Canadian Broadcasting Centre project in downtown Toronto. The mixed-use complex contained a new CBC headquarters and broadcast centre, and commercial and retail components and was an important project in the conversion of rail lands and industrial lands. Ott designed the Simcoe Place commercial tower. The project is documented in the book A building goes up: the making of a skyscraper by Mary Gooderham. After his house in Toronto burned down, Ott designed and built his own unique office and house on Lytton Boulevard in Toronto, nicknamed by locals as the 'Hollywood Squares' for its matrix-like design. Ott had to overcome local opposition to its unique design. He continues to use it today when in Toronto.

In 1992, Ott was selected by the Government of Canada to conceptualize a new Federal Courts Building in Ottawa, Canada in the Judicial Quarter. Ten years later, in 2003, it was announced that Ott's design would be constructed as the Pierre Elliot Trudeau Federal Courts Building. The Canadian Prime Minister at the time was Liberal Jean Chretien. It was planned to cost CA$151 million. However, this was cancelled by the subsequently elected Stephen Harper government, to be replaced by a memorial to victims of communism. The site had long been planned for a federal courts building and there was an outcry over the memorial. When the following government headed by Justin Trudeau government was elected, the memorial's site was moved to a different location and the site was re-designated for the Federal Courts building, although no final announcement to recommence the development process was made. The design remains in limbo and the site, estimated in value at CA$16 million, remains vacant.

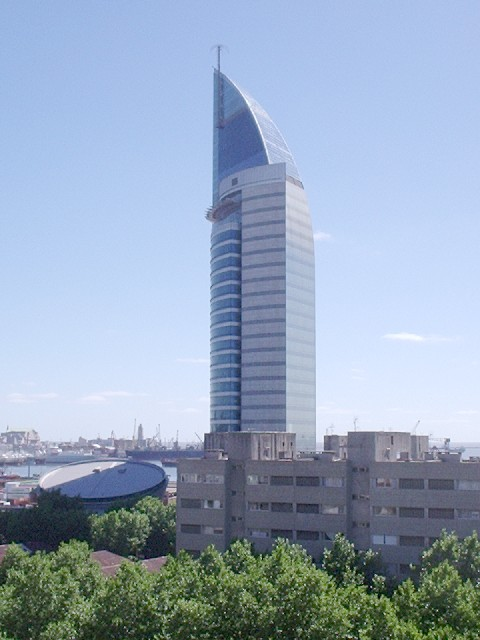
Torre de las Telecomunicaciones (Torre Antel) in Montevideo

After Simcoe Place, the economy of Toronto faced a downturn. Ott's practice in collaboration with other architects expanded internationally. His next accomplishments followed, winning the competition for the Sophien and Hufeland Clinic in Weimar, Germany in 1993, completed in 1998. Ott won several competitions in the United Arab Emirates such as: the Sheikh Zayed Road Development Project (Abu Dhabi), the National Bank of Abu Dhabi Headquarters (Abu Dhabi), Etisalat Telecom & Administration Building (Abu Dhabi), Majid Al Futtaim Project (Dubai), Baniyas Road Development (Dubai), Offices for the Al-Futtaim Group (Dubai), the New Dubai Creek Hilton Hotel (Dubai). In 1993, Carlos Ott won several other competitions in Europe such as the Salle de Spectacles (Espace François-Mitterrand) in Mont-de-Marsan, France and the Thomson Headquarters Building, Offices and Laboratories in Geneva, Switzerland.

In 1992, Ott opened an office in Montevideo, Uruguay, serving South America, and becoming the headquarters of his practice. From this new office, he completed projects such as the International Airport of Laguna del Sauce (Punta del Este, Uruguay); the International Airport of Ushuaia-Malvinas Argentinas (Tierra del Fuego, Argentina); the Punta Shopping Centre (Punta del Este, Uruguay); Torre Antel, the new headquarters for the state-owned telecommunications company ANTEL (Montevideo, Uruguay); the Libertad Plaza Building (Buenos Aires, Argentina); the Comandante Armando Tola International Airport (El Calafate, Provincia de Santa Cruz, Argentina); among others.

Ott has designed several cultural projects in China. In 1997, he was invited to participate in the competition for the Jiang Su Opera House in Nanjing, China where he obtained first prize. As a result, he was invited into another series of very important competitions such as the Beijing Opera House, the Commercial and Residential GW Plaza, and won the contract for the National Grand Theater of Hangzhou, China. He has also designed the Dong Guan Yulan Theatre, the Wenzhou National Theatre and the Henan Art Centre. Ott has an office in Shanghai.

In 2004, Ott designed the Calgary Courts Centre for the Government of Alberta to consolidate court operations in Calgary, Alberta. The building is a massive 1,000,000 square feet (93,000 m^{2}) building of courts and office space. Completed in 2007, it is the largest court facility in Canada.

Some of Ott's current work includes the Atchugarry Museum of Contemporary Art in Maldonado, Uruguay, completed in 2022, and the in-progress Waldorf Astoria Residences in Miami, Florida, and the in-progress Six Fifty 17 condominium tower in Denver, Colorado. The Waldorf Astoria is Miami's first supertall skyscraper. It has 100 floors, its design consisting of nine offset cubes. The bottom three are a hotel, four through eight are residences and cube nine are penthouse units. As described by Ott, "the concept was to make an iconic sculpture that defied the laws of gravity situating the different blocks in different positions, which in addition created unique views from each space".

== Design philosophy ==
Ott is known for his iconic and innovative designs. When asked about The Proscenium project for Rockwell in The Philippines, Ott remarked "If they expect a shoebox building from me, they will be disappointed." According to Ott, creating landmarks is not his primary aim. His aim is to design beautiful buildings that work in harmony with their environment. When asked if The Proscenium would become a Philippine landmark, he replied "Only future generations can tell. A painter cannot judge his own paintings, a writer cannot judge his own book. The role of the artist is to do his work and let the public interpret it. So who am I to say if the building will be iconic? I'll just do the most beautiful building that I can."

== Selected list of projects ==
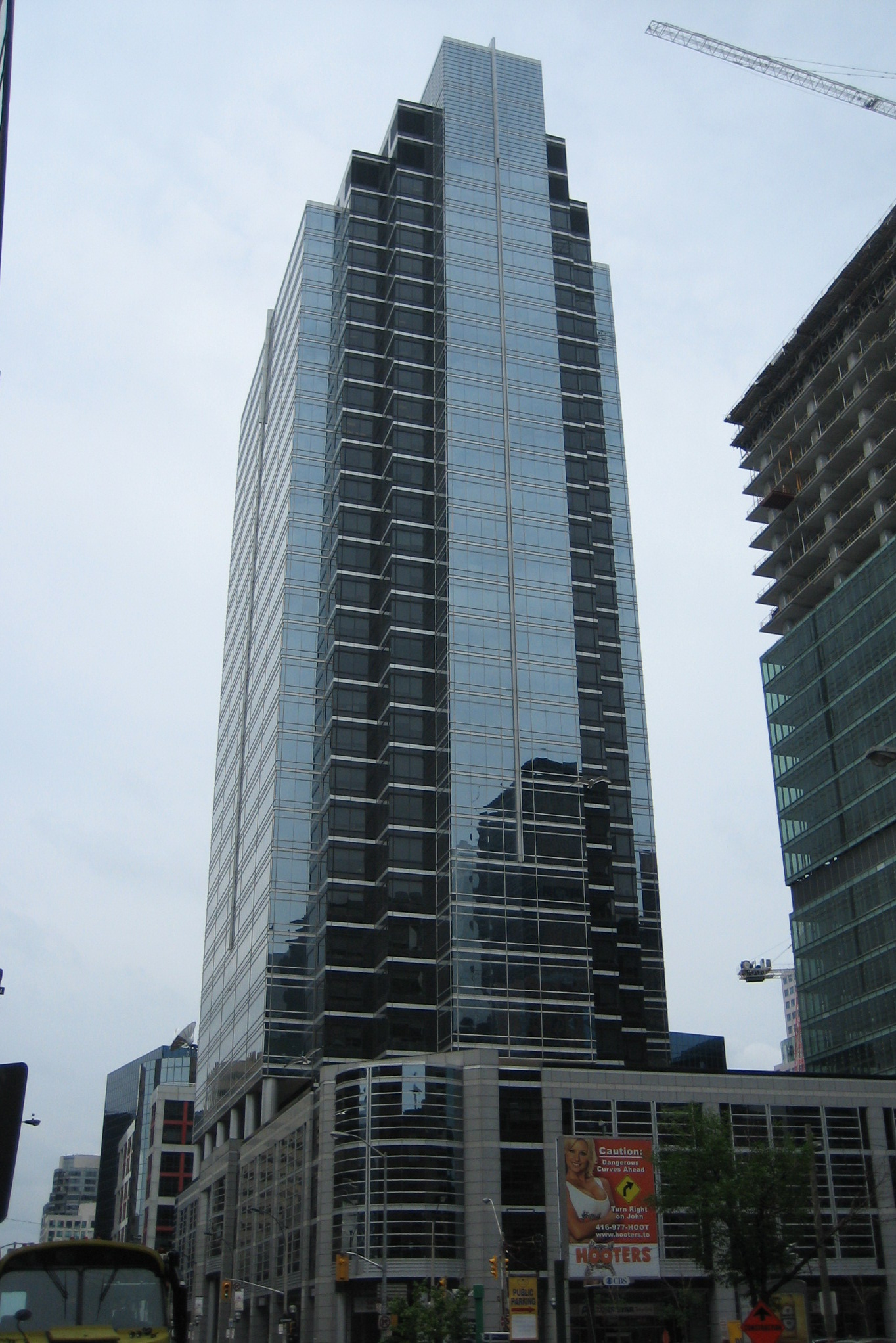
Simcoe Place, Toronto, Canada

- Opéra Bastille - Paris, France (1989)
- Simcoe Place - Toronto, Ontario, Canada (1995)
- Ushuaia – Malvinas Argentinas International Airport - Argentina (1995)
- National Bank of Dubai Headquarters - Dubai, United Arab Emirates (1998)
- Capitán de Corbeta Carlos A. Curbelo International Airport - Punta del Este, Uruguay (1997)
- National Bank of Abu Dhabi Headquarters - Abu Dhabi, United Arab Emirates (2000)
- Edificio Libertad Plaza, Buenos Aires, Argentina (2000)
- Comandante Armando Tola International Airport - El Calafate, Santa Cruz Province, Argentina (2000)
- Torre Antel - Montevideo, Uruguay (2002)
- Hangzhou Grand Theatre - Hangzhou, China (2004)
- Calgary Courts Centre - Calgary, Alberta, Canada (2007)
- Tata Consultancy Services IT Park - Siruseri, Chennai, India (2007)
- Henan Art Centre - Zhengzhou, Henan Province, China (2008)
- Playa Vik resort, Maldonado, Uruguay (2010)
- One Shenton (Tower 1 and 2) - Singapore (2011)
- Hotel Boca - Buenos Aires, Argentina (2012)
- Universidad Argentina de la Empresa -Sede Pinamar
- Echo Aventura - Aventura, Florida, USA (2014)
- Echo Brickell - Miami, Florida, USA (2017)
- Muse Residences - Sunny Isles, Florida, USA (2018)
- The Proscenium at Rockwell - Makati City, Philippines (2019, 2022)
- Jade Park - Asunción, Paraguay (2021)
- Atchugarry Museum of Contemporary Art - Manantiales, Maldonado, Uruguay (2022)
- Waldorf Astoria Residences - Miami, Florida, USA (expected completion 2026)
- Harbour Tower – Buenos Aires, Argentina (expected completion 2026)

== Awards ==
- 1986 - Arts et Lettres and the Legion d´Honneur awarded in 1986 and 1988 respectively by French President François Mitterrand
- 1989 - Award of Merit, Ontario Association of Architects
- 1990 - Gold Medal, Faculty of Architecture in Uruguay
- 1997 - Distinguished Alumni Award, Washington University
- 1997 - Vitruvio Award, Museo de Bellas Artes in Buenos Aires
- 2013 - Doctor Honoris Causa, Universidad Argentina de la Empresa
