= Peter Schwickerath =

German sculptor

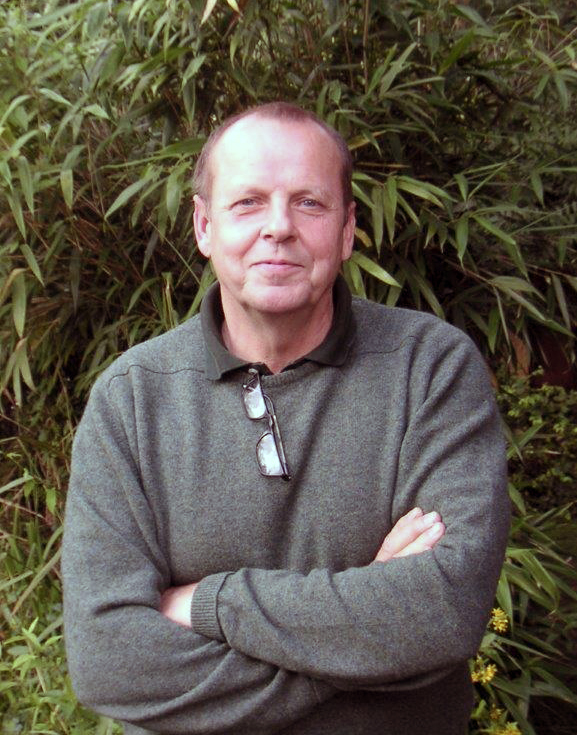
- Peter Schwickerath
- Born: 1942 (age 83–84); Düsseldorf, Germany
- Occupation: Sculptor
- Website: https://www.peterschwickerath.de/

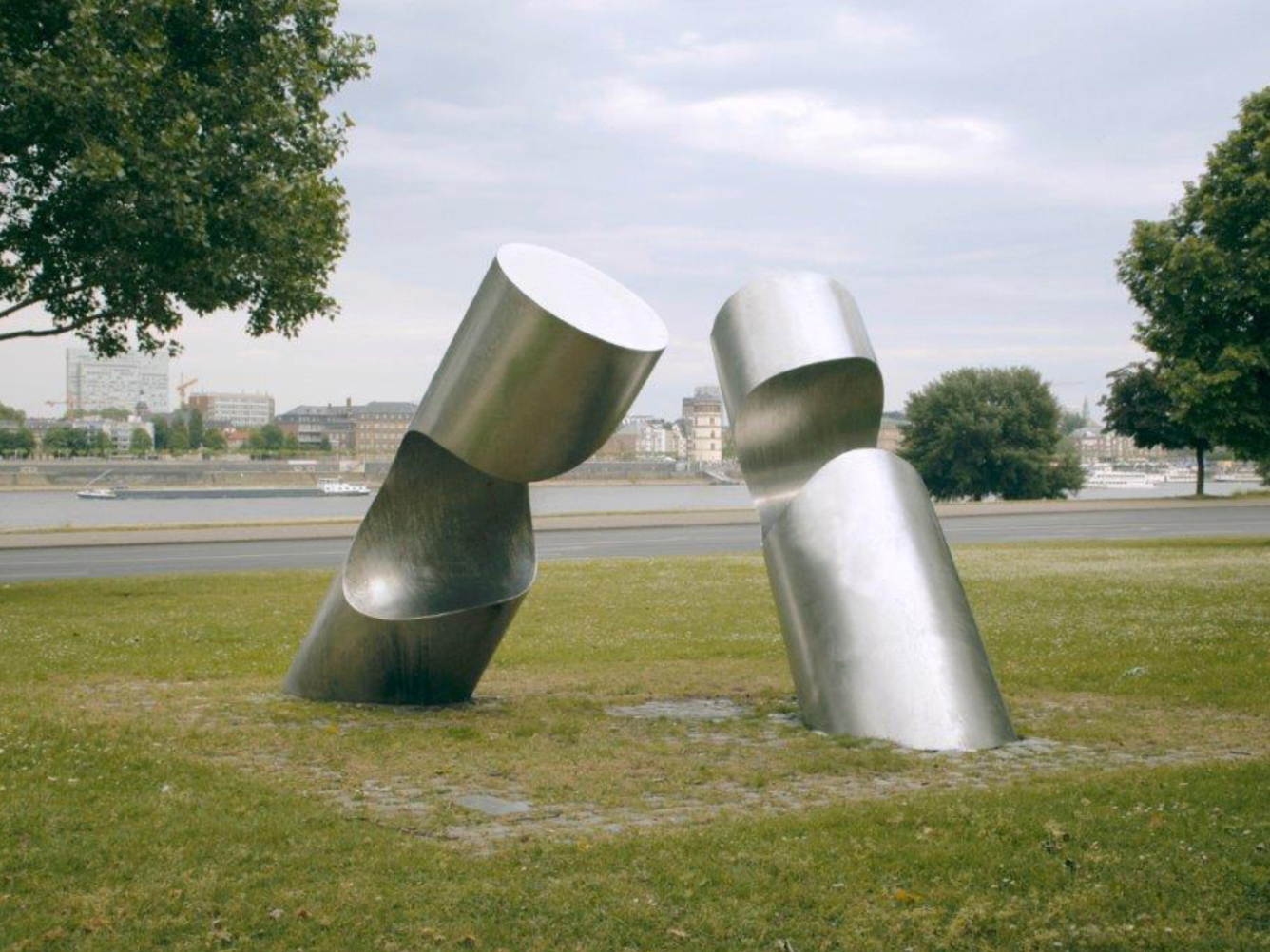
Penetration 1978, stainless steel 3,00 x 3,00 x 3,00 m, Düsseldorf-Oberkassel

Peter Schwickerath (born 1942 in Düsseldorf) is a German sculptor.

== Biography ==
Born in 1942 in Düsseldorf, Peter Schwickerath studied from 1964 in the sculptor class of Adolf Wamper at the Folkwang University of the Arts in Essen. 1965 he became assistant to the sculptor Curt Beckmann. 1966 changed Schwickerath at the Kunstakademie Düsseldorf, where he studied sculpture under Manfred Sieler and Norbert Kricke.

Since 1968 Peter Schwickerath is self-employed as a freelance sculptor with his own studio.

1988 on the occasion of the 700th anniversary of Düsseldorf, he was organizer of the ″Kunstachse – Skulptur D-88″, in which more than 40 objects were placed between the old town and the main courtyard. Some of them remained in place.

1981-1982 idea and organization of: ″Das ambulante Museum I + II″, the Stinnes AG, Mülheim an der Ruhr.

Peter Schwickerath lives and works in Düsseldorf, Germany and Punta del Este, Uruguay.

== Work ==
The ratio of mass and space, volume and space and the effect of surface directions in space, is the subject of his work. The surface of the body as a boundary, the line for coinciding body surfaces, as well as the color and structure of the material are the means. Peter Schwickerath preferably clearly defined shapes for his metal sculptures, such as the square pillar and the cylinder. These have, in their different arrangement and the interplay of mass and volume, display the destination, spatial relationships and to make recognizable. Schwickerath's special interest is the variety of ways in formal simplicity and austerity .

Numerous large sculptures are in public space, in sculpture parks at home and abroad, as well to private collections.

== Gallery ==
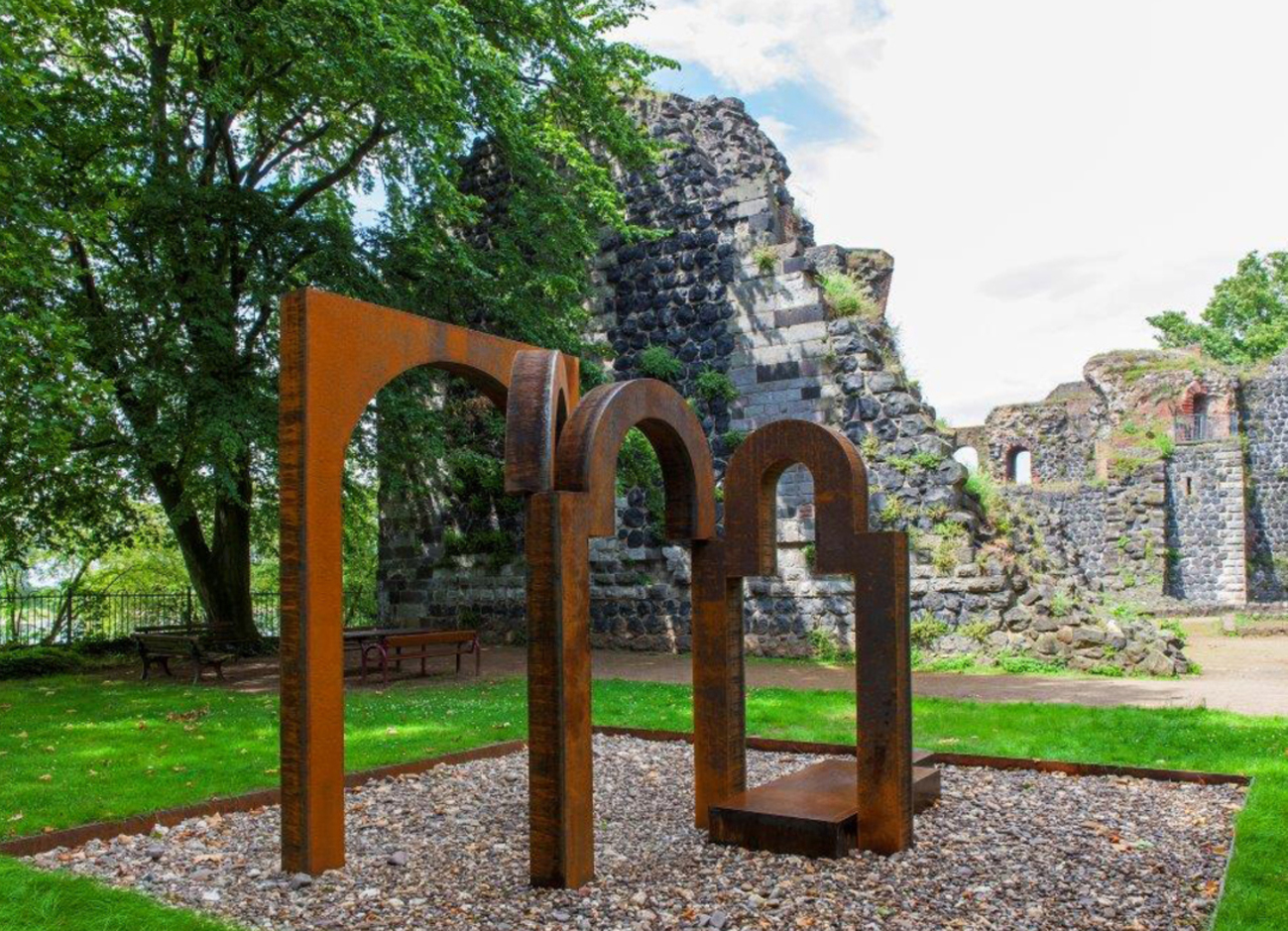
In Context 2014, Imperial Palace Düsseldorf-Kaiserswerth

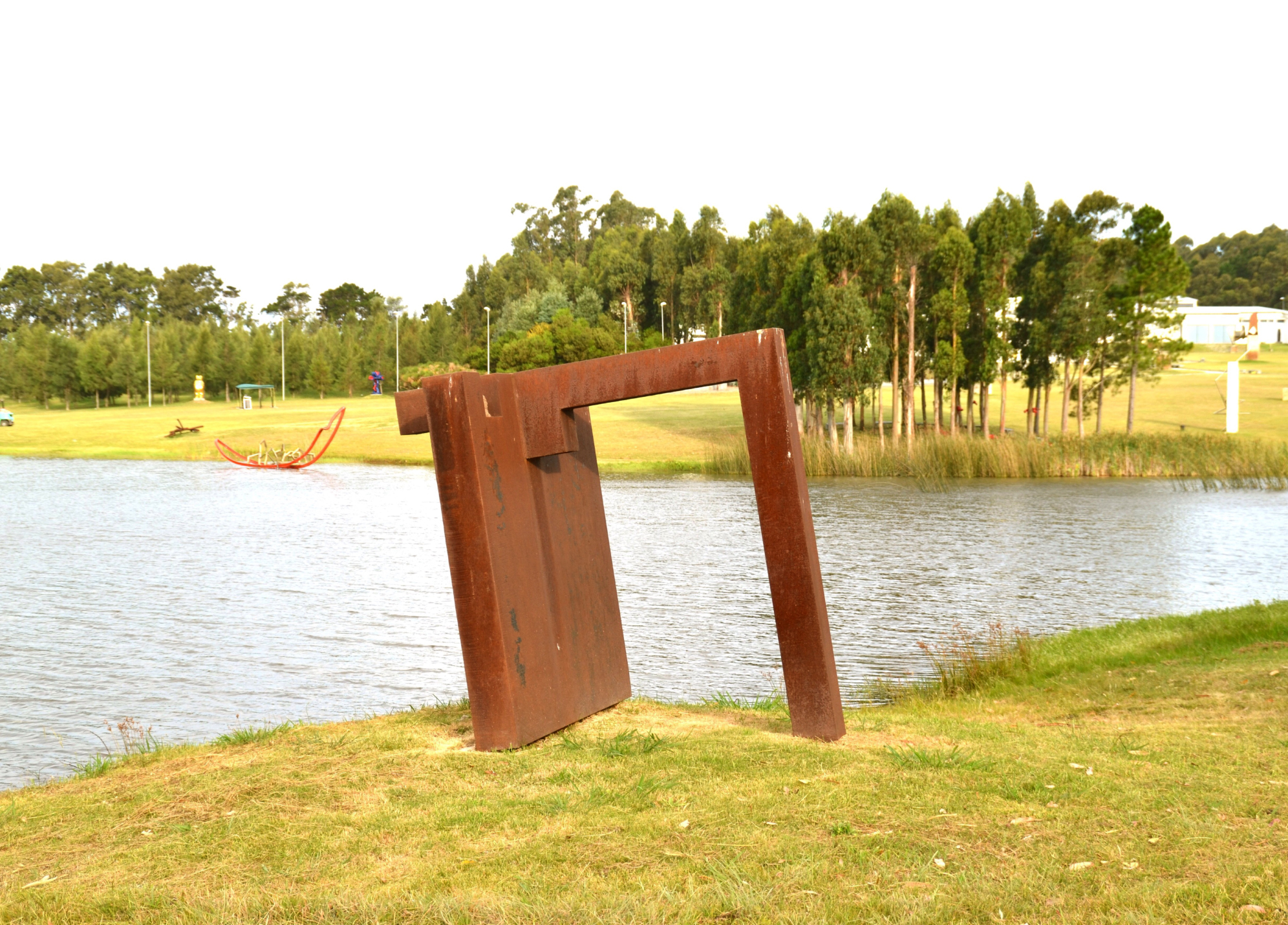
Sculpture Steel IX 96, Fundacion Pablo Atchugarry, Punta del Este, Uruguay

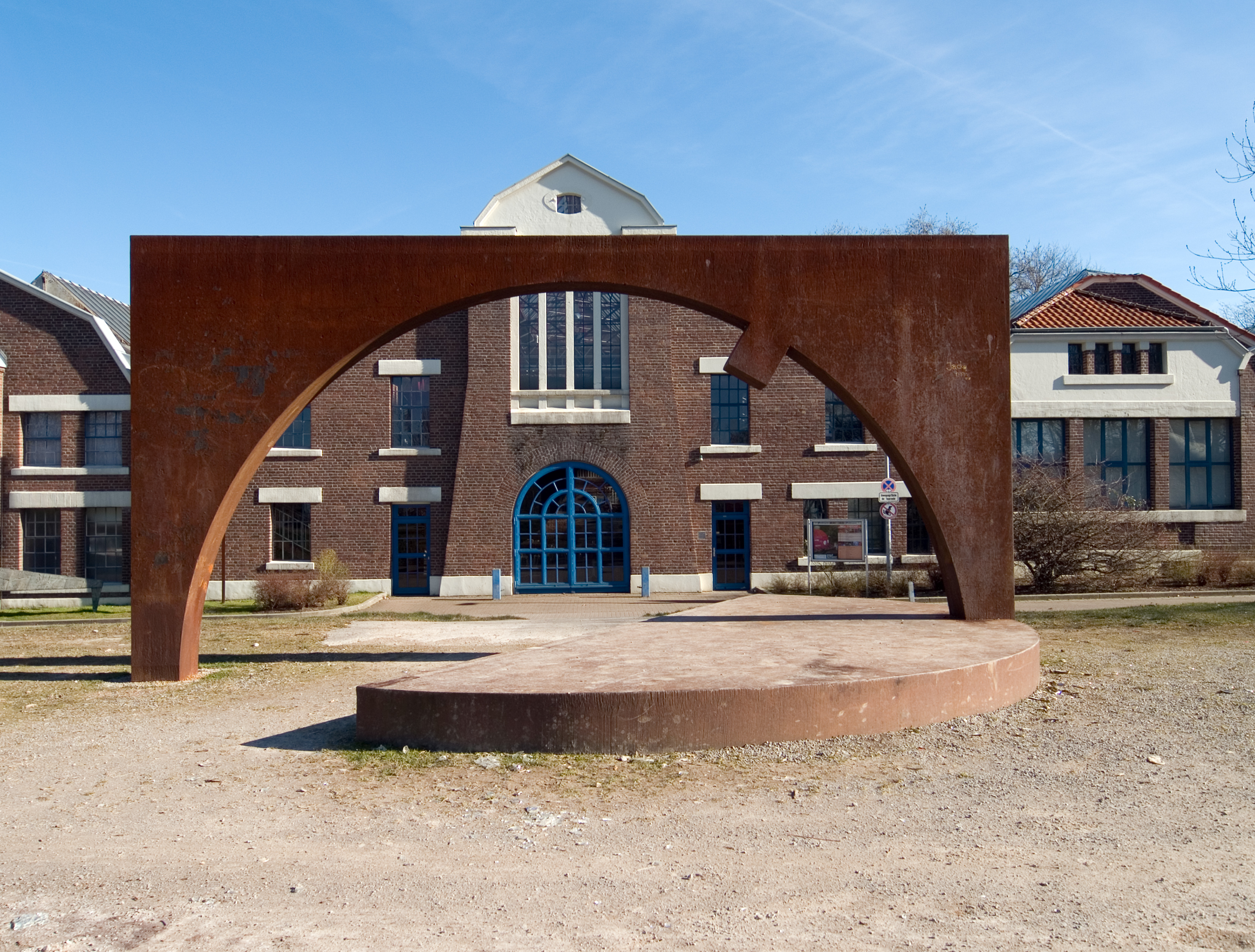
Stahlschnitt 2004, Flottmann-Hallen, Herne

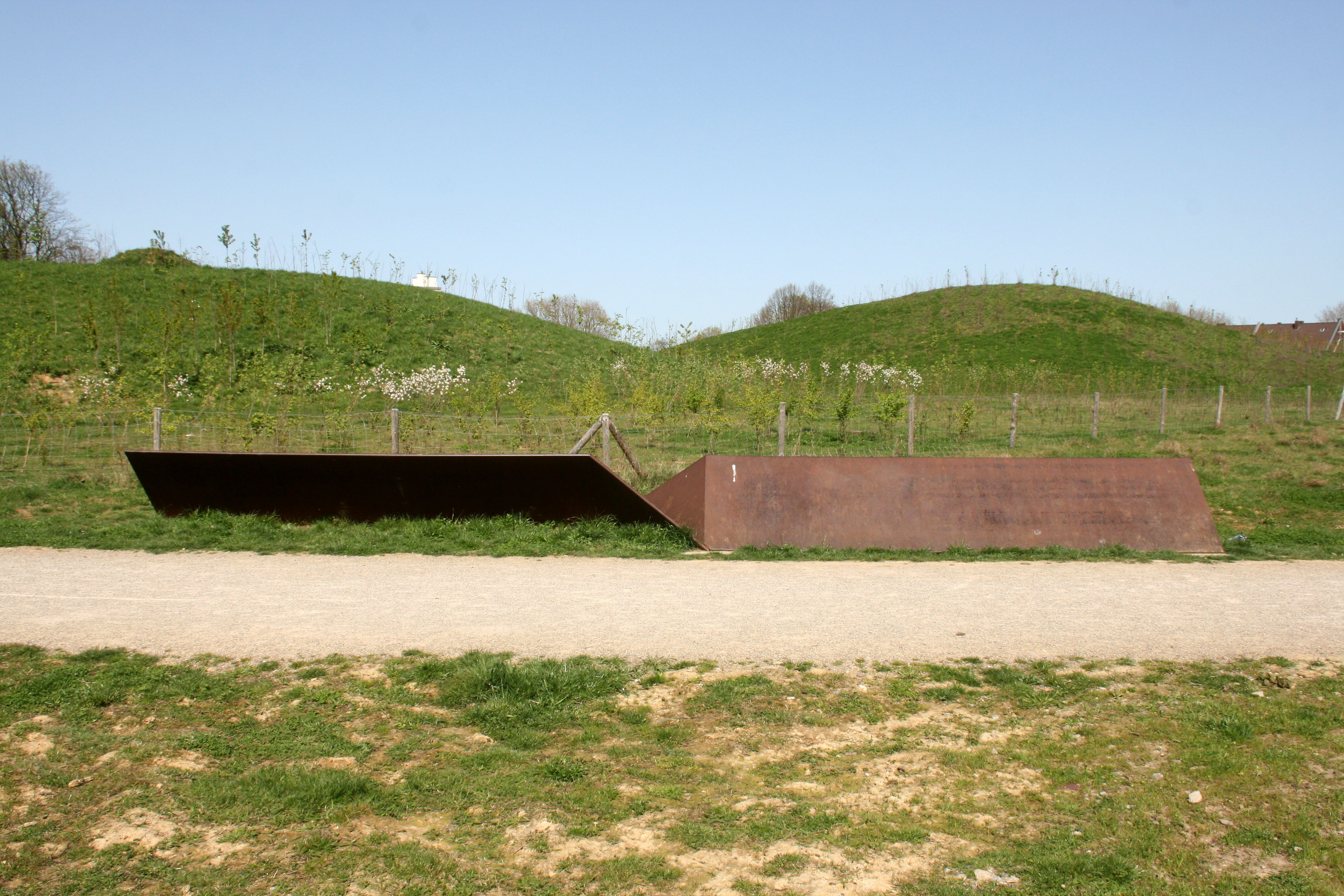
Permeate, Sculpture Park Flottmann, Herne

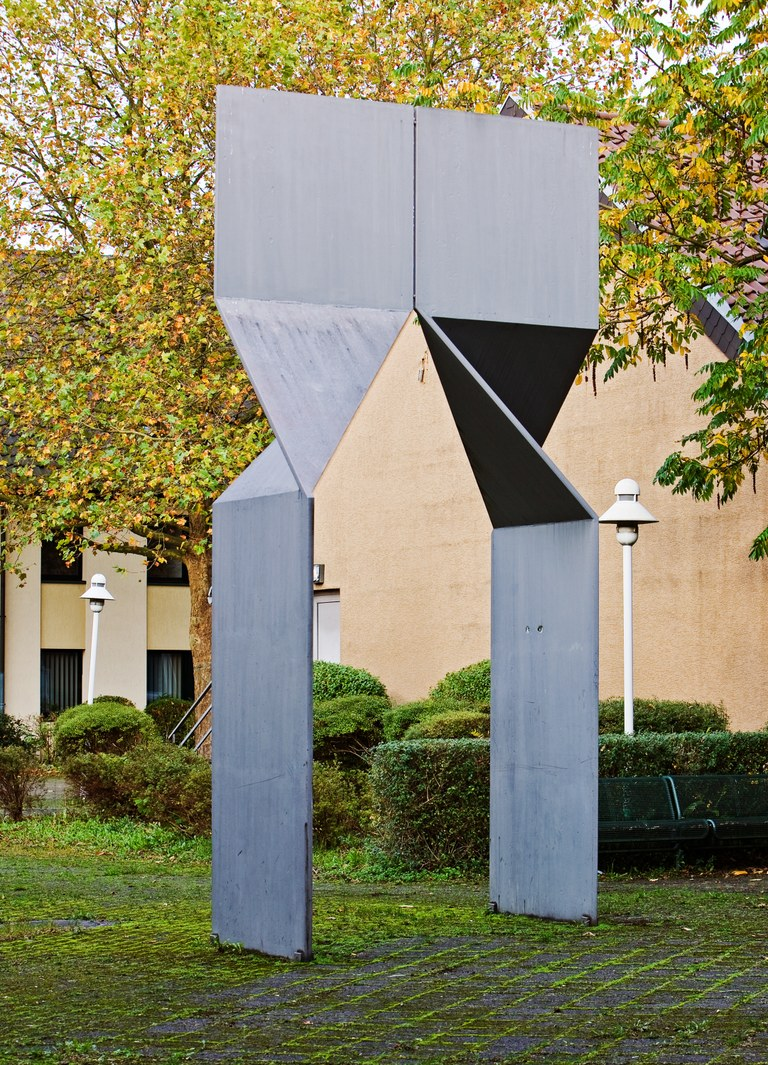
Doppelfaltung 1989, galvanized steel, college campus, Unna

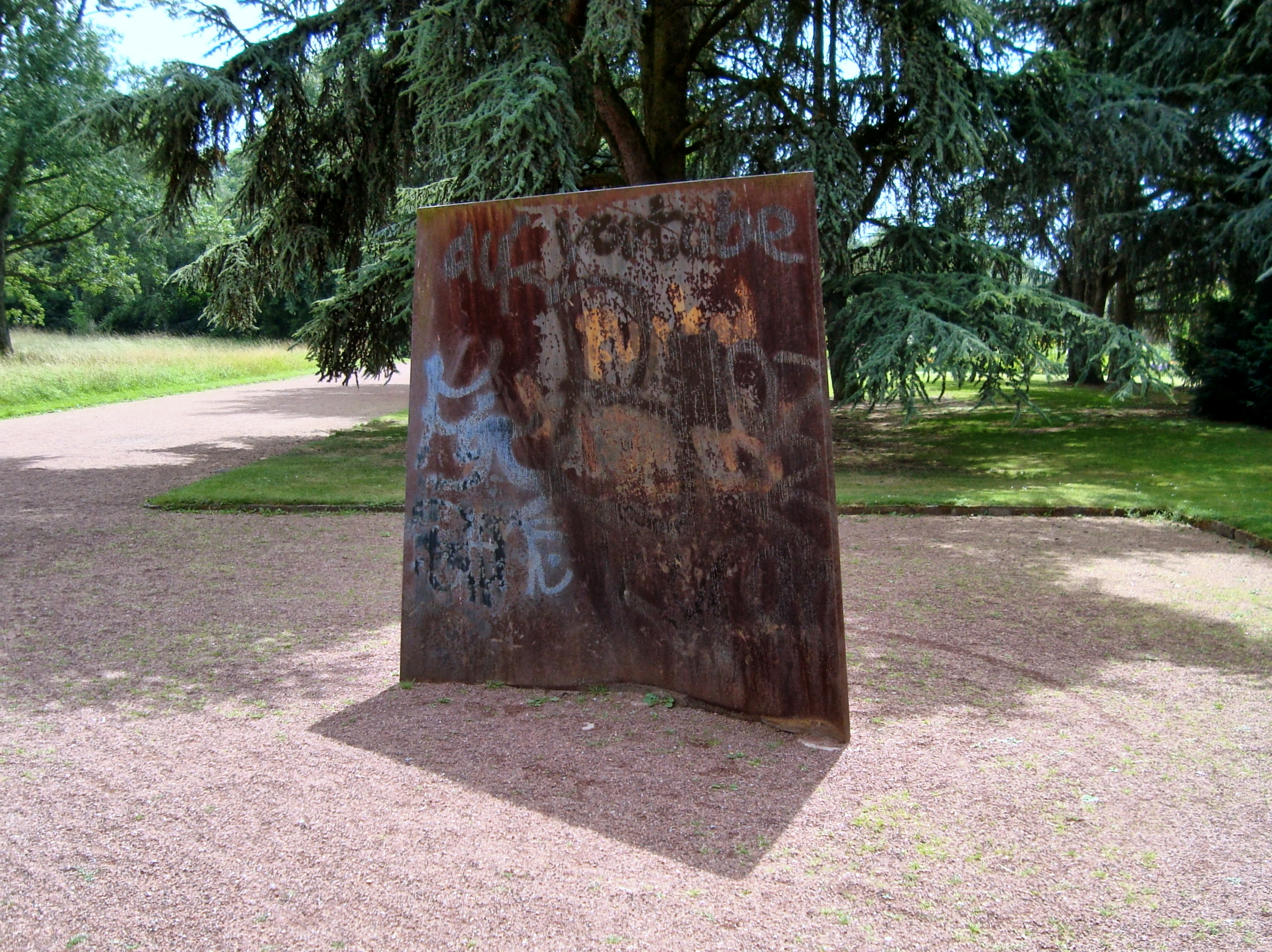
Knickung 1987, Nordpark Düsseldorf-Stockum

== Public sculptures ==
- Düsseldorf: Düsseldorf-Oberkassel, Nordpark, Kaiserpfalz Kaiserswerth
- Blomberg, North Rhine-Westphalia: Amts und Landgericht
- Arnsberg: Regierungspräsidium
- Mülheim: Deutsche Post, Hauptbahnhof Mülheim
- Herne, North Rhine-Westphalia: Skulpturenpark Flottmann-Hallen
- Ahlen: Skulpturenpark Kunstmuseum
- Marl, North Rhine-Westphalia: Skulpturenprojekt
- Lehnin: Oberfinanz-Akademie
- Göppingen: Christophsbad
- Unna: Hochschulcampus
- El Chorro, Uruguay: Fundación Pablo Atchugarry
- Punta del Este: La Concentida

== Exhibitions ==
- 1967: Modehaus Heinemann, Düsseldorf
- 1968: Winterausstellung, Museum Kunstpalast, Düsseldorf
- 1969: Plastiken und Grafiken, Altes Kino Düsseldorf-Lohausen
- 1970: Skulptur, Knoll International, Düsseldorf
- 1972: Winterausstellung Museum Kunstpalast, Düsseldorf
- 1973: Forum Junger Kunst, Kunsthalle Recklinghausen
- 1974: Kunst in der Stadt, Stadthalle Solingen
- 1975: Nachbarschaft, Kunsthalle Düsseldorf
- 1977: 50 Künstler aus NRW, Cultureel Centrum, Venlo
- 1977: Grands et Jeunes du aujourd’hui, Grand Palais, Paris
- 1977: Das Revier als Faszination?, Schloss Oberhausen
- 1978: Drei Bildhauer in der Villa Engelhardt, Düsseldorf
- 1978: 100 deutsche Künstler, Krakau, Polen
- 1981: Skulptur Drei mal Drei, Stadtmuseum Landeshauptstadt Düsseldorf
- 1982: Vier Düsseldorfer Bildhauer, Skulpturenmuseum Glaskasten, Marl
- 1983: Plastiken, Stadtgalerie Altena
- 1984: 80 von 400 Künstlern in der Mathildenhöhe, Darmstadt
- 1985: Art 16' 85, Basel
- 1986: Plastiken Thyssengas, Duisburg
- 1986: Vebiskus Kunstverein, Schaffhausen
- 1987: Westdeutscher Künstlerbund, Hagen
- 1988: Kunstverein und Städtisches Museum, Wesel
- 1988: Galerie Art and be, München
- 1990: Schwarz konkret, Städtische Galerie, Lüdenscheid
- 1991: Plastiken 91 Xylon, Museum Schwetzingen
- 1992: Skulptur und Grafik, Kunstverein, Schwelm
- 1993: Skulptur und Grafik, Galerie Fochem, Krefeld
- 1994: Westdeutscher Künstlerbund, Kunsthalle Recklinghausen
- 1996: Skulptur und Zeichnung, Kunstmuseum Ahlen
- 1996: Skulptur und Zeichnung, Städtische Galerie Lüdenscheid
- 2000: Galerie am Eichholz, Murnau
- 2001: Galerie Fochem, Krefeld
- 2001: Westdeutscher Künstlerbund, Museum Bochum
- 2002: Perspektiven II, Galerie Meißner, Hamburg
- 2003: Egon Zehnder International, Hamburg
- 2004: Stahlskulptur aussen, Flottmann-Hallen, Herne
- 2004: FERRUM, Zeche Unser Fritz, Herne
- 2005: Galerie Fochem, Krefeld
- 2005: Galerie am Eichholz, Murnau
- 2006: 3. Schweizerische Trienale der Skulptur, Bad Ragaz
- 2007: Städtisches Museum, Kalkar
- 2007: Leicht und schwer, Galerie Feder, Murnau
- 2009: 4. Schweizerische Trienale der Skulptur, Bad Ragaz
- 2010: Große Düsseldorfer Kunstausstellung
- 2010: Landpartie, Westdeutscher Künstlerbund
- 2010: Skulpturenpark, Flottmann–Hallen, Herne
- 2011: Galerie Fochem, Krefeld
- 2011: Blickachsen 8, Bad Homburg
- 2011: Galerie 15a, Lochem, Niederlande
- 2011: Stahlzentrum, Düsseldorf
- 2011: Grosse Düsseldorfer, Düsseldorf
- 2011: Metall konkret, Galerie St. Johann, Saarbrücken
- 2012: Galerie 15a, Lochem, Niederlande
- 2013: Galerie 15a, Lochem, Niederlande
- 2014: Kunstverein Onomato, Düsseldorf
- 2014: Stahlplastik in Deutschland - gestern und heute, Kunstverein Wilhelmshöhe, Ettlingen
- 2015: Flottmann–Hallen, Herne
- 2015: Galerie Fochem, Krefeld
- 2016: Juego de Austeras Formas en Acero‘, Skulpturenpark Fundación Pablo Atchugarry, Punta del Este, Uruguay
