= Simcoe Place =

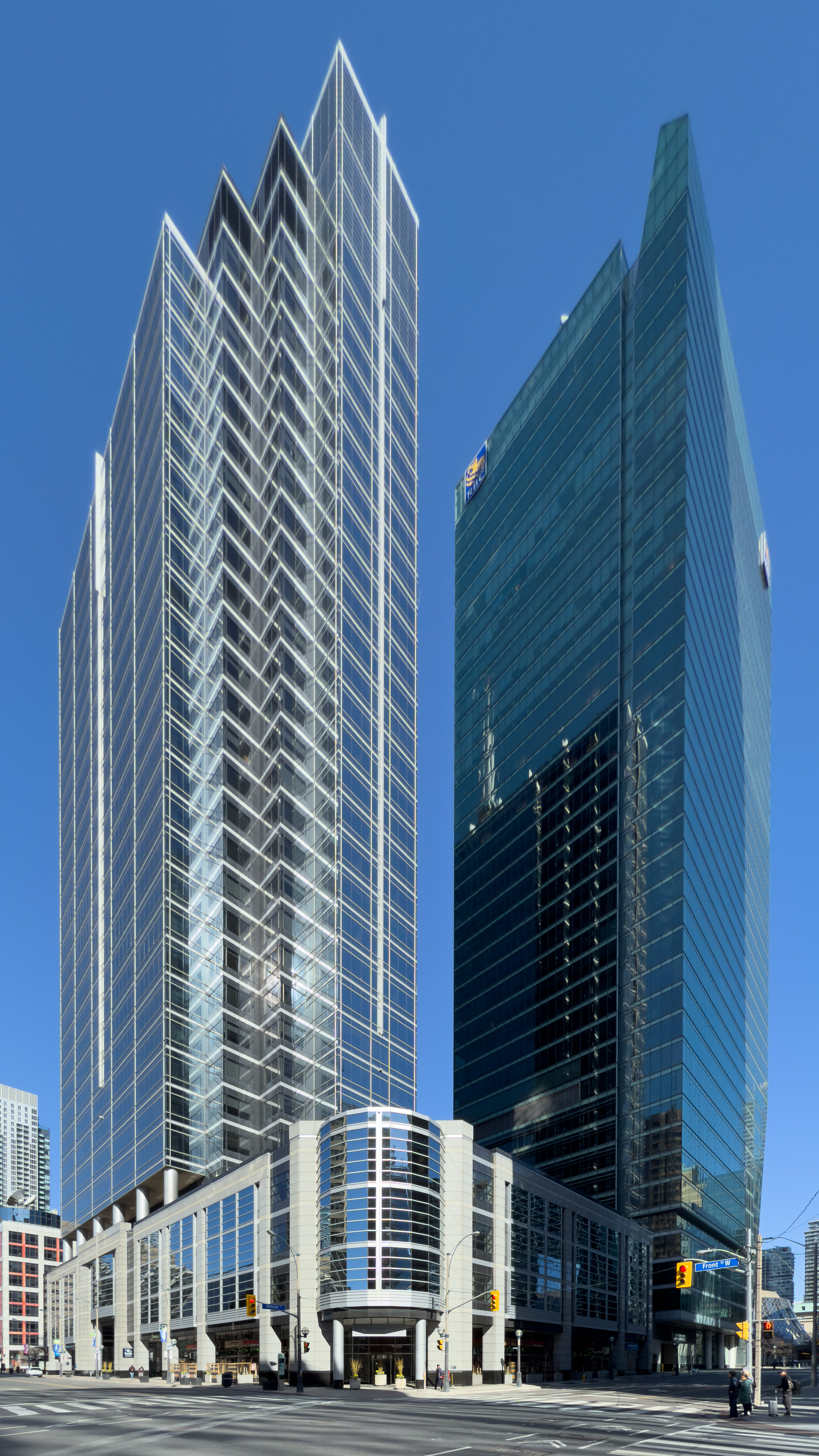
- Interactive map of the Simcoe Place area

General information
- Type: Office, Retail
- Location: 200 Front Street West; Toronto, Ontario, Canada
- Coordinates: 43.644981°N 79.385759°W
- Completed: 1995
- Owner: Cadillac Fairview
- Management: Cadillac Fairview

Height
- Roof: 140 m (460 ft)

Technical details
- Floor count: 33
- Floor area: 69,677 m^{2} (750,000 sq ft)

Design and construction
- Architect: Carlos Ott

Simcoe Place is an office building and shopping centre in Toronto, Ontario, Canada. The tower is 148 metres (486 ft) metres (486 feet) with 33 floors. It was completed by architects Carlos Ott and NORR in 1995. The late-Modernist building was built by developer Cadillac Fairview. It was the only major office tower built in Toronto during the mid-1990s, a period between the early decade real estate bubble and the building boom of the 21st century.

As a special project The Globe and Mail reporter Mary Gooderham spent two years covering the construction, writing 110 columns on the subject. These were later compiled into a book titled A Building Goes Up: The Making of a Skyscraper.

It is the head office for Workplace Safety & Insurance Board. It is adjacent to the CBC National Broadcast Centre and was built as the commercial component of the complex. The design was the subject of a design competition, won by Norr Architects and Ott.

== See also ==
- Canadian Broadcasting Centre
