= Palazzo Isimbardi =

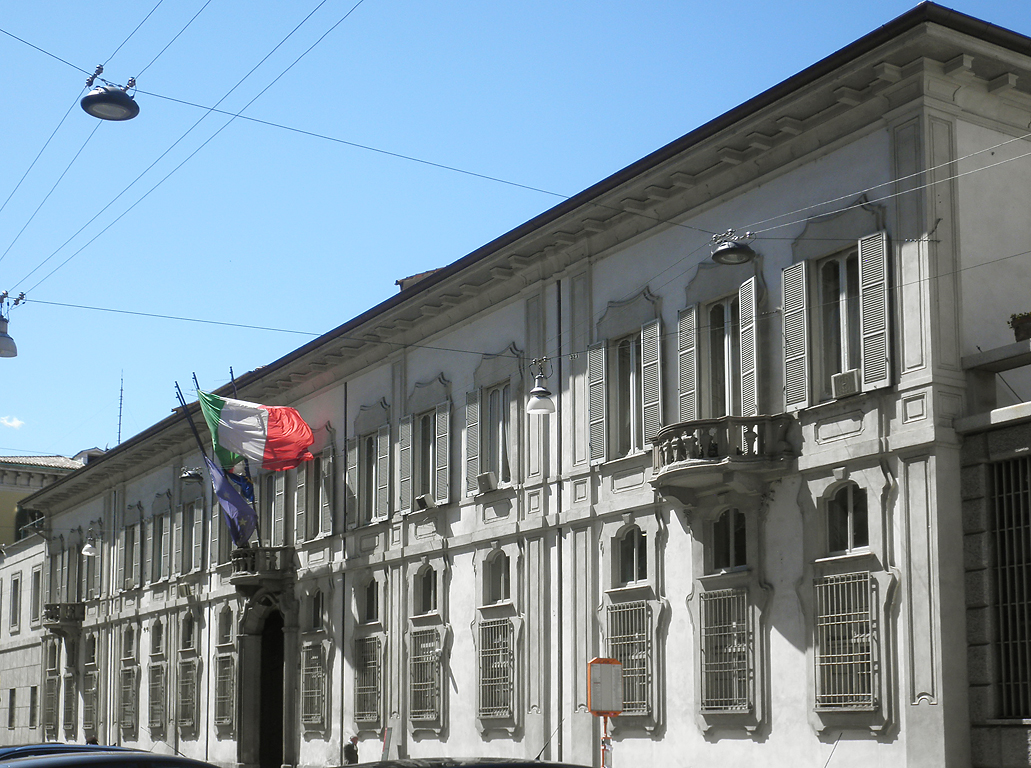
- Façade of Palazzo Isimbardi
- Interactive map of the Palazzo Isimbardi area

General information
- Status: In use
- Type: Palace
- Architectural style: Baroque architecture
- Location: Milan, Italy, 35, via Сorso Monforte
- Coordinates: 45.467532°N 9.201572°E
- Current tenants: seat of the metropolitan city of Milan
- Construction started: 15th–19th centuries

Design and construction
- Architect: Giovanni Muzio (refurbishment)

Palazzo Isimbardi, also called the Palazzo della Provincia, is a historic building in Milan located at 35 Corso Monforte, the seat of the Metropolitan City of Milan.

== History ==
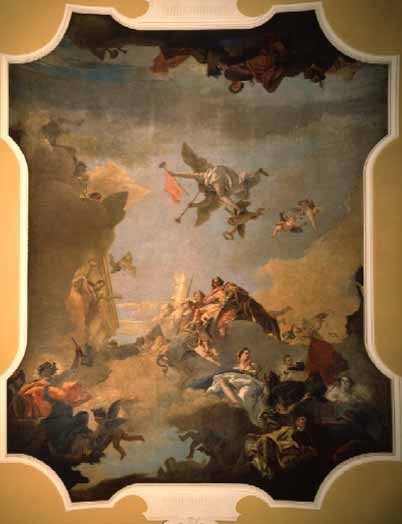
Frescoes by Giambattista Tiepolo in the Council Chamber

Although there are no documents to attest this, the primitive core of the palace is said to have been built in the 15th century as the residence of Cicco Simonetta, councillor of Francesco Sforza. The first document in which the palace is mentioned dates from the late 15th century and testifies to the passage of the palace to a descendant of the owner Gerolamo Pallavicino, to whose family it remained until the mid-16th century, when it was sold to the Taverna family, who used the palace as a suburban residence: during the first decades after its purchase, the palace was much remodelled due to the vast wealth accumulated by the family.

In 1607, hunted down, the nobleman Gian Paolo Osio, lover of the nun of Monza and author of several crimes, took refuge here: he hoped to find hospitality with the Taverna family, who instead treacherously killed him in the basement of the palazzo. When the Taverna family died out through male succession, after a few quick passages the palace was acquired in 1731 by the Lambertenghi family, who, despite only staying there for 50 years, heavily remodelled it, and then sold it to the Isimbardi family, whose name it now bears.

The Isimbardi family also had some restoration work carried out, the main one being the remaking of the façade towards the garden. In 1908, on the death without heirs of Luigi Isimbardi, the palace was sold to the industrialist Franco Tosi, from whom in 1935 the province of Milan purchased it, making it its seat. Later, with the suppression of the province of Milan, it became the seat of the metropolitan city of Milan.

== Description ==
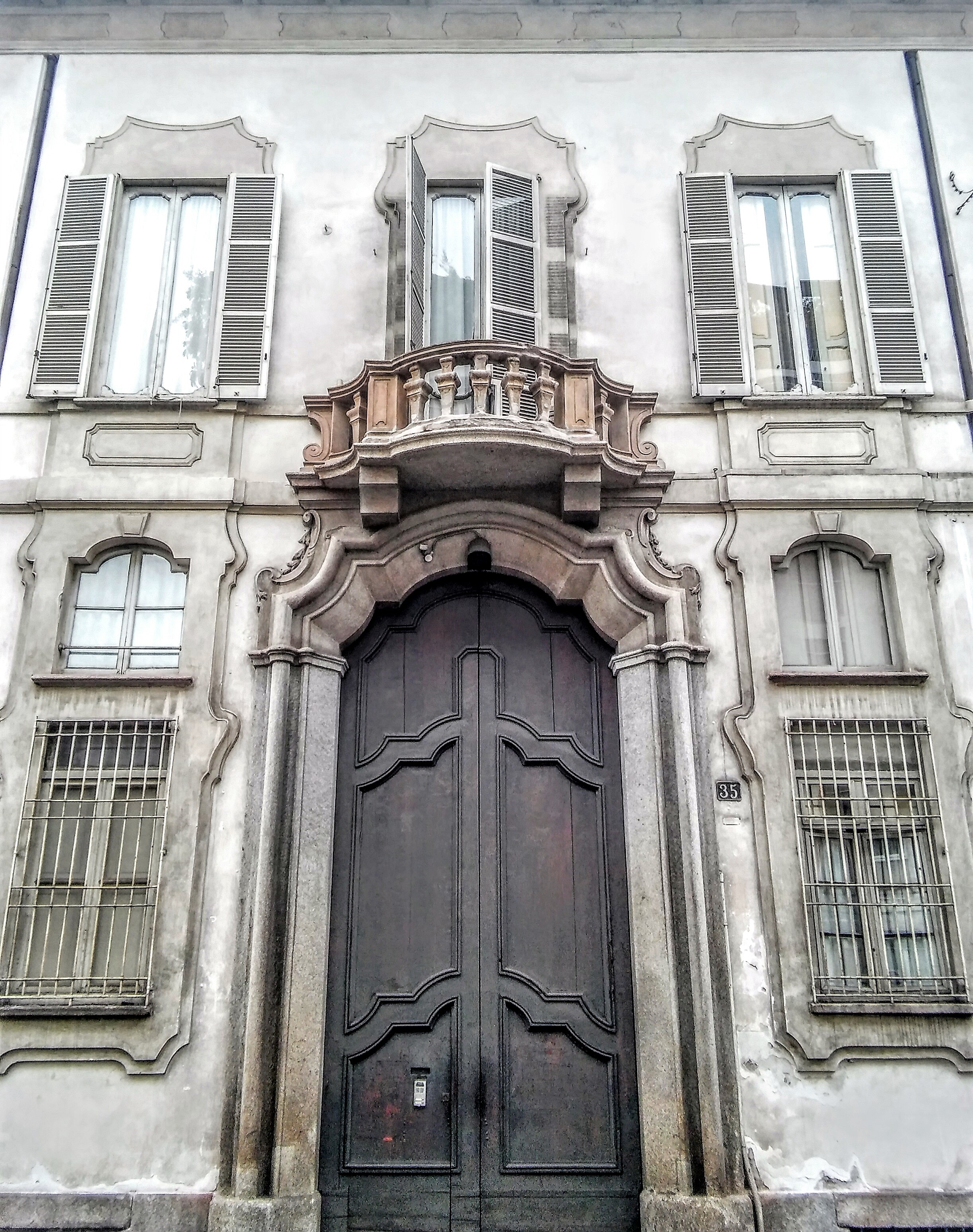
The portal

The façade on the street, dating back to the 18th century, one of the best examples of Lombard baroque in the city, has two floors decorated with fregi and stucco cornices; the stone portal is surmounted by a balcony with richly decorated balusters. The inner courtyard is a square four-sided portico, with columns of Doric order in granite supporting round arches. The vaults of the portico had a typically Renaissance frescoed decoration, which partly re-emerged during restoration and alterations carried out in 1939, when the architect Giovanni Muzio carried out an extension overlooking Via Vivaio. On the garden front, the palace has a neoclassical façade with a rusticated ground floor, with the central body surmounted by a monumental timpanum. The interior decorations are noteworthy, especially those in the Sala degli affreschi with works by Morazzone, in the Sala del consiglio with the fresco of the Apoteosi di Angelo della Vecchia nel segno delle virtù by Giambattista Tiepolo, in another room the Episodio dei Visconti by Francesco Hayez. All'interno sono anche alcune sculture di Ivo Soli (1898–1976).

== See also ==
- Palazzo Spinola (Milano)

== Bibliography ==
=== Italian sources ===
- Lanza, Attilia (1993). Milano e i suoi palazzi: Porta Vercellina, Comasina e Nuova. Libreria Meravigli Editrice.
- Livia Negri (1998). I palazzi di Milano. Newton & Compton Editori.
