= Muse (building) =

Apartment building in Sunny Isles Beach, Florida

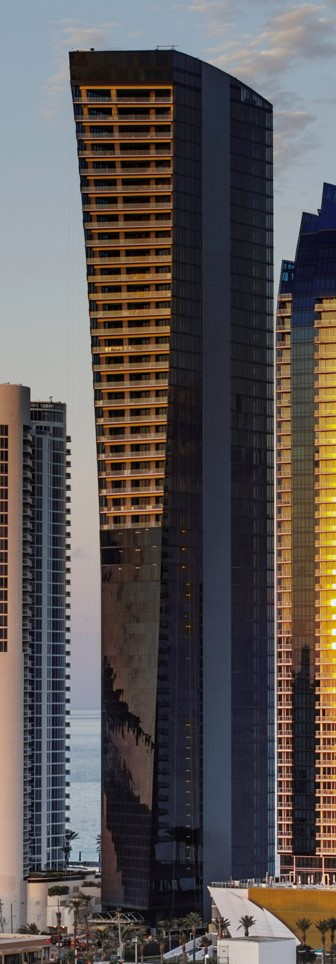
- Muse in March 2018
- Interactive map of the Muse area

General information
- Status: Completed
- Location: 17141 Collins Avenue, Sunny Isles Beach, United States
- Coordinates: 25.93496°N 80.12089°W
- Construction started: 2015
- Completed: 2018

Height
- Height: 649 ft (198 m)

Technical details
- Floor count: 47

Design and construction
- Architect: Carlos Ott
- Developer: Property Markets Group; S2 Development

Website
- www.museresidencesmiami.com

Muse Residences is an apartment building condo development in Sunny Isles Beach, Florida. The 47-story condo building with 68 units was developed by Property Markets Group and S2 Development. Each unit includes a sculpture by Helidon Xhixha. The tall and narrow building was designed by Carlos Ott. The building was built to the maximum permitted height in Sunny Isles Beach at that time of 649 feet (198 m) above sea level. However, in the 2020s several buildings exceed that height, being built up to the new limit of approximately 749 feet (228 m) above sea level. Completed in 2018, it was then the tallest building in Sunny Isles Beach and the tallest building in Florida outside Miami.

== See also ==
- List of tallest buildings in Sunny Isles Beach
