= Almirante Marcos A. Zar Airport =

Almirante Marcos A. Zar Airport Aeropuerto de Trelew
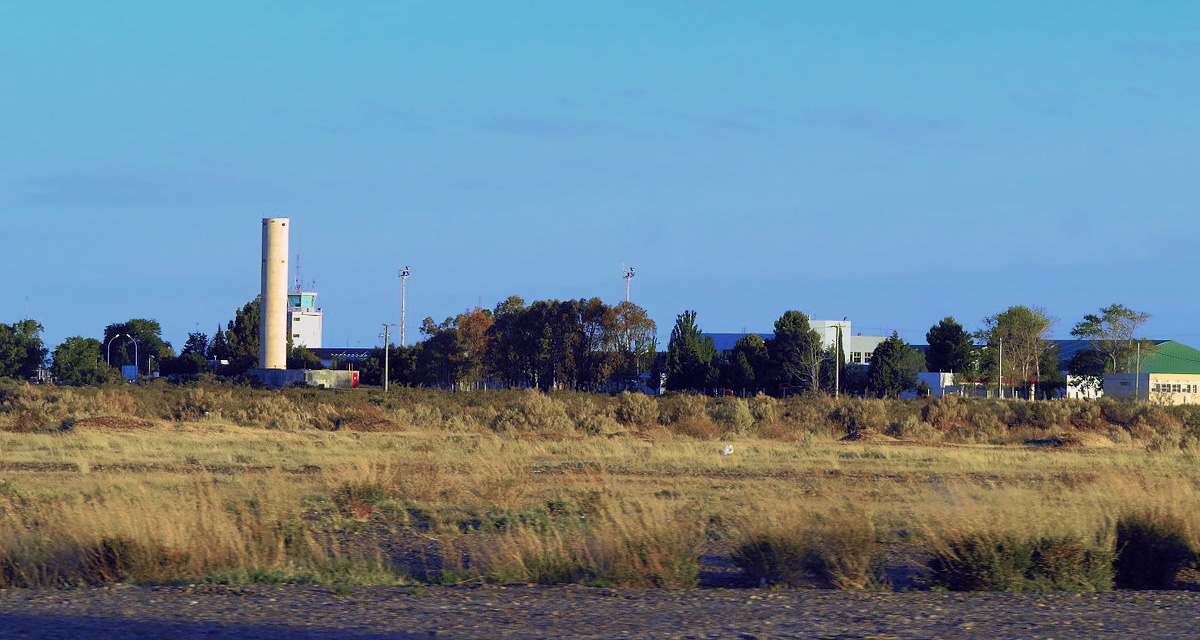
- IATA: REL; ICAO: SAVT

Summary
- Airport type: Public / military
- Owner: Argentine Government
- Operator: London Supply Group
- Serves: Trelew, Argentina
- Elevation AMSL: 141 ft (43 m)
- Coordinates: 43°12′35″S 65°17′00″W
- Website: www.aeropuertotrelew.com/en

Map
- Location of airport in Argentina

Runways
Direction	Length		Surface
Direction	m	ft	Surface
07/25	2,560	8,399	Concrete

Statistics (2016)
- Total passengers: 252,594
- Source: GCM SkyVector Google Maps

Almirante Marcos A. Zar Airport (Welsh: Maes Awyr Almirante Marcos A. Zar, Spanish: Aeropuerto Almirante Marcos A. Zar) (IATA: REL, ICAO: SAVT) is an airport in Trelew, Chubut Province, Argentina, named after the Argentine Navy Admiral and aviator Marcos Andrés Zar. The airport serves the cities of Trelew and Rawson.

The airport is 3 kilometres (2 mi) northeast of Trelew and 17 kilometres (11 mi) from Rawson, the capital of Chubut Province. It has a 3,500 square metres (38,000 sq ft) passenger terminal and has parking for 128 cars. It is operated by London Supply.

The Trelew Almirante Zar Naval Air Base is on the airport, and has an Argentine Naval Aviation squadron flying P-3 Orions.

== History ==
This airport replaced an airport noted as a pivotal site during the Trelew massacre. On August 15, 1972, 110 prisoners escaped from the Rawson jail and tried to hijack an Austral Líneas Aéreas BAC One-Eleven en route to Comodoro Rivadavia, in order to escape to Chile and from there to Cuba. Their plans failed, and 19 of them were killed by the army on August 22, at 3:30 AM..

The airport previously served international flights to Sao Paulo, Brazil. which was operated by Aerolíneas Argentinas in October 2014, but the service was ended following year. leaving the airport without international flights.

== Airlines and destinations ==
Airlines	Destinations
Aerolíneas Argentinas	Buenos Aires–Aeroparque, El Calafate, Ushuaia
JetSmart Argentina	Buenos Aires–Aeroparque, Buenos Aires–Ezeiza

== See also ==
- Transport in Argentina
- List of airports in Argentina
