= Fundacion Pablo Atchugarry =

The Fundacion Pablo Atchugarry is a nonprofit institution created by the Uruguayan artist Pablo Atchugarry in 2007 in Punta del Este, Uruguay.

The institution aims at promoting visual arts, literature, music, dance and other art forms to its community and visitors. The location and design of the space was chosen by the founder to allow a "dialogue between art and nature".

The fundacion is composed of the sculptors workshop, an exhibition building, an auditorium, an open-air stage, a restaurant, a didactic room, as well as a 30-hectare sculpture park.

== Exhibitions ==
- 2016: Peter Schwickerath‚ Juego de Austeras Formas en Acero‘
