= Palazzo Spinola (Milano) =

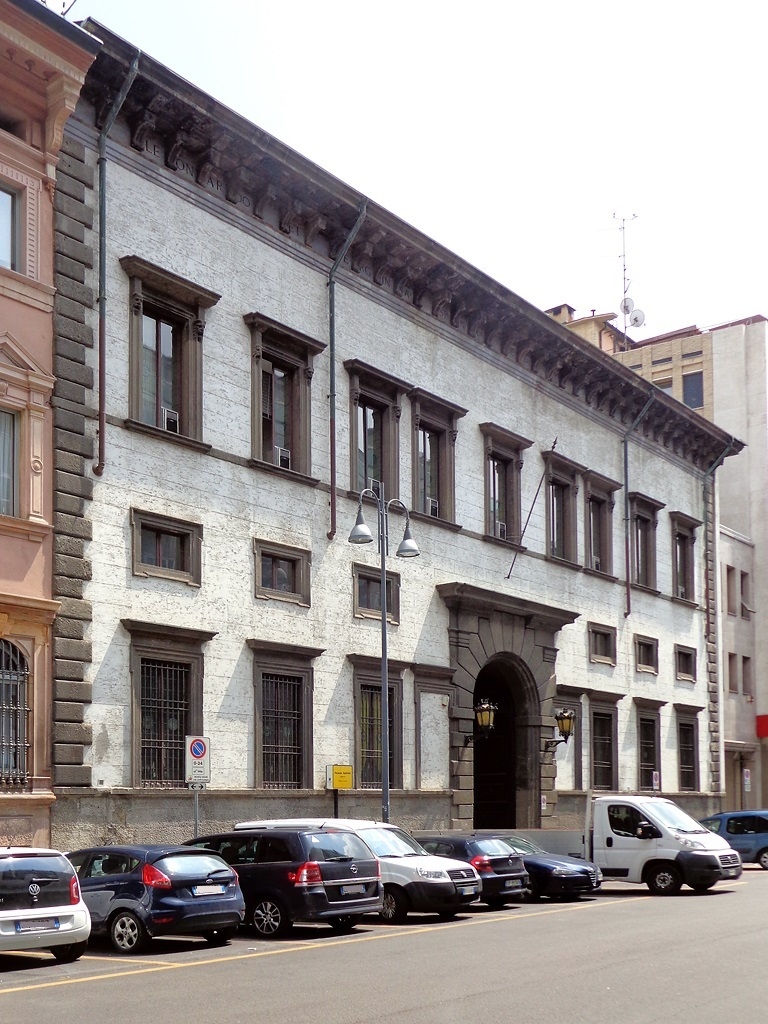
- Interactive map of the Palazzo Spinola (Milano) area

General information
- Status: In use
- Type: Palace
- Architectural style: Renaissance architecture
- Location: Milan, Italy, 10, via San Paolo
- Coordinates: 45.465877°N 9.193788°E
- Construction started: 1570
- Completed: 1615

Design and construction
- Architect: Giuseppe Meda

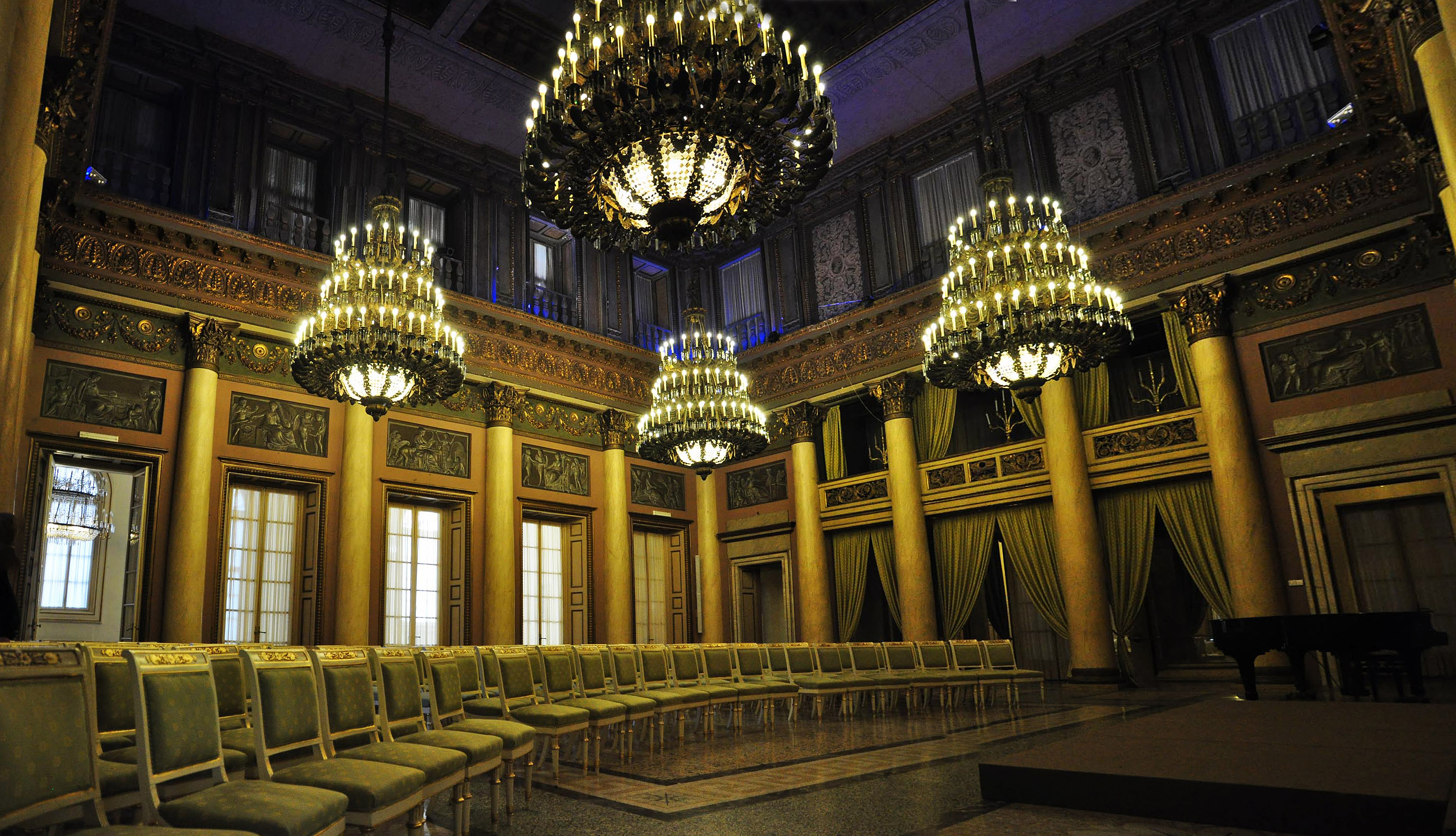
The sala d'gold

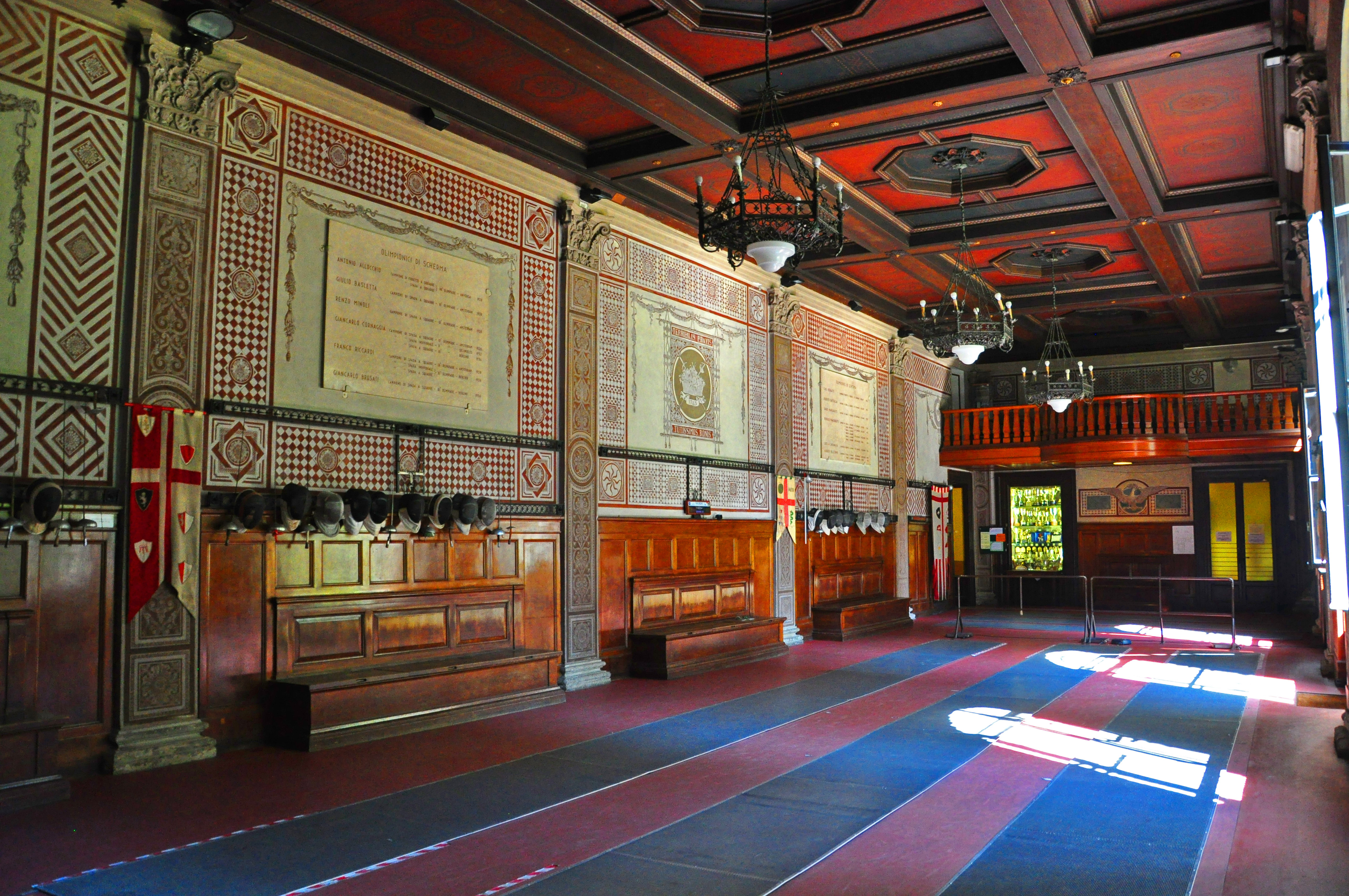
The sala d'armi of the palace

Palazzo Spinola is a 16th-century palazzo in Milan, heavily remodelled during the 19th century. Historically belonging to the sestiere di Porta Nuova, it is located at 10 Via San Paolo. Since 1808 it has been the seat of the Garden Society.

== History and description ==
Commissioned in 1580 by the Genoese banker Leonardo Spinola, a trusted man of Tommaso Marino another Genoese banker, the palace was built in three separate campaigns between 1570 and 1615 by an unknown architect. Hypotheses have been put forward regarding Pellegrino Pellegrini and Martino Bassi, but only Bassi's participation would now seem undoubted; today, the building owes much of its interior appearance to 19th-century alterations: the simple façade, in which the ashlar-work portal stands out, allows little to be seen of the luxurious interiors.

Famous is the Sala d'oro designed by Gerolamo Arganini and decorated by Giacomo Tazzini: the hall, remodelled on the occasion of the wedding of Emperor Ferdinand I, is spacious and monumental, surrounded by a colonnade decorated with fregi and surmounted by the entablature forming the tribune for the orchestra; the frescos and gilded stuccoes on an ivory background also stand out; similarly the Sala d'silver named after the silver-coloured stuccoes by Luigi Tatti.

Badly hit by Anglo-American bombing in 1943, the building caught fire and although the architecture of the façade and courtyard remained intact, the fire destroyed almost all of the upper floors and parts of the ground floor, resulting in the collapse of the roofs and most of the vaults and the loss of the two rooms described above, of which only the walls were saved.

Another noteworthy room is undoubtedly the Ballroom, whose name suggests it was the venue for balls: a room that caught the attention of Stendhal, who was a guest in the palace many times during balls and celebrations. In the garden courtyard, there is the sixteenth-century belvedere tower, a room often used in garden parties on summer occasions.

Palazzo Spinola housed until his death the large studio of the painter Luigi Conconi (1852—1917), who shared it for a long time with Gaetano Previati (1852—1920).

== See also ==
- Casa Atellani

== Sources ==
=== Italian sources ===
- Baroni, Costantino, Il palazzo di Leonardo Spinola, in "Milano", 1935, pp. 352–357 (Trivulziana Arch Per B1)
- Bascapè, Giacomo C., I palazzi della vecchia Milano, Milano, Hoepli 1986, pp. 278–81
- Bruschetti, Ampelio - Madini, Pietro - Magistretti, Marco, Il Palazzo Spinola e la Società del Giardino in Milano, Milano, Arti Grafiche *Bertarelli 1919 (Trivulziana Arch D 37)
- Bruschetti, Ampelio, La Società del Giardino in Milano. Memorie ed Appunti, Milano, Zanaboni e Gabuzzi 1899 (Trivulziana Arch I 33)
- Cassi Ramelli, Antonio, Vita e rinascita del palazzo Spinola in Milano, estratto da Aspetti problemi realizzazioni di Milano, scritti in onore di Cesare Chiodi, Milano, Giuffrè 1957 pp. 177–194 (Sormani Q CONS 500)
- Della Torre, S., L’inventario dei beni mobili trovati nella residenza del conte Giovanni Anguissola, Governatore di Como (1578), in "Periodico della Società Storica Comense", LVI, 1994 (ma 1995), pp. 139–158.
- Madini, Pietro, Stendhal a Milano e il Casino degli Andeghee, Milano, Società del Giardino 1933 (Sormani L CONS 89)
- Società del Giardino, Società del Giardino 1783-1983, Milano 1983
