= Ushuaia – Malvinas Argentinas International Airport =

Airport in Tierra del Fuego

Ushuaia – Malvinas Argentinas International Airport Aeropuerto Internacional de Ushuaia Malvinas Argentinas
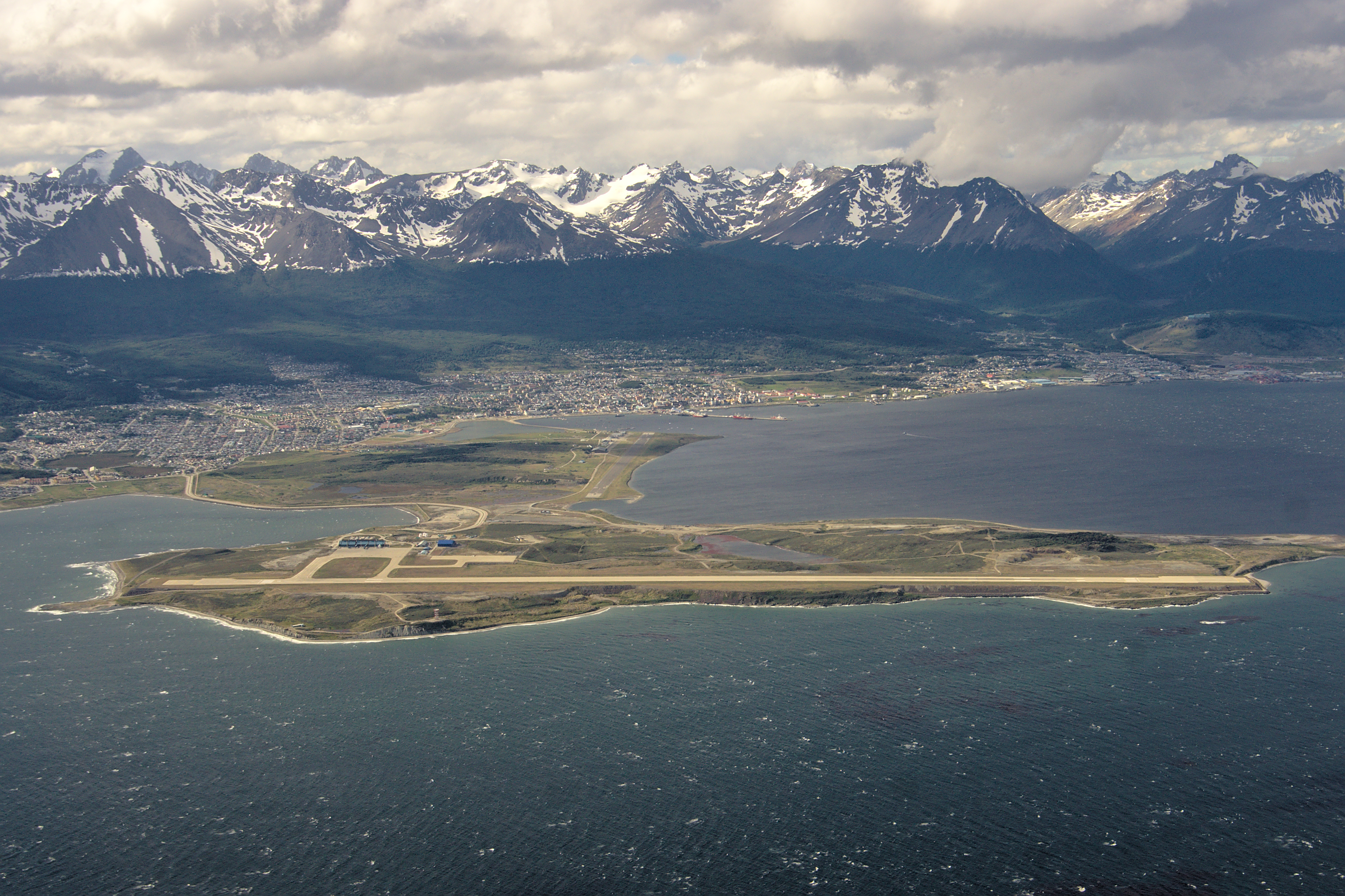
- IATA: USH; ICAO: SAWH

Summary
- Airport type: Public
- Operator: Civil Aviation Administration
- Location: Ushuaia, Argentina
- Elevation AMSL: 102 ft (31 m)
- Coordinates: 54°50′36″S 68°17′40″W
- Website: www.aeropuertoushuaia.com

Map
- Location of airport in Tierra del Fuego USH (Argentina)

Runways
| Direction | Length | | Surface |
| Direction | m | ft | Surface |
|---|---|---|---|
| 07/25 | 2,804 | 9,199 | Concrete |

Statistics (2021)
- Total passengers: 512,000
- Sources: AIP ORSNA SkyVector

Ushuaia – Malvinas Argentinas International Airport (Spanish: Aeropuerto Internacional de Ushuaia Malvinas Argentinas, IATA: USH, ICAO: SAWH) is located 4 km (2.5 mi) south of the center of Ushuaia, a city on the island of Tierra del Fuego in the Tierra del Fuego Province of Argentina.

== Overview ==
The airport was opened in 1995, replacing an older one, which is now in use with the Ushuaia Aeroclub (ICAO: SAWO). The new airport has been used by various airlines at different periods. It is the world's southernmost international airport and is often used by passengers as a cruise-ship gateway to the Antarctic.

Ushuaia International Airport can accommodate airplanes as large as the Boeing 747. Tower Air operated 747s into the airport, and Aerolíneas Argentinas operated 747-400s into the airport during events of high passenger numbers (such as entire cruise-ship passenger payloads) until retiring the 747 in February 2012. Two chartered Air France Concordes also visited in the past: F-BTSD arriving from Buenos Aires and continuing to Santiago, Chile, in early 1999; the second arriving from Easter Island, Chile and continuing to Buenos Aires prior to the cessation of most Concorde charter flights on 25 July 2000 (following the crash of Air France 4590). In the past, Condor, LTU, Air Berlin and Lufthansa also offered charter flights from Germany, Austrian Airlines from Austria, and XL Airways UK and First Choice Airways from the United Kingdom. It also chartered flights to Maputo, Mozambique.

The airport's name reflects Argentina's claims of sovereignty over the British Overseas Territory of the Falkland Islands.

The airport is on a peninsula extending south into the Beagle Channel, and all approaches and takeoffs are over the water.

== Airlines and destinations ==
| Airlines | Destinations |
|---|---|
| Aerolíneas Argentinas | Buenos Aires–Aeroparque, Buenos Aires–Ezeiza, Córdoba (AR), El Calafate, Trelew |
| Gol Linhas Aéreas | Seasonal: São Paulo–Guarulhos |
| JetSmart Argentina | Buenos Aires–Aeroparque, Buenos Aires–Ezeiza |
| LADE | Comodoro Rivadavia, El Calafate, Río Gallegos, Río Grande |
| LATAM Brasil | Seasonal: São Paulo–Guarulhos |

== See also ==
- Transport in Argentina
- List of airports in Argentina
