= Pablo Atchugarry =

Uruguayan artist

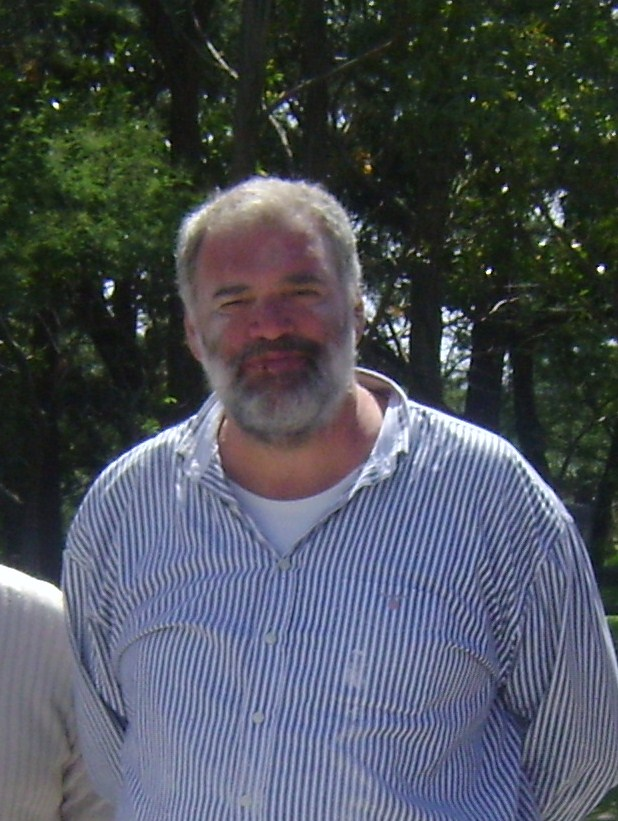
- Born: August 23, 1954 (age 71); Montevideo, Uruguay

Pablo Atchugarry (born August 23, 1954) is a Uruguayan artist, best known for his abstract sculptural art. His works are included in many major collections, both private and public, and he has held more than one hundred solo and collective exhibitions worldwide.

== Early life and education ==
Pablo Atchugarry was born in Montevideo, Uruguay on August 23, 1954. His parents, Maria Cristina Bonomi and Pedro Atchugarry Rizzo, were passionate art enthusiasts. Before setting aside his artistic ambitions to support his family, Pedro Atchugarry trained under the great Uruguayan Constructivist Joaquín Torres-García and such experience enabled him to guide his son's artistic talents and to encourage Pablo to take up painting.

At age eleven, Atchugarry began showing his works and as he progressed through adolescence, he started feeling the need to express himself in various forms and materials, such as cement, iron, and wood. By age eighteen, he had his first personal exhibition of paintings at the Civic Room in Montevideo in 1972 and he had undertaken his first experiment with sculpture – a horse cast in concrete. In the following years as he took up and dropped architectural studies, he found venues in Brazil and Argentina to exhibit his paintings, which featured a mixture of abstraction and Constructivist concepts. However, in 1977, Atchugarry departed South America and traveled to Europe.

== Career ==
=== 1977–1989 ===
Atchugarry's intention in traveling to Europe was to study and perfect his art. As early as 1977, he had his first successful display at an art fair in Copenhagen. During his travels, he visited Spain, France, and Italy, and while visiting Milan he reconnected with a woman he had met in Paris. She brought him to the city of Lecco where he mounted his first solo Italian show in 1978. As a result of the success of the show, his paintings were exhibited in a variety of European cities, including Milan, Copenhagen, Paris, Chur, Bergamo, and Stockholm.

After experimenting with a range of materials, in 1979, Atchugarry took up carving marble, and he created his first sculpture in Carrara marble entitled La Lumiere. His first monumental sculpture made of Carrara was completed in 1982, and later that year he moved permanently to Lecco. There, he began work on the sculpture, La Pieta, which was carved from a single block of marble weighing twelve tons. In 1987 he held his first solo sculpture exhibition, curated by Raffaele de Grada, in Bramantino's Crypt in Milan.

Since 1989, his poetic sculptural style has caused Atchugarry to express himself through monumental works, which are now situated in various public spaces in Europe and Latin America.

=== 1996–present ===
In late 1996, he saw the installation of the sculpture Semilla de la Esperanza (Seed of Hope) in the monumental sculpture park in the grounds of Uruguay's government building.

The artist founded the Museo Pablo Atchugarry in Lecco, and it was inaugurated on 25 September 1999. This museum houses works spanning Atchugarry's entire career, as well as bibliographical documentation and an archive. Visitors also have the opportunity to observe him in his workshop, which is located next door to the museum.

During the spring of 2001, twenty years after his arrival in Italy, the Province of Milan organized a retrospective of Atchugarry's work entitled "The Infinite Evolutions of Marble" at the Palazzo Isimbardi in Milan. That same year, he sculpted his first monumental work entitled Obelisk of the Third Millennium, a six-meter-high Carrara marble sculpture for the Italian town of Udine.

In early 2002, Atchugarry's sculpture Ideali in Garfagnana marble was given to the Prince Rainier of Monaco as a tribute to the 50th anniversary of his reign; it is located on the Avenue Princesse Grace of Monte-Carlo. During the spring, his Monument to the Civilisation and Culture of Lecco Labour was inaugurated as the centerpiece of the Caleotto Roundabout in Lecco in May 2002. Made of the Bernini variety of Carrara marble, this work was carved from a 33-ton block and stand 6.10 meters tall. Lastly in July 2002, Atchugarry received the Michelangelo Award in Carrara in recognition of his career as an artist.

His sculpture entitled Sensation of the Infinite was added to the collection of the Lercaro Museum in Bologna in 2003. That same year, Atchugarry represented Uruguay in the 50th International Exhibition of the Visual Arts at the Venice Biennale of 2003 with an installation of eight sculptures in Carrara marble and Grey Bardiglio marble entitled Dreaming of Peace.

In 2005 the Berardo Collection in Lisbon, Portugal added to its patrimony Camino Vital, 1999, standing nearly 5 meters tall in Carrara marble. Another important project undertaken by Atchugarry during 2005 was the opening of a new atelier at Punta del Este, Uruguay, where he works during the European winter.

Atchugarry opened the Fundación Pablo Atchugarry in Manantiales, Uruguay in January 2007. This institution aims to provide a stimulus for the arts and create a place for artists of all disciplines to meet in an ideal location that combines nature and art.

After seven years of work, the artist completed the monumental sculpture Cosmic Embrace (2005-2011) in 2011. That same year, Hollis Taggart Galleries in New York City organized a solo show "Pablo Atchugarry: Heroic Activities" that featured an essay by the notable art critic, Jonathan Goodman. Expanding his presence in New York, the Time Square Alliance association selected Atchugarry's sculpture Dreaming New York to be exhibited in Times Square during The Armory Show Art Fair in New York City during March 2012.

In late 2013, Mondadori Electa published the Catalogo Generale delle scultura, two volumes edited by Professor Carlo Pirovano cataloging every sculpture produced by the artist between 1971 and 2013.

In 2014, a work apparently by Atchugarry named The Don was described by a public art coordinator in a report to Cambridge City Council, England, as "possibly the poorest quality work that has ever been submitted to the council", which refused planning permission for the sculpture. In 2024, the council ordered its removal after it appeared in another location without permission.

Atchugarry currently lives and works between Lecco and Manantiales where he oversees the development of the Fundación Pablo Atchugarry and the international monumental sculpture park, as well as teaching and promoting art.

== Materials and style ==
For each sculpture, Atchugarry personally selects an appropriate block and is actively involved in carving it, with minimal help from assistants. He works with white Carrara marble from Tuscany, gray stone from Bardiglio, black from Belgium, and pink from Portugal. Aside from working with stone, he utilizes bronze finished in various patinas, ceramic, and, more rarely, various types of wood.

There is no ideal view from which to examine one of Atchugarry's sculptures. The viewer is supposed to observe each work as a whole, and contemplate how all of the sculpture's parts work together. Though composed in different materials, his works are united by a tightly defined set of forms that he consistently recombines. Manipulating sinuous curves, accordion folds, ovoid apertures, and a typically vertical alignment, Atchugarry creates forms that are highly evocative of plants and trees, breaking waves, still lifes, and the human figure. Thus, his sculptures are both figural and abstract.

== Exhibitions ==
In 1972, Atchugarry had his first personal exhibition of paintings at the Civic Room in Montevideo, Uruguay.

In 1987, the artist held his first solo sculpture exhibition in Bramantino's Crypt in Milan.

During the spring of 2001, the Province of Milan organized a retrospective of Atchugarry's work entitled "The Infinite Evolutions of Marble" at the Palazzo Isimbardi in Milan.

In 2003, Atchugarry represented Uruguay in the 50th International Exhibition of the Visual Arts at the Venice Biennale of 2003 with an installation of eight sculptures in Garrara marble and Grey Bardiglio marble entitled Dreaming of Peace.

From 2007 to 2008, a retrospective exhibition dedicated to his work entitled "The Plastic Space of Light" was held in Brazil, accompanied by a critical text written by Luca Massimo Barbero. Province of Milan Initially staged at the Banco do Brasil Cultural Centre in Brasília, the exhibition travelled to the MuBe (Museu Brasileiro da Escultura) in São Paulo and the Museu Oscar Niemeyer in Curitiba.

During the winter of 2011, Hollis Taggart Galleries in New York mountedthe solo show "Pablo Atchugarry: Heroic Activities." Hollis Taggart Galleries held another show of the artist's work titled "Pablo Atchugarry: Lives in Stone" from 7 November 2013 to 4 January 2014.

From 22 May 2015 to 7 February 2016, forty sculptures by Atchugarry were exhibited at the Museum dei Fori Imperiali – Mercati di Traino in Rome as part of the exhibition "Eternal City, eternal marbles."

During spring 2016, Hollis Taggart exhibited "Pablo Atchugarry: Invocations of the Soul" from 5 May to 11 June 2016. The catalog for this show contains original texts by Luciano Caprile, Jonathan Goodman, Fundación Pablo Atchugarry and Pietro Dormia as well as press releases and photographs from other major exhibitions of Atchugarry's work.
