= Giuseppe Meda =

Italian painter

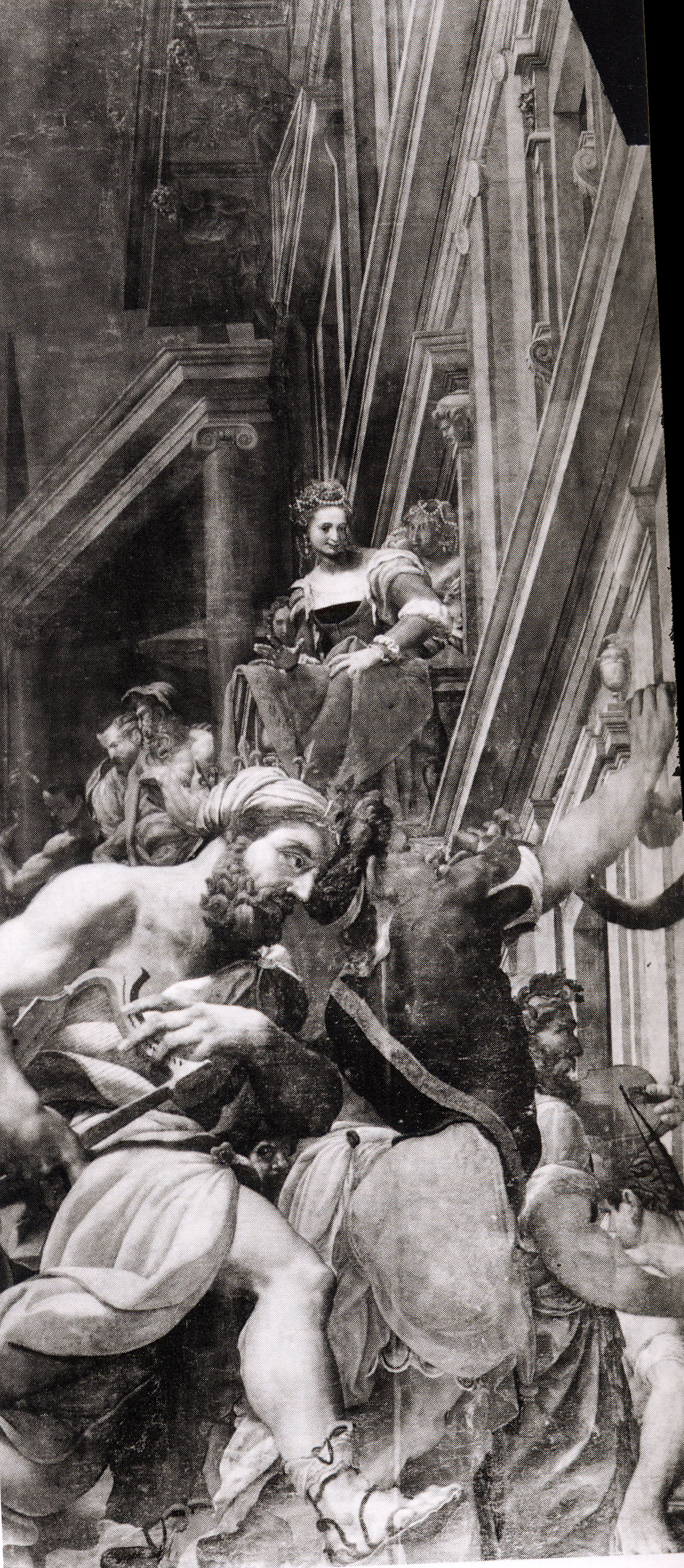
- David danza davanti all'arca
- Born: c. 1534; Milan, Italy
- Died: 1599

Giuseppe Meda, originally Giuseppe Lomazzo (c. 1534–1599) was an Italian painter, architect and hydraulics engineer.

Born in Milan, he apprenticed as painter under Bernardino Campi. He also studied as architect and engineer, and planned a never realized though interesting project to make navigable the Adda River from Cornate and Paderno.

As a painter he was an exponent of the late Lombard Mannerism, with influences by Michelangelo, Leonardo and the Milanese Gaudenzio Ferrari. His works include the frescoes in the Cathedral of Monza, in collaboration with Giuseppe Arcimboldo, and the decoration of the organ in the Duomo of Milan.

As an architect he often completed works begun by Pellegrino Tibaldi, such as the Church of St. Sebastian and Lazzaretto Chapel in Milan. He also provided drawing for the Escorial. He also started a project for the Trivulzio family chapels at San Stefano in Brolo and the reconstruction of S. Lorenzo.
