= List of international airports by country =

This is a list of international airports by country. These are airports which are typically equipped with customs and immigration facilities to handle international flights to and from other nations.

== Passenger Roles (2011–2023) ==
- Large (18,500,000+ Annual Passengers)
- Medium (3,500,000–18,499,999 Annual Passengers)
- Small (500,000–3,499,999 Annual Passengers)
- Non-Hub (10,000–499,999 Annual Passengers)
- Reliever (1–9,999 Annual Passengers)

== Africa ==
=== Northern Africa ===
==== Algeria ====
Location	Airport	IATA Code
Algiers	Houari Boumediene Airport	ALG
Annaba	Rabah Bitat Airport	AAE
Batna	Batna Airport	BLJ
Béjaïa	Soummam Airport	BJA
Chlef	Chlef International Airport	CFK
Constantine	Mohamed Boudiaf International Airport	CZL
Ghardaïa	Noumérat – Moufdi Zakaria Airport	GHA
Jijel	Jijel Ferhat Abbas Airport	GJL
Oran	Oran Es Senia Airport	ORN
Oumache	Biskra Airport	BSK
Sétif	Ain Arnat Airport	QSF
Tlemcen	Zenata – Messali El Hadj Airport	TLM

==== Egypt ====
Location	Airport	IATA Code
Alexandria	Alexandria International Airport	HBE
Asyut	Assiut Airport	ATZ
Aswan	Aswan International Airport	ASW
Cairo	Cairo International Airport	CAI
Cairo	Sphinx International Airport	SPX
El Arish	El Arish International Airport	AAC
El Dabaa	El Alamein International Airport	DBB
Hurghada	Hurghada International Airport	HRG
Luxor	Luxor International Airport	LXR
Marsa Alam	Marsa Alam International Airport	RMF
Mersa Matruh	Mersa Matruh International Airport	MUH
Saint Catherine	St. Catherine International Airport	SKV
Sharm El Sheikh	Sharm El Sheikh International Airport	SSH
Sohag	Sohag International Airport	HMB
Taba	Taba International Airport	TCP

==== Libya ====
Location	Airport	IATA Code
Benghazi	Benina International Airport	BEN
Sabha	Sabha Airport	SEB
Tripoli	Tripoli International Airport	TIP
Tajoura	Mitiga International Airport	MJI

==== Morocco ====
Location	Airport	IATA Code
Agadir	Agadir–Al Massira Airport	AGA
Beni Mellal	Beni Mellal Airport	BEM
Casablanca	Mohammed V International Airport	CMN
Essaouira	Essaouira-Mogador Airport	ESU
Fes	Fès–Saïs Airport	FEZ
Marrakesh	Marrakesh Menara Airport	RAK
Nador	Nador International Airport	NDR
Ouarzazate	Ouarzazate Airport	OZZ
Oujda	Angads Airport	OUD
Rabat	Rabat–Salé Airport	RBA
Tangier	Tangier Ibn Battouta Airport	TNG
Tetouan	Sania Ramel Airport	TTU
Dakhla	Dakhla Airport	VIL
Laayoune	Hassan I Airport	EUN

==== Sudan ====
Location	Airport	IATA Code
Khartoum	Khartoum International Airport	KRT
Port Sudan	Port Sudan New International Airport	PZU

==== Tunisia ====
Location	Airport	IATA Code
Djerba	Djerba–Zarzis International Airport	DJE
Enfidha	Enfidha–Hammamet International Airport	NBE
Monastir	Monastir Habib Bourguiba International Airport	MIR
Sfax	Sfax–Thyna International Airport	SFA
Tabarka	Tabarka–Aïn Draham International Airport	TBJ
Tozeur	Tozeur–Nefta International Airport	TOE
Tunis	Tunis–Carthage International Airport	TUN

=== Western Africa ===
==== Benin ====
Location	Airport	IATA Code
Cotonou	Cadjehoun Airport	COO

==== Burkina Faso ====
Location	Airport	IATA Code
Bobo-Dioulasso	Bobo Dioulasso Airport	BOY
Ouagadougou	Thomas Sankara International Airport Ouagadougou	OUA

==== Cape Verde ====
Location	Airport	IATA Code
Boa Vista	Aristides Pereira International Airport	BVC
Sal Island	Amílcar Cabral International Airport	SID
Praia, Santiago Island	Nelson Mandela International Airport	RAI
São Vicente	Cesária Évora Airport	VXE

==== The Gambia ====
Location	Airport	IATA Code
Banjul	Banjul International Airport	BJL

==== Ghana ====
Location	Airport	IATA Code
Accra	Accra International Airport	ACC
Kumasi	Prempeh I International Airport	KMS
Takoradi	Takoradi Airport	TKD
Sunyani	Sunyani Airport	NYI
Ho	Ho Airport	HZO
Wa	Wa Airport	WZA
Tamale	Tamale Airport	TML

==== Guinea ====
Location	Airport	IATA Code
Conakry	Conakry International Airport	CKY

==== Guinea-Bissau ====
Location	Airport	IATA Code
Bissau	Osvaldo Vieira International Airport	OXB

==== Ivory Coast ====
Location	Airport	IATA Code
Abidjan	Félix-Houphouët-Boigny International Airport	ABJ

==== Liberia ====
Location	Airport	IATA Code
Monrovia	Roberts International Airport	ROB

==== Mali ====
Location	Airport	IATA Code
Bamako	Modibo Keita International Airport	BKO

==== Mauritania ====
Location	Airport	IATA Code
Nouakchott	Nouakchott–Oumtounsy International Airport	NKC
Nouadhibou	Nouadhibou International Airport	NDB
Atar	Atar International Airport	ATR

==== Niger ====
Location	Airport	IATA Code
Niamey	Diori Hamani International Airport	NIM

==== Nigeria ====
Location	Airport	IATA Code
Abuja	Nnamdi Azikiwe International Airport	ABV
Calabar	Margaret Ekpo International Airport	CBQ
Asaba, Delta	Asaba International Airport	ABB
Kano	Mallam Aminu Kano International Airport	KAN
Lagos	Murtala Muhammed International Airport	LOS
Port Harcourt	Port Harcourt International Airport	PHC
Enugu	Akanu Ibiam International Airport	ENU
Sokoto	Sadiq Abubakar III International Airport	SKO

==== Saint Helena, Ascension and Tristan da Cunha ====
Location	Airport	IATA Code
Saint Helena	Saint Helena Airport	HLE

==== Senegal ====
Location	Airport	IATA Code
Dakar	Blaise Diagne International Airport	DSS

==== Sierra Leone ====
Location	Airport	IATA Code
Freetown	Freetown International Airport	FNA

==== Togo ====
Location	Airport	IATA Code
Lomé	Lomé–Tokoin International Airport	LFW

=== Central Africa ===
==== Angola ====
Location	Airport	IATA Code
Catumbela	Catumbela Airport	CBT
Luanda	Quatro de Fevereiro Airport	LAD
Lubango	Lubango Airport	SDD

==== Cameroon ====
Location	Airport	IATA Code
Douala	Douala International Airport	DLA
Yaoundé	Yaoundé Nsimalen International Airport	NSI

==== Central African Republic ====
Location	Airport	IATA Code
Bangui	Bangui M'Poko International Airport	BGF

==== Chad ====
Location	Airport	IATA Code
N'Djamena	N'Djamena International Airport	NDJ

==== Democratic Republic of the Congo ====
Location	Airport	IATA Code
Goma	Goma International Airport	GOM
Kinshasa	N'djili Airport	FIH
Kisangani	Kisangani Bangoka International Airport	FKI
Lubumbashi	Lubumbashi International Airport	FBM

==== Equatorial Guinea ====
Location	Airport	IATA Code
Malabo	Malabo International Airport	SSG

==== Gabon ====
Location	Airport	IATA Code
Franceville	M'Vengue El Hadj Omar Bongo Ondimba International Airport	MVB
Libreville	Léon-Mba International Airport	LBV
Port-Gentil	Port-Gentil International Airport	POG

==== Republic of the Congo ====
Location	Airport	IATA Code
Brazzaville	Maya-Maya Airport	BZV
Pointe-Noire	Agostinho-Neto International Airport	PNR

==== São Tomé and Príncipe ====
Location	Airport	IATA Code
São Tomé	São Tomé International Airport	TMS

=== Southern Africa ===
==== Botswana ====
Location	Airport	IATA Code
Gaborone	Sir Seretse Khama International Airport	GBE
Maun	Maun Airport	MUB
Francistown	Francistown International Airport	FRW
Kasane	Kasane Airport	BBK

==== Eswatini ====
Location	Airport	IATA Code
Manzini	King Mswati III International Airport	SHO

==== Lesotho ====
Location	Airport	IATA Code
Maseru	Moshoeshoe I International Airport	MSU

==== Namibia ====
Location	Airport	IATA Code
Windhoek	Hosea Kutako International Airport	WDH
Walvis Bay	Walvis Bay Airport	WVB

==== South Africa ====
Location	Airport	IATA Code
Bloemfontein	Bram Fischer International Airport	BFN
Cape Town	Cape Town International Airport	CPT
Durban	King Shaka International Airport	DUR
East London	East London Airport	ELS
Johannesburg	O. R. Tambo International Airport	JNB
Johannesburg	Lanseria International Airport	HLA
Nelspruit	Kruger Mpumalanga International Airport	MQP
Polokwane	Polokwane International Airport	PTG

=== Eastern Africa ===
==== Burundi ====
Location	Airport	IATA Code
Bujumbura	Melchior Ndadaye International Airport	BJM

==== Comoros ====
Location	Airport	IATA Code
Moroni	Prince Said Ibrahim International Airport	HAH

==== Djibouti ====
Location	Airport	IATA Code
Djibouti	Djibouti–Ambouli International Airport	JIB

==== Eritrea ====
Location	Airport	IATA Code
Asmara	Asmara International Airport	ASM

==== Ethiopia ====
Location	Airport	IATA Code
Addis Ababa	Addis Ababa Bole International Airport	ADD
Dire Dawa	Dire Dawa Airport	DIR
Bir Dar	Bahidar Airport	BJR
Mekele	Alula Aba Nega Airport	MQX

==== Kenya ====
Location	Airport	IATA Code
Eldoret	Eldoret International Airport	EDL
Mombasa	Moi International Airport	MBA
Kisumu	Kisumu International Airport	KIS
Nairobi	Jomo Kenyatta International Airport	NBO

==== Madagascar ====
Location	Airport	IATA Code
Antananarivo	Ivato International Airport	TNR
Antsiranana	Arrachart Airport	DIE
Mahajanga	Amborovy Airport	MJN
Nosy Be	Fascene Airport	NOS
Toamasina	Toamasina Airport	TMM
Tôlanaro	Tôlanaro Airport	FTU
Toliara	Toliara Airport	TLE

==== Malawi ====
Location	Airport	IATA Code
Blantyre	Chileka International Airport	BLZ
Lilongwe	Lilongwe International Airport	LLW

==== Mauritius ====
Location	Airport	IATA Code
Plaine Magnien	Sir Seewoosagur Ramgoolam International Airport	MRU

==== Mayotte ====
Location	Airport	IATA Code
Dzaoudzi	Dzaoudzi–Pamandzi International Airport	DZA

==== Mozambique ====
Location	Airport	IATA Code
Maputo	Maputo International Airport	MPM
Beira	Beira Airport	BEW
Inhambane	Inhambane Airport	INH
Nampula	Nampula Airport	APL
Pemba	Pemba Airport	POL
Tete	Chingozi Airport	TET
Vilankulo	Vilankulo Airport	VNX

==== Réunion ====
Location	Airport	IATA Code
Saint-Denis	Roland Garros Airport	RUN

==== Rwanda ====
Location	Airport	IATA Code
Kigali	Kigali International Airport	KGL

==== Seychelles ====
Location	Airport	IATA Code
Victoria	Seychelles International Airport	SEZ

==== Somalia ====
Location	Airport	IATA Code
Bosaso	Bosaso Airport	BSA
Galkayo	Abdullahi Yusuf Airport	GLK
Garowe	Garowe Airport	GGR
Hargeisa	Hargeisa Airport	HGA
Kismayo	Kismayo Airport	KMU
Mogadishu	Aden Adde International Airport	MGQ

==== South Sudan ====
Location	Airport	IATA Code
Juba	Juba International Airport	JUB
Malakal	Malakal Airport	MAK

==== Tanzania ====
Location	Airport	IATA Code
Arusha	Arusha Airport	ARK
Dar es Salaam	Julius Nyerere International Airport	DAR
Hai District	Kilimanjaro International Airport	JRO
Mwanza	Mwanza Airport	MWZ
Tanga	Tanga Airport	TGT
Unguja, Zanzibar	Abeid Amani Karume International Airport	ZNZ

==== Uganda ====
Location	Airport	IATA Code
Arua	Arua Airport	RUA
Entebbe	Entebbe International Airport	EBB
Gulu	Gulu Airport	ULU

==== Zambia ====
Location	Airport	IATA Code
Livingstone	Harry Mwanga Nkumbula International Airport	LVI
Lusaka	Kenneth Kaunda International Airport	LUN
Mfuwe	Mfuwe Airport	MFU
Ndola	Simon Mwansa Kapwepwe International Airport	NLA

==== Zimbabwe ====
Location	Airport	IATA Code
Harare	Robert Gabriel Mugabe International Airport	HRE
Victoria Falls	Victoria Falls Airport	VFA
Bulawayo	Joshua Mqabuko Nkomo International Airport	BUQ

== Americas ==
=== Anguilla ===
Location	Airport	IATA Code
The Valley	Clayton J. Lloyd International Airport	AXA

=== Antigua and Barbuda ===
Location	Airport	IATA Code
St. John's	V. C. Bird International Airport	ANU

=== Aruba ===
Location	Airport	IATA Code
Oranjestad	Queen Beatrix International Airport	AUA

=== The Bahamas ===
Location	Airport	IATA Code
Nassau	Lynden Pindling International Airport	NAS
Chub Cay	Chub Cay International Airport	CCZ
Exuma	Exuma International Airport	GGT
Freeport	Grand Bahama International Airport	FPO
North Eleuthera	North Eleuthera Airport	ELH
South Eleuthera	Rock Sound International Airport	RSD
Marsh Harbour	Marsh Harbour International Airport	MHH

=== Barbados ===
Location	Airport	IATA Code
Bridgetown	Grantley Adams International Airport	BGI

=== British Virgin Islands ===
Location	Airport	IATA Code
Road Town	Terrance B. Lettsome International Airport	EIS

=== Caribbean Netherlands ===
Location	Airport	IATA Code
Kralendijk, Bonaire	Flamingo International Airport	BON
Oranjestad, Sint Eustatius	F. D. Roosevelt Airport	EUX
Flat Point, Saba	Juancho E. Yrausquin Airport	SAB

=== Cayman Islands ===
Location	Airport	IATA Code
Cayman Brac	Charles Kirkconnell International Airport	CYB
Georgetown	Owen Roberts International Airport	GCM

=== Cuba ===
Location	Airport	IATA Code
Camagüey	Ignacio Agramonte International Airport	CMW
Cayo Coco	Jardines del Rey Airport	CCC
Cayo Largo del Sur	Vilo Acuña Airport	CYO
Cienfuegos	Jaime González Airport	CFG
Havana	José Martí International Airport	HAV
Holguín	Frank País Airport	HOG
Santa Clara	Abel Santamaría Airport	SNU
Santiago de Cuba	Antonio Maceo Airport	SCU
Varadero	Juan Gualberto Gómez Airport	VRA

=== Curaçao ===
Location	Airport	IATA Code
Willemstad	Curaçao International Airport	CUR

=== Dominica ===
Location	Airport	IATA Code
Marigot	Douglas–Charles Airport	DOM

=== Dominican Republic ===
Location	Airport	IATA Code
Barahona	María Montez International Airport	BRX
La Romana	La Romana International Airport	LRM
Punta Cana	Punta Cana International Airport	PUJ
Samana	Samaná El Catey International Airport	AZS
San Felipe de Puerto Plata	Gregorio Luperón International Airport	POP
Santiago de los Caballeros	Cibao International Airport	STI
Santo Domingo	Las Américas International Airport	SDQ

=== Grenada ===
Location	Airport	IATA Code
St George's	Maurice Bishop International Airport	GND

=== Guadeloupe ===
Location	Airport	IATA Code
Pointe-à-Pitre	Pointe-à-Pitre International Airport	PTP

=== Haiti ===
Location	Airport	IATA Code
Cap-Haïtien	Cap-Haïtien International Airport	CAP
Port-au-Prince	Toussaint Louverture International Airport	PAP

=== Jamaica ===
Location	Airport	IATA Code
Kingston	Norman Manley International Airport	KIN
Montego Bay	Sangster International Airport	MBJ

=== Martinique ===
Location	Airport	IATA Code
Fort-de-France	Martinique Aimé Césaire International Airport	FDF

=== Montserrat ===
Location	Airport	IATA Code
Brades	John A. Osborne Airport	MNI

=== Puerto Rico ===
Location	Airport	IATA Code
Aguadilla	Rafael Hernández International Airport	BQN
Ponce	Mercedita International Airport	PSE
San Juan	Fernando Luis Ribas Dominicci Airport	SIG
San Juan	Luis Muñoz Marín International Airport	SJU

=== Saint Barthélemy ===
Location	Airport	IATA Code
Saint Jean	Gustaf III Airport	SBH

=== Saint Kitts and Nevis ===
Location	Airport	IATA Code
Basseterre	Robert L. Bradshaw International Airport	SKB

=== Saint Lucia ===
Location	Airport	IATA Code
Vieux Fort Quarter	Hewanorra International Airport	UVF

=== Saint Vincent and the Grenadines ===
Location	Airport	IATA Code
Kingstown	Argyle International Airport	SVD
Canouan	Canouan Airport	CIW

=== Sint Maarten ===
Location	Airport	IATA Code
Philipsburg	Princess Juliana International Airport	SXM

=== Trinidad and Tobago ===
Location	Airport	IATA Code
Port of Spain	Piarco International Airport	POS
Tobago	A.N.R. Robinson International Airport	TAB

=== Turks and Caicos Islands ===
Location	Airport	IATA Code
Blue Hills	Providenciales Airport	PLS

=== U.S. Virgin Islands ===
Location	Airport	IATA Code
Charlotte Amalie	Cyril E. King Airport	STT
Christiansted	Henry E. Rohlsen Airport	STX

=== Belize ===
Location	Airport	IATA Code
Belize City	Philip S. W. Goldson International Airport	BZE

=== Costa Rica ===
Location	Airport	IATA Code
Liberia	Daniel Oduber Quirós International Airport	LIR
San José	Juan Santamaría International Airport	SJO

=== El Salvador ===
Location	Airport	IATA Code
San Salvador	El Salvador International Airport	SAL

=== Guatemala ===
Location	Airport	IATA Code
Flores	Mundo Maya International Airport	FRS
Guatemala City	La Aurora International Airport	GUA

=== Honduras ===
Location	Airport	IATA Code
La Ceiba	Golosón International Airport	LCE
Roatán	Juan Manuel Gálvez International Airport	RTB
San Pedro Sula	Ramón Villeda Morales International Airport	SAP
Tegucigalpa	Toncontín International Airport	TGU
Comayagua	Comayagua International Airport	XPL

=== Nicaragua ===
Location	Airport	IATA Code
Managua	Augusto C. Sandino International Airport	MGA
Bluefields	Bluefields Airport	BEF
Corn Island	Corn Island Airport	RNI

=== Panama ===
Location	Airport	IATA Code
Bocas del Toro	Bocas del Toro "Isla Colón" International Airport	BOC
David, Chiriquí	Enrique Malek International Airport	DAV
Panama City	Albrook "Marcos A. Gelabert" International Airport	PAC
Panama City	Panama Pacifico International Airport	BLB
Panama City	Tocumen International Airport	PTY
Rio Hato	Scarlett Martínez International Airport	RIH

=== Bermuda ===
Location	Airport	IATA Code	Passenger Role
Hamilton	L.F. Wade International Airport	BDA	Small

=== Canada ===
Location	Airport	IATA Code	Provinces/Territories
Abbotsford	Abbotsford International Airport	YXX	British Columbia
Barrie (Oro-Medonte)	Lake Simcoe Regional Airport	YLK	Ontario
Calgary	Calgary International Airport	YYC	Alberta
Charlottetown	Charlottetown Airport	YYG	Prince Edward Island
Deer Lake	Deer Lake Regional Airport	YDA	Newfoundland and Labrador
Edmonton	Edmonton International Airport	YEG	Alberta
Fredericton	Fredericton International Airport	YFC	New Brunswick
Gander	Gander International Airport	YQX	Newfoundland and Labrador
Halifax (Goffs)	Halifax Stanfield International Airport	YHZ	Nova Scotia
Hamilton	John C. Munro Hamilton International Airport	YHM	Ontario
Kamloops	Kamloops Airport	YKA	British Columbia
Kelowna	Kelowna International Airport	YLW	British Columbia
Kingston	Kingston Norman Rogers Airport	YGK	Ontario
Kitchener	Region of Waterloo International Airport	YKF	Ontario
London	London International Airport	YXU	Ontario
Moncton (Dieppe)	Greater Moncton Roméo LeBlanc International Airport	YQM	New Brunswick
Montréal (Dorval)	Montréal–Trudeau International Airport	YUL	Québec
Ottawa	Ottawa Macdonald–Cartier International Airport	YOW	Ontario
Québec City	Québec City Jean Lesage International Airport	YQB	Québec
Regina	Regina International Airport	YQR	Saskatchewan
Saint John	Saint John Airport	YSJ	New Brunswick
Saskatoon	Saskatoon John G. Diefenbaker International Airport	YXE	Saskatchewan
St. John's	St. John's International Airport	YYT	Newfoundland and Labrador
Sydney	JA Douglas McCurdy Sydney Airport	YQY	Nova Scotia
Thunder Bay	Thunder Bay International Airport	YQT	Ontario
Toronto (Mississauga)	Toronto Pearson International Airport	YYZ	Ontario
Toronto	Billy Bishop Toronto City Airport	YTZ	Ontario
Vancouver (Richmond)	Vancouver International Airport	YVR	British Columbia
Victoria (Sidney)	Victoria International Airport	YYJ	British Columbia
Whitehorse	Erik Nielsen Whitehorse International Airport	YXY	Yukon
Windsor	Windsor International Airport	YQG	Ontario
Winnipeg	Winnipeg James Armstrong Richardson International Airport	YWG	Manitoba

=== Greenland ===
Location	Airport	IATA Code
Kangerlussuaq	Kangerlussuaq Airport	SFJ
Nuuk	Nuuk Airport	GOH
Ilulissat	Ilulissat Airport	JAV
Narsarsuaq	Narsarsuaq Airport	UAK

=== Mexico ===
Location	Airport	IATA Code	State
Acapulco	Acapulco International Airport	ACA	Guerrero
Aguascalientes	Aguascalientes International Airport	AGU	Aguascalientes
Cancún	Cancún International Airport	CUN	Quintana Roo
Chihuahua	Chihuahua International Airport	CUU	Chihuahua
Ciudad del Carmen	Ciudad del Carmen International Airport	CME	Campeche
Cozumel	Cozumel International Airport	CZM	Quintana Roo
Culiacán	Culiacán International Airport	CUL	Sinaloa
Durango	Durango International Airport	DGO	Durango
Guadalajara	Guadalajara International Airport	GDL	Jalisco
Hermosillo	Hermosillo International Airport	HMO	Sonora
Huatulco	Bahías de Huatulco International Airport	HUX	Oaxaca
Ixtapa	Ixtapa-Zihuatanejo International Airport	ZIH	Guerrero
León	León/Bajío International Airport	BJX	Guanajuato
Loreto	Loreto International Airport	LTO	Baja California Sur
Los Cabos	Cabo San Lucas International Airport	CSL	Baja California Sur
Los Cabos	Los Cabos International Airport	SJD	Baja California Sur
Manzanillo	Playa de Oro International Airport	ZLO	Colima
Mazatlán	Mazatlán International Airport	MZT	Sinaloa
Mérida	Mérida International Airport	MID	Yucatán
Mexicali	Mexicali International Airport	MXL	Baja California
Mexico City	Mexico City International Airport	MEX	Mexico City
Mexico City	Felipe Ángeles International Airport	NLU	State of Mexico
Monterrey	Monterrey International Airport	MTY	Nuevo León
Morelia	Morelia International Airport	MLM	Michoacán
Oaxaca	Oaxaca International Airport	OAX	Oaxaca
Puebla	Puebla International Airport	PBC	Puebla
Puerto Escondido	Puerto Escondido International Airport	PXM	Oaxaca
Puerto Vallarta	Puerto Vallarta International Airport	PVR	Jalisco
Querétaro	Querétaro Intercontinental Airport	QRO	Querétaro
Reynosa	Reynosa International Airport	REX	Tamaulipas
Saltillo	Saltillo International Airport	SLW	Coahuila
San Luis Potosí	San Luis Potosí International Airport	SLP	San Luis Potosí
Tampico	Tampico International Airport	TAM	Tamaulipas
Tepic	Tepic International Airport	TPQ	Nayarit
Tijuana	Tijuana International Airport	TIJ	Baja California
Toluca	Toluca International Airport	TLC	State of Mexico
Torreón	Torreón International Airport	TRC	Coahuila
Tulum	Tulum International Airport	TQO	Coahuila
Uruapan	Uruapan International Airport	UPN	Michoacán
Tuxtla Gutiérrez	Tuxtla Gutiérrez International Airport	TGZ	Chiapas
Uruapan	Uruapan International Airport	UPN	Michoacán
Veracruz	Veracruz International Airport	VER	Veracruz
Villahermosa	Villahermosa International Airport	VSA	Tabasco
Zacatecas	Zacatecas International Airport	ZCL	Zacatecas

=== Saint Pierre and Miquelon ===
Location	Airport	IATA Code
Saint-Pierre	Saint-Pierre Airport	FSP

=== United States ===
Location	Airport	IATA Code	State
Akron	Akron Executive Airport	AKC	Ohio
Albany	Albany International Airport	ALB	New York
Albuquerque	Albuquerque International Sunport	ABQ	New Mexico
Amarillo	Rick Husband Amarillo International Airport	AMA	Texas
Anchorage	Anchorage International Airport	ANC	Alaska
Appleton	Appleton International Airport	ATW	Wisconsin
Atlanta	Hartsfield–Jackson Atlanta International Airport	ATL	Georgia
Atlantic City	Atlantic City International Airport	ACY	New Jersey
Austin (TX)	Austin–Bergstrom International Airport	AUS	Texas
Baltimore	Baltimore/Washington International Airport	BWI	Maryland
Bangor	Bangor International Airport	BGR	Maine
Baudette	Baudette International Airport	BDE	Minnesota
Bellingham	Bellingham International Airport	BLI	Washington
Birmingham	Birmingham–Shuttlesworth International Airport	BHM	Alabama
Boise	Boise Airport	BOI	Idaho
Boston	Logan International Airport	BOS	Massachusetts
Brownsville	Brownsville/South Padre Island International Airport	BRO	Texas
Buffalo	Buffalo Niagara International Airport	BUF	New York
Calexico	Calexico International Airport	CXL	California
Charlotte	Charlotte Douglas International Airport	CLT	North Carolina
Charleston (SC)	Charleston International Airport	CHS	South Carolina
Chicago	Midway International Airport	MDW	Illinois
Chicago	O'Hare International Airport	ORD	Illinois
Cincinnati (OH) (Hebron)	Cincinnati/Northern Kentucky International Airport	CVG	Kentucky
Cleveland	Cleveland Hopkins International Airport	CLE	Ohio
Columbia (SC)	Columbia Metropolitan Airport	CAE	South Carolina
Columbus (OH)	John Glenn Columbus International Airport	CMH	Ohio
Columbus (OH)	Rickenbacker International Airport	LCK	Ohio
Corpus Christi	Corpus Christi International Airport	CRP	Texas
Dallas	Dallas Love Field	DAL	Texas
Dallas/Fort Worth	Dallas/Fort Worth International Airport	DFW	Texas
Dayton (OH)	Dayton International Airport	DAY	Ohio
Denver	Denver International Airport	DEN	Colorado
Des Moines (IA)	Des Moines International Airport	DSM	Iowa
Detroit	Detroit Metropolitan Airport	DTW	Michigan
Duluth	Duluth International Airport	DLH	Minnesota
El Paso	El Paso International Airport	ELP	Texas
Erie	Erie International Airport	ERI	Pennsylvania
Fairbanks	Fairbanks International Airport	FAI	Alaska
Fort Lauderdale	Fort Lauderdale–Hollywood International Airport	FLL	Florida
Fort Myers	Southwest Florida International Airport	RSW	Florida
Fresno	Fresno Yosemite International Airport	FAT	California
Gary	Gary/Chicago International Airport	GYY	Indiana
Grand Rapids	Gerald R. Ford International Airport	GRR	Michigan
Green Bay	Green Bay–Austin Straubel International Airport	GRB	Wisconsin
Greensboro	Piedmont Triad International Airport	GSO	North Carolina
Greenville	Greenville-Spartanburg International Airport	GSP	South Carolina
Gulfport	Gulfport-Biloxi International Airport	GPT	Mississippi
Harlingen	Valley International Airport	HRL	Texas
Harrisburg	Harrisburg International Airport	MDT	Pennsylvania
Hartford (CT)	Bradley International Airport	BDL	Connecticut
Hilo	Hilo International Airport	ITO	Hawaii
Honolulu	Daniel K. Inouye International Airport	HNL	Hawaii
Houston	George Bush Intercontinental Airport	IAH	Texas
Houston	William P. Hobby Airport	HOU	Texas
Huntsville (AL)	Huntsville International Airport	HSV	Alabama
Indianapolis	Indianapolis International Airport	IND	Indiana
International Falls	Falls International Airport	INL	Minnesota
Jackson (MS)	Jackson–Medgar Wiley Evers International Airport	JAN	Mississippi
Jacksonville	Jacksonville International Airport	JAX	Florida
Juneau	Juneau International Airport	JNU	Alaska
Kailua-Kona	Kona International Airport	KOA	Hawaii
Kansas City (MO)	Kansas City International Airport	MCI	Missouri
Ketchikan	Ketchikan International Airport	KTN	Alaska
Key West	Key West International Airport	EYW	Florida
Kissimmee	Kissimmee Gateway Airport	ISM	Florida
Knoxville	McGhee Tyson Airport	TYS	Tennessee
Lakeland	Lakeland Linder International Airport	LAL	Florida
Lansing	Capital Region International Airport	LAN	Michigan
Las Vegas	Harry Reid International Airport	LAS	Nevada
Little Rock	Bill and Hillary Clinton National Airport	LIT	Arkansas
Los Angeles	Los Angeles International Airport	LAX	California
Louisville	Louisville International Airport	SDF	Kentucky
Lubbock	Lubbock Preston Smith International Airport	LBB	Texas
Madison (WI)	Dane County Regional Airport	MSN	Wisconsin
McAllen	McAllen Miller International Airport	MFE	Texas
Melbourne (FL)	Melbourne Orlando International Airport	MLB	Florida
Memphis	Memphis International Airport	MEM	Tennessee
Miami	Miami International Airport	MIA	Florida
Midland/Odessa	Midland International Air and Space Port	MAF	Texas
Milwaukee	General Mitchell International Airport	MKE	Wisconsin
Minneapolis/St. Paul	Minneapolis/St. Paul International Airport	MSP	Minnesota
Myrtle Beach	Myrtle Beach International Airport	MYR	South Carolina
Nashville	Nashville International Airport	BNA	Tennessee
New Orleans	Louis Armstrong New Orleans International Airport	MSY	Louisiana
New York City (Queens)	John F. Kennedy International Airport	JFK	New York
New York City (Queens)	LaGuardia Airport	LGA	New York
Newark	Newark Liberty International Airport	EWR	New Jersey
Newburgh	Stewart International Airport	SWF	New York
Newport News	Newport News/Williamsburg International Airport	PHF	Virginia
Niagara Falls	Niagara Falls International Airport	IAG	New York
Norfolk (VA)	Norfolk International Airport	ORF	Virginia
Oakland	Oakland International Airport	OAK	California
Oklahoma City	Will Rogers World Airport	OKC	Oklahoma
Omaha	Eppley Airfield	OMA	Nebraska
Ontario	Ontario International Airport	ONT	California
Orange County (CA)	John Wayne Airport	SNA	California
Orlando	Orlando International Airport	MCO	Florida
Palm Springs	Palm Springs International Airport	PSP	California
Panama City (FL)	Northwest Florida Beaches International Airport	ECP	Florida
Pensacola	Pensacola International Airport	PNS	Florida
Philadelphia	Philadelphia International Airport	PHL	Pennsylvania
Phoenix	Phoenix Sky Harbor International Airport	PHX	Arizona
Phoenix/Mesa	Phoenix–Mesa Gateway Airport	AZA	Arizona
Pittsburgh	Pittsburgh International Airport	PIT	Pennsylvania
Portland (ME)	Portland International Jetport	PWM	Maine
Portland (OR)	Portland International Airport	PDX	Oregon
Providence (Warwick)	Rhode Island T. F. Green International Airport	PVD	Rhode Island
Racine	Batten International Airport	RAC	Wisconsin
Raleigh/Durham	Raleigh–Durham International Airport	RDU	North Carolina
Reno	Reno–Tahoe International Airport	RNO	Nevada
Richmond (VA) (Sandston)	Richmond International Airport	RIC	Virginia
Rochester (MN)	Rochester International Airport	RST	Minnesota
Rochester (NY)	Greater Rochester International Airport	ROC	New York
Rockford (IL)	Chicago Rockford International Airport	RFD	Illinois
Sacramento	Sacramento International Airport	SMF	California
Salt Lake City	Salt Lake City International Airport	SLC	Utah
San Antonio	San Antonio International Airport	SAT	Texas
San Bernardino	San Bernardino International Airport	SBD	California
San Diego	San Diego International Airport	SAN	California
San Francisco	San Francisco International Airport	SFO	California
San Jose (CA)	San Jose International Airport	SJC	California
Sanford (FL)	Orlando Sanford International Airport	SFB	Florida
Sarasota/Bradenton	Sarasota–Bradenton International Airport	SRQ	Florida
Savannah (GA)	Savannah/Hilton Head International Airport	SAV	Georgia
Seattle	Kenmore Air Harbor Seaplane Base	LKE	Washington
Seattle	King County International Airport	BFI	Washington
Seattle	Seattle–Tacoma International Airport	SEA	Washington
Sheboygan	Sheboygan County Memorial Airport	SBM	Wisconsin
Everett (WA)	Paine Field	PAE	Washington
Spokane	Spokane International Airport	GEG	Washington
St. Louis	St. Louis Lambert International Airport	STL	Missouri
St. Petersburg (FL)	St. Pete–Clearwater International Airport	PIE	Florida
Syracuse	Syracuse Hancock International Airport	SYR	New York
Tallahassee	Tallahassee International Airport	TLH	Florida
Tampa	Tampa International Airport	TPA	Florida
Tucson	Tucson International Airport	TUS	Arizona
Tulsa	Tulsa International Airport	TUL	Oklahoma
Washington, D.C.	Ronald Reagan Washington National Airport**	DCA	Virginia
Washington, D.C.	Dulles International Airport	IAD	Virginia
West Palm Beach	President Donald J. Trump International Airport	PBI	Florida
Wilkes-Barre/Scranton	Wilkes-Barre/Scranton International Airport	AVP	Pennsylvania
Wilmington (NC)	Wilmington International Airport	ILM	North Carolina

**Reagan National does offer limited international flights to destinations such as Canada and Bermuda, but lacks an International Passenger Handling Facility operated by U.S. Customs. Therefore, it does serve international flights but does not meet the full definition of an international airport as it does not have the capability to process international passengers in a CBP processing facility.

=== Argentina ===
Location	Airport	IATA Code
Buenos Aires	Ministro Pistarini International Airport	EZE
Buenos Aires	Aeroparque Jorge Newbery	AEP
Bariloche	San Carlos de Bariloche Airport	BRC
Comodoro Rivadavia	General Enrique Mosconi International Airport	CRD
Córdoba	Ingeniero Aeronáutico Ambrosio L.V. Taravella International Airport	COR
Corrientes	Doctor Fernando Piragine Niveyro International Airport	CNQ
El Calafate	Comandante Armando Tola International Airport	FTE
El Palomar	El Palomar Airport	EPA
Esquel	Brigadier General Antonio Parodi International Airport	EQS
Formosa	Formosa International Airport	FMA
Mar del Plata	Ástor Piazzolla International Airport	MDQ
Mendoza	Governor Francisco Gabrielli International Airport	MDZ
Neuquén	Presidente Perón International Airport	NQN
Posadas	Libertador General José de San Martín Airport	PSS
Puerto Iguazú	Cataratas del Iguazú International Airport	IGR
Resistencia	Resistencia International Airport	RES
Río Gallegos	Piloto Civil Norberto Fernández International Airport	RGL
Río Grande	Hermes Quijada International Airport	RGA
Rosario	Rosario – Islas Malvinas International Airport	ROS
Salta	Martín Miguel de Güemes International Airport	SLA
San Miguel de Tucumán	Teniente Benjamín Matienzo International Airport	TUC
San Salvador de Jujuy	Gobernador Horacio Guzmán International Airport	JUJ
Santa Rosa del Conlara	Valle del Conlara Airport	RLO
Termas de Río Hondo	Termas de Río Hondo International Airport	RHD
Trelew	Almirante Marcos A. Zar Airport	REL
Ushuaia	Ushuaia – Malvinas Argentinas International Airport	USH

=== Bolivia ===
Location	Airport	IATA Code
La Paz	El Alto International Airport	LPB
Santa Cruz de la Sierra	Viru Viru International Airport	VVI
Cochabamba	Jorge Wilstermann International Airport	CBB

=== Brazil ===
Location	Airport	IATA Code
Aracaju	Santa Maria Airport	AJU
Belém	Val de Cães International Airport	BEL
Belo Horizonte	Tancredo Neves International Airport	CNF
Boa Vista	Boa Vista International Airport	BVB
Brasília	Brasília International Airport	BSB
Campinas	Viracopos International Airport	VCP
Campo Grande	Campo Grande International Airport	CGR
Cuiabá	Marechal Rondon International Airport	CGB
Curitiba	Afonso Pena International Airport	CWB
Florianópolis	Hercílio Luz International Airport	FLN
Fortaleza	Pinto Martins International Airport	FOR
Foz do Iguaçu	Foz do Iguaçu International Airport	IGU
Goiânia	Santa Genoveva Airport	GYN
João Pessoa	Presidente Castro Pinto International Airport	JPA
Maceió	Zumbi dos Palmares International Airport	MCZ
Manaus	Eduardo Gomes International Airport	MAO
Natal	Greater Natal International Airport	NAT
Petrolina	Petrolina Airport	PNZ
Porto Alegre	Salgado Filho Porto Alegre International Airport	POA
Porto Velho	Governador Jorge Teixeira de Oliveira International Airport	PVH
Recife	Guararapes International Airport	REC
Rio Branco	Rio Branco International Airport	RBR
Rio de Janeiro	Rio de Janeiro/Galeão International Airport	GIG
Rio de Janeiro	Santos Dumont Airport	SDU
Salvador	Deputado Luís Eduardo Magalhães International Airport	SSA
São Luís	Marechal Cunha Machado International Airport	SLZ
São Paulo	São Paulo–Congonhas Airport	CGH
São Paulo	São Paulo/Guarulhos International Airport	GRU
Teresina	Teresina Airport	THE
Uberlândia	Uberlândia Airport	UDI
Vitória	Eurico de Aguiar Salles Airport	VIX

=== Chile ===
Location	Airport	IATA Code
Antofagasta	Andrés Sabella Gálvez International Airport	ANF
Concepción	Carriel Sur International Airport	CCP
Puerto Montt	El Tepual International Airport	PMC
Punta Arenas	Presidente Carlos Ibáñez del Campo International Airport	PUQ
Santiago	Arturo Merino Benítez International Airport	SCL

=== Colombia ===
Location	Airport	IATA Code
Armenia	El Edén International Airport	AXM
Barranquilla	Ernesto Cortissoz International Airport	BAQ
Bogotá	El Dorado International Airport	BOG
Bucaramanga	Palonegro International Airport	BGA
Buenaventura	Gerardo Tobar López Airport	BUN
Cali	Alfonso Bonilla Aragón International Airport	CLO
Cartagena	Rafael Núñez International Airport	CTG
Cúcuta	Camilo Daza International Airport	CUC
Ibagué	Perales Airport	IBE
Ipiales	San Luis Airport	IPI
Florencia	Gustavo Artunduaga Paredes Airport	FLA
Leticia	Alfredo Vásquez Cobo International Airport	LET
Maicao	Jorge Isaacs Airport	MCJ
Manizales	La Nubia Airport	MZL
Medellín	José María Córdova International Airport	MDE
Mitú	Fabio Alberto León Bentley Airport	MVP
Montería	Los Garzones Airport	MTR
Neiva	Benito Salas Airport	NVA
Pasto	Antonio Nariño Airport	PSO
Pereira	Matecaña International Airport	PEI
Popayán	Guillermo León Valencia Airport	PPN
Providence Island	El Embrujo Airport	PVA
Quibdó	El Caraño Airport	UIB
Riohacha	Almirante Padilla Airport	RCH
San Andrés	Gustavo Rojas Pinilla International Airport	ADZ
Tolú	Golfo de Morrosquillo Airport	TLU
Tumaco	La Florida Airport	TCO
Santa Marta	Simón Bolívar International Airport	SMR
Sincelejo	Las Brujas Airport	CZU
Valledupar	Alfonso López Pumarejo Airport	VUP
Villavicencio	La Vanguardia Airport	VVC
Yopal	El Alcaraván Airport	EYP

=== Ecuador ===
Location	Airport	IATA Code
Cuenca	Mariscal Lamar International Airport	CUE
Esmeraldas	Carlos Concha Torres International Airport	ESM
Guayaquil	José Joaquín de Olmedo International Airport	GYE
Machala	Santa Rosa International Airport	ETR
Manta	Eloy Alfaro International Airport	MEC
Quito	Mariscal Sucre International Airport	UIO
Tulcán	Teniente Coronel Luis a Mantilla International Airport	TUA

=== Falkland Islands ===
Location	Airport	IATA Code
Mount Pleasant	RAF Mount Pleasant	MPN

=== French Guiana ===
Location	Airport	IATA Code
Cayenne	Cayenne – Félix Eboué Airport	CAY

=== Guyana ===
Location	Airport	IATA Code
Georgetown	Cheddi Jagan International Airport	GEO

=== Paraguay ===
Location	Airport	IATA Code
Asunción	Silvio Pettirossi International Airport	ASU
Ciudad del Este	Guaraní International Airport	AGT

=== Peru ===
Location	Airport	IATA Code
Arequipa	Rodríguez Ballón International Airport	AQP
Chiclayo	José Quiñones González International Airport	CIX
Cusco	Alejandro Velasco Astete International Airport	CUZ
Lima	Jorge Chávez International Airport	LIM
Trujillo	Carlos Martínez de Pinillos International Airport	TRU

=== Suriname ===
Location	Airport	IATA Code
Paramaribo	Johan Adolf Pengel International Airport	PBM

=== Uruguay ===
Location	Airport	IATA Code
Montevideo	Carrasco International Airport	MVD
Punta del Este	Capitán de Corbeta Carlos A. Curbelo International Airport	PDP
Rivera	Rivera International Airport	RVY

=== Venezuela ===
Location	Airport	IATA Code
Caracas	Simón Bolívar International Airport	CCS
Maracaibo	La Chinita International Airport	MAR
Valencia	Arturo Michelena International Airport	VLN

== Asia ==
=== Central Asia ===
==== Kazakhstan ====
Location	Airport	IATA Code
Aktau	Aktau Airport	SCO
Aktobe	Aktobe International Airport	AKX
Almaty	Almaty International Airport	ALA
Astana	Nursultan Nazarbayev International Airport	NQZ
Atyrau	Atyrau Airport	GUW
Karaganda	Karaganda Airport	KGF
Kokshetau	Kokshetau Airport	KOV
Kostanay	Kostanay Airport	KSN
Kyzylorda	Kyzylorda Airport	KZO
Oral	Oral Ak Zhol Airport	URA
Oskemen	Oskemen Airport	UKK
Pavlodar	Pavlodar Airport	PWQ
Petropavl	Petropavl Airport	PPK
Semey	Semey Airport	PLX
Şymkent	Şymkent International Airport	CIT
Taraz	Taraz Airport	DMB

==== Kyrgyzstan ====
Location	Airport	IATA Code	ICAO Code
Bishkek	Manas International Airport	FRU	UCFM
Issyk-Kul	Issyk-Kul International Airport	IKU	UCFL
Karakol	Karakol International Airport	IKG	UCFP
Osh	Osh Airport	OSS	UCFO

==== Tajikistan ====
Location	Airport	IATA Code
Bokhtar	Bokhtar International Airport	KQT
Dushanbe	Dushanbe Airport	DYU
Khujand	Khujand Airport	LBD
Kulob	Kulob Airport	TJU

==== Turkmenistan ====
Location	Airport	IATA Code
Ashgabat	Ashgabat Airport	ASB
Daşoguz	Daşoguz Airport	TAZ
Mary	Mary International Airport	MYP
Türkmenabat	Turkmenabat International Airport	CRZ
Turkmenbashi	Turkmenbashi International Airport	KRW

==== Uzbekistan ====
Location	Airport	IATA Code
Andijan	Andizhan Airport	AZN
Bukhara	Bukhara International Airport	BHK
Fergana	Fergana International Airport	FEG
Qarshi	Karshi Airport	KSQ
Namangan	Namangan Airport	NMA
Navoiy	Navoiy International Airport	NVI
Nukus	Nukus Airport	NCU
Samarkand	Samarkand International Airport	SKD
Tashkent	Islam Karimov Tashkent International Airport	TAS
Termez	Termez Airport	TMJ
Urgench	Urgench International Airport	UGC

=== Eastern Asia ===
==== China ====
Location	Airport	IATA Code
Baotou	Baotou Donghe international Airport	BAV
Beihai	Beihai Fucheng Airport	BHY
Beijing	Beijing Capital International Airport	PEK
Beijing	Beijing Daxing International Airport	PKX
Changchun	Changchun Longjia International Airport	CGQ
Changsha	Changsha Huanghua International Airport	CSX
Changzhou	Changzhou Benniu International Airport	CZX
Chengdu	Chengdu Shuangliu International Airport	CTU
Chengdu	Chengdu Tianfu International Airport	TFU
Chongqing	Chongqing Jiangbei International Airport	CKG
Dalian	Dalian Zhoushuizi International Airport	DLC
Dandong	Dandong Langtou Airport	DDG
Datong	Datong Yungang Airport	DAT
Dunhuang	Dunhuang Mogao International Airport	DNH
Enshi City	Enshi Xujiaping Airport	ENH
Fuzhou	Fuzhou Changle International Airport	FOC
Ganzhou	Ganzhou Huangjin Airport	KOW
Guangzhou	Guangzhou Baiyun International Airport	CAN
Guilin	Guilin Liangjiang International Airport	KWL
Guiyang	Guiyang Longdongbao International Airport	KWE
Haikou	Haikou Meilan International Airport	HAK
Hangzhou	Hangzhou Xiaoshan International Airport	HGH
Harbin	Harbin Taiping International Airport	HRB
Hefei	Hefei Xinqiao International Airport	HFE
Heihe	Heihe Aihui Airport	HEK
Hohhot	Hohhot Baita International Airport	HET
Huai'an	Huai'an Lianshui International Airport	HIA
Huangshan City	Huangshan Tunxi International Airport	TXN
Hulunbuir	Hulunbuir Hailar Airport	HLD
Jiamusi	Jiamusi Dongjiao Airport	JMU
Jieyang	Jieyang Chaoshan International Airport	SWA
Jinan	Jinan Yaoqiang International Airport	TNA
Kunming	Kunming Changshui International Airport	KMG
Lanzhou	Lanzhou Zhongchuan International Airport	LHW
Lhasa	Lhasa Gonggar Airport	LXA
Lianyungang	Lianyungang Baitabu Airport	LYG
Lijiang	Lijiang Sanyi International Airport	LJG
Linyi	Linyi Qiyang Airport	LYI
Luoyang	Luoyang Beijiao Airport	LYA
Mangshi	Dehong Mangshi Airport	LUM
Manzhouli	Manzhouli Xijiao Airport	NZH
Mudanjiang	Mudanjiang Hailang International Airport	MDG
Nanchang	Nanchang Changbei International Airport	KHN
Nanjing	Nanjing Lukou International Airport	NKG
Nanning	Nanning Wuxu International Airport	NNG
Nantong	Nantong Xingdong International Airport	NTG
Ningbo	Ningbo Lishe International Airport	NGB
Ordos City	Ordos Ejin Horo International Airport	DSN
Qingdao	Qingdao Jiaodong International Airport	TAO
Qinhuangdao	Qinhuangdao Beidaihe Airport	BPE
Qionghai	Qionghai Bo'ao International Airport	BAR
Qiqihar	Qiqihar Sanjiazi Airport	NDG
Quanzhou	Quanzhou Jinjiang International Airport	JJN
Sanya	Sanya Phoenix International Airport	SYX
Shanghai	Shanghai Hongqiao International Airport	SHA
Shanghai	Shanghai Pudong International Airport	PVG
Shenyang	Shenyang Taoxian International Airport	SHE
Shenzhen	Shenzhen Bao'an International Airport	SZX
Shijiazhuang	Shijiazhuang Zhengding International Airport	SJW
Taiyuan	Taiyuan Wusu International Airport	TYN
Tianjin	Tianjin Binhai International Airport	TSN
Ulanqab	Ulanqab Jining Airport	UCB
Ürümqi	Ürümqi Diwopu International Airport	URC
Wanzhou	Wanzhou Wuqiao Airport	WXN
Weihai	Weihai Dashuibo Airport	WEH
Wenzhou	Wenzhou Yongqiang Airport	WNZ
Wuhan	Wuhan Tianhe International Airport	WUH
Wuxi	Sunan Shuofang International Airport	WUX
Wuyishan	Wuyishan Airport	WUS
Xiamen	Xiamen Gaoqi International Airport	XMN
Xi'an	Xi'an Xianyang International Airport	XIY
Xining	Xining Caojiabao International Airport	XNN
Xinzhou	Xinzhou Wutaishan Airport	WUT
Xishuangbanna	Xishuangbanna Gasa International Airport	JHG
Xuzhou	Xuzhou Guanyin Airport	XUZ
Yancheng	Yancheng Nanyang Airport	YNZ
Yangzhou	Yangzhou Taizhou International Airport	YTY
Yanji	Yanji Airport	YNJ
Yantai	Yantai Penglai International Airport	YNT
Yichang	Yichang Sanxia Airport	YIH
Yinchuan	Yinchuan Hedong International Airport	INC
Yiwu	Yiwu Airport	YIW
Yuncheng	Yuncheng Guangong Airport	YCU
Zhangjiajie	Zhangjiajie Hehua Airport	DYG
Zhanjiang	Zhanjiang Wuchuan Airport	ZHA
Zhengzhou	Zhengzhou Xinzheng International Airport	CGO
Zhuhai	Zhuhai Jinwan Airport	ZUH
Zunyi	Zunyi Xinzhou Airport	ZYI

==== Hong Kong ====
Location	Airport	IATA Code
Chek Lap Kok	Hong Kong International Airport	HKG

==== Japan ====
Location	Airport	IATA Code
Akita	Akita Airport	AXT
Aomori	Aomori Airport	AOJ
Fukuoka	Fukuoka Airport	FUK
Hakodate	Hakodate Airport	HKD
Hiroshima	Hiroshima Airport	HIJ
Kagoshima	Kagoshima Airport	KOJ
Kitakyushu	Kitakyushu Airport	KKJ
Komatsu	Komatsu Airport	KMQ
Nagasaki	Nagasaki Airport	NGS
Nagoya	Chubu Centrair International Airport	NGO
Naha	Naha Airport	OKA
Niigata	Niigata Airport	KIJ
Ōita	Oita Airport	OIT
Okayama	Okayama Airport	OKJ
Osaka	Kansai International Airport	KIX
Sapporo	New Chitose Airport	CTS
Sendai	Sendai Airport	SDJ
Shizuoka	Shizuoka Airport	FSZ
Tokyo	Haneda Airport	HND
Tokyo	Narita International Airport	NRT

==== Macau ====
Location	Airport	IATA Code
Taipa	Macau International Airport	MFM

==== Mongolia ====
Location	Airport	IATA Code
Ölgii	Ölgii International Airport	ULG
Ulaanbaatar	Chinggis Khaan International Airport	UBN

==== North Korea ====
Location	Airport	IATA Code
Pyongyang	Pyongyang International Airport	FNJ

==== South Korea ====
Location	Airport	IATA Code
Busan	Gimhae International Airport	PUS
Cheongju	Cheongju International Airport	CJJ
Daegu	Daegu International Airport	TAE
Jeju	Jeju International Airport	CJU
Muan	Muan International Airport	MWX
Seoul	Gimpo International Airport	GMP
Seoul	Incheon International Airport	ICN
Yangyang	Yangyang International Airport	YNY

==== Taiwan ====
Location	Airport	IATA Code
Hualien City	Hualien Airport	HUN
Kaohsiung	Kaohsiung International Airport	KHH
Taichung	Taichung International Airport	RMQ
Tainan	Tainan Airport	TNN
Taipei	Taipei Songshan Airport	TSA
Taipei	Taoyuan International Airport	TPE

=== Southern Asia ===
==== Bangladesh ====
Location	Airport	IATA Code
Barishal	Barisal Airport	BZL
Chittagong	Shah Amanat International Airport	CGP
Cox's Bazar	Cox's Bazar International Airport	CXB
Dhaka	Hazrat Shahjalal International Airport	DAC
Khulna	Khan Jahan Ali Airport (Not yet functional)	KLN
Rajshahi	Shah Makhdum Airport	RJH
Rangpur	Saidpur Airport	SPD
Sylhet	Osmani International Airport	ZYL

==== Bhutan ====
Location	Airport	IATA Code
Paro	Paro International Airport	PBH

==== India ====
Location	Airport	IATA Code	State/Union Territory
Agartala	Maharaja Bir Bikram Airport	IXA	Tripura
Ahmedabad	Sardar Vallabhbhai Patel International Airport	AMD	Gujarat
Amritsar	Sri Guru Ram Das Ji International Airport	ATQ	PunjabFGN
Ayodhya	Maharishi Valmiki International Airport, Ayodhya Dham	AYJ	Uttar Pradesh
Bengaluru	Kempegowda International Airport	BLR	Karnataka
Bhopal	Raja Bhoj Airport	BHO	Madhya Pradesh
Bhubaneswar	Biju Patnaik International Airport	BBI	Odisha
Chennai	Chennai International Airport	MAA	Tamil Nadu
Coimbatore	Coimbatore International Airport	CJB	Tamil Nadu
Delhi NCR	Indira Gandhi International Airport	DEL	Delhi
Durgapur	Kazi Nazrul Islam Airport	RDP	West Bengal
Gaya	Gaya Airport	GAY	Bihar
Guwahati	Lokpriya Gopinath Bordoloi International Airport	GAU	Assam
Hyderabad	Rajiv Gandhi International Airport	HYD	Telangana
Imphal	Imphal Airport	IMF	Manipur
Indore	Devi Ahilya Bai Holkar Airport	IDR	Madhya Pradesh
Jaipur	Jaipur International Airport	JAI	Rajasthan
Jammu	Jammu Airport	IXJ	Jammu and Kashmir
Kannur	Kannur International Airport	CNN	Kerala
Kochi	Cochin International Airport	COK	Kerala
Kolkata	Netaji Subhas Chandra Bose International Airport	CCU	West Bengal
Kozhikode	Calicut International Airport	CCJ	Kerala
Lucknow	Chaudhary Charan Singh International Airport	LKO	Uttar Pradesh
Madurai	Madurai Airport	IXM	Tamil Nadu
Mangaluru	Mangaluru International Airport	IXE	Karnataka
Mumbai	Chhatrapati Shivaji Maharaj International Airport	BOM	Maharashtra
Nagpur	Dr. Babasaheb Ambedkar International Airport	NAG	Maharashtra
Nashik	Nashik Airport	ISK	Maharashtra
Navi Mumbai	Navi Mumbai International Airport	NMI	Maharashtra
Noida (Delhi NCR)	Noida International Airport	DXN	Uttar Pradesh
North Goa	Manohar International Airport	GOX	Goa
Pune	Pune Airport	PNQ	Maharashtra
Ranchi	Birsa Munda Airport	IXR	Jharkhand
Siliguri	Bagdogra International Airport	IXB	West Bengal
South Goa	Dabolim Airport	GOI	Goa
Srinagar	Srinagar Airport	SXR	Jammu and Kashmir
Surat	Surat Airport	STV	Gujarat
Thiruvananthapuram	Trivandrum International Airport	TRV	Kerala
Tiruchirappalli	Tiruchirappalli International Airport	TRZ	Tamil Nadu
Tirupati	Tirupati International Airport	TIR	Andhra Pradesh
Vadodara	Vadodara Airport	BDQ	Gujarat
Varanasi	Lal Bahadur Shastri Airport	VNS	Uttar Pradesh
Vijayawada	Vijayawada International Airport	VGA	Andhra Pradesh
Visakhapatnam	Visakhapatnam International Airport	VTZ	Andhra Pradesh

==== Maldives ====
Location	Airport	IATA Code
Addu City	Gan International Airport	GAN
Hanimaadhoo	Hanimaadhoo International Airport	HAQ
Malé	Velana International Airport	MLE
Maafaru	Maafaru International Airport	NMF
Maamigili	Villa International Airport Maamigili	VAM

==== Nepal ====
Location	Airport	IATA Code
Kathmandu	Tribhuvan International Airport	KTM
Pokhara	Pokhara Regional International Airport	PKR
Siddharthanagar	Gautam Buddha International Airport	BWA

==== Pakistan ====
Location	Airport	IATA Code
Bahawalpur	Bahawalpur Airport	BHV
Faisalabad	Faisalabad International Airport	LYP
Gwadar	Gwadar International Airport	GWD
Islamabad	Islamabad International Airport	ISB
Karachi	Jinnah International Airport	KHI
Lahore	Allama Iqbal International Airport	LHE
Multan	Multan International Airport	MUX
Peshawar	Bacha Khan International Airport	PEW
Quetta	Quetta International Airport	UET
Rahim Yar Khan	Shaikh Zayed International Airport	RYK
Sialkot	Sialkot International Airport	SKT
Turbat	Turbat International Airport	TUK

==== Sri Lanka ====
Location	Airport	IATA Code
Batticaloa	Batticaloa International Airport	BTC
Colombo	Bandaranaike International Airport	CMB
Colombo	Ratmalana Airport	RML
Hambantota	Mattala Rajapaksa International Airport	HRI
Jaffna	Jaffna International Airport	JAF

=== Southeast Asia ===
==== Brunei ====
Location	Airport	IATA Code
Bandar Seri Begawan	Brunei International Airport	BWN

==== Cambodia ====
Location	Airport	IATA Code
Phnom Penh	Techo International Airport	KTI
Phnom Penh	Phnom Penh International Airport	PNH
Siem Reap	Siem Reap International Airport	REP
Sihanoukville	Sihanouk International Airport	KOS

==== Indonesia ====
Location	Airport	IATA Code
Ambon	Pattimura International Airport	AMQ
Balikpapan	Sultan Aji Muhammad Sulaiman Sepinggan International Airport	BPN
Banda Aceh	Sultan Iskandar Muda International Airport	BTJ
Bandar Lampung	Radin Inten II International Airport	TKG
Bandung	Kertajati International Airport	KJT
Banjarmasin	Syamsudin Noor International Airport	BDJ
Batam	Hang Nadim International Airport	BTH
Denpasar	I Gusti Ngurah Rai International Airport	DPS
Jakarta	Halim Perdanakusuma International Airport	HLP
Jakarta	Soekarno–Hatta International Airport	CGK
Jayapura	Sentani International Airport	DJJ
Labuan Bajo	Komodo International Airport	LBJ
Makassar	Sultan Hasanuddin International Airport	UPG
Manado	Sam Ratulangi International Airport	MDC
Mataram	Lombok International Airport	LOP
Medan	Kualanamu International Airport	KNO
Padang	Minangkabau International Airport	PDG
Palembang	Sultan Mahmud Badaruddin II International Airport	PLM
Pekanbaru	Sultan Syarif Kasim II International Airport	PKU
Pontianak	Supadio International Airport	PNK
Samarinda	Aji Pangeran Tumenggung Pranoto International Airport	AAP
Semarang	Jenderal Ahmad Yani International Airport	SRG
Sorong	Domine Eduard Osok International Airport	SOQ
Surabaya	Juanda International Airport	SUB
Surakarta	Adisoemarmo International Airport	SOC
Tanjungpandan	H.A.S. Hanandjoeddin International Airport	TJQ
Yogyakarta	Yogyakarta International Airport	YIA

==== Laos ====
Location	Airport	IATA Code
Bokeo (Tonpheung district)	Bokeo International Airport	BOR
Luang Prabang	Luang Prabang International Airport	LPQ
Pakse	Pakse International Airport	PKZ
Savannakhet	Savannakhet Airport	ZVK
Vientiane	Wattay International Airport	VTE

==== Malaysia ====
Location	Airport	IATA Code
Alor Setar	Sultan Abdul Halim Airport	AOR
Ipoh	Sultan Azlan Shah Airport	IPH
Johor Bahru	Senai International Airport	JHB
Kota Bharu	Sultan Ismail Petra Airport	KBR
Kota Kinabalu	Kota Kinabalu International Airport	BKI
Kuala Lumpur	Kuala Lumpur International Airport	KUL
Kuala Lumpur	Sultan Abdul Aziz Shah Airport	SZB
Kuala Terengganu	Sultan Mahmud Airport	TGG
Kuantan	Sultan Haji Ahmad Shah Airport	KUA
Kuching	Kuching International Airport	KCH
Labuan	Labuan International Airport	LBU
Langkawi	Langkawi International Airport	LGK
Penang	Penang International Airport	PEN

==== Myanmar ====
Location	Airport	IATA Code
Mandalay	Mandalay International Airport	MDL
Nay Pyi Taw	Naypyidaw International Airport	NYT
Yangon	Yangon International Airport	RGN

==== Philippines ====
Location	Airport	IATA Code
Daraga	Bicol International Airport	DRP
Cagayan	Cagayan North International Airport	LLC
Lapu-Lapu City	Mactan–Cebu International Airport	CEB
Angeles City	Clark International Airport	CRK
Davao City	Francisco Bangoy International Airport	DVO
General Santos	General Santos International Airport	GES
Iloilo City	Iloilo International Airport	ILO
Kalibo	Kalibo International Airport	KLO
Laguindingan	Laguindingan International Airport	CGY
Laoag	Laoag International Airport	LAO
Manila	Ninoy Aquino International Airport	MNL
Panglao Island	Bohol–Panglao International Airport	TAG
Puerto Princesa	Puerto Princesa International Airport	PPS
Olongapo	Subic Bay International Airport	SFS
Zamboanga City	Zamboanga International Airport	ZAM

==== Singapore ====
Location	Airport	IATA Code
Singapore	Changi Airport	SIN
Singapore	Seletar Airport	XSP

==== Thailand ====
Location	Airport	IATA Code
Bangkok	Suvarnabhumi Airport	BKK
Bangkok	Don Mueang International Airport	DMK
Chiang Mai	Chiang Mai International Airport	CNX
Chiang Rai	Chiang Rai International Airport	CEI
Hat Yai	Hat Yai International Airport	HDY
Ko Samui	Samui Airport	USM
Krabi	Krabi International Airport	KBV
Phuket	Phuket International Airport	HKT
Rayong/Pattaya	U-Tapao International Airport	UTP
Surat Thani	Surat Thani International Airport	URT
Udon Thani	Udon Thani International Airport	UTH

==== Timor-Leste ====
Location	Airport	IATA Code
Dili	Presidente Nicolau Lobato International Airport	DIL

==== Vietnam ====
Location	Airport	IATA Code
Cần Thơ	Can Tho International Airport	VCA
Đà Nẵng	Da Nang International Airport	DAD
Hải Phòng	Cat Bi International Airport	HPH
Hà Nội	Noi Bai International Airport	HAN
Ho Chi Minh City	Tan Son Nhat International Airport	SGN
Huế	Phu Bai International Airport	HUI
Nha Trang	Cam Ranh International Airport	CXR
Phú Quốc	Phu Quoc International Airport	PQC
Quảng Nam	Chu Lai Airport	VCL
Vân Đồn	Van Don International Airport	VDO

=== Southwest Asia and the Middle East ===
==== Afghanistan ====
Location	Airport	IATA Code
Herat	Herat International Airport	HEA
Kabul	Kabul International Airport	KBL
Kandahar	Kandahar International Airport	KDH
Mazar-i-Sharif	Mazar-i-Sharif International Airport	MZR

==== Armenia ====
Location	Airport	IATA Code
Gyumri	Gyumri Shirak International Airport	LWN
Kapan	Syunik Airport	YUK
Yerevan	Zvartnots International Airport	EVN

==== Azerbaijan ====
Location	Airport	IATA Code
Baku	Heydar Aliyev International Airport	GYD
Fuzuli	Fuzuli International Airport	FZL
Ganja	Ganja International Airport	KVD
Lachin	Lachin International Airport	LHL
Lankaran	Lankaran International Airport	LLK
Nakhchivan	Nakhchivan Airport	NAJ
Qabala	Qabala International Airport	GBB
Zangilan	Zangilan International Airport	ZZE
Zaqatala	Zaqatala International Airport	ZTU

==== Bahrain ====
Location	Airport	IATA Code
Manama	Bahrain International Airport	BAH

==== Cyprus ====
Location	Airport	IATA Code
Larnaca	Larnaca International Airport	LCA
North Nicosia	Ercan International Airport	ECN
Paphos	Paphos International Airport	PFO

==== Georgia ====
Location	Airport	IATA Code
Batumi	Batumi International Airport	BUS
Kutaisi	Kutaisi International Airport	KUT
Sokhumi	Sukhumi Babushara Airport	SUI
Tbilisi	Tbilisi International Airport	TBS

==== Iran ====
Location	Airport	IATA Code
Abadan	Abadan International Airport	ABD
Ahvaz	Ahvaz International Airport	AWZ
Arak	Arak International Airport	AJK
Ardabil	Ardabil Airport	ADU
Asaluyeh	Persian Gulf Airport	PGU
Bandar Abbas	Bandar Abbas International Airport	BND
Birjand	Birjand International Airport	XBJ
Bushehr	Bushehr Airport	BUZ
Gorgan	Gorgan International Airport	GBT
Hamadan	Hamadan International Airport	HDM
Ilam	Ilam Airport	IIL
Isfahan	Isfahan International Airport	IFN
Kerman	Ayatollah Hashemi Rafsanjani Airport	KER
Kermanshah	Shahid Ashrafi Esfahani Airport	KSH
Kish Island	Kish Airport	KIH
Konarak	Chabahar Konarak Airport	ZBR
Lamerd	Lamerd Airport	LFM
Lar	Larestan International Airport	LRR
Mashhad	Mashhad International Airport	MHD
Qeshm Island	Qeshm International Airport	GSM
Rasht	Rasht Airport	RAS
Sari	Dasht-e Naz Airport	SRY
Shiraz	Shiraz International Airport	SYZ
Tabriz	Tabriz International Airport	TBZ
Tehran	Imam Khomeini International Airport	IKA
Tehran	Mehrabad International Airport	THR
Urmia	Urmia Airport	OMH
Yazd	Shahid Sadooghi Airport	AZD
Zahedan	Zahedan Airport	ZAH

==== Iraq ====
Location	Airport	IATA Code
Al Najaf	Al Najaf International Airport	NJF
Baghdad	Baghdad International Airport	BGW
Basra	Basra International Airport	BSR
Erbil	Erbil International Airport	EBL
Mosul	Mosul International Airport	OSM
Nasiriyah	Nasiriyah Airport	XNH
Sulaymaniyah	Sulaimaniyah International Airport	ISU

==== Israel ====
Location	Airport	IATA Code
Eilat	Ramon Airport	ETM
Haifa	Haifa Airport	HFA
Tel Aviv	Ben Gurion Airport	TLV

==== Jordan ====
Location	Airport	IATA Code
Aqaba	King Hussein International Airport	AQJ
Amman	Queen Alia International Airport	AMM

==== Kuwait ====
Location	Airport	IATA Code
Kuwait City	Kuwait International Airport	KWI

==== Lebanon ====
Location	Airport	IATA Code
Beirut	Beirut–Rafic Hariri International Airport	BEY

==== Oman ====
Location	Airport	IATA Code
Muscat	Muscat International Airport	MCT
Salalah	Salalah International Airport	SLL
Sohar	Sohar International Airport	OHS

==== Qatar ====
Location	Airport	IATA Code
Doha	Hamad International Airport	DOH

==== Saudi Arabia ====
Location	Airport	IATA Code
Abha	Abha International Airport	AHB
Al-Ahsa	Al-Ahsa International Airport	HOF
Al-Jawf	Al Jawf International Airport	AJF
Al-Ula	Al-Ula International Airport	ULH
Buraydah	Prince Naif bin Abdulaziz International Airport	ELQ
Dammam	King Fahd International Airport	DMM
Hafar al-Batin	Al Qaisumah International Airport	AQI
Ha'il	Ha'il International Airport	HAS
Hanak	Red Sea International Airport	RSI
Jeddah	King Abdulaziz International Airport	JED
Jizan	King Abdullah bin Abdulaziz International Airport	GIZ
Medina	Prince Mohammad bin Abdulaziz International Airport	MED
Najran	Najran Domestic Airport	EAM
Neom	Neom Bay Airport	NUM
Riyadh	King Khalid International Airport	RUH
Tabuk	Prince Sultan bin Abdulaziz Airport	TUU
Ta'if	Taif International Airport	TIF
Yanbu	Yanbu Airport	YNB

==== Syria ====
Location	Airport	IATA Code
Aleppo	Aleppo International Airport	ALP
Damascus	Damascus International Airport	DAM
Latakia	Latakia International Airport	LTK
Qamishli	Qamishli Airport	KAC

==== Turkey ====
Location	Airport	IATA Code
Adana	Şakirpaşa Airport	ADA
Alanya	Gazipaşa Airport	GZP
Ankara	Esenboğa International Airport	ESB
Antalya	Antalya Airport	AYT
Bodrum	Milas–Bodrum Airport	BJV
Bursa	Yenişehir Airport	YEI
Dalaman	Dalaman Airport	DLM
Denizli	Denizli Çardak Airport	DNZ
Diyarbakır	Diyarbakır Airport	DIY
Elazığ	Elazığ Airport	EZS
Gaziantep	Oğuzeli Airport	GZT
Istanbul	Istanbul Airport	IST
Istanbul	Sabiha Gökçen International Airport	SAW
İzmir	Adnan Menderes Airport	ADB
Kayseri	Erkilet Airport	ASR
Konya	Konya Airport	KYA
Kütahya	Zafer Airport	KZR
Malatya	Erhaç Airport	MLX
Nevşehir	Kapadokya Airport	NAV
Samsun	Samsun-Çarşamba Airport	SZF
Trabzon	Trabzon Airport	TZX
Zonguldak	Zonguldak Airport	ONQ

==== United Arab Emirates ====
Location	Airport	IATA Code
Abu Dhabi	Abu Dhabi International Airport	AUH
Al Ain	Al Ain International Airport	AAN
Dubai	Al Maktoum International Airport	DWC
Dubai	Dubai International Airport	DXB
Ras Al Khaimah	Ras Al Khaimah International Airport	RKT
Sharjah	Sharjah International Airport	SHJ

==== Yemen ====
Location	Airport	IATA Code
Aden	Aden International Airport	ADE
Mukalla	Riyan International Airport	RIY
Sanaa	Sanaa International Airport	SAH
Seiyun	Seiyun Airport	GXF
Socotra	Socotra Airport	SCT

== Europe ==
=== Western Europe ===
==== Benelux ====
Belgium
Location	Airport	IATA Code
Antwerp	Antwerp International Airport	ANR
Brussels	Brussels Airport	BRU
Charleroi	Brussels South Charleroi Airport	CRL
Liège	Liège Airport	LGG
Ostend/Bruges	Ostend–Bruges International Airport	OST

Netherlands
Location	Airport	IATA Code
Amsterdam	Amsterdam Airport	AMS
Eindhoven	Eindhoven Airport	EIN
Groningen	Groningen Airport Eelde	GRQ
Maastricht	Maastricht Aachen Airport	MST
Rotterdam	Rotterdam The Hague Airport	RTM

Luxembourg
Location	Airport	IATA Code
Luxembourg City	Luxembourg Airport	LUX

==== France ====
Location	Airport	IATA Code
Ajaccio	Ajaccio Napoleon Bonaparte Airport	AJA
Bastia	Poretta Airport	BIA
Beauvais	Beauvais–Tillé Airport	BVA
Bergerac	Bergerac Dordogne Périgord Airport	EGC
Béziers	Béziers Cap d'Agde Airport	BZR
Biarritz	Biarritz Pays Basque Airport	BIQ
Bordeaux	Bordeaux–Mérignac Airport	BOD
Brest	Brest Bretagne Airport	BES
Carcassonne	Carcassonne Airport	CCF
Châlons-en-Champagne	Châlons Vatry Airport	XCR
Chambéry	Chambéry Airport	CMF
Dinard	Dinard–Pleurtuit–Saint-Malo Airport	DNR
Figari	Figari–Sud Corse Airport	FSC
Grenoble	Alpes–Isère Airport	GNB
La Rochelle	La Rochelle – Île de Ré Airport	LRH
Lille	Lille Airport	LIL
Limoges	Limoges – Bellegarde Airport	LIG
Lyon	Lyon–Saint-Exupéry Airport	LYS
Marseille	Marseille Provence Airport	MRS
Mulhouse	EuroAirport Basel Mulhouse Freiburg	BSL/MLH/EAP
Nantes	Nantes Atlantique Airport	NTE
Nice	Nice Côte d'Azur Airport	NCE
Nîmes	Nîmes–Alès–Camargue–Cévennes Airport	FNI
Paris	Charles de Gaulle Airport	CDG
Paris	Orly Airport	ORY
Pau	Pau Pyrénées Airport	PUF
Perpignan	Perpignan–Rivesaltes Airport	PGF
Poitiers	Poitiers–Biard Airport	PIS
Rodez	Rodez–Aveyron Airport	RDZ
Saint-Étienne	Saint-Étienne–Bouthéon Airport	EBU
Strasbourg	Strasbourg Airport	SXB
Toulon	Toulon–Hyères Airport	TLN
Toulouse	Toulouse–Blagnac Airport	TLS
Tours	Tours Val de Loire Airport	TUF

==== Ireland ====
Location	Airport	IATA Code
Cork	Cork Airport	ORK
Dublin	Dublin Airport	DUB
Kerry	Kerry Airport	KIR
Knock	Ireland West Airport	NOC
Shannon	Shannon Airport	SNN

==== United Kingdom ====
England
Location	Airport	IATA Code
Birmingham	Birmingham Airport	BHX
Bournemouth	Bournemouth Airport	BOH
Bristol	Bristol Airport	BRS
Exeter	Exeter Airport	EXT
Hull	Humberside Airport	HUY
Leeds/Bradford	Leeds Bradford Airport	LBA
Liverpool	Liverpool John Lennon Airport	LPL
London	Gatwick Airport	LGW
London	Heathrow Airport	LHR
London	London City Airport	LCY
London	London Southend Airport	SEN
London	London Stansted Airport	STN
London	Luton Airport	LTN
Manchester	Manchester Airport	MAN
Middlesbrough	Teesside International Airport	MME
Newcastle upon Tyne	Newcastle International Airport	NCL
Newquay	Newquay Airport	NQY
Norwich	Norwich Airport	NWI
Nottingham	East Midlands Airport	EMA
Southampton	Southampton Airport	SOU

Northern Ireland, Scotland and Wales
Location	Airport	IATA Code
Aberdeen (Scotland)	Aberdeen Airport	ABZ
Belfast (Northern Ireland)	Belfast International Airport	BFS
Belfast (Northern Ireland)	George Best Belfast City Airport	BHD
Cardiff (Wales)	Cardiff Airport	CWL
Derry (Northern Ireland)	City of Derry Airport	LDY
Edinburgh (Scotland)	Edinburgh Airport	EDI
Glasgow (Scotland)	Glasgow Airport	GLA
Glasgow (Scotland)	Glasgow Prestwick Airport	PIK
Inverness (Scotland)	Inverness Airport	INV

==== Crown Dependencies and Gibraltar ====
Crown Dependencies and Gibraltar
Location	Airport	IATA Code
Alderney (Bailiwick of Guernsey)	Alderney Airport	ACI
Douglas (Isle of Man)	Isle of Man Airport	IOM
Gibraltar (Gibraltar)	Gibraltar International Airport	GIB
Saint Peter Port (Guernsey)	Guernsey Airport	GCI
Saint Helier (Jersey)	Jersey Airport	JER

=== Central Europe ===
==== Austria ====
Location	Airport	IATA Code
Graz	Graz Airport	GRZ
Klagenfurt	Klagenfurt Airport	KLU
Innsbruck	Innsbruck Airport	INN
Linz	Linz Airport	LNZ
Salzburg	Salzburg Airport	SZG
Vienna	Vienna International Airport	VIE

==== Czech Republic ====
Location	Airport	IATA Code
Brno	Brno–Tuřany Airport	BRQ
České Budějovice	České Budějovice Airport	JCL
Karlovy Vary	Karlovy Vary Airport	KLV
Ostrava	Leoš Janáček Airport	OSR
Pardubice	Pardubice Airport	PED
Prague	Václav Havel Airport	PRG

==== Germany ====
Location	Airport	IATA Code
Baden-Baden/Karlsruhe	Karlsruhe/Baden-Baden Airport	FKB
Berlin	Berlin Brandenburg Airport	BER
Bremen	Bremen Airport	BRE
Cologne/Bonn	Cologne/Bonn Airport	CGN
Dortmund	Dortmund Airport	DTM
Düsseldorf	Düsseldorf Airport	DUS
Frankfurt	Frankfurt Airport	FRA
Frankfurt	Frankfurt-Hahn Airport	HHN
Freiburg im Breisgau	EuroAirport Basel–Mulhouse–Freiburg	BSL/MLH/EAP
Friedrichshafen	Friedrichshafen Airport	FDH
Hamburg	Hamburg Airport	HAM
Hanover	Hannover Airport	HAJ
Leipzig	Leipzig/Halle Airport	LEJ
Lübeck	Lübeck Airport	LBC
Memmingen	Memmingen Airport	FMM
Munich	Munich Airport	MUC
Nuremberg	Nuremberg Airport	NUE
Stuttgart	Stuttgart Airport	STR
Weeze	Weeze Airport	NRN

==== Hungary ====
Location	Airport	IATA Code
Budapest	Budapest Ferenc Liszt International Airport	BUD
Debrecen	Debrecen International Airport	DEB
Győr	Győr-Pér International Airport	QGY
Hévíz	Hévíz-Balaton Airport	SOB
Pécs	Pécs-Pogány International Airport	QPJ

==== Poland ====
Location	Airport	IATA Code
Bydgoszcz	Bydgoszcz Ignacy Jan Paderewski Airport	BZG
Gdańsk	Gdańsk Lech Wałęsa Airport	GDN
Katowice	Katowice Airport	KTW
Kraków	Kraków John Paul II International Airport	KRK
Lublin	Lublin Airport	LUZ
Łódź	Łódź Władysław Reymont Airport	LCJ
Olsztyn	Olsztyn-Mazury Airport	SZY
Poznań	Poznań–Ławica Airport	POZ
Rzeszów	Rzeszów–Jasionka Airport	RZE
Szczecin	Solidarity Szczecin–Goleniów Airport	SZZ
Warsaw	Warsaw Chopin Airport	WAW
Warsaw	Warsaw Modlin Airport	WMI
Warsaw	Warsaw Radom Airport	RDO
Wrocław	Wrocław Airport	WRO

==== Slovakia ====
Location	Airport	IATA Code
Bratislava	Bratislava Airport	BTS
Košice	Košice International Airport	KSC
Piešťany	Piešťany Airport	PZY
Poprad	Poprad-Tatry Airport	TAT
Žilina	Žilina Airport	ILZ

==== Switzerland ====
Location	Airport	IATA Code
Basel	EuroAirport Basel Mulhouse Freiburg	BSL/MLH/EAP
Bern	Bern Airport	BRN
Geneva	Geneva Airport	GVA
Lugano	Lugano Airport	LUG
St. Gallen	St. Gallen–Altenrhein Airport	ACH
Zürich	Zurich Airport	ZRH

=== Southern Europe ===
==== Croatia ====
Location	Airport	IATA Code
Brač	Brač Airport	BWK
Dubrovnik	Dubrovnik Airport	DBV
Mali Lošinj	Lošinj Airport	LSZ
Osijek	Osijek Airport	OSI
Pula	Pula Airport	PUY
Rijeka	Rijeka Airport	RJK
Split	Split Airport	SPU
Zadar	Zadar Airport	ZAD
Zagreb	Zagreb Airport	ZAG

==== Greece ====
Location	Airport	IATA Code
Athens	Athens International Airport	ATH
Cephalonia	Kefalonia Island International Airport	EFL
Chania	Chania International Airport	CHQ
Chios	Chios Island National Airport	JKH
Corfu	Corfu International Airport	CFU
Heraklion	Heraklion International Airport	HER
Kalamata	Kalamata International Airport	KLX
Karpathos	Karpathos Island National Airport	AOK
Kavala	Kavala International Airport	KVA
Kos	Kos International Airport	KGS
Mykonos	Mykonos Airport	JMK
Mytilene	Mytilene International Airport	MJT
Preveza	Aktion National Airport	PVK
Rhodes	Rhodes International Airport	RHO
Samos	Samos International Airport	SMI
Santorini	Santorini (Thira) International Airport	JTR
Skiathos	Skiathos International Airport	JSI
Skyros	Skyros Island National Airport	SKU
Thessaloniki	Thessaloniki Airport	SKG
Volos	Nea Anchialos National Airport	VOL
Zakynthos	Zakynthos International Airport	ZTH

==== Italy ====
Location	Airport	IATA Code
Alghero	Fertilia Airport	AHO
Ancona	Ancona Airport	AOI
Bari	Palese Airport	BRI
Bergamo	Orio al Serio Airport	BGY
Bologna	Bologna Airport	BLQ
Brescia	Brescia Airport	VBS
Brindisi	Brindisi Airport	BDS
Cagliari	Cagliari Airport	CAG
Catania	Fontanarossa Airport	CTA
Cuneo	Cuneo Levaldigi Airport	CUF
Florence	Peretola Airport	FLR
Genoa	Cristoforo Colombo Airport	GOA
Lamezia	Lamezia Terme Airport	SUF
Milan	Linate Airport	LIN
Milan	Milan Malpensa Airport	MXP
Naples	Naples International Airport	NAP
Olbia	Costa Smeralda Airport	OLB
Palermo	Palermo Airport	PMO
Parma	Giuseppe Verdi Airport	PMF
Perugia	San Egidio Airport	PEG
Pescara	Abruzzo Airport	PSR
Pisa	Galileo Galilei Airport	PSA
Rimini	Federico Fellini Airport	RMI
Rome	Leonardo da Vinci–Fiumicino Airport	FCO
Rome	Rome Ciampino Airport	CIA
Salerno	Salerno Costa d'Amalfi Airport	QSR
Trapani	Vincenzo Florio Airport	TPS
Trieste	Friuli Venezia Giulia Airport	TRS
Turin	Caselle Airport	TRN
Venice	Venice Marco Polo Airport	VCE
Verona	Verona Villafranca Airport	VRN

==== Malta ====
Location	Airport	IATA Code
Ħal Luqa	Malta International Airport	MLA

==== Portugal ====
Location	Airport	IATA Code
Beja	Beja Airport	BYJ
Faro	Faro Airport	FAO
Funchal	Madeira Airport	FNC
Lisbon	Lisbon Airport	LIS
Ponta Delgada	João Paulo II Airport	PDL
Porto	Porto Airport	OPO
Porto Santo Island	Porto Santo Airport	PXO
Terceira Island	Lajes Airport	TER

==== Slovenia ====
Location	Airport	IATA Code
Ljubljana	Ljubljana Jože Pučnik Airport	LJU
Maribor	Maribor Edvard Rusjan Airport	MBX
Portorož	Portorož Airport	POW

==== Spain ====
Location	Airport	IATA Code
A Coruña	A Coruña Airport	LCG
Alicante	Alicante–Elche Miguel Hernández Airport	ALC
Almería	Almería Airport	LEI
Asturias	Asturias Airport	OVD
Barcelona	Josep Tarradellas Barcelona–El Prat Airport	BCN
Bilbao	Bilbao Airport	BIO
Castellón de la Plana	Castellón–Costa Azahar Airport	CDT
Fuerteventura	Fuerteventura Airport	FUE
Girona	Girona-Costa Brava Airport	GRO
Gran Canaria	Gran Canaria Airport	LPA
Granada	Federico García Lorca Granada Airport	GRX
Huesca	Huesca-Pirineos Airport	HSK
Ibiza	Ibiza Airport	IBZ
Jerez de la Frontera	Jerez Airport	XRY
La Palma	La Palma Airport	SPC
Lanzarote	Lanzarote Airport	ACE
Lleida	Alguaire Airport	ILD
Madrid	Madrid-Barajas Airport	MAD
Málaga	Málaga Airport	AGP
Menorca	Menorca Airport	MAH
Murcia	Región de Murcia International Airport	RMU
Palma de Mallorca	Palma de Mallorca Airport	PMI
Pamplona	Pamplona Airport	PNA
Reus	Reus Airport	REU
Santander	Santander Airport	SDR
Santiago de Compostela	Santiago de Compostela Airport	SCQ
Seville	Seville Airport	SVQ
Tenerife	Tenerife North–Ciudad de La Laguna Airport	TFN
Tenerife	Tenerife South Airport	TFS
Valencia	Valencia Airport	VLC
Valladolid	Valladolid Airport	VLL
Vigo	Vigo–Peinador Airport	VGO
Vitoria-Gasteiz	Vitoria Airport	VIT
Zaragoza	Zaragoza Airport	ZAZ

=== Eastern Europe ===
==== Albania ====
Location	Airport	IATA Code
Kukes	Kukës International Airport Zayed	KFZ
Tirana	Tirana International Airport Nënë Tereza	TIA

==== Belarus ====
Location	Airport	IATA Code
Grodno	Hrodna Airport	GNA
Gomel	Gomel Airport	GME
Minsk	Minsk International Airport	MSQ

==== Bosnia and Herzegovina ====
Location	Airport	IATA Code
Banja Luka	Banja Luka International Airport	BNX
Mostar	Mostar International Airport	OMO
Sarajevo	Sarajevo International Airport	SJJ
Tuzla	Tuzla International Airport	TZL

==== Bulgaria ====
Location	Airport	IATA Code
Burgas	Burgas Airport	BOJ
Plovdiv	Plovdiv Airport	PDV
Sofia	Sofia Airport	SOF
Varna	Varna Airport	VAR

==== Kosovo ====
Location	Airport	IATA Code
Pristina	Pristina International Airport	PRN

==== Moldova ====
Location	Airport	IATA Code
Chişinău	Chișinău International Airport	RMO

==== Romania ====
Location	Airport	IATA Code
Arad	Arad International Airport	ARW
Bacau	George Enescu International Airport	BCM
Baia Mare	Maramureș Airport	BAY
Brașov	Brașov-Ghimbav International Airport	GHV
Bucharest	Henri Coandă International Airport	OTP
Bucharest	Aurel Vlaicu International Airport	BBU
Cluj-Napoca	Cluj-Napoca International Airport	CLJ
Constanța	Mihail Kogălniceanu International Airport	CND
Craiova	Craiova International Airport	CRA
Iași	Iași International Airport	IAS
Oradea	Oradea International Airport	OMR
Satu Mare	Satu Mare International Airport	SUJ
Sibiu	Sibiu International Airport	SBZ
Suceava	Suceava International Airport	SCV
Târgu Mureș	Târgu Mureș International Airport	TGM
Timișoara	Timișoara Traian Vuia International Airport	TSR

==== Montenegro ====
Location	Airport	IATA Code
Podgorica	Podgorica Airport	TGD
Tivat	Tivat Airport	TIV

==== North Macedonia ====
Location	Airport	IATA Code
Ohrid	Ohrid St. Paul the Apostle Airport	OHD
Skopje	Skopje International Airport	SKP

==== Russia ====
Location	Airport	IATA Code
Abakan	Abakan International Airport	ABA
Anadyr	Ugolny Airport	DYR
Anapa	Anapa Airport	AAQ
Arkhangelsk	Talagi Airport	ARH
Astrakhan	Narimanovo Airport	ASF
Barnaul	Barnaul Airport	BAX
Belgorod	Belgorod International Airport	EGO
Blagoveshchensk	Ignatyevo Airport	BQS
Bratsk	Bratsk Airport	BTK
Bryansk	Bryansk International Airport	BZK
Cheboksary	Cheboksary International Airport	CSY
Chelyabinsk	Chelyabinsk Airport	CEK
Cherepovets	Cherepovets Airport	CEE
Chita	Chita-Kadala International Airport	HTA
Elista	Elista Airport	ESL
Grozny	Grozny Airport	GRV
Irkutsk	Irkutsk Airport	IKT
Kaliningrad	Khrabrovo Airport	KGD
Kazan	Kazan Airport	KZN
Khabarovsk	Khabarovsk Novy Airport	KHV
Komsomolsk-on-Amur	Komsomolsk-on-Amur Airport	KXK
Krasnodar	Pashkovsky Airport	KRR
Krasnoyarsk	Yemelyanovo International Airport	KJA
Kursk	Kursk Vostochny Airport	URS
Magadan	Sokol Airport	GDX
Magnitogorsk	Magnitogorsk International Airport	MQF
Makhachkala	Uytash Airport	MCX
Mineralnye Vody	Mineralnye Vody Airport	MRV
Moscow	Domodedovo International Airport	DME
Moscow	Zhukovsky International Airport	ZIA
Moscow	Sheremetyevo International Airport	SVO
Moscow	Vnukovo Airport	VKO
Murmansk	Murmansk Airport	MMK
Nalchik	Nalchik Airport	NAL
Nizhnekamsk	Begishevo Airport	NBC
Nizhnevartovsk	Nizhnevartovsk Airport	NJC
Nizhny Novgorod	Strigino Airport	GOJ
Novokuznetsk	Spichenkovo Airport	NOZ
Novosibirsk	Tolmachevo Airport	OVB
Omsk	Omsk Tsentralny Airport	OMS
Orenburg	Orenburg Tsentralny Airport	REN
Orsk	Orsk Airport	OSW
Perm	Perm International Airport	PEE
Petrozavodsk	Petrozavodsk Airport	PES
Provideniya	Provideniya Bay Airport	PVS
Petropavlovsk-Kamchatsky	Yelizovo Airport	PKC
Pskov	Pskov Airport	PKV
Rostov-on-Don	Platov International Airport	ROV
St. Petersburg	Pulkovo Airport	LED
Samara	Samara Kurumoch Airport	KUF
Saratov	Saratov Gagarin Airport	GSV
Sochi	Sochi International Airport	AER
Stavropol	Stavropol Shpakovskoye Airport	STW
Surgut	Farman Salmanov Surgut Airport	SGC
Syktyvkar	Syktyvkar Airport	SCW
Tomsk	Bogashevo Airport	TOF
Tyumen	Roshchino International Airport	TJM
Ulan-Ude	Baikal International Airport	UUD
Ulyanovsk	Ulyanovsk Baratayevka Airport	ULV
Ufa	Ufa International Airport	UFA
Vladivostok	Vladivostok International Airport	VVO
Vladikavkaz	Beslan Airport	OGZ
Volgograd	Volgograd International Airport	VOG
Voronezh	Voronezh International Airport	VOZ
Yakutsk	Yakutsk Airport	YKS
Yaroslavl	Tunoshna Airport	IAR
Yekaterinburg	Koltsovo International Airport	SVX
Yuzhno-Sakhalinsk	Yuzhno-Sakhalinsk Airport	UUS

==== Serbia ====
Location	Airport	IATA Code
Belgrade	Belgrade Nikola Tesla Airport	BEG
Kraljevo	Morava Airport	KVO
Niš	Niš Constantine the Great Airport	INI

==== Ukraine ====
Location	Airport	IATA Code
Chernivtsi	Chernivtsi International Airport	CWC
Ivano-Frankivsk	Ivano-Frankivsk International Airport	IFO
Kharkiv	Kharkiv International Airport	HRK
Kryvyi Rih	Kryvyi Rih International Airport	KWG
Kyiv	Boryspil International Airport	KBP
Kyiv	Kyiv International Airport	IEV
Lviv	Lviv Danylo Halytskyi International Airport	LWO
Mykolaiv	Mykolaiv International Airport	NLV
Odesa	Odesa International Airport	ODS
Poltava	Poltava Airport	PLV
Simferopol	Simferopol International Airport	SIP
Uzhhorod	Uzhhorod International Airport	UDJ
Zaporizhzhia	Zaporizhzhia International Airport	OZH

=== Nordic Region ===
==== Baltics ====
Estonia
Location	Airport	IATA Code
Pärnu	Pärnu Airport	EPU
Tallinn	Lennart Meri Tallinn Airport	TLL
Tartu	Tartu Airport	TAY

Latvia
Location	Airport	IATA Code
Riga	Riga International Airport	RIX
Ventspils	Ventspils International Airport	VNT

Lithuania
Location	Airport	IATA Code
Kaunas	Kaunas Airport	KUN
Palanga	Palanga International Airport	PLQ
Šiauliai	Šiauliai International Airport	SQQ
Vilnius	Vilnius Airport	VNO

==== Kingdom of Denmark ====
Location	Airport	IATA Code
Aalborg	Aalborg Airport	AAL
Aarhus	Aarhus Airport	AAR
Billund	Billund Airport	BLL
Copenhagen	Copenhagen Airport	CPH
Vágar (Faroe Islands)	Vágar Airport	FAE

==== Finland ====
Location	Airport	IATA Code
Åland	Mariehamn Airport	MHQ
Helsinki	Helsinki-Vantaa Airport	HEL
Ivalo	Ivalo Airport	IVL
Kittilä	Kittilä Airport	KTT
Kuopio	Kuopio Airport	KUO
Kuusamo	Kuusamo Airport	KAO
Lappeenranta	Lappeenranta Airport	LPP
Oulu	Oulu Airport	OUL
Rovaniemi	Rovaniemi Airport	RVN
Savonlinna	Savonlinna Airport	SVL
Tampere	Tampere–Pirkkala Airport	TMP
Turku	Turku Airport	TKU
Vaasa	Vaasa Airport	VAA

==== Iceland ====
Location	Airport	IATA Code
Akureyri	Akureyri Airport	AEY
Egilsstaðir	Egilsstaðir Airport	EGS
Reykjavík	Keflavik International Airport	KEF
Reykjavík	Reykjavík Airport	RKV

==== Norway ====
Location	Airport	IATA Code
Ålesund	Ålesund Airport	AES
Bergen	Bergen Airport	BGO
Bodø	Bodø Airport	BOO
Haugesund	Haugesund Airport	HAU
Kristiansand	Kristiansand Airport, Kjevik	KRS
Kristiansund	Kristiansund Airport, Kvernberget	KSU
Oslo	Oslo Airport, Gardermoen	OSL
Oslo	Sandefjord Airport, Torp	TRF
Stavanger	Stavanger Airport	SVG
Tromsø	Tromsø Airport	TOS
Trondheim	Trondheim Airport	TRD

==== Sweden ====
Location	Airport	IATA Code
Gothenburg	Göteborg Landvetter Airport	GOT
Luleå	Luleå Airport	LLA
Malmö	Malmö Airport	MMX
Norrköping	Norrköping Airport	NRK
Östersund	Åre Östersund Airport	OSD
Stockholm	Stockholm Arlanda Airport	ARN
Stockholm	Stockholm Bromma Airport	BMA
Stockholm	Stockholm Skavsta Airport	NYO
Stockholm	Stockholm Västerås Airport	VST
Sundsvall	Sundsvall–Timrå Airport	SDL
Umeå	Umeå Airport	UME
Växjö	Växjö Airport	VXO
Visby	Visby Airport	VBY

== Oceania ==
=== American Samoa ===
Location	Airport	IATA Code
Pago Pago	Pago Pago International Airport	PPG

=== Australia ===
Location	Airport	IATA Code
Adelaide	Adelaide Airport	ADL
Brisbane	Brisbane Airport	BNE
Broome	Broome International Airport	BME
Cairns	Cairns Airport	CNS
Canberra	Canberra Airport	CBR
Darwin	Darwin International Airport	DRW
Gold Coast	Gold Coast Airport	OOL
Hobart	Hobart Airport	HBA
Horn Island	Horn Island Airport	HID
Melbourne	Melbourne Airport	MEL
Newcastle	Newcastle Airport	NTL
Perth	Perth Airport	PER
Sunshine Coast	Sunshine Coast Airport	MCY
Sydney	Sydney Airport	SYD
Sydney	Western Sydney Airport	WSI

=== Christmas Island ===
Location	Airport	IATA Code
Flying Fish Cove	Christmas Island Airport	XCH

=== Cocos (Keeling) Islands ===
Location	Airport	IATA Code
Cocos (Keeling) Islands	Cocos (Keeling) Islands Airport	CCK

=== Cook Islands ===
Location	Airport	IATA Code
Avarua	Rarotonga Airport	RAR

=== Easter Island ===
Location	Airport	IATA Code
Hanga Roa	Mataveri International Airport	IPC

=== Fiji ===
Location	Airport	IATA Code
Nadi	Nadi International Airport	NAN
Suva	Nausori International Airport	SUV

=== French Polynesia ===
Location	Airport	IATA Code
Papeete	Faa'a International Airport	PPT

=== Guam ===
Location	Airport	IATA Code
Hagåtña	Antonio B. Won Pat International Airport	GUM

=== Kiribati ===
Location	Airport	IATA Code
Kiritimati	Cassidy International Airport	CXI
Tarawa	Bonriki International Airport	TRW

=== Marshall Islands ===
Location	Airport	IATA Code
Kwajalein	Bucholz Army Airfield	KWA
Majuro	Marshall Islands International Airport	MAJ

=== Federated States of Micronesia ===
Location	Airport	IATA Code
Chuuk	Chuuk International Airport	TKK
Kosrae	Kosrae International Airport	KSA
Pohnpei	Pohnpei International Airport	PNI
Yap	Yap International Airport	YAP

=== Nauru ===
Location	Airport	IATA Code
Yaren District	Nauru International Airport	INU

=== New Caledonia ===
Location	Airport	IATA Code
Nouméa	La Tontouta International Airport	NOU

=== New Zealand ===
Location	Airport	IATA Code
Auckland	Auckland Airport	AKL
Christchurch	Christchurch Airport	CHC
Dunedin	Dunedin Airport	DUD
Hamilton	Hamilton Airport	HLZ
Queenstown	Queenstown Airport	ZQN
Wellington	Wellington Airport	WLG

=== Niue ===
Location	Airport	IATA Code
Alofi	Niue International Airport	IUE

=== Norfolk Island ===
Location	Airport	IATA Code
Burnt Pine	Norfolk Island Airport	NLK

=== Northern Mariana Islands ===
Location	Airport	IATA Code
Rota	Rota International Airport	ROP
Saipan	Saipan International Airport	SPN
Tinian	Tinian International Airport	TIQ

=== Palau ===
Location	Airport	IATA Code
Koror	Roman Tmetuchl International Airport	ROR

=== Papua New Guinea ===
Location	Airport	IATA Code
Daru	Daru Airport	DAU
Mount Hagen	Mount Hagen Airport	HGU
Port Moresby	Jacksons International Airport	POM

=== Samoa ===
Location	Airport	IATA Code
Apia	Faleolo International Airport	APW

=== Solomon Islands ===
Location	Airport	IATA Code
Honiara	Honiara International Airport	HIR

=== Tonga ===
Location	Airport	IATA Code
Nukuʻalofa	Fuaʻamotu International Airport	TBU
Vavaʻu	Vavaʻu International Airport	VAV

=== Tuvalu ===
Location	Airport	IATA Code
Funafuti	Funafuti International Airport	FUN

=== Vanuatu ===
Location	Airport	IATA Code
Luganville	Santo-Pekoa International Airport	SON
Port Vila	Bauerfield International Airport	VLI

=== Wallis and Futuna ===
Location	Airport	IATA Code
Futuna	Pointe Vele Airport	FUT
Wallis	Hihifo Airport	WLS

== See also ==
- Lists of airports
