= List of airports in Azerbaijan =

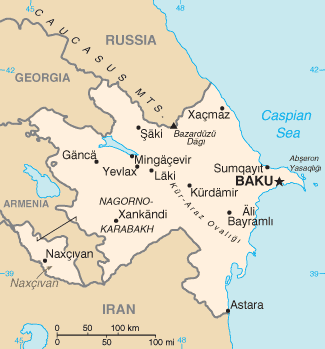
Map of Azerbaijan

This is a list of airports in Azerbaijan, grouped by type and sorted by location.

Azerbaijan, formally the Republic of Azerbaijan (Azerbaijani: Azərbaycan Respublikası), is a country in the Caucasus region of Eurasia. It is bounded by the Caspian Sea to the east, Russia to the north, Georgia to the northwest, Armenia to the west, and Iran to the south. The exclave of Nakhchivan is bounded by Armenia to the north and east, Iran to the south and west, while having a short borderline with Turkey to the northwest. The country's capital city is Baku. Air transportation in Azerbaijan is regulated by the Ministry of Transportation of Azerbaijan Republic.

A$40 million project to lengthen the main runway at Ganja Airport has been completed, allowing the first international direct connections to the city. Similar projects are underway at Lenkoran and Zaqatala and due for completion in 2007.

== Airports ==
Names shown in bold indicate the airport has scheduled passenger service on commercial airlines.

City served	ICAO	DAFIF	IATA	Airport name	Coordinates
**Public airports**					
Ələt (Alat free economic zone)	-	-	SWZ	Alat Cargo Airport (under construction)	39°57′0″N 49°24′24″E
Ağdam (Agdam)	UBEA			Agdam Airport	39°58′33″N 47°0′0″E
Agjabedi	UBEY			Agjabedi Airport	40°1′20″N 47°26′57″E
Ağstafa (Agstafa)	UBBA	UB17		Akstafa Airport	41°07′24″N 045°25′17″E
Baku	UBBB		GYD	**Heydar Aliyev International Airport**	40°28′03″N 050°02′48″E
Baku	UBTT		ZXT	Zabrat Airport	40°29′42″N 049°58′37″E
Baku	UBLL			Lokbatan Airport	40°20′59″N 49°40′11″E
Baku	UBBP			Pirallahi Heliport	40°25′5″N 50°21′23″E
Baku	UBBC			Çilov Heliport	40°32′4″N 50°32′08″E
Baku	UBCH			Central Hospital Heliport	40°39′7″N 49°30′18″E
Balakən (Balakan)	UB0G	UB16		Balakan Airport	41°45′12″N 046°21′19″E
Fuzuli	UBBF		FZL	**Fuzuli International Airport**	39°59′44″N 47°19′6″E
Ganja	UBBG		GNJ	**Ganja International Airport**	40°44′15″N 046°19′03″E
Hajiqabul	UBBM			Hajiqabul Airport	40°2′7″N 48°54′36″E
Khachmaz	UBBH			Khachmaz Airport	41°45′16″N 48°26′01″E
Khankendi (Stepanakert)	UBBS	UB13		Khojali Airport (public)	39°54′05″N 046°47′13″E
Lachin	-	-	LHL	Lachin International Airport	39°52′45″N 046°20′48″E
Lankaran	UBBL	UB10	LLK	**Lankaran International Airport**	38°44′47″N 048°49′04″E
Naftalan	UBEN			Naftalan Airport	40°30′57″N 46°49′46″E
Nakhchivan	UBBN	UB15	NAJ	**Nakhchivan International Airport** (public / military)	39°11′19″N 045°27′30″E
Qabala (Gabala / Qəbələ)	UBBQ		GBB	Qabala International Airport	40°49′36″N 047°42′45″E
Shaki	UBEI			Shaki Airport	41°8′11″N 047°9′34″E
Yevlakh	UBEE		YLV	Yevlakh Airport	40°37′57″N 047°08′28″E
Zangilan	UBBZ		ZZE	Zangilan International Airport	39°5′39.89″N 46°44′2.75″E
Zaqatala	UBBY		ZTU	Zaqatala International Airport	41°33′44″N 046°40′02″E
**Military airports**					
Baku		UB18		Baku Kala Air Base	40°24′23″N 050°12′00″E
Dəllər (Dollyar)		UB11		Dollyar Air Base	40°53′15″N 045°57′25″E
Kürdəmir (Kurdamir)		UB14		Kyurdamir Air Base	40°16′24″N 048°09′48″E
Sitalçay				Sitalchay Military Airbase	40°47′02″N 049°24′02″E
Sumqayit	UBBI	UB12		Nasosnaya Air Base	40°35′29″N 049°33′26″E

== See also ==
- Transport in Azerbaijan
- Azerbaijan Air Force
- List of airports by ICAO code: U#UB - Azerbaijan
- List of the busiest airports in the former Soviet Union
- Wikipedia: WikiProject Aviation/Airline destination lists: Asia#Azerbaijan
