= Qabala International Airport =

Qabala Airport Qəbələ Beynəlxalq Aeroportu
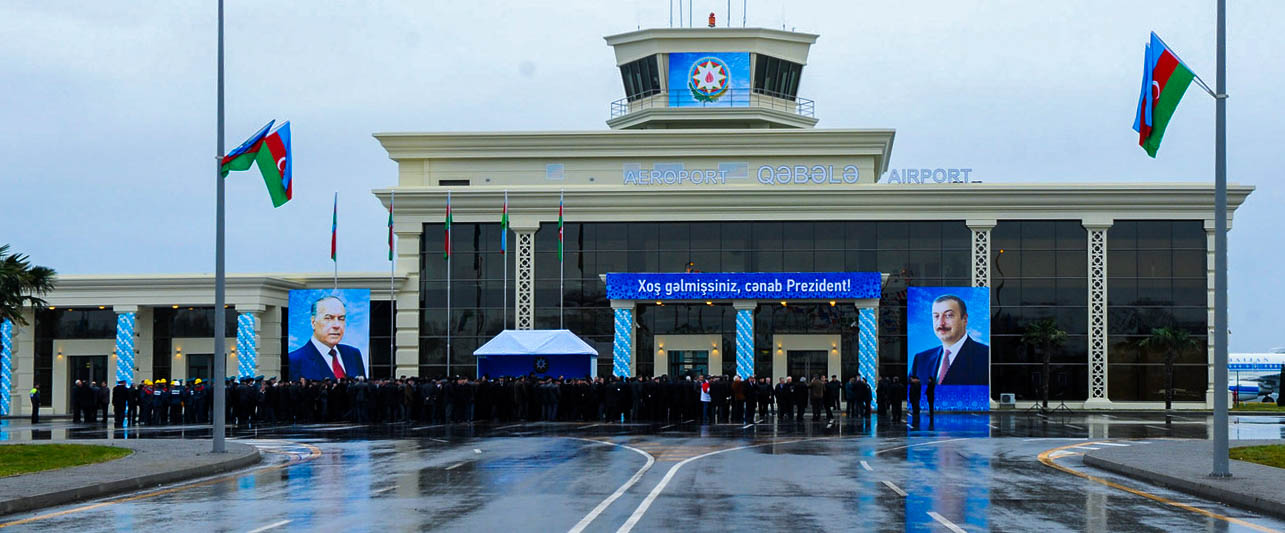
- IATA: GBB; ICAO: UBBQ

Summary
- Airport type: Public
- Operator: Government
- Serves: Qabala
- Location: Qabala, Azerbaijan
- Elevation AMSL: 1,129 ft (344 m)
- Coordinates: 40°49′36″N 047°42′45″E

Map
- Location of airport in Qabala, Azerbaijan GBB/UBBQ (West and Central Asia) GBB/UBBQ (Asia) GBB/UBBQ (Europe)

Runways
Direction	Length		Surface
Direction	m	ft	Surface
16/34	3,600	11,809	Asphalt/Concrete

Statistics (2014)
- Passengers: 55,651
- Passenger change 13–14: ▲19.3%
- Aircraft movements: 918
- Movements change 13–14: ▲2.0%
- Elevation/runway: DAFIF; Coordinates: WikiMapia

Qabala International Airport (Azerbaijani: Qəbələ Beynəlxalq Aeroportu) (IATA: GBB, ICAO: UBBQ) is an airport serving Qabala (also known as Qəbələ or Gabala), the capital of the Gabala district (rayon) in Azerbaijan. The airport was officially opened by President Ilham Aliyev on 17 November 2011.

== History ==
The construction of Gabala Airport began in 2011 and was inaugurated in the same year. In the same year, Gabala Airport was granted international status. The airport's first international flight began operating in November 2012. The first international flight was operated by the Russian company Ural Airlines on the Moscow-Gabala route.

In 2020, before the start of the Second Nagorno-Karabakh War, during joint military exercises between the Azerbaijani and Turkish armies, 6 F-16 fighter jets belonging to the Turkish Air Force were first stationed at Ganja International Airport and then at Gabala Airport. These aircraft continued to remain in Gabala during the war. Although President Ilham Aliyev confirmed in his address to the people that these aircraft were in Azerbaijan, he stated that they did not participate in military operations in Karabakh, and that the F-16 aircraft would protect Azerbaijan if a third party intervened in the war.

== Facilities ==
The airport resides at an elevation of 935 feet (285 m) above mean sea level. It has one runway designated 16/34 with an asphalt surface measuring 3,600 by 60 metres (11,811 ft × 197 ft). Runway 16 is equipped with an ILS CAT II, which enables aircraft operations in low ceiling (30 meters) and visibility (350 meters).

== Airlines and destinations ==
Airlines	Destinations
Azerbaijan Airlines	Baku

== Statistics ==
Traffic by calendar year. Official ACI Statistics
	Passengers	Change from previous year	Aircraft operations	Change from previous year	Cargo (metric tons)	Change from previous year
2013	46,658	N.D.	900	N.D.	327	N.D.
2014	55,651	▲19.27%	918	▲2.00%	3	▼99.08%
Source: Airports Council International. World Airport Traffic Reports (Years 2013, and 2014)

== See also ==
- "Gabala International Airport". Azerbaijan Republic Gabala.
- Transport in Azerbaijan
- List of airports in Azerbaijan
