= Nakhchivan International Airport =

Airport in Azerbaijan

Nakhchivan International Airport Naxçıvan Hava Limanı
- IATA: NAJ; ICAO: UBBN

Summary
- Airport type: Public / Military
- Owner: Government of Azerbaijan
- Serves: Nakhchivan
- Location: Nakhchivan (city), Nakhchivan, Azerbaijan
- Focus city for: Azerbaijan Airlines
- Elevation AMSL: 2,863 ft (873 m)
- Coordinates: 39°11′19″N 045°27′30″E
- Website: airportnakhchivan.com

Map
- Location of airport in Nakhchivan, Azerbaijan NAJ/UBBN (West and Central Asia) NAJ/UBBN (Asia) NAJ/UBBN (Europe)

Runways
Direction	Length		Surface
Direction	m	ft	Surface
14R/32L	3,300	10,826	Concrete
14L/32R	3,300	10,826	Asphalt

Statistics (2014)
- Passengers: 526,155
- Passenger change 13–14: ▲4.9%
- Aircraft movements: 4,224
- Movements change 13–14: ▲5.6%
- Source: DAFIF, ACI's 2014 World Airport Traffic Report.

Nakhchivan International Airport (Azerbaijani: Naxçıvan Beynəlxalq Hava Limanı) (IATA: NAJ, ICAO: UBBN) is a civilian airport and Azerbaijani military airbase located in Nakhchivan, the capital of the Nakhchivan Autonomous Republic, a landlocked exclave of Azerbaijan. The airport was built between 1974-1976.

== Facilities ==
Main Terminal

The airport is at an elevation of 2,863 feet (873 m) above mean sea level. It has two runways: 14R/32L with a concrete surface measuring 3,300 by 45 metres (10,827 ft × 148 ft) and 14L/32R with an asphalt surface measuring 3,300 by 42 metres (10,827 ft × 138 ft).

== History ==
On 5 March 2026, it was reported that Iranian missiles and drones struck the airport area, due to the ongoing 2026 Iran War. In the aftermath of the event, the air traffic was diverted to the Iğdır Airport in neighboring Iğdır, Turkey during the airport's temporary closure.

== Airlines and destinations ==
Airlines	Destinations
AJet	Istanbul–Sabiha Gökçen
Azerbaijan Airlines	Baku, Ganja
Turkish Airlines	Istanbul
Utair	Moscow–Vnukovo

== Statistics ==
Traffic by calendar year. Official ACI Statistics
	Passengers	Change from previous year	Aircraft operations	Change from previous year	Cargo (metric tons)	Change from previous year
2012	426,848	N.D.	3,685	N.D.	1,293	N.D.
2013	501,690	▲17.53%	4,000	▲8.55%	1,629	▲25.99%
2014	526,155	▲4.88%	4,224	▲5.60%	1,342	▼17.62%
Source: Airports Council International. World Airport Traffic Reports (Years 2012, 2013, and 2014)

== See also ==
- Transport in Azerbaijan
- List of airports in Azerbaijan
