= Dallar Air Base =

- IATA: none; ICAO: none

Summary
- Airport type: Military
- Operator: Military
- Location: Dallar, Azerbaijan
- Elevation AMSL: 1,099 ft / 335 m
- Coordinates: 40°53′15″N 045°57′25″E
- Interactive map of Dallar Air Base

Runways
Direction	Length		Surface
Direction	m	ft	Surface
10/28	2,494	8,182	Concrete
- Source: DAFIF

Dallar Air Base is a military airbase in Dallar (also known as Dəllər), a town in the Shamkir District (rayon) in Azerbaijan. From 1955 to 1992, the 882nd Independent Tilzitskiy Reconnaissance Aviation Regiment of the 34th Air Army, Transcaucasian Military District, was located at the base. It flew Yak-28PPs, (transferred to the 151st OAPREB), MiG-25RBs, 1984?-1992, and Su-24MRs, 1987–1992. It was equipped with 16 MiG-25RB and 11 Su-24MR [CFE treaty data exchange] in November 1990. It was disbanded in 1992, with a directive to that effect being issued on 29 July 1992.

== See also ==
- List of airports in Azerbaijan
