= Yevlakh Airport =

Airport in Azerbaijan

Yevlax Airport Yevlax Hava Limanı
- IATA: YLV; ICAO: UBEE

Summary
- Airport type: Public
- Operator: Government
- Serves: Yevlax, Azerbaijan
- Coordinates: 40°38′03″N 047°08′21″E

Map
- Location of the airport in Azerbaijan YLV/UBBE (Europe) YLV/UBBE (Asia)

Runways
Direction	Length		Surface
Direction	m	ft	Surface
12/30	2,520	8,268	Asphalt

Yevlax Airport (Azerbaijani: Yevlax Hava Limanı) (IATA: YLV, ICAO: UBEE) is an airport serving the city of Yevlax, Azerbaijan.

== See also ==
- List of airports in Azerbaijan
