= Zaqatala International Airport =

Zaqatala International Airport Zaqatala Beynəlxalq Hava Limanı
- IATA: ZTU; ICAO: UBBY

Summary
- Airport type: Public
- Operator: Government
- Serves: Zaqatala, Azerbaijan
- Elevation AMSL: 1,281 ft (390 m)
- Coordinates: 41°33′44″N 46°40′02″E

Map
- Location of airport in Zaqatala, Azerbaijan ZTU/UBBY (Europe) ZTU/UBBY (Asia)

Runways
Direction	Length		Surface
Direction	ft	m	Surface
15/33	9,843	3,000	Asphalt

Zaqatala International Airport (Azerbaijani: Zaqatala Beynəlxalq Hava Limanı) (IATA: ZTU, ICAO: UBBY) is an airport serving Zaqatala city in Azerbaijan. The latest reconstruction of the airport terminal and the runway was completed in 2008, after which the airport received an international status. It is located at the southern foot of the Main Caucasus range.

== Airlines and destinations ==
Currently, Zaqatala Airport does not have any scheduled passenger operations.

== See also ==
- Transport in Azerbaijan
- List of airports in Azerbaijan
