= Lankaran International Airport =

Lankaran International Airport Lənkəran Hava Limanı
- IATA: LLK; ICAO: UBBL

Summary
- Airport type: Public
- Operator: Government
- Serves: Lankaran, Azerbaijan
- Elevation AMSL: 30 ft (9.1 m)
- Coordinates: 38°45′31″N 048°48′23″E

Map
- Location of airport in Lankaran, Azerbaijan LLK/UBBL (West and Central Asia) LLK/UBBL (Asia)

Runways
| Direction | Length | | Surface |
| Direction | m | ft | Surface |
|---|---|---|---|
| 15/33 | 3,300 | 10,827 | Asphalt |

Statistics (2014)
- Passengers: 47,889
- Passenger change 13–14: ▼10.4%
- Aircraft movements: 442
- Movements change 13–14: ▼20.5%
- Source: EAD, ACI's 2014 World Airport Traffic Report.

Lankaran International Airport (Azerbaijani: Lənkəran Beynəlxalq Hava Limanı), (IATA: LLK, ICAO: UBBL) is an airport serving Lankaran, a city in Azerbaijan in the south-east of Azerbaijan. Reconstruction of the Lankaran airport started in 2005 and finished in 2008, when the Lankaran airport received the status of an international airport.

== Facilities ==
The airport is at an elevation of 35 feet (11 m) above mean sea level. It has one runway designated 15/33 with an asphalt surface measuring 3,300 by 45 metres (10,827 ft × 148 ft).

== Airlines and destinations ==
| Airlines | Destinations |
|---|---|
| Utair | Moscow–Vnukovo |

The Airport has a single destination: Moscow.

== Statistics ==
Traffic by calendar year. Official ACI Statistics
| | Passengers | Change from previous year | Aircraft operations | Change from previous year | Cargo (metric tons) | Change from previous year |
|---|---|---|---|---|---|---|
| 2013 | 53,435 | N.D. | 556 | N.D. | 10 | N.D. |
| 2014 | 47,889 | ▼10.38% | 442 | ▼20.50% | 15 | ▲50.00% |
Source: Airports Council International. World Airport Traffic Reports (Years 2013, and 2014)

== See also ==
- Transport in Azerbaijan
- List of airports in Azerbaijan
