= Balakan Airport =

Balakan Airport Balakən Hava Limanı
- IATA: none; ICAO: UB0G

Summary
- Airport type: Public
- Operator: Government
- Location: Balakan, Azerbaijan
- Elevation AMSL: 935 ft (285 m)
- Coordinates: 41°44′01″N 046°21′21″E

Map
- Location of airport in Azerbaijan UB0G (Europe)

Runways
Direction	Length		Surface
Direction	m	ft	Surface
13/31	1,209	3,966	Asphalt
- Elevation/runway: DAFIF; Coordinates: WikiMapia

Balakan Airport (Azerbaijani: Balakən Hava Limanı) is an airport serving Balakan, the capital of the Balakan District of Azerbaijan.

== Facilities ==
The airport resides at an elevation of 935 feet (285 m) above mean sea level. It has one runway designated 13/31 with an asphalt surface measuring 1,209 by 37 metres (3,967 ft × 121 ft).
