= Dəllər, Shamkir =

Dəllər
- Municipality
- Location within Azerbaijan
- Coordinates: 40°51′46″N 46°02′12″E
- Country: Azerbaijan
- Rayon: Shamkir

Population
  - Total: 4,284
- Time zone: UTC+4 (AZT)
  - Summer (DST): UTC+5 (AZT)

Dəllər (also, Dəlilər, Dallyar, and Dolyar) is a village and municipality in the Shamkir Rayon of Azerbaijan. It has a population of 4,284.

It is the location of Dallar Air Base, a military airbase.
