= Ganja International Airport =

Ganja International Airport Gəncə Beynəlxalq Hava Limanı
- IATA: GNJ; ICAO: UBBG

Summary
- Airport type: Public / Military
- Owner: Government of Azerbaijan
- Operator: Azerbaijan Airlines
- Serves: Ganja
- Location: Ganja, Azerbaijan
- Opened: 1951
- Elevation AMSL: 1,083 ft (330 m)
- Coordinates: 40°44′16″N 046°19′03″E

Map
- Location of airport in Ganja, Azerbaijan GNJ/UBBG (West and Central Asia) GNJ/UBBG (Asia) GNJ/UBBG (Europe)

Runways
Direction	Length		Surface
Direction	m	ft	Surface
12L/30R	3,300	10,827	Asphalt/Concrete
12R/30L	2.490	8.169	Concrete

Statistics (2014)
- Passengers: 329,156
- Passenger change 13–14: ▼4.6%
- Aircraft movements: 3,060
- Movements change 13–14: ▲0.3%
- Source: ACI's 2014 World Airport Traffic Report.

Ganja International Airport (Azerbaijani: Gəncə Beynəlxalq Hava Limanı) (IATA: GNJ, ICAO: UBBG) is an airport serving Ganja (also known as Gyandzha), the third-largest city in Azerbaijan.

== History ==
It was previously used by the Soviet Air Force. In 1996 the airport received the status of an international airport and since then is used for civil aviation purposes.

During the 2020 Nagorno-Karabakh war, Arayik Harutyunyan, president of the self-proclaimed Republic of Artsakh, on 4 October 2020 stated that the Artsakh Defense Army had hit Ganja's military airport, however, Azerbaijan said no military sites were hit. Reporters of Russian channel TV Rain reported that the airport had not been hit and that the airport had been closed since March due to the COVID-19 pandemic. Missiles hit residential buildings in the city, killing 1 person and wounding 32. On September 29, the Ministry of Defence of Armenia stated that a Turkish Air Force F-16 Viper shot down an Armenian Su-25 flying inside Armenian airspace, killing the pilot—also stating that Turkish F-16 jets had taken off earlier from Ganja airport and were assisting Azerbaijani forces in missile strikes against border regions near Vardenis in the Gegharkunik Province of Armenia. In response to the Armenian claim, the assistant to the president of Azerbaijan, Hikmet Hajiyev, stated that "Azerbaijan doesn't have F-16s – there aren't any on our soil or in our airspace". He claimed in turn that the aforementioned Su-25 as well as another Armenian Su-25 had crashed in the air while flying towards Azerbaijan. A week later on October 7, satellite imagery was published by The New York Times Visual Investigations Team confirming the presence of two F-16 Vipers at the airport. Following the publication of the satellite imagery, Azerbaijani president Ilham Aliyev conceded the official position regarding the F-16s' presence and that they had arrived in the country during military exercises prior to the war, but claimed they were not participating in combat.

In August 2021, IATA announced a newly assigned code of “GNJ”, which will reflect the city's new name. The former code of “KVD” refers to the city's previous name, Kirovabad.

== Facilities ==
The airport resides at an elevation of 1,083 feet (330 m) above mean sea level. It has two runways designated 12L/30R with an asphalt/concrete surface measuring 3,300 by 44 metres (10,827 ft × 144 ft) and non-operational 12R/30L with a concrete surface measuring 2,490 by 40 metres (8,169 ft × 131 ft). The runway designated 12R/30L has long been non-operational due to lack of maintenance and navigation equipment. Renovation and reconstruction of this concrete runway is needed due to occasional military usage of the airport.

== Airlines and destinations ==
Airlines	Destinations
Aeroflot	Moscow–Sheremetyevo
AJet	Istanbul–Sabiha Gökçen
Azerbaijan Airlines	Moscow–Vnukovo, Nakhchivan; Seasonal: Saint Petersburg
Pegasus Airlines	Istanbul–Sabiha Gökçen
Turkish Airlines	Istanbul
Ural Airlines	Moscow–Domodedovo
Utair	Moscow–Vnukovo

== Statistics ==
Traffic by calendar year. Official ACI Statistics
	Passengers	Change from previous year	Aircraft operations	Change from previous year	Cargo (metric tons)	Change from previous year
2012	259,451	N.D.	2,814	N.D.	917	N.D.
2013	345,055	▲32.99%	3,052	▲8.46%	883	▼3.71%
2014	329,156	▼4.61%	3,060	▲0.26%	721	▼18.35%
Source: Airports Council International. World Airport Traffic Reports (Years 2012, 2013, and 2014)

== See also ==
- Transport in Azerbaijan
- List of airports in Azerbaijan
