= Transport in Azerbaijan =

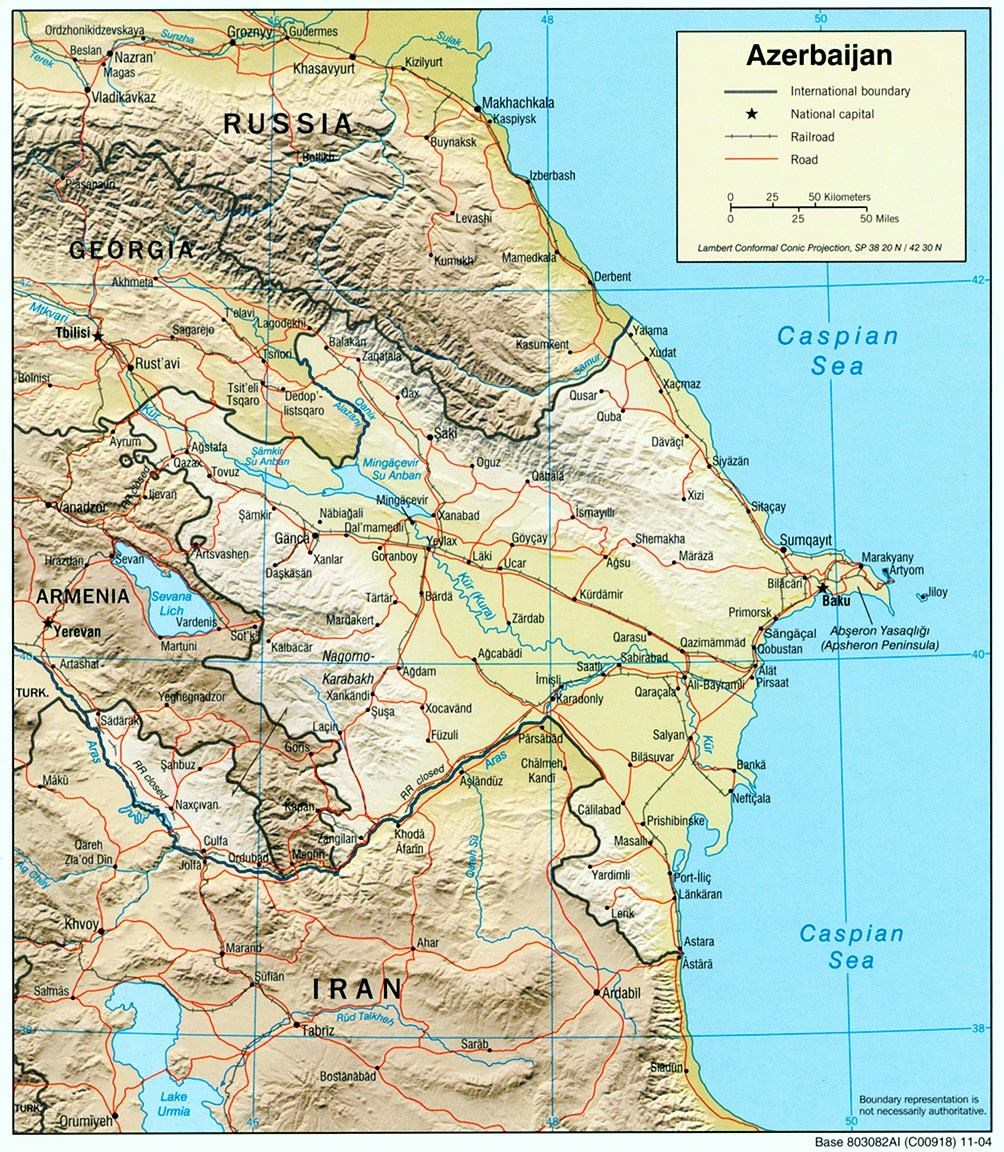
Azerbaijan geopolitical map with rail and road network

The transport in Azerbaijan involves air traffic, waterways and railroads. All transportation services in Azerbaijan except for oil and gas pipelines are regulated by the Ministry of Transportation of Azerbaijan Republic.

== Railways ==
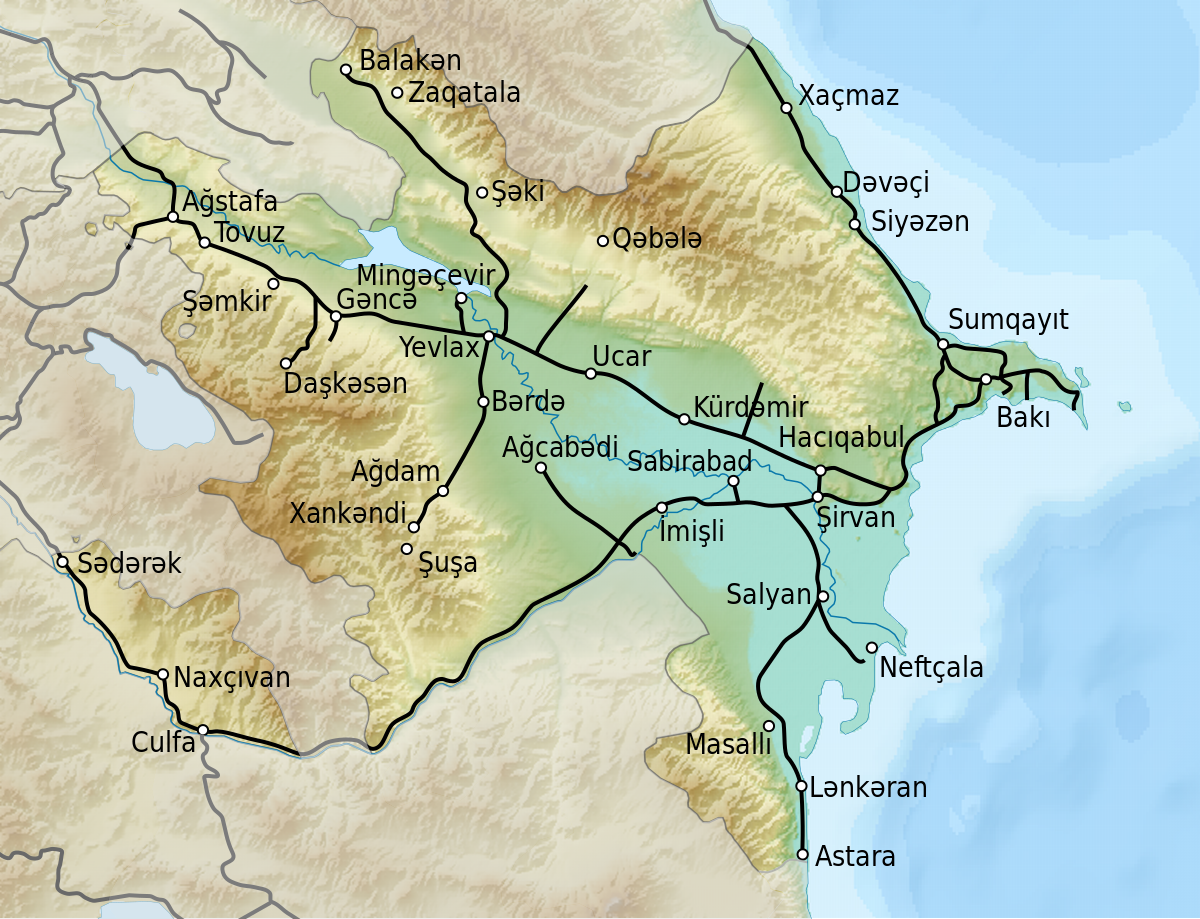
Azerbaijan Railways map (current)

There are 2,932 km (1,822 mi) of rail tracks out of which only 2,117 km (1,315 mi) are in common carrier service and 810 km (500 mi) are industrial lines.

Total: 2,932 km (1,822 mi) (2013)
Country comparison to the world: 59
Broad gauge: 1,520 mm (4 ft 11 27/32 in) gauge

=== Metro ===
Currently, the only metro system in Azerbaijan is the Baku Metro, located in Baku, the country's capital. New plans to open metro systems in the most populated and developed cities of Azerbaijan were unveiled. Sumgayit, Nakhchivan and Ganja all plan to have subway systems in the future.

== Roadways ==
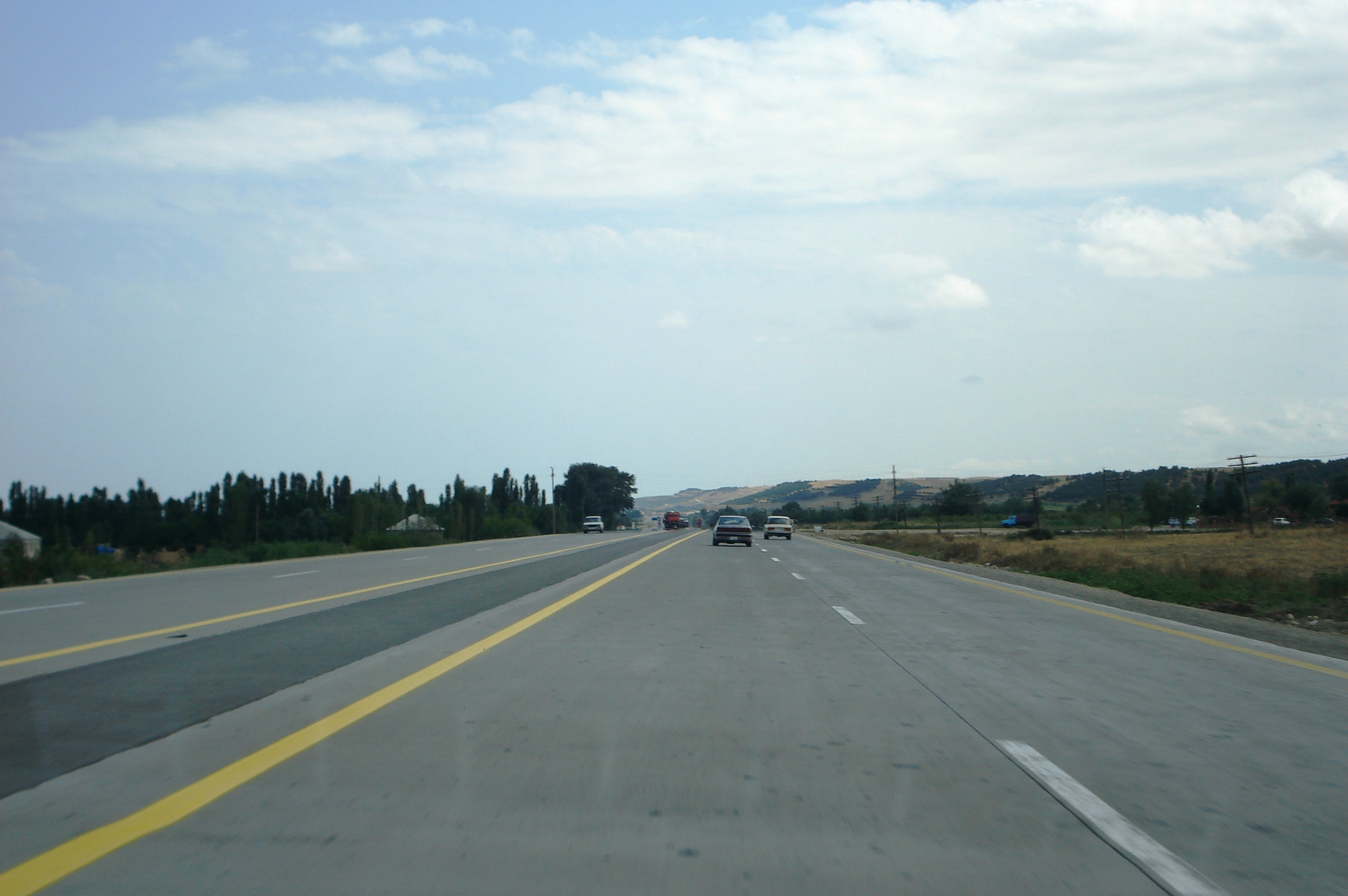
M2 Azerbaijan

There are about 25,000 kilometres of roads in Azerbaijan, serving domestic cargo traffic and providing access to international main highways. Highways are mostly in fair condition and need an upgrade to international standards in a view to accommodating growing transit traffic. Main and rural roads are in poor condition and in urgent need of rehabilitation and maintenance. The total vehicle fleet in Azerbaijan was about 517,000 in 2004, with about 49 private passenger cars per 1,000 inhabitants, which is quite low compared to European benchmarks but rapidly increasing due to the fast economic growth. Road transport accounted for 54% of all freight in 2003, up from about 48% in 1999.

=== International highways ===
Main highways carrying international traffic are the Baku–Alat–Ganja–Qazakh–Georgian Border corridor (Azerbaijani section of TRACECA corridor) with a length of 503 km and the so-called North–South Transport Corridor that stretches out from the Russian to the Iranian border along 521 km. Road connections are disrupted with Armenia because of the unresolved conflict regarding the possession of the Nagorno-Karabakh. Travel between the mainland and the detached exclave of Nakhchivan is made by air or by road through Iran. Nakhchivan has a 9-kilometre strategic border with Turkey.

== Pipelines ==
Map of Baku–Tbilisi–Ceyhan pipeline. The South Caucasus Pipeline runs parallel.

Baku is the centre of major oil- and gas-producing regions, and major long-distance pipelines radiate from the region's oil fields to all neighbouring areas. Pipelines are generally high-capacity lines and have diameters of either 1,020 or 1,220 millimetres. The main petroleum pipeline was completed in 2005 under American pressure to limit Russian and Iranian influence in the area. It runs from Baku via Tbilisi to Ceyhan in Turkey, therefore the acronym BTC pipeline. It made partly obsolete the old Soviet pipeline pumping crude oil from the onshore and offshore Caspian fields near Baku west across Azerbaijan and Georgia to the port of Batumi, where the oil is either exported in its crude form or processed at Batumi's refinery. Two natural gas lines parallel the old petroleum line as far as Tbilisi, where they turn north across the Caucasus Mountains to join the grid of natural gas pipelines that supply cities throughout Russia and Eastern Europe.

Condensate 89 km; gas 3,890 km; oil 2,446 km

== Ports and harbours ==
Sea and water cargo transportation have vital importance for Azerbaijan, especially in regions where road and rail connections are disputed. Azerbaijan has direct maritime connections only with other Caspian littoral states (Iran, Kazakhstan, Russia, and Turkmenistan). However, the Volga–Don Canal provides maritime access to the high seas. The main activity is the transport of cargo, mainly of oil and oil products. Shipping regions are the Caspian, Black, Mediterranean, and Marmara Seas. The main shipping company owes 72 ships, 37 of which are tankers (including 1 water carrier).

Baku International Marine Trade Port is the largest port on the Caspian Sea. Its ferry terminal underwent a major reconstruction supported by a US$16.2 million loan from EBRD. It is now able to handle 30 million tons of freight a year. The Caspian Sea provides vital transport links with other countries and is being used to ship oil until various pipeline projects are completed.

In 2014, Azerbaijan stated it would seek to ease transportation on the Caspian Sea due to increased demand by its neighbouring states.

On June 4, 2004, the Ministry of Transportation of the Republic of Azerbaijan established the Maritime Administration. As the regulatory authority in maritime transport, its functions include participating in the formulation of state policy, regulating transport demand of goods and passengers and for other types of maritime transport services, as well as implementing state programs, concepts, and projects for the development of maritime transport.

- Ports and harbors: Alat, Baku, Dubandi, Lankaran

=== Merchant marine ===
Total: 305 ships
Ships by type: general cargo 40, oil tanker 48, other 217

Country comparison to the world: 53

== Airports ==
There are regular passenger flights between Azerbaijan and former Soviet countries, UK, Germany, France, Austria, Italy, Israel, Iran, Pakistan, Turkey, UAE, United States, China, Georgia and cargo flights to UAE, Turkey, Luxembourg, Germany, China, Kyrgyzstan, Afghanistan, and Iraq. The national airline is Azerbaijan Airlines (AZAL). There are 5 international airports located in Baku, Ganja, Nakhchivan, Lankaran and Zaqatala. Heydar Aliyev International Airport in Baku reopened in 1999 after a US$64 million upgrade and extension financed by Turkish company Enka. The airport can now handle 1,600 passengers an hour. The new runways are also able to serve jumbo jets. The complete overhaul of the international airport in Nakhchivan was completed in May 2004. The US$32 million reconstruction project of Ganja Airport has been launched by the Government and was completed by mid-2006. In 2008, two more airports were opened in Azerbaijan. The Lankaran International Airport is located in the southern part of Azerbaijan, Zaqatala Airport is in the north-west of Azerbaijan territory.

Airports: 37
Country comparison to the world: 107

=== Airports – with paved runways ===
Total: 30
Over 3,047 m: 5
2,438 to 3,047 m: 5
1,524 to 2,437 m: 13
914 to 1,523 m: 4
Under 914 m: 3

=== Airports – with unpaved runways ===
Total: 7
Under 914 m: 7

== Heliports ==
Total: 4

== See also ==
- Azerbaijan
- Economy of Azerbaijan
