= Azerbaijan's construction in areas gained in the Second Nagorno-Karabakh War =

Azerbaijan re-established authority over part of the Nagorno-Karabakh region in 2020 following the Second Nagorno-Karabakh War, and re-established control over the entire region in 2023 following the 2023 Azerbaijani offensive in Nagorno-Karabakh.

The region was previously de facto controlled by the unrecognized Republic of Artsakh from 1991 to 2023 and was inhabited by 150,000 people who were ethnic Armenians; the entire Armenian population was forced to flee in the 2023 expulsion of Nagorno-Karabakh Armenians.

Following the resumption of Azerbaijani control, Azerbaijan launched efforts aimed at building infrastructure in the territory and repopulating it with Azerbaijanis. Branded as "the Great Return" program, the government project faces several challenges, including concerns about Armenian heritage sites, questions over transparency and labor conditions, and limited international support amid unresolved peace talks with Armenia.

The first phase of the program is from 2022 to 2026; it covers the Karabakh Economic Region and East Zangezur Economic Region.

== Background ==
Following the dissolution of the Soviet Union, the First Nagorno-Karabakh War took place from 1988 to 1994, in which the Nagorno-Karabakh Autonomous Oblast of Azerbaijan, which had a primarily Armenian population, unilaterally declared independence from Azerbaijan as the Republic of Nagorno-Karabakh (later renamed Republic of Artsakh), supported by Armenia. The Azerbaijani population was forced to flee; according to the Azerbaijani government at the time of the ceasefire in 1994 there were about 250,000 refugees in Azerbaijan from the war.

Azerbaijan recovered many of its territories during and after the Second Nagorno-Karabakh War, which culminated by the ceasefire deal on 9 November 2020. The ceasefire allowed rehabilitation to begin in places where Azerbaijan re-established authority, many of which had been practically leveled since Azerbaijan lost control of them in the 1990s.

The region was fully recaptured by Azerbaijan in the 2023 Azerbaijani offensive in Nagorno-Karabakh. This resulted in a flight of Nagorno-Karabakh Armenians, in which nearly the entire population of Nagorno-Karabakh fled the region for neighboring countries, primarily Armenia.

== Azerbaijani Program ==
Following the resumption of Azerbaijani control, Azerbaijan started the First State Program on the Great Return to the Territories of the Republic of Azerbaijan Liberated from Occupation (Azerbaijani: Azərbaycan Respublikasının işğaldan azad edilmiş ərazilərinə Böyük Qayıdışa dair I Dövlət Proqramı), or simply Great Return (Azerbaijani: Böyük qayıdış), a program to reconstruct infrastructure in the region and repopulate the region with Azerbaijanis.

On 16 November 2022, the President of Azerbaijan Ilham Aliyev approved the First State Program on the Great Return to the Territories of the Republic of Azerbaijan Liberated from Occupation, for a duration lasting from 2022 to 2026.

At the 11th Session of the World Urban Forum, President of the Republic of Azerbaijan Ilham Aliyev claimed that huge mine pollution is the main challenge, which slowing down reconstruction and return of internally displaced individuals.

As of May 2025, 13,745 internally displaced persons in Azerbaijan have settled in the region under the program. Azerbaijan aims to settle 150,000 people in the region by 2027.

== By city ==
=== Agdam ===
On 20 November 2020, the city of Aghdam and its surrounding district were returned to Azerbaijan as part of the ceasefire agreement. Plans were announced to construct a 44.5-kilometer-long highway linking Agdam to the city of Barda. On 28 May 2021, President Aliyev laid the foundation stone for the project.

=== Fuzuli ===
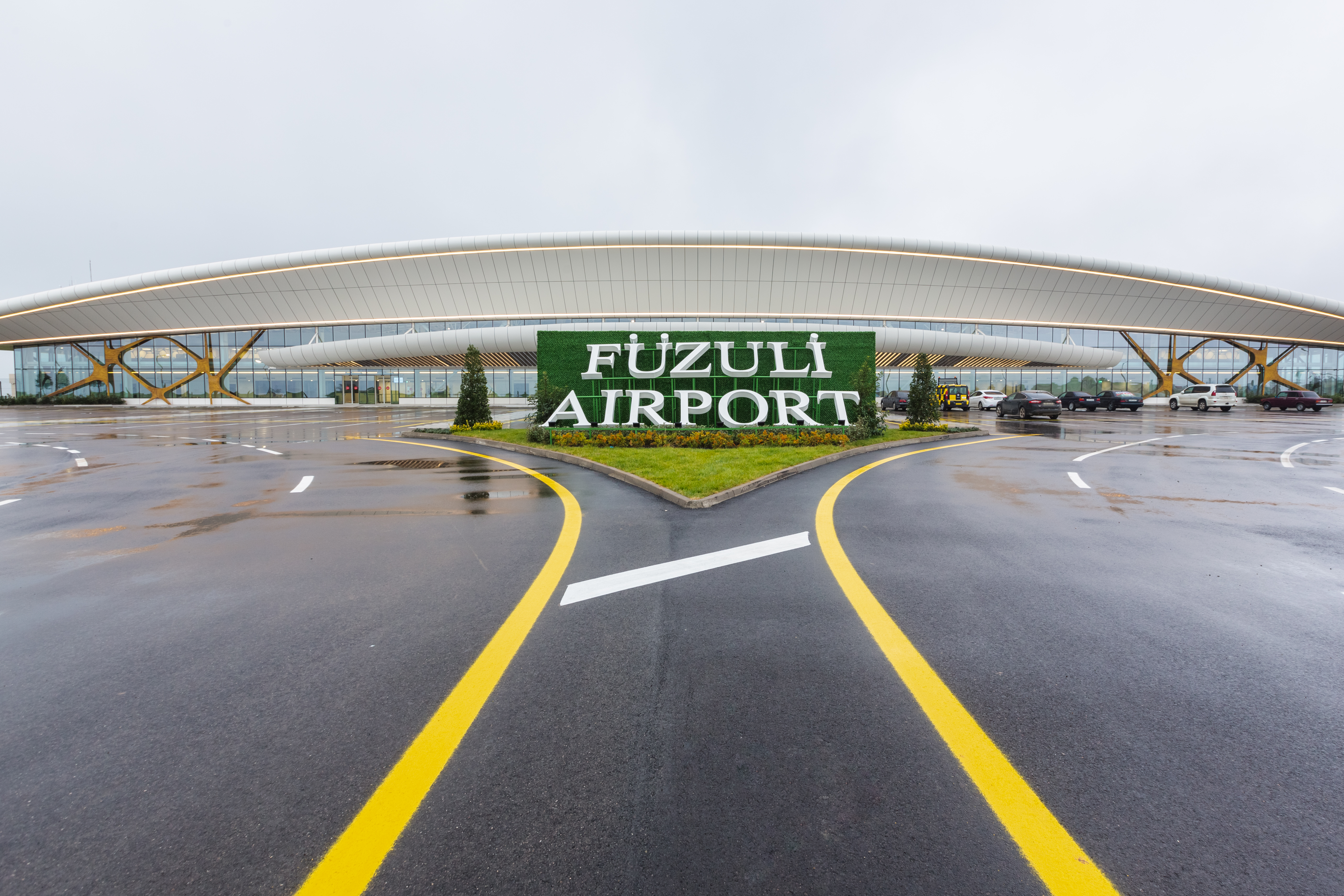
Entrance to Fuzuli International Airport.

On 16 November 2020, the foundation stone for the construction of a highway linking the cities of Fuzuli and Shusha was laid. The highway was planned to integrate into a wider scheme to construct a highway to the municipality of Ahmadbeyli. Plans indicate that the road would be 101.5 km in length and 37.7m wide. On 26 October 2021, Fuzuli International Airport was inaugurated. Turkish companies constructed the airport at a cost of 75 million manats ($44 million). The first flight test to the airport took place on August 22, 2021.

=== Hadrut ===
Construction works in Hadrut, which came under Azerbaijan's control on October 9, 2020, began with the restoration of roads. On March 15, 2021, President Aliyev laid the foundation for the Fuzuli–Hadrut highway with a length of 13 km. It has been noted that the Hadrut–Jabrayil–Shukurbayli, which passes through Jabrayil District, will be connected to the Hajigabul–Minjivan–Zangazur highway in Shukurbeyli. The road, which is planned to be 43 km in length, will have 4 lanes and road bridges built along. Moreover, it was reported that the construction of the 18-kilometer-long Tugh–Hadrut highway was underway.

=== Kalbajar ===
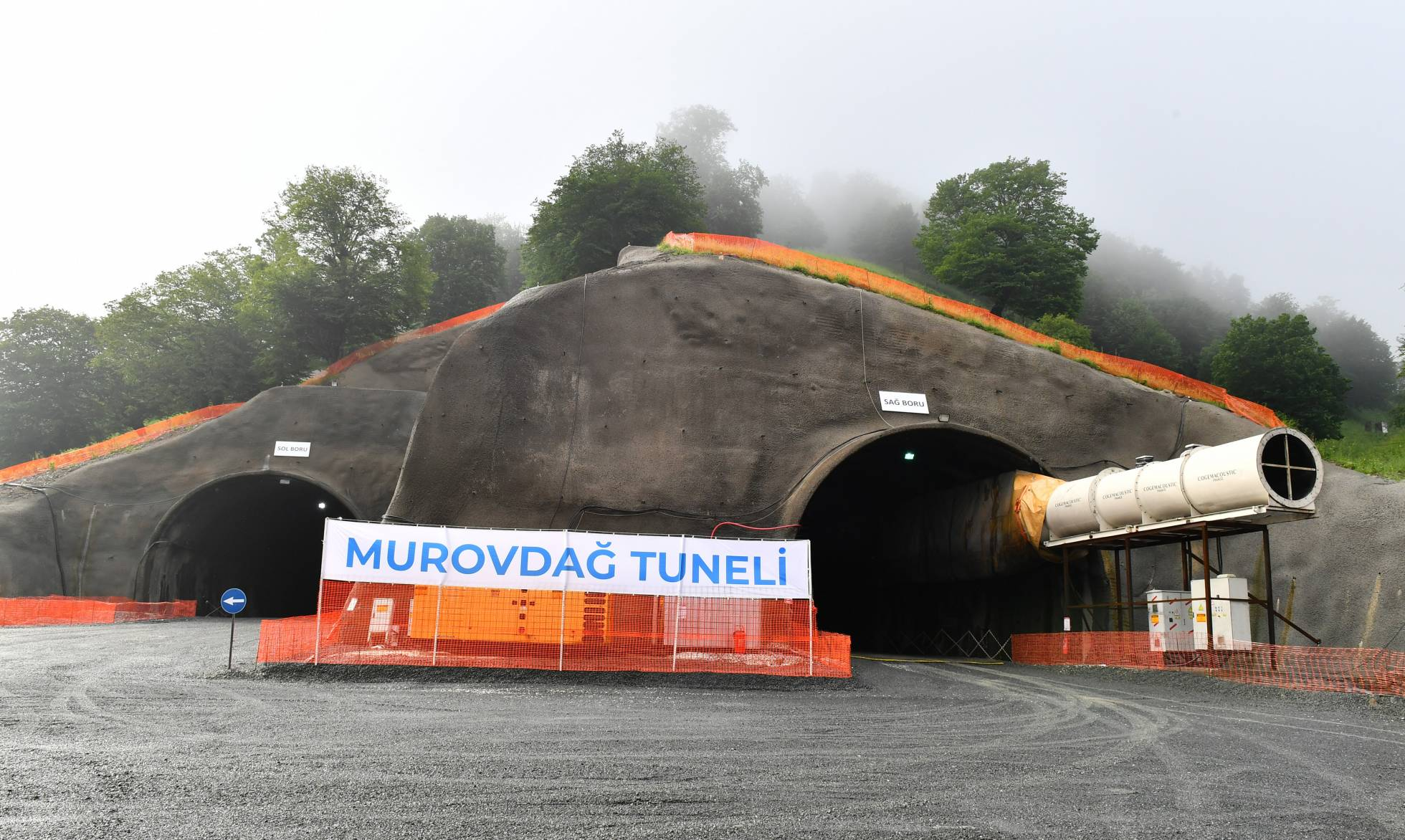
Murovdag Tunnel under construction.

On 23 July 2021, construction began on the construction of a highway linking Toganali, Istisu and Kalbajar. The 81-kilometer long highway would connect Goygol District and Kalbajar District.

On 16 August 16, 2021, the foundation stone for the Murovdag tunnel was laid. The tunnel will form part of an 11.6-kilometer highway.

On 16 August 16, 2021, the foundation stone for a 3.4-kilometer-long tunnel was laid. It is planned that the tunnel will be a part of a 72.8-kilometer-long highway that is intended to link Kalbajar with Lachin. A second connection between Kalbajar and Lachin districts is also planned - the Istisu–Minkend road.

=== Lachin ===
Lachin International Airport, is an airport under construction in Lachin, Azerbaijan. The construction of the airport began in May 2021 and is expected to be completed in 2024. It will be the highest altitude airport in Azerbaijan at 1,700-1,800 meters above sea level.

=== Qubadli ===
On 25 October 2021, the foundation stone for a highway connecting Khanlig and Qubadli was laid and a substation of Azerenerji in Qubadli was opened. On the same day, a 50-meter-high radio and television broadcasting tower was erected in Khanlig village. Two 76-kilometer-long power lines (Qubadli-1 and Qubadli-2) were installed from Shukurbayli and Jabrayil substations to connect Qubadli to the general energy system of Azerbaijan.

In September 2026, construction began on a 3.34-hectare plot for the first residential complex, which includes 21 apartment buildings with 176 apartments.

=== Shusha ===
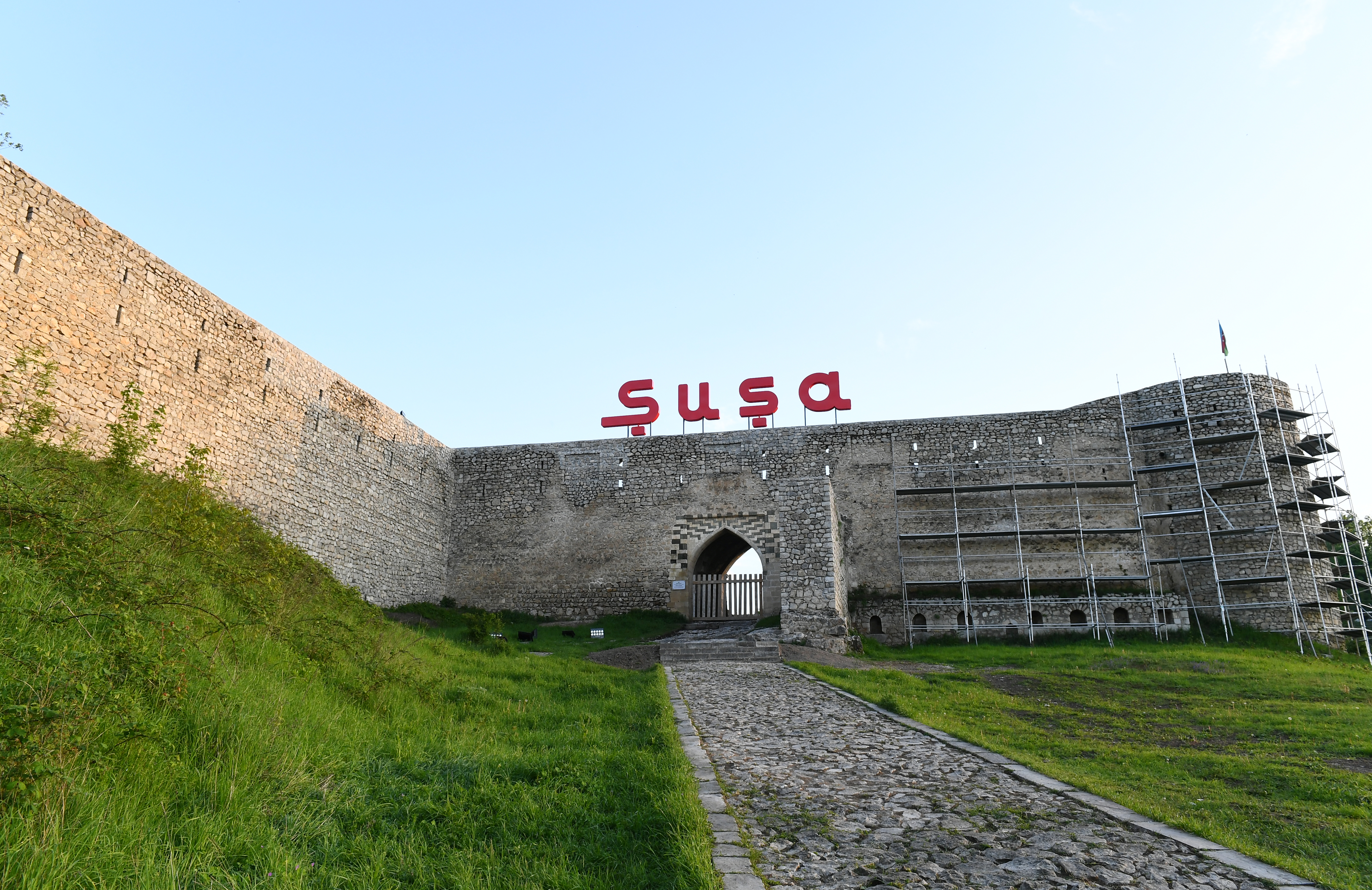
Shusha fortress being renovated in May 2021.

Following Azerbaijan taking control of the city in the Battle of Shusha and the subsequent end of the war, Azerbaijan's government embarked on a major construction plan to restore the city, attracting substantial criticism including due to a lack of transparency. Some former Azerbaijani residents of the city also expressed discontent with the demolition of buildings due to them wanting to return to their homes as well as due to their opinions not being taken into consideration. Among the buildings being demolished were those constructed by the Armenian authorities while they controlled the city, including a new parliament building, apparently in order to make room for the construction of a mosque.

In January 2021, plans were announced for the construction of a five-star hotel in the city of Shusha. Restoration of the Shusha fortress began in early February 2021.

In early May 2021, the government announced that it would commence repairs to Ghazanchetsots Cathedral which was twice struck with missiles by the Azerbaijaini military during the 2020 war.

In early June 2021, it was announced that three mosques in Shusha — Ashagi Govhar Agha, Yukhari Govhar Agha and Saatli — would be restored by the Heydar Aliyev Foundation. On June 22, the "Shusha City State Reserve Department" was established.

On January 14, 2021, restoration works began on Vagif Mausoleum and it was opened on August 29.

=== Zangilan ===
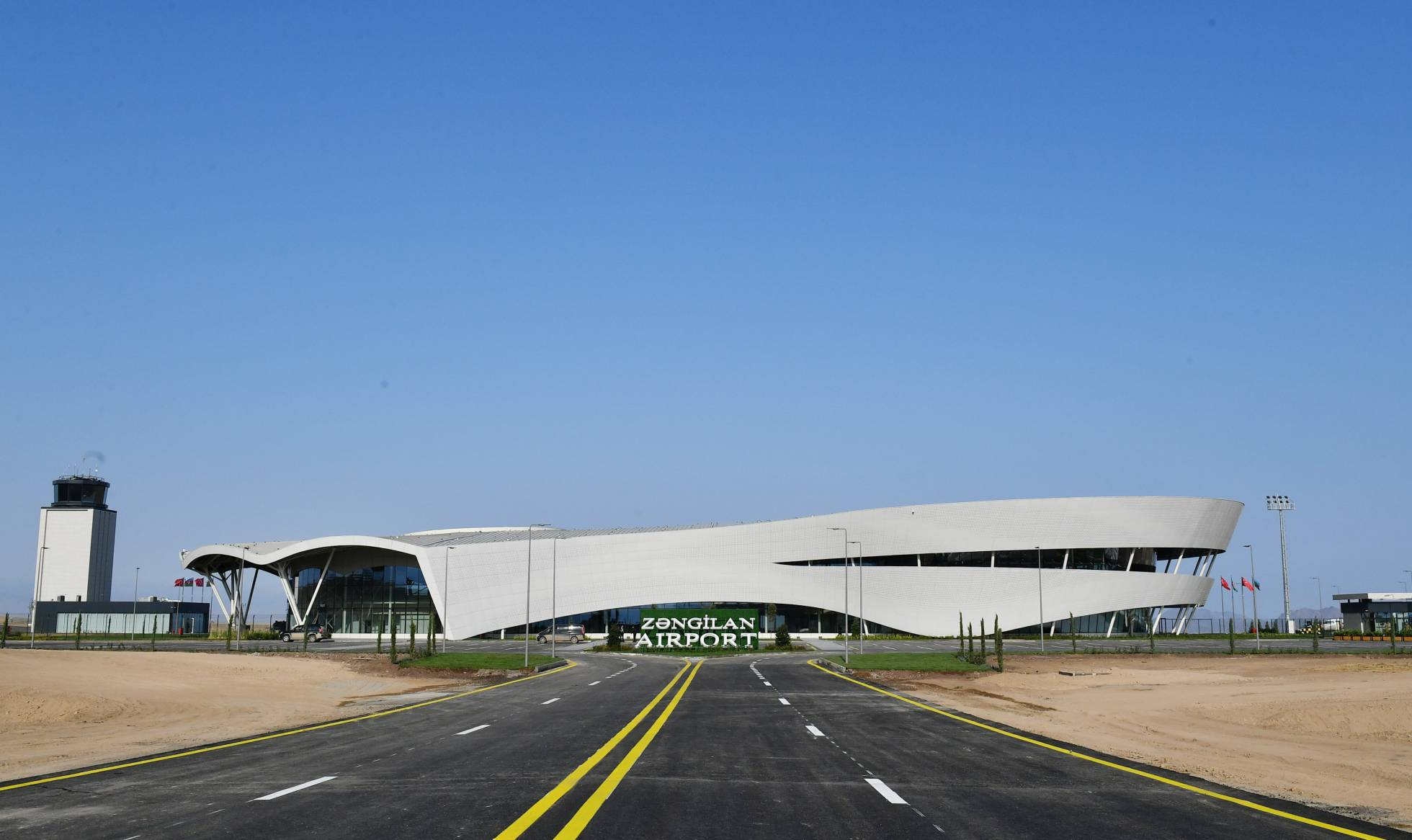
Zangilan International Airport.

On 14 February 14, 2021, the foundation stone of a railway line linking Horadiz, Zangilan and Agband was laid. In making the announcement, the President stated that was intended that the branch would connect Azerbaijan proper with the exclave of the Nakhchivan Autonomous Republic. It was not mentioned how such a line would traverse the territory of the Republic of Armenia.

On March 18, 2021, the "Brotherhood Garden" was opened in Agali village by delegations from the Turkish Ministerty of Agriculture and Forestry (Bekir Pakdemirli) and the Azerbaijani the Ministry of Agriculture of Azerbaijan.

On 1 May 2021, plans were announced for the construction of the Zangilan International Airport.

On 20 October 2021, the President signed an order to make an inventory of natural objects in the Basut-Chay State Reserve and to assess the environmental situation.

On 26 October 2021, the Presidents of Azerbaijan and Turkey announced plans to found an agro-park -"Dost" - to be constructed with the support of Turkey.

On 19 July 2022, the first residents returned to Ağalı village after 29 years. The village has a school, post office, health centre, bank, market and cafe. It is expected that 1300 people will live in the village

On 21 October 2022, Zangilan International Airport was inaugurated by President Aliyev of Azerbaijan and President Erdoğan of Turkey.

== International reaction ==
International support has remained limited because of Azerbaijan's authoritarian governance, stalled peace talks with Armenia, and weak transparency, leaving the project criticized as politically driven, socially misaligned, and financially controversial rather than genuinely restorative. Critics also note that the emphasis on "smart cities" and green branding often ignores displaced people’s real priorities, while environmental risks, labor abuses, and threats to Armenian cultural heritage further undermine its credibility. Historian Michael Rubin says Azerbaijan stages visits for journalists, diplomats, and analysts to Jewish and Christian figures and rebuilt towns in Nagorno-Karabakh to mislead outsiders, echoing how Saddam Hussein’s Iraq once courted the press to appear moderate.

Paul Gavan, PACE rapporteur on the 'Humanitarian consequences of the conflict between Armenia and Azerbaijan', stated in his report that:

The extent of damage to homes and cultural heritage in particular in the seven districts returned to Azerbaijan during and after the conflict is massive and shocking and will take many years and substantial resources to bring the area back to life. The first priority will be demining and then infrastructure has to be created, homes built, services provided, livelihoods created, and areas repopulated. The position is dramatic, and as one senior member of the international community commented to the rapporteur, “we should all have done more over the last 30 years to prevent this level of destruction”.

According to US Department of State Azerbaijani government is looking for new investments in the areas around Nagorno-Karabakh that were previously controlled by Armenia-backed separatists. Azerbaijan allocated US$1.3 billion from the budget for the rehabilitation and reconstruction of these lands. These funds will apparently be utilized to rehabilitate infrastructure, education, and healthcare sectors, as well as cultural and historical landmarks. Reconstruction is projected to continue in the future years, with specific financial provisions continuing to be made for demining, reconstructing, and resettling.

== Controversies ==
Azerbaijan's "Great Return" program has been characterized as ahistorical and expansionist by international critics and as a nationalist distraction by domestic critics. Other critics point out that the program does not offer the right of return to former ethnic Armenians who fled their homes in 2023.

The investigative journalist group Bellingcat used satellite imagery to reveal city-wide ransacking and the demolition of homes in the regional capital of Nagorno-Karabakh. Various Armenian cultural monuments in the captured areas have been partially or entirely destroyed during the reconstruction process, including Armenian cemeteries and homes bulldozed in the process of road construction, as well as an 18th/19th century Armenian church. Azerbaijan's modifications of the Ghazanchetsots Cathedral was met with criticism and concern by the United States Commission on International Religious Freedom and various Armenian groups alike as well.

== See also ==
- Refugees in Azerbaijan
- Flight of Nagorno-Karabakh Armenians
