= Malatkeşin =

- Location within Azerbaijan
- Coordinates: 39°05′59″N 46°39′08″E
- Country: Azerbaijan
- District: Zangilan
- Time zone: UTC+4 (AZT)

Malatkeşin (Malatkeshin) is a village located in the administrative-territorial district of the city of Zangilan, Zangilan district of Azerbaijan. The village is situated on the bank of Okhchuchay River.

== History ==
According to the “Code of statistical data of the Transcaucasian region population, extracted from the family lists of 1886”, in the village of Malatkeshin, Pirchivan rural district, Zangezur district, Elizavetpol province, there were 115 dym and 565 Azerbaijanis (in the source listed as "Tatars") who were Shiites by religion. The entire population was landowner peasants.

According to the results of the Azerbaijani Agricultural Census of 1921, Malatkeshin, Zangilan rural district of Gubadli district, Azerbaijan SSR, was inhabited by 330 people (85 households), the predominant nationality was Azerbaijani Turks.

According to data as of 1 January 1933, Malatkeshin was part of Pirchivan rural district of Zangilan district of Azerbaijan SSR. The population was 450 people, 113 households (97 common and 16 individual, 226 men and 224 women). The entire population of the village council (98.7%), which also consisted of villages: Genlik, Malatkeshin, Pirchivan I, Pirchivan II, Tagly, was made up by Turks (Azerbaijani).

=== Karabakh conflict ===
During the First Karabakh War in 1993, the village was occupied by Armenian armed forces. After the occupation, the village was destroyed. Residential buildings, a village school, a mosque and a cemetery were destroyed. On 22 October 2020, during the Second Karabakh War, the President of Azerbaijan announced the liberation of the village of Malatkeshin by the armed forces of Azerbaijan.
