= Fuzuli International Airport =

International airport in Fuzuli, Azerbaijan

Fuzuli International Airport Füzuli beynəlxalq hava limanı
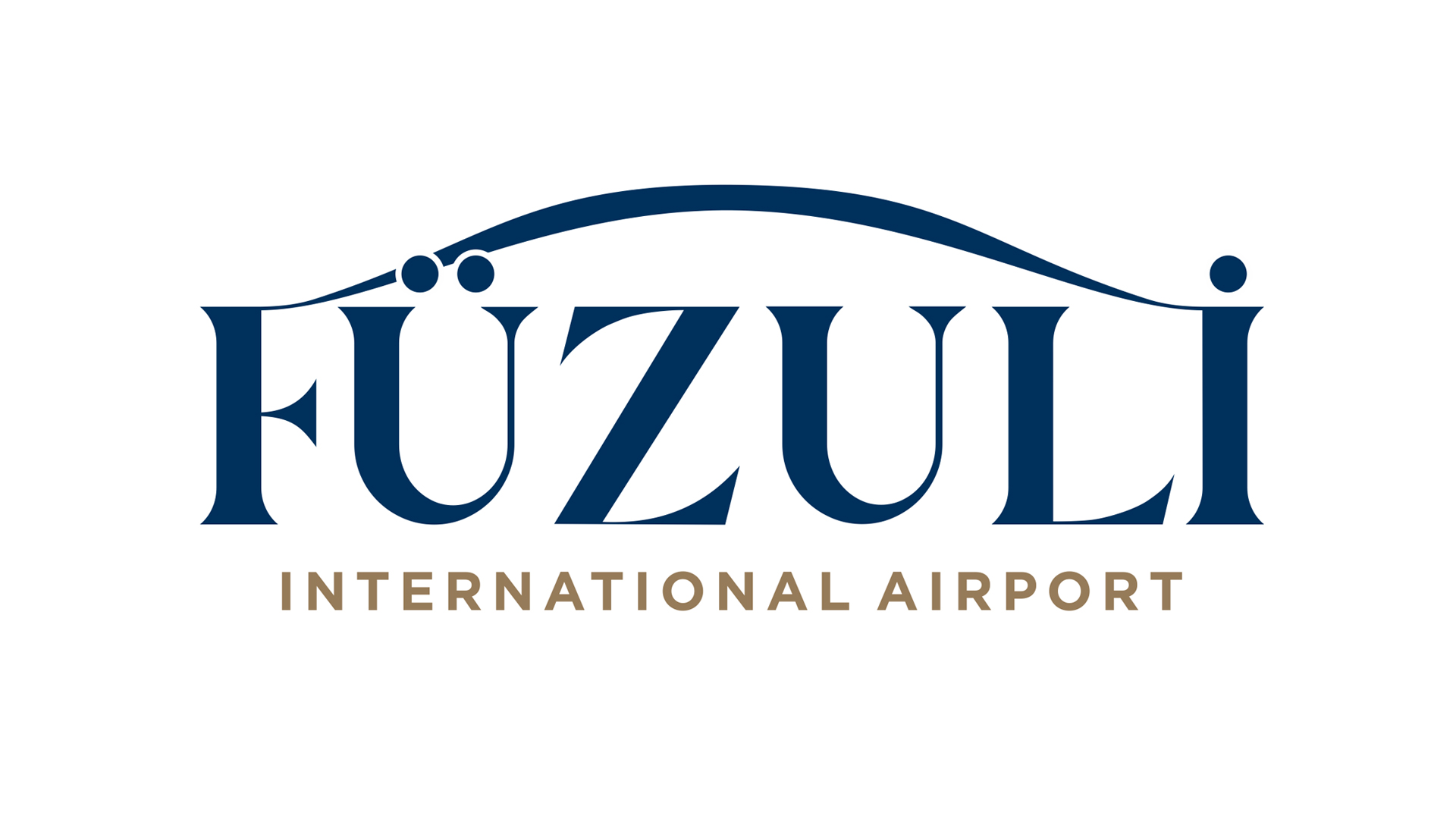

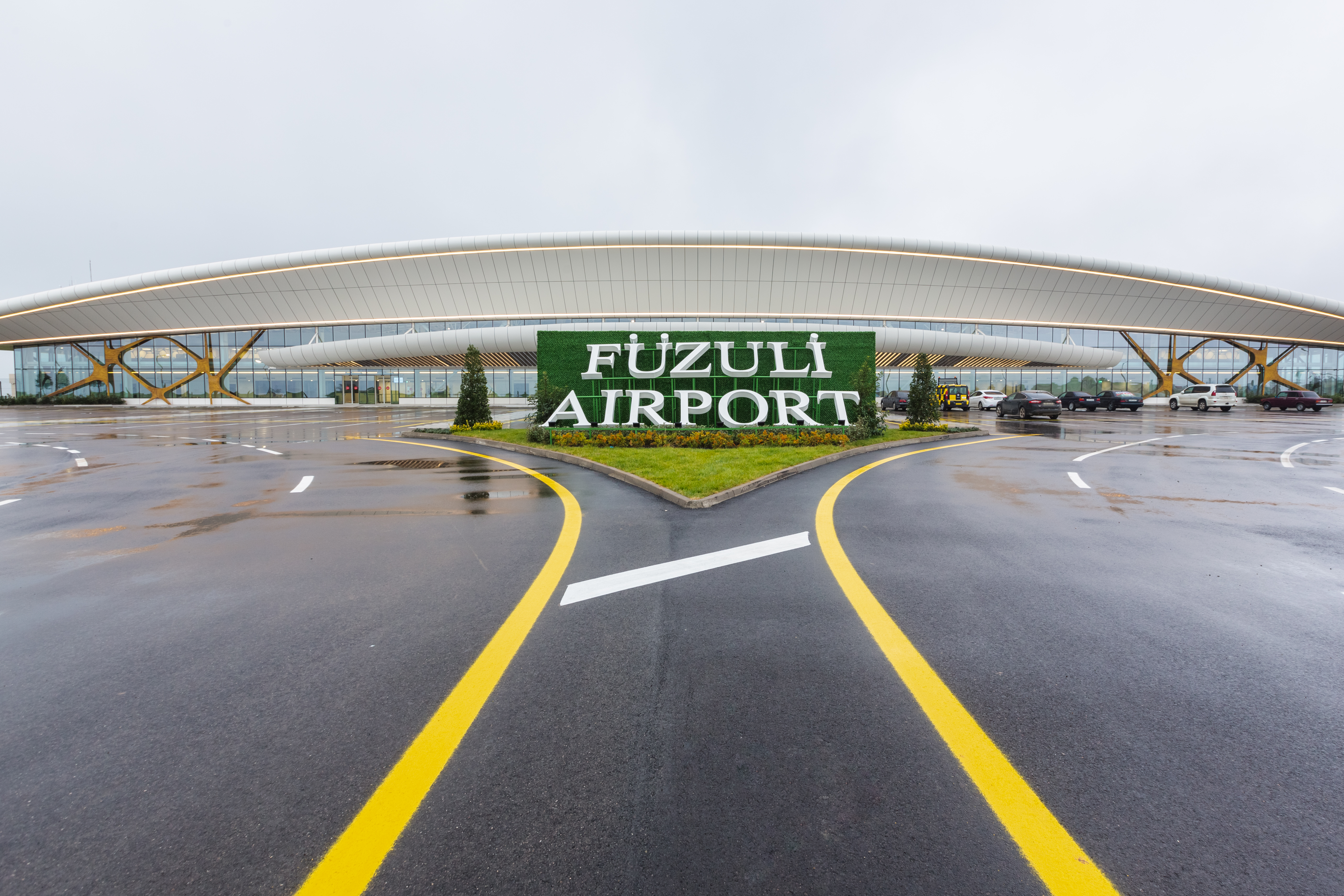
- IATA: FZL; ICAO: UBBF

Summary
- Owner: Government of Azerbaijan
- Operator: Government
- Serves: Fuzuli
- Location: Fuzuli, Azerbaijan
- Opened: 26 October 2021; 5 years ago
- Coordinates: 39.594400°N 47.196600°E

Map
- Shown in Azerbaijan Fuzuli International Airport (Europe)

Fuzuli International Airport (Azerbaijani: Füzuli Beynəlxalq Hava Limanı) is an airport in the city of Fuzuli in Azerbaijan. It is one of the country's seven international airports. The airport was built on an airdrome that had been abandoned for almost 30 years and was surrounded by former minefields. It was constructed at a cost of 75 million manats ($44 million).

== History ==
In the late 1980s, the town of Fuzuli had some 17,000 residents. During the First Nagorno-Karabakh War, on 24 August 1993, the Azerbaijani Armed Forces were forced to withdraw from Fuzuli. The city was reduced to a ghost town shortly before its fall to the armed forces of the Republic of Artsakh and of Armenia. Twenty-eighty years later, on 17 October 2020, it was re-captured by the armed forces of Azerbaijan. Following this, the Azerbaijani government initiated a process to clear the city and the surrounding areas from landmines.

On 26 November 2020, the Azerbaijani Ministry of Transport, Communications and High Technologies reported that the International Civil Aviation Organization (ICAO) had accepted the appeal of the State Civil Aviation Administration to include six airports, including the airfield in Fuzuli, in its catalog of international airport codes. In January 2021, President Ilham Aliyev issued a decree on the construction of an international airport in Fuzuli. On 14 January, the groundbreaking ceremony for the future airport took place. Turkey-based companies were involved in the construction of the airport. The completed runway was first used on 5 September 2021, when an Airbus A340-500 aircraft operated by Azerbaijan Airlines and a Boeing 747-400 cargo aircraft operated by Silk Way Airlines, landed at the airport.

It's reported the airport apron covers an area of 60,000 m^{2}, allowing up to eight aircraft to park. The runway is 3,000 meters long and 60 meters wide. The airport terminal is able to serve 200 passengers per hour. Since its opening, the airport has received various aircraft types including the Airbus A330, Airbus A340, Boeing 787 and Il-96.

The airport was inaugurated on 26 October 2021 by the presidents of Azerbaijan (Ilham Aliyev) and Turkey (Recep Tayyip Erdogan).

== Airlines and destinations ==
Airlines	Destinations
Azerbaijan Airlines	Baku

== Gallery ==
Control tower

Terminal building

== See also ==
- Lachin International Airport
- Zangilan International Airport
- Azerbaijani construction in areas gained in the 2020 Nagorno-Karabakh war
