= Zangilan International Airport =

International airport in Zangilan, Azerbaijan

Zangilan International Airport Azerbaijani: Zəngilan Beynəlxalq Hava Limanı
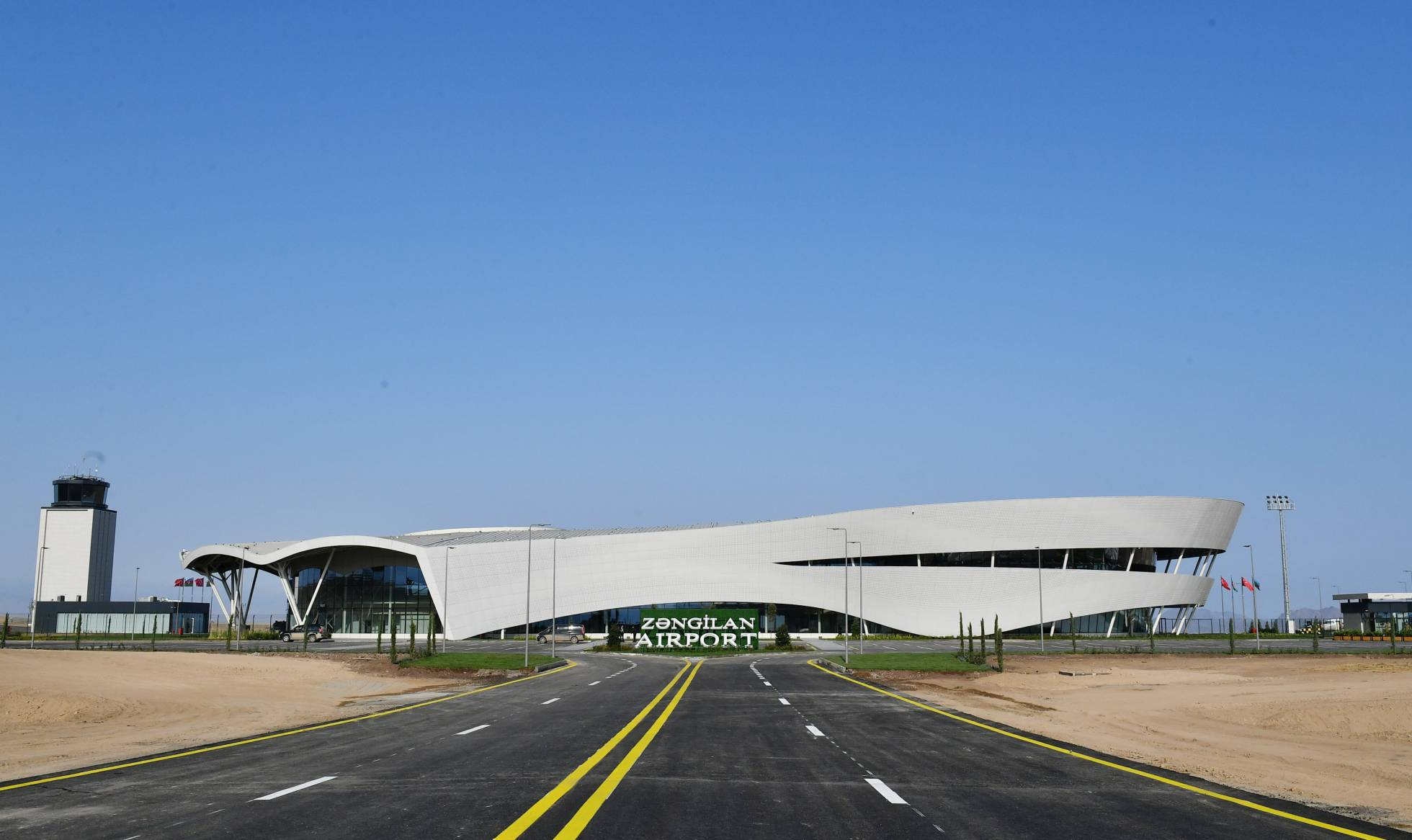
- IATA: ZZE; ICAO: UBBZ

Summary
- Owner: Government of Azerbaijan
- Operator: Government
- Serves: Zangilan
- Location: Zangilan, Azerbaijan
- Opened: October 20, 2022
- Coordinates: 39.094414°N 46.734098°E

Map

Runways
Direction	Length		Surface
Direction	ft	m	Surface
03/21	9,843	3,000	Asphalt/Concrete

Zangilan International Airport (Azerbaijani: Zəngilan Beynəlxalq Hava Limanı) is an airport in the city of Zangilan in Azerbaijan.

== History ==
The construction of the airport began in May 2021 and the airport was inaugurated on 20 October 2022 by the president of Azerbaijan, Ilham Aliyev, and the president of Turkey, Recep Tayyip Erdogan. It is one of the country's eight international airports.

== See also ==
- Fuzuli International Airport
- Lachin International Airport
- Azerbaijani construction in areas gained in the 2020 Nagorno-Karabakh war
