= Lachin International Airport =

International airport under construction in Lachin, Azerbaijan

Lachin International Airport Azerbaijani: Laçın Beynəlxalq Hava Limanı
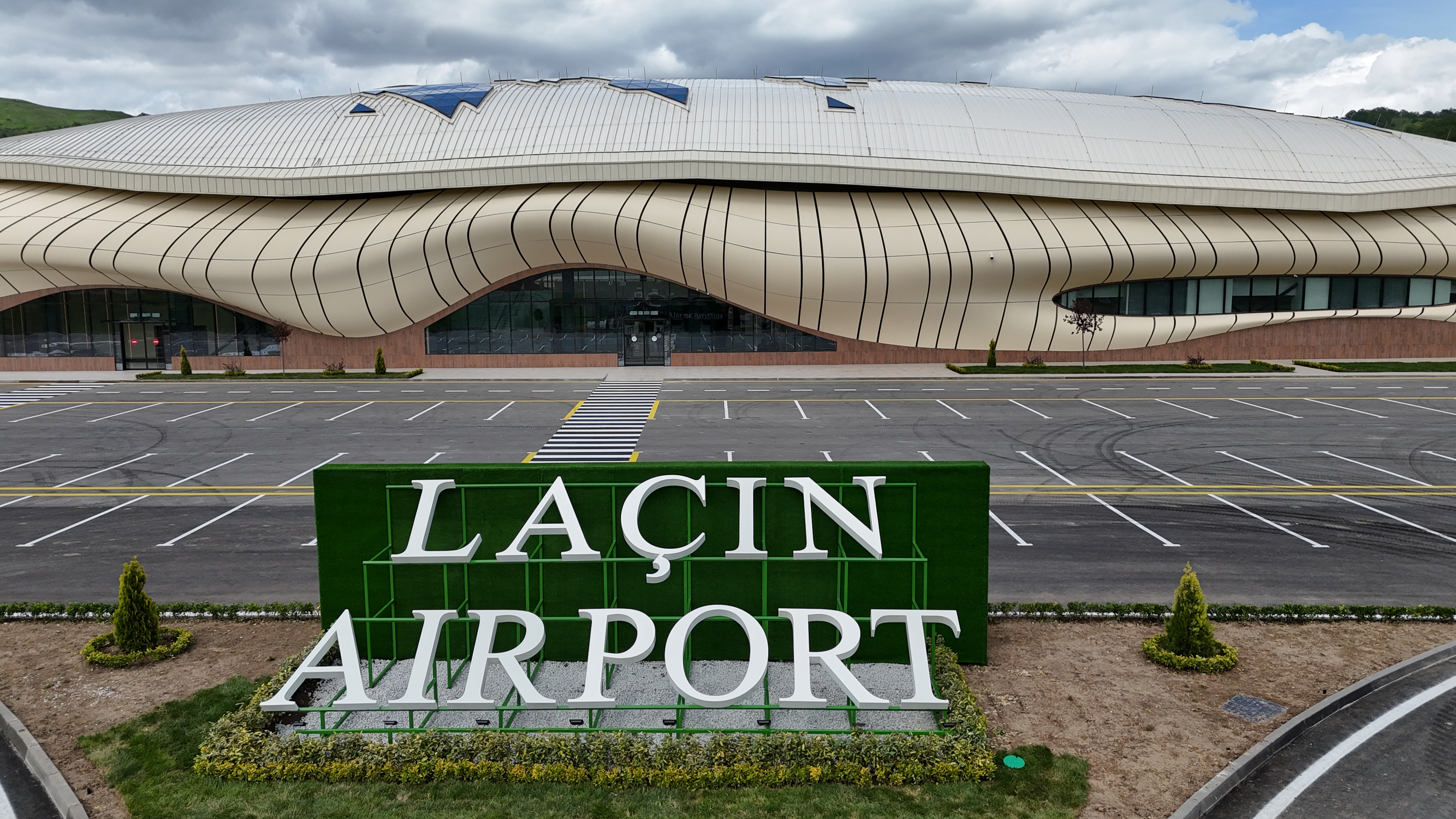
- IATA: LHL; ICAO: UBLC

Summary
- Owner: Government of Azerbaijan
- Operator: Government
- Serves: Lachin and Kalbajar
- Location: Lachin, Azerbaijan
- Opened: 28 May, 2025
- Coordinates: 39.886311°N 46.354288°E

Map

Runways
Direction	Length		Surface
Direction	m	ft	Surface
14/32	3,000	9,843	Asphalt/Concrete

Lachin International Airport (Azerbaijani: Laçın Beynəlxalq Hava Limanı) is an airport in Lachin, Azerbaijan.

== Development ==
The construction of the airport began in May 2021 and is expected to be completed in 2024. It will be the highest altitude airport in Azerbaijan at 1,700-1,800 meters above sea level. The Lachin International Airport will be Azerbaijan's third air harbor in the areas gained in the 2020 Nagorno-Karabakh war, in addition to the international airports in the Fuzuli and Zangilan districts. The airport is located at the Qorçu village of the Lachin district, slightly more than 30 and 60 kilometers from Lachin and Kalbajar cities, respectively, and about 70 kilometers from Shusha city. The airport was opened on May 28, 2025 with participation of presidents of Azerbaijan Ilham Aliev, Turkey Recep Tayyip Erdoğan and Pakistan Shehbaz Sharif.

== Gallery ==
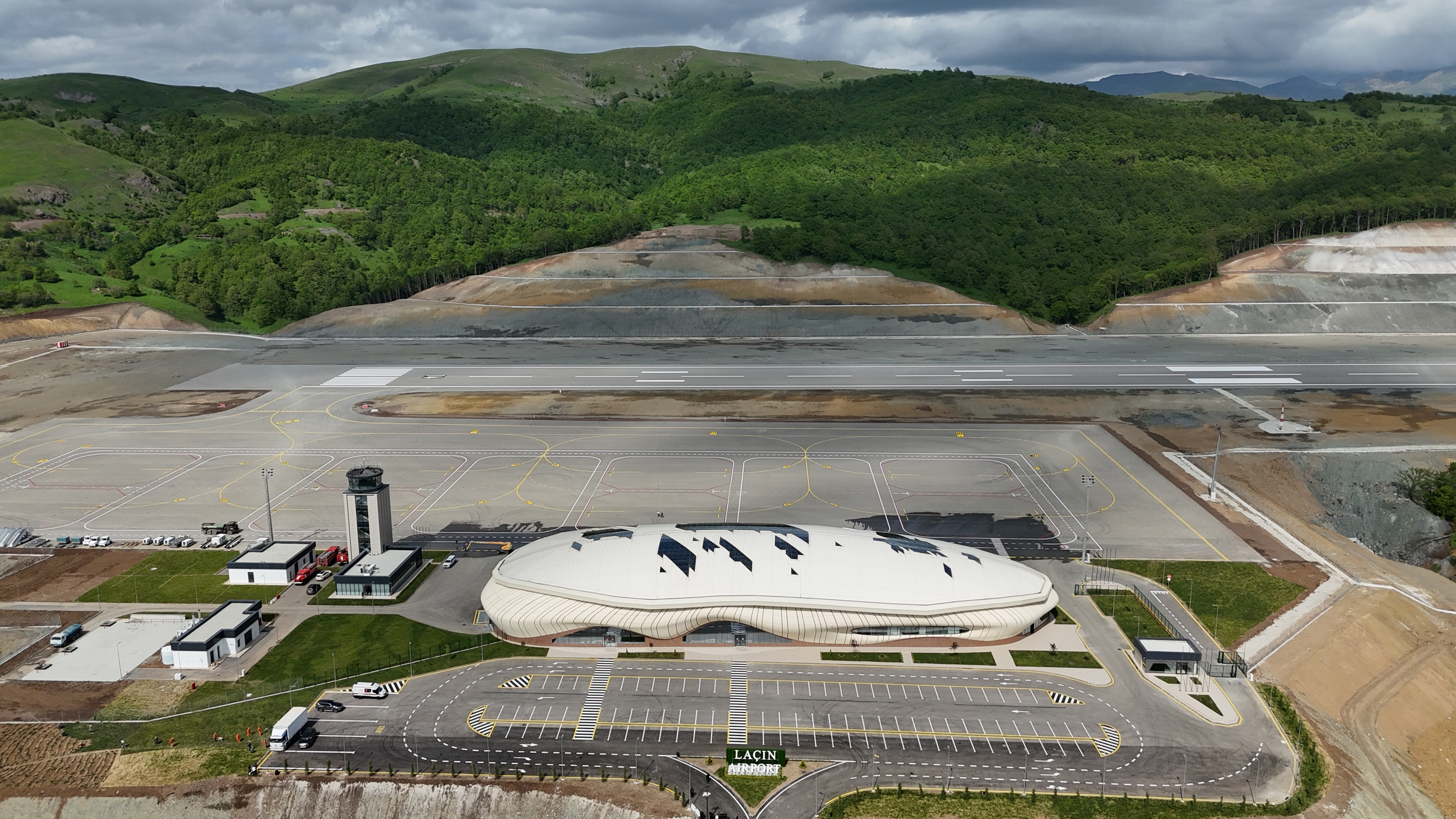

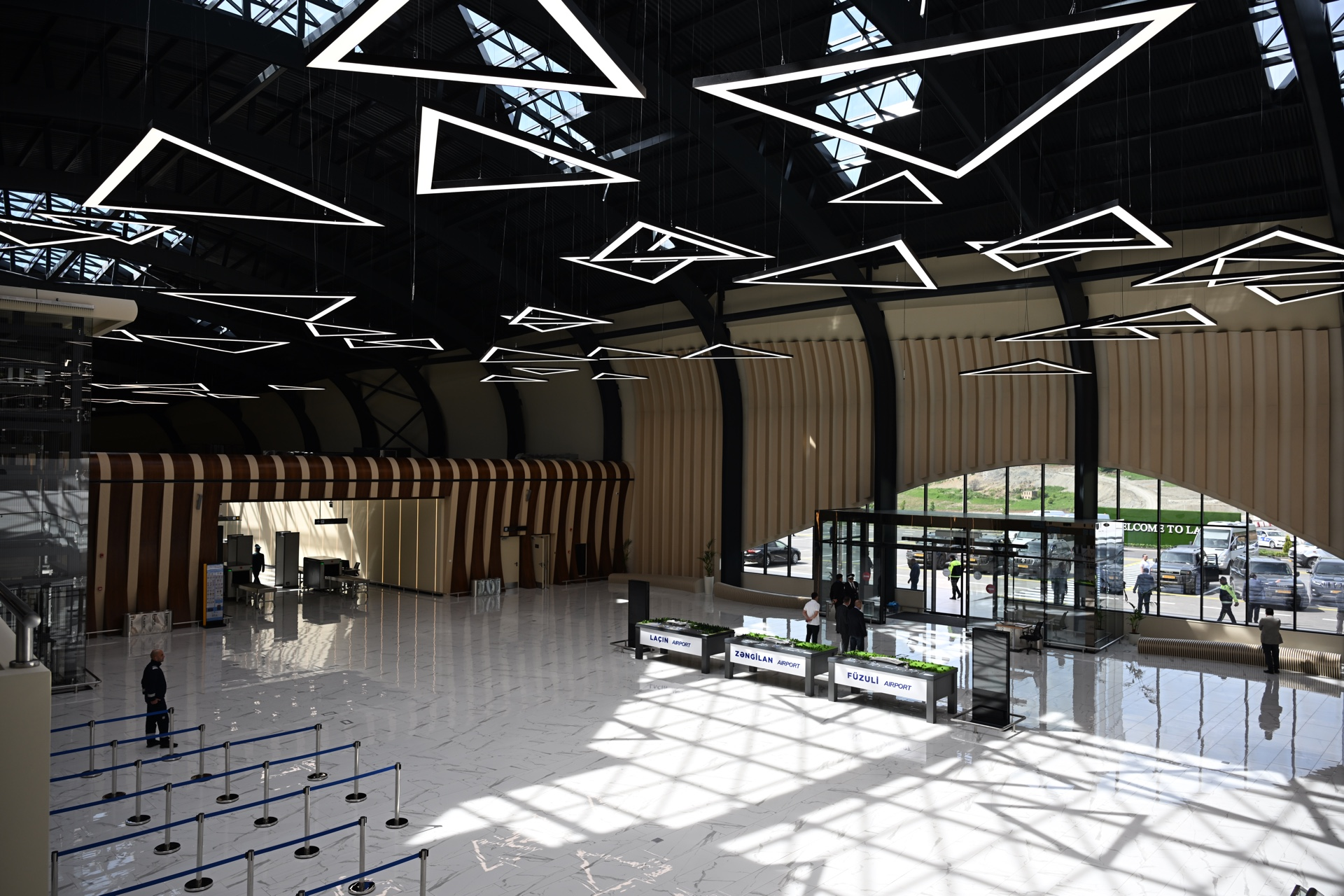

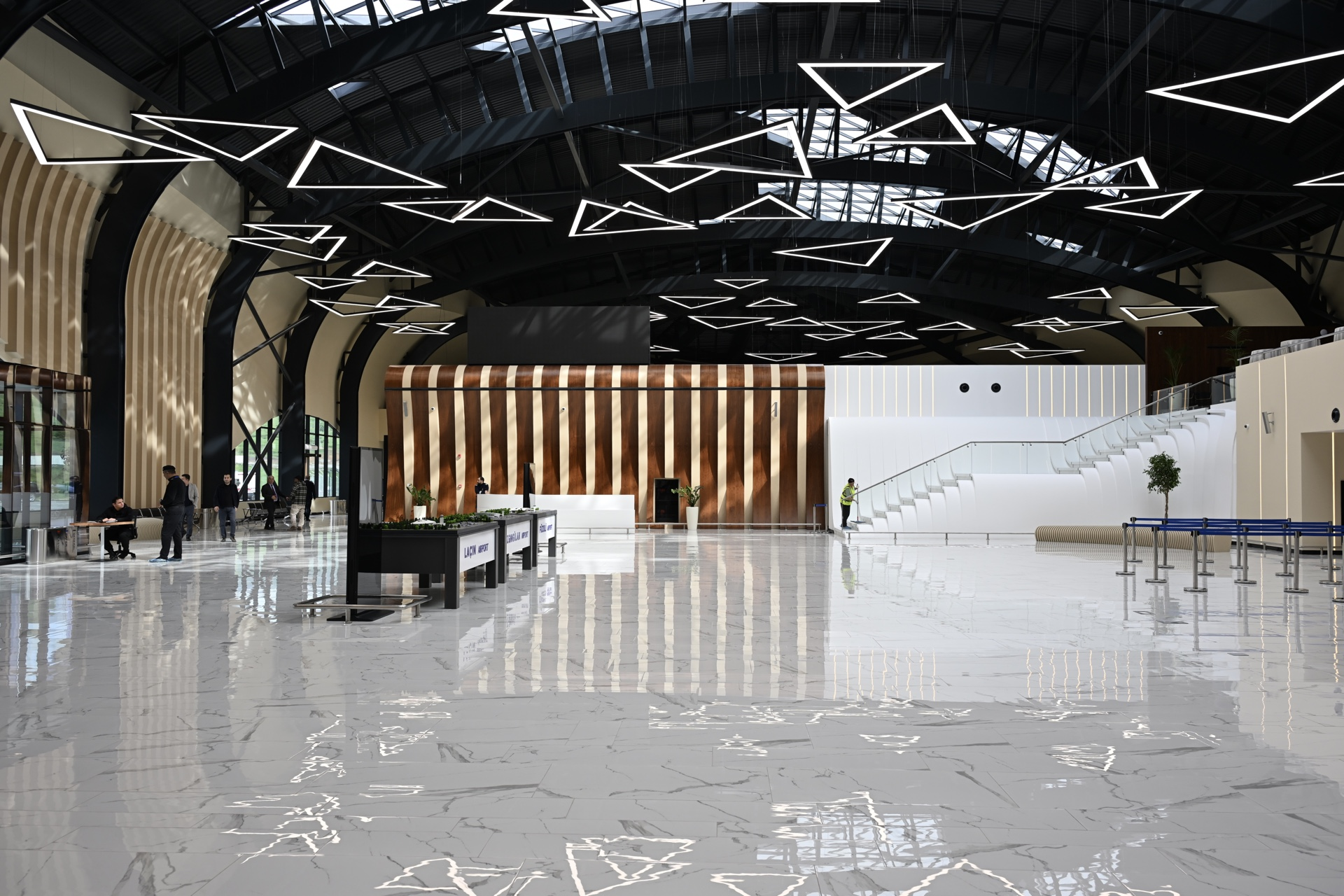

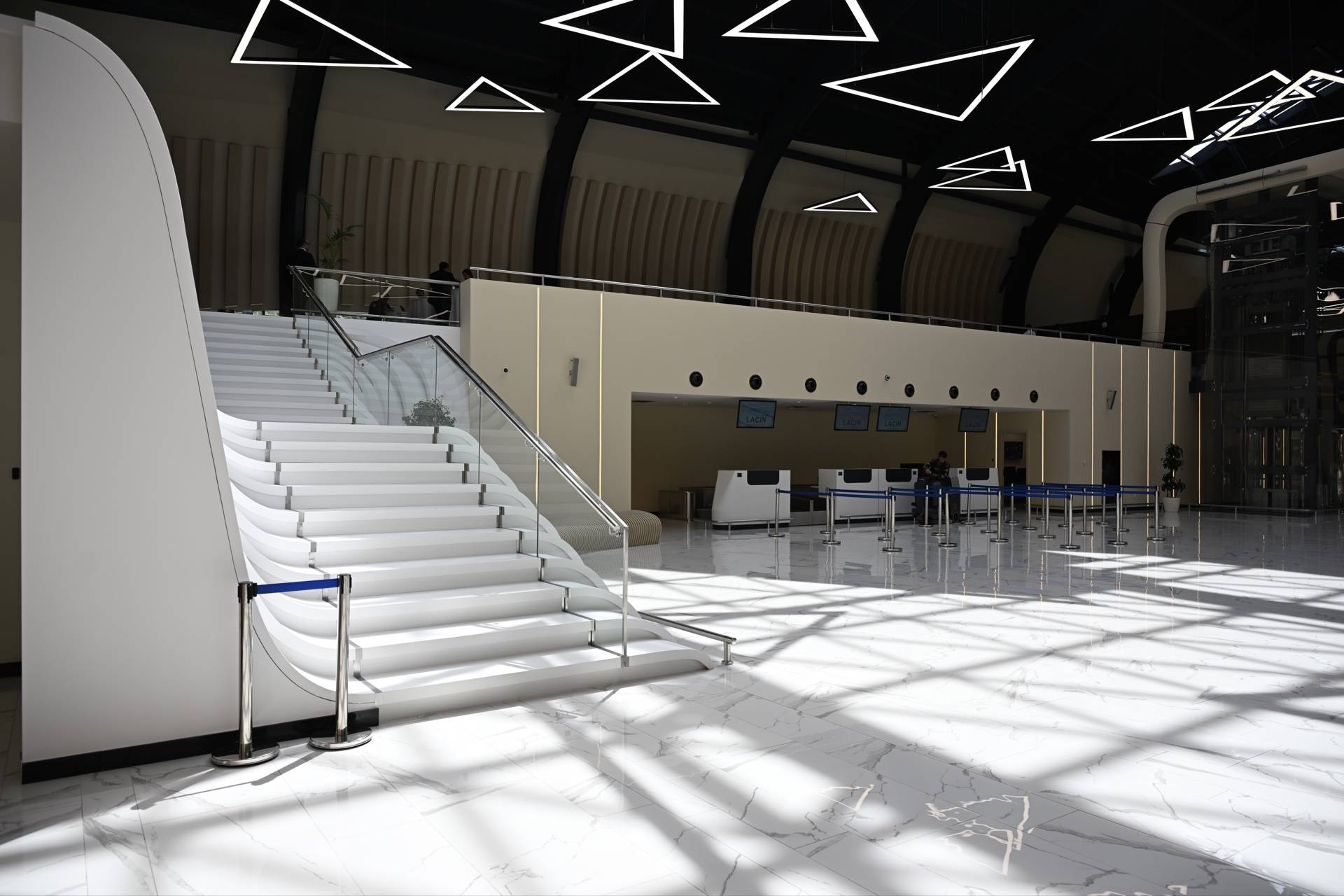

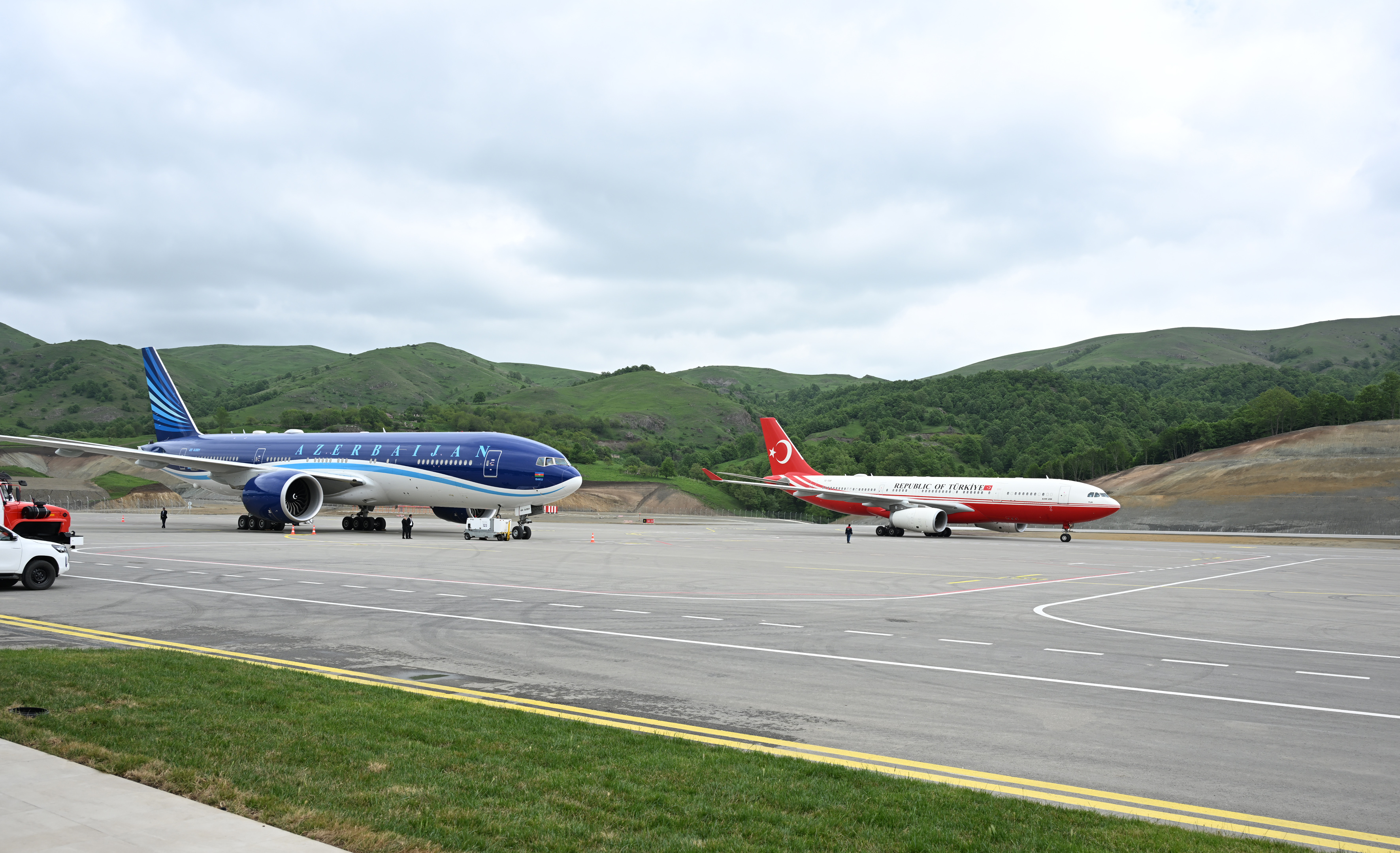

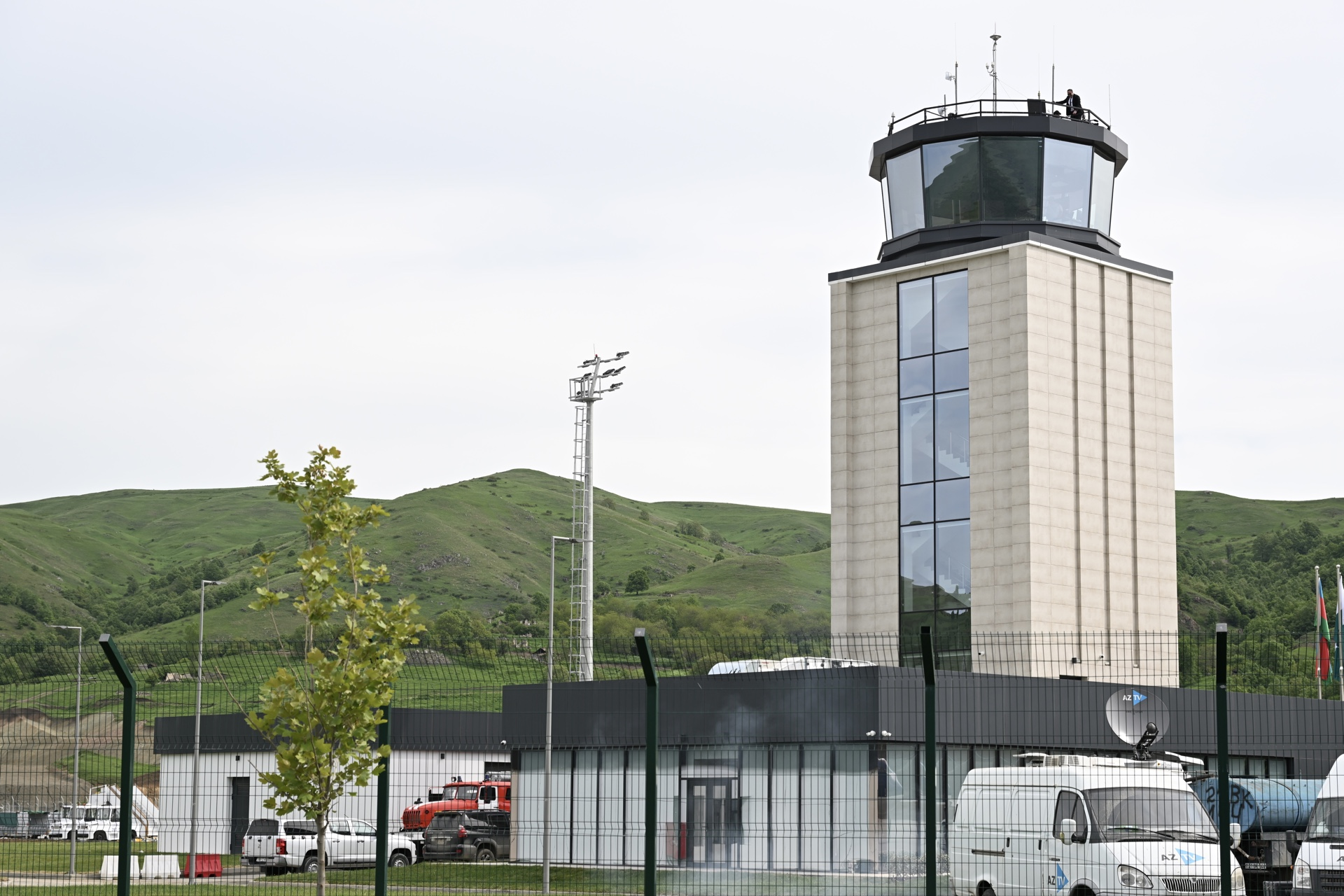

== See also ==
- Fuzuli International Airport
- Zangilan International Airport
- Azerbaijani construction in areas gained in the 2020 Nagorno-Karabakh war
