= Horadiz–Jabrayil–Zangilan–Aghband Highway =

Highway under construction in Azerbaijan

Horadiz–Jabrayil–Zangilan–Aghband highway

Route information
- Length: 149.9 km (93.1 mi)
- Existed: 26 October 2021–present

Major junctions
- NW end: Horadiz
- SE end: Aghband

Location
- Country: Azerbaijan

Highway system
- Roads in Azerbaijan

Horadiz–Jabrayil–Zangilan–Aghband highway (Azerbaijani: Horadiz–Cəbrayıl–Zəngilan–Ağbənd avtomobil yolu) is a highway under construction in Azerbaijan. It runs through territories regained by Azerbaijan and forms part of the transport corridor associated with the Zangezur corridor concept.

As of September 2025, the road was reported as 95% complete, with completion planned for the second half of 2026.

== History ==
The foundation ceremony for the highway took place on 26 October 2021, attended by the presidents of Azerbaijan and Turkey.

In September 2025, State Agency of Azerbaijan Automobile Roads reported that construction was 95% complete. A November 2025 report said the highway was expected to be completed in the second half of 2026.

== Route and structure ==
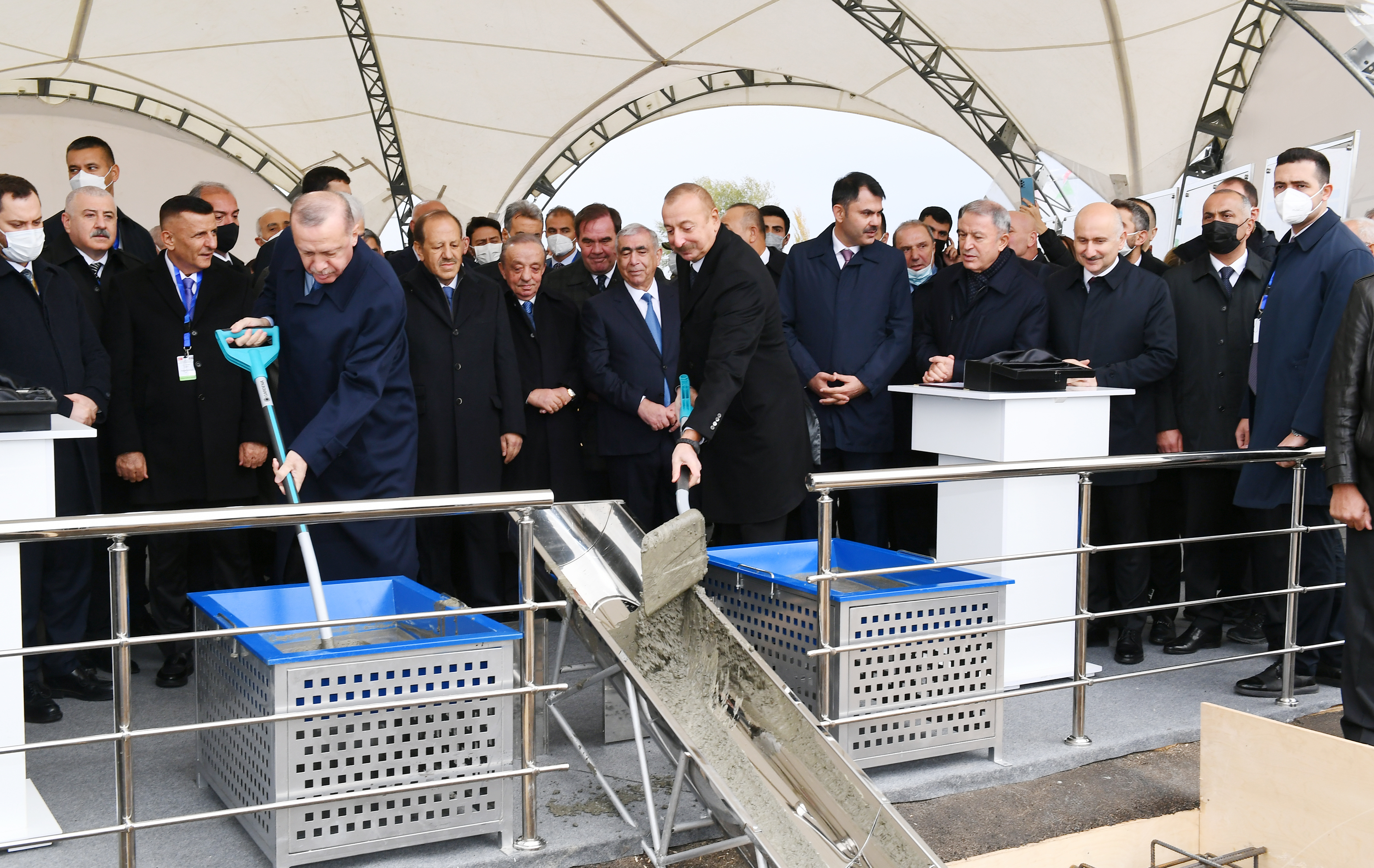
Recep Tayyip Erdoğan and Ilham Aliyev laying the foundation of the highway

The highway has a total length of 149.9 km, including a 123.6 km mainline section. It is being built to technical category I. According to official reporting, 78.5 km of the route is designed with six lanes and 45.1 km with four lanes.

The project includes tunnels, bridges, underpasses and other engineering structures along the route. Three tunnels are being built; excavation work in the tunnels was reported as complete by November 2025. The same report stated that 23 of 24 bridges had been completed, with work continuing on the remaining bridge.

A contractor identified in official reporting for works in the direction of Zangilan is Kalyon.
