= Qorçu =

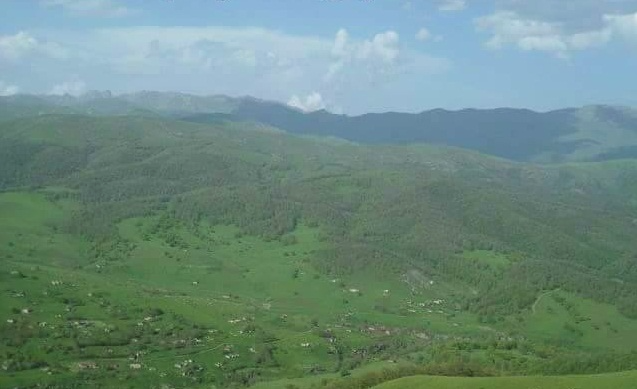

- Location within Azerbaijan Location within East Zangezur Economic Region
- Coordinates: 39°52′45″N 46°20′48″E
- Country: Azerbaijan
- District: Lachin

Population (2015)
  - Total: 8
- Time zone: UTC+4 (AZT)

Qorçu (Gorchu) is a village in the Lachin District of Azerbaijan. The village is 64 kilometres away from Lachin, and is 1,884 meters above sea level. It is located near a large forested area.

== History ==
The village was located in the Armenian-occupied territories surrounding Nagorno-Karabakh. It was occupied by Armenian forces in 1992 during the First Nagorno-Karabakh War. The village subsequently became part of the breakaway Republic of Artsakh as part of its Kashatagh Province, referred to as Haytagh (Armenian: Հայթաղ). It was returned to Azerbaijan as part of the 2020 Nagorno-Karabakh ceasefire agreement.

In August 2021, during his visit to the Lachin region, the president of Azerbaijan laid the foundation of the Lachin International Airport close to the village. It is expected to be finished in 2024.

== Economy and culture ==
The community was sustained by agriculture consisting mostly of livestock. Prior to occupation, there was a high school, a library, and a post office in the village.

== Demographics ==
The village had a population 654 in 1992.
