= Zangilan =

City in Azerbaijan

Zangilan Zəngilan
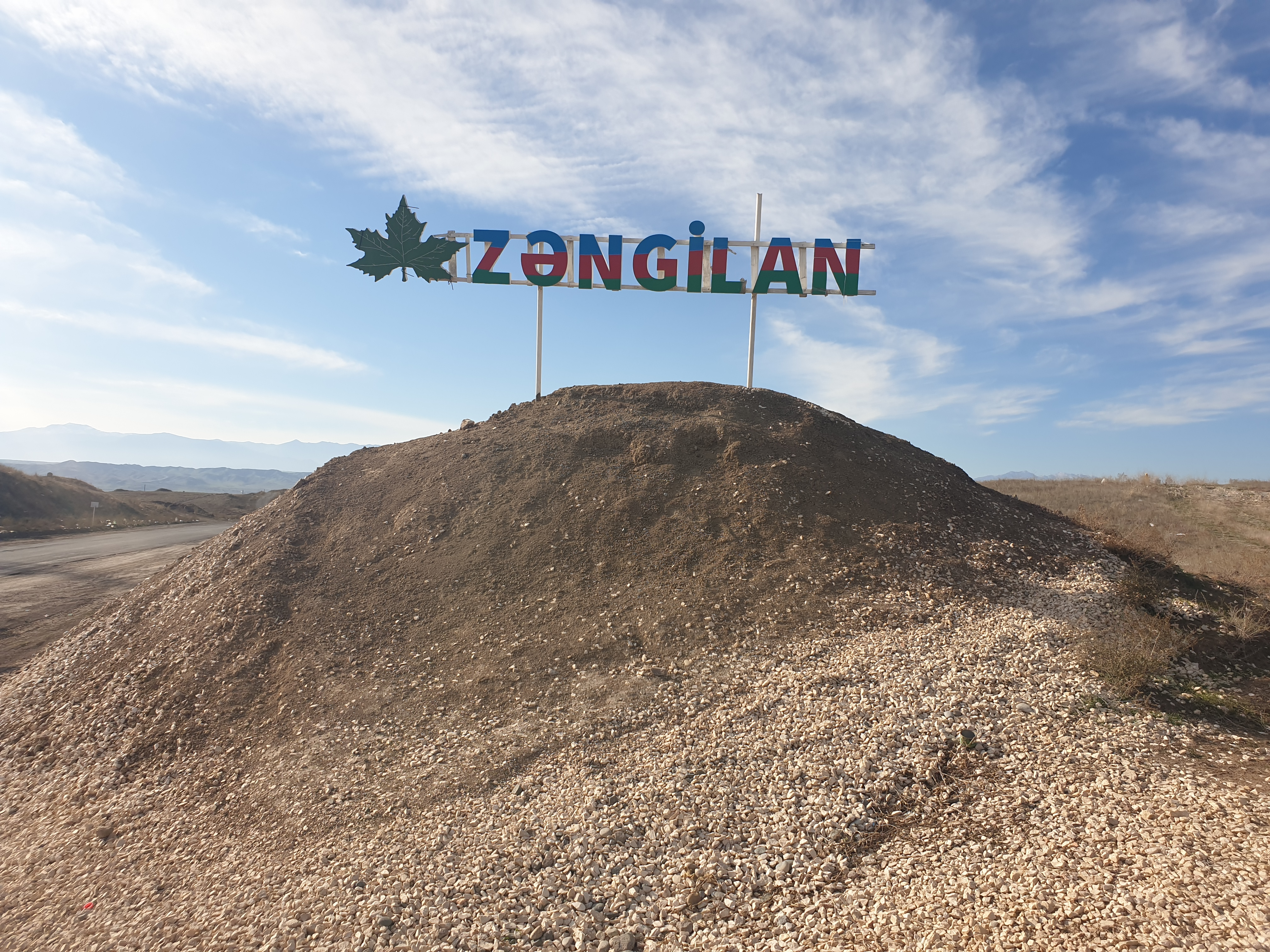
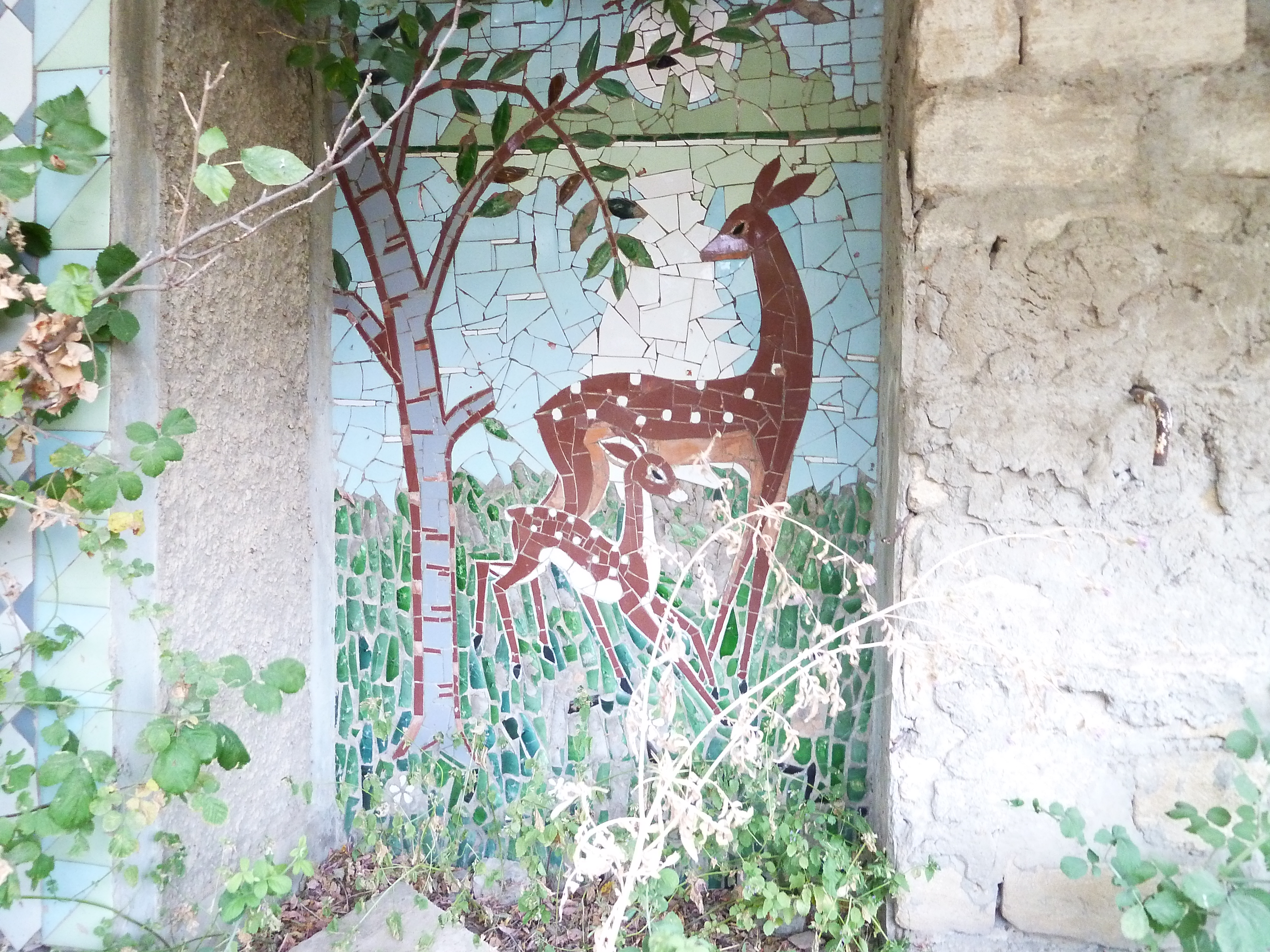
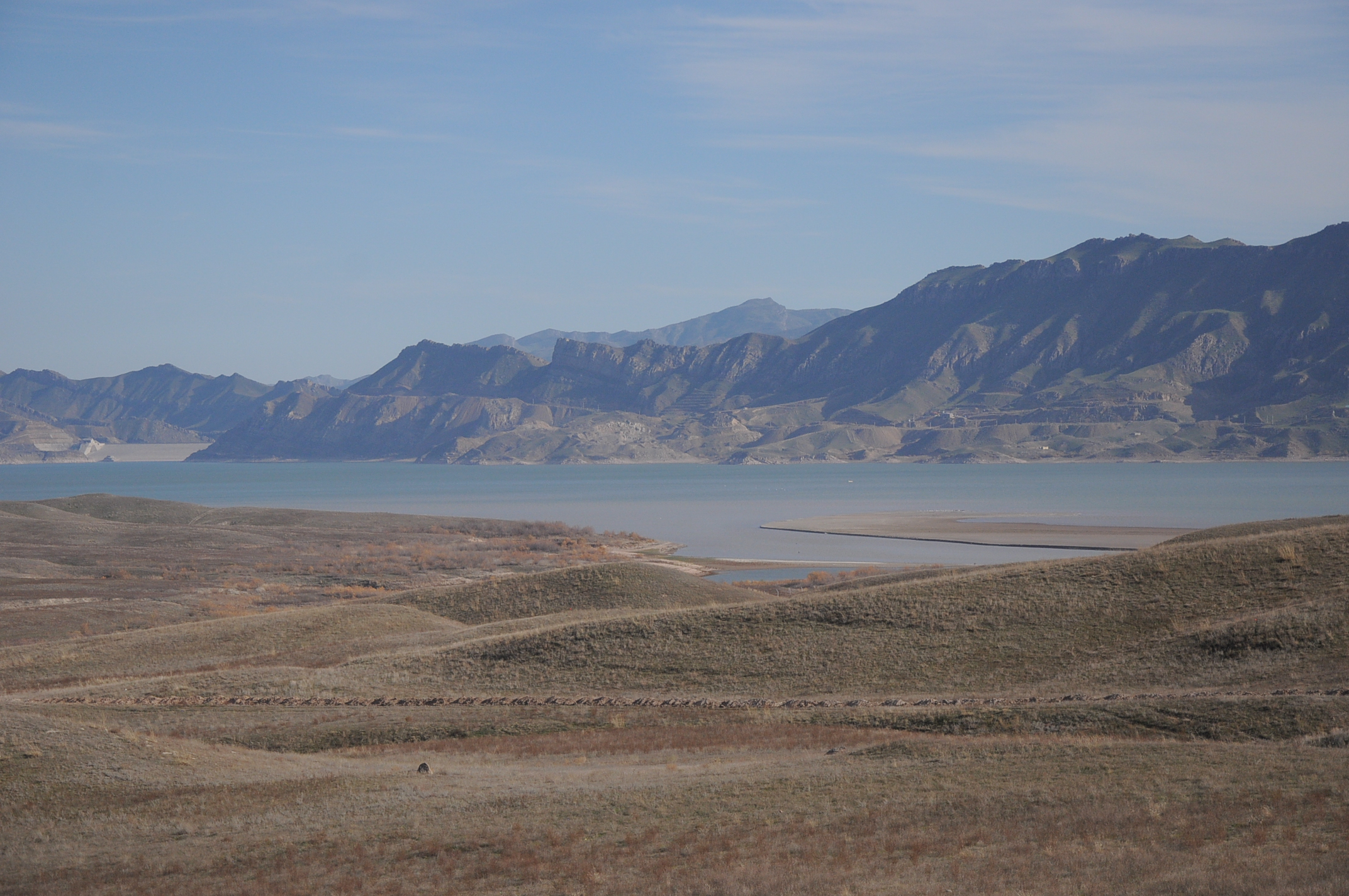
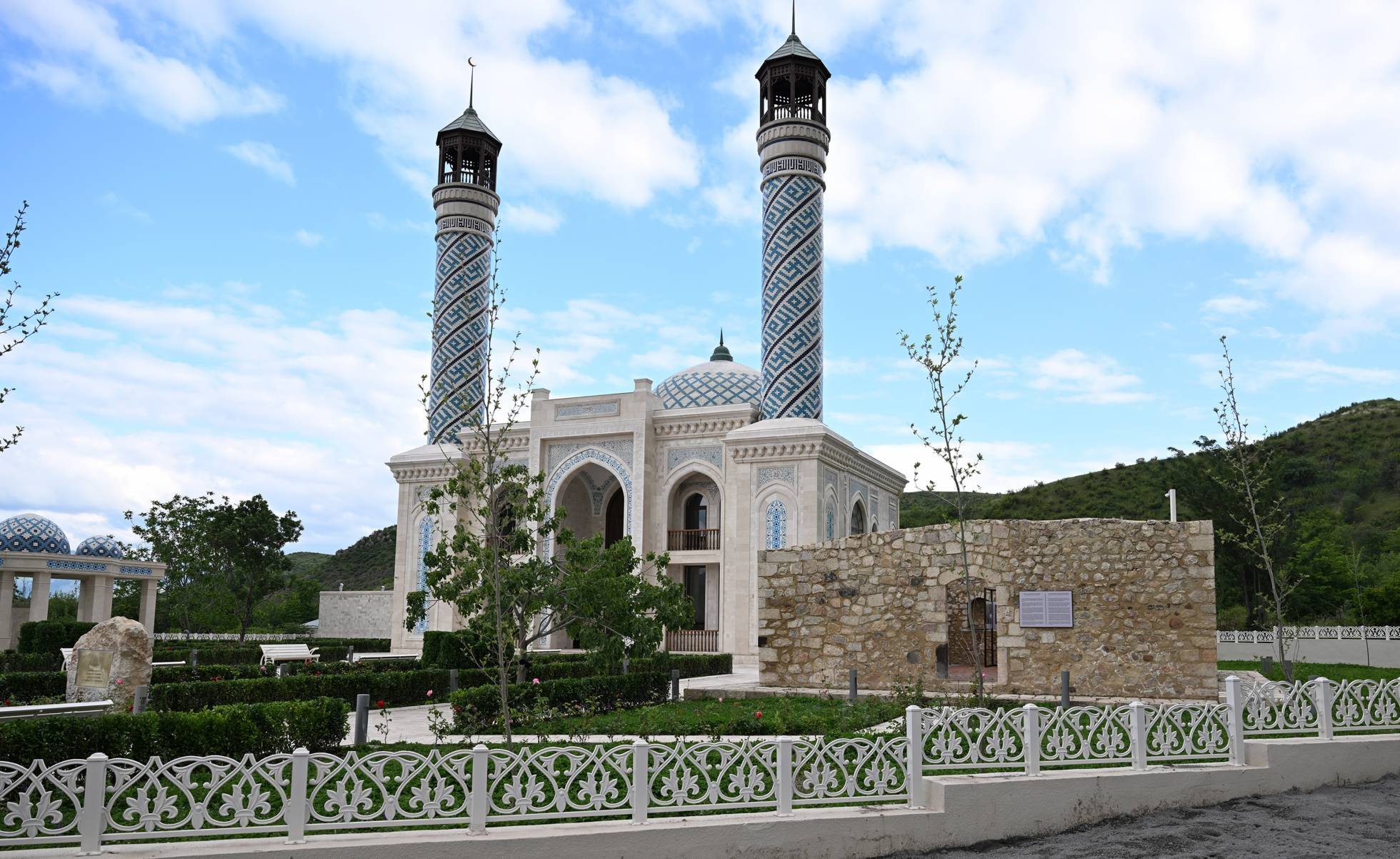
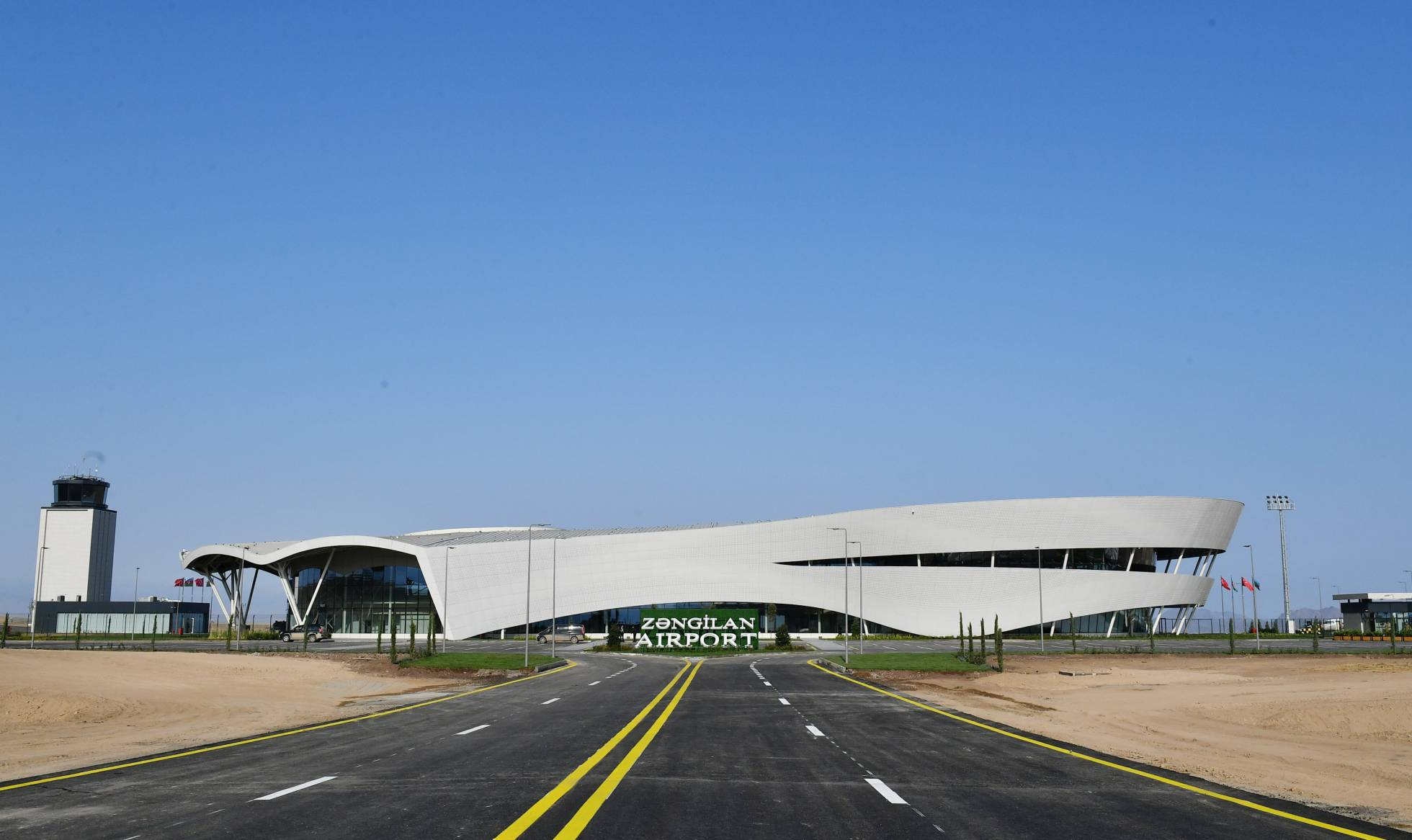
- From top left: Zangilan sign; Soviet-era Mural; Voghji river valley; Zangilan mosque; Zangilan International Airport

- Location within Azerbaijan Location within East Zangezur Economic Region
- Coordinates: 39°05′14.0″N 46°39′04.3″E
- Country: Azerbaijan
- District: Zangilan

Population (2015)
  - Total: 500
- Time zone: UTC+4 (UTC)

Zangilan (Note: Also anglicized as Zangelan) (Azerbaijani: Zəngilan, pronounced [zænɟiˈlɑn]) is a city in Azerbaijan and the administrative centre of the Zangilan District. It is situated along the Voghji (Okhchuchay) river.

== Etymology ==
According to the Armenian historian Hovhannes Gharagyozian, the town's historical name of Pirchivan, which it held until 1957 when it was renamed to Zangilan, originates from the settlement of Ashtarak mentioned by Stepanos Orbelian in his list of villages in the Kovsakan county of Syunik. The word ‘Ashtarak’ is seen as a synonym for ‘burj’ (tower/fortress) in the Armenian language. The name of the settlement next to the fortress comes from the joining of the words “Burj” + the Armenian suffix “-avan” (settlement). Thus creating “Burgi avan>Burjevan>Brjevan,” which was transformed into Pirchivan under Turkic phonetic influence.

== History ==
Soviet-Armenian historian Suren Yeremian states that the area of present-day Zangilan was part of the Kovsakan gavar (county) of the Syunik province within the Kingdom of Armenia. According to Armenian historian Konstantin Khudaverdyan, the area that would become Pirchivan was originally an Armenian settlement named Verjnavan (Armenian: Վերջնավան). In the 14th century, Verjnavan was mentioned as being a part of the Kovsakan gavar of the province of Syunik, during the period of Mongol Armenia.

After the Russian conquest of the Caucasus in the nineteenth century, Zangilan (then called Pirchivan) became part of the Zangezur Uyezd of the Russian Empire's Elisabethpol Governorate. According to 1886 census data, there were 50 homes and 211 Azerbaijanis (classified as "Tatars" in the census) of the Shiite branch of Islam in Pirchivan. According to the 1912 Caucasian Calendar, the village of Zangilan was home to 762 people, the majority of whom were Azerbaijanis (classified as "Tatars" in the census).

Pirchivan I and Pirchivan II were part of the village council of the same name in the Zangilan District of the Azerbaijan SSR during the early Soviet period in 1933. Pirchivan I was the administrative centre of the district, with 574 residents and 95 farms, while Pirchivan II had 148 residents and 35 farms. The village council's population, which also included the villages of Genlik, Malatkeşin, and Tağlı, was 98.7 percent Azerbaijani.

Pirchivan was classified as an urban-type settlement and renamed Zangilan by the Presidium of the Supreme Soviet of the Azerbaijan Soviet Socialist Republic on 31 August 1957. It was given city status in 1967. The city had a railway station on the Baku-Nakhchivan branch line, three schools, a music school, two public libraries, a cultural centre, a movie theatre, and a hospital. In March 1962, the Zangilan district was visited by Anastas Mikoyan and Soviet Armenian officials who met with their Azeri counterparts in celebration of the Soviet "friendship of peoples." The population was 6,968 people, according to the Soviet Census of 1989.

During the First Nagorno-Karabakh War, Armenian forces occupied the city on 29 October 1993, forcing the Azerbaijani population to flee. It was later incorporated into the breakaway Republic of Artsakh as part of its Kashatagh Province, where it was known as Kovsakan (Armenian: Կովսական). Following the outbreak of the Syrian Civil War, Armenian refugees from Syria, mostly farmers, settled in the city. Azerbaijan protested and described the settlement of Syrian Armenians on its internationally recognised territory as a violation of international law that impeded the peace process.

Azerbaijan recaptured the city on 20 October 2020, during the 2020 Nagorno-Karabakh War. On 23 December 2020, President Ilham Aliyev raised the Azerbaijani flag in the city.

== Historical heritage sites ==
Among the historical heritage sites in and around the city is the "Imam Huseyn" mosque, built between the 17th and 18th centuries.

== Demographics ==
| Year | Population | Ethnic composition | Source |
|---|---|---|---|
| 1886 | 211 | 100% Tatars (i.e. Azerbaijanis) | Transcaucasian Statistical Committee |
| 1911 | 762 | Mainly Tatars | Caucasian Calendar |
| 1939 | 1,103 | 83% Azerbaijanis, 10.1% Russians, 4.9% Armenians | Soviet Census |
| 1959 | 2,980 | 98.3% Azerbaijanis, 0.8% Russians, 0.2% Armenians | Soviet Census |
| 1970 | 4,103 | 98.6% Azerbaijanis, 0.7% Russians, 0.3% Armenians | Soviet Census |
| 1979 | 5,012 | 96.1% Azerbaijanis, 3.6% Russians, 0.1% Armenians | Soviet Census |
| 1989 | 6,968 | | Soviet Census |
| 1991 | ~7,200 | | Great Encyclopedic Dictionary |
29 October 1993: Occupation of Zangilan. Expulsion of Azerbaijani population
| 2015 | 500 | ~100% Armenians | NKR estimate |

== Transport ==
- Road

Horadiz–Jabrayil–Zangilan–Aghband Highway

- Airport

Zangilan International Airport

== Gallery ==
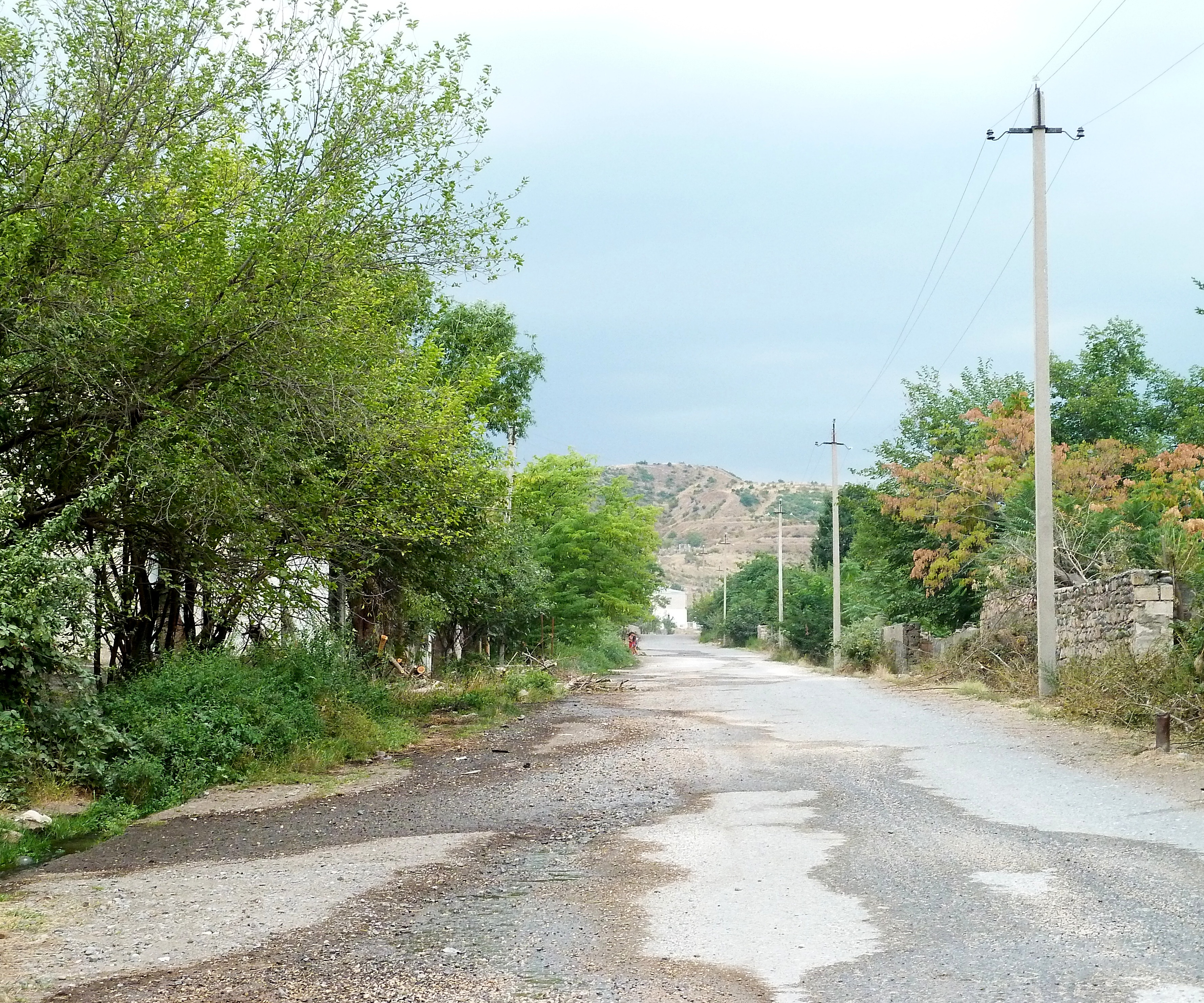

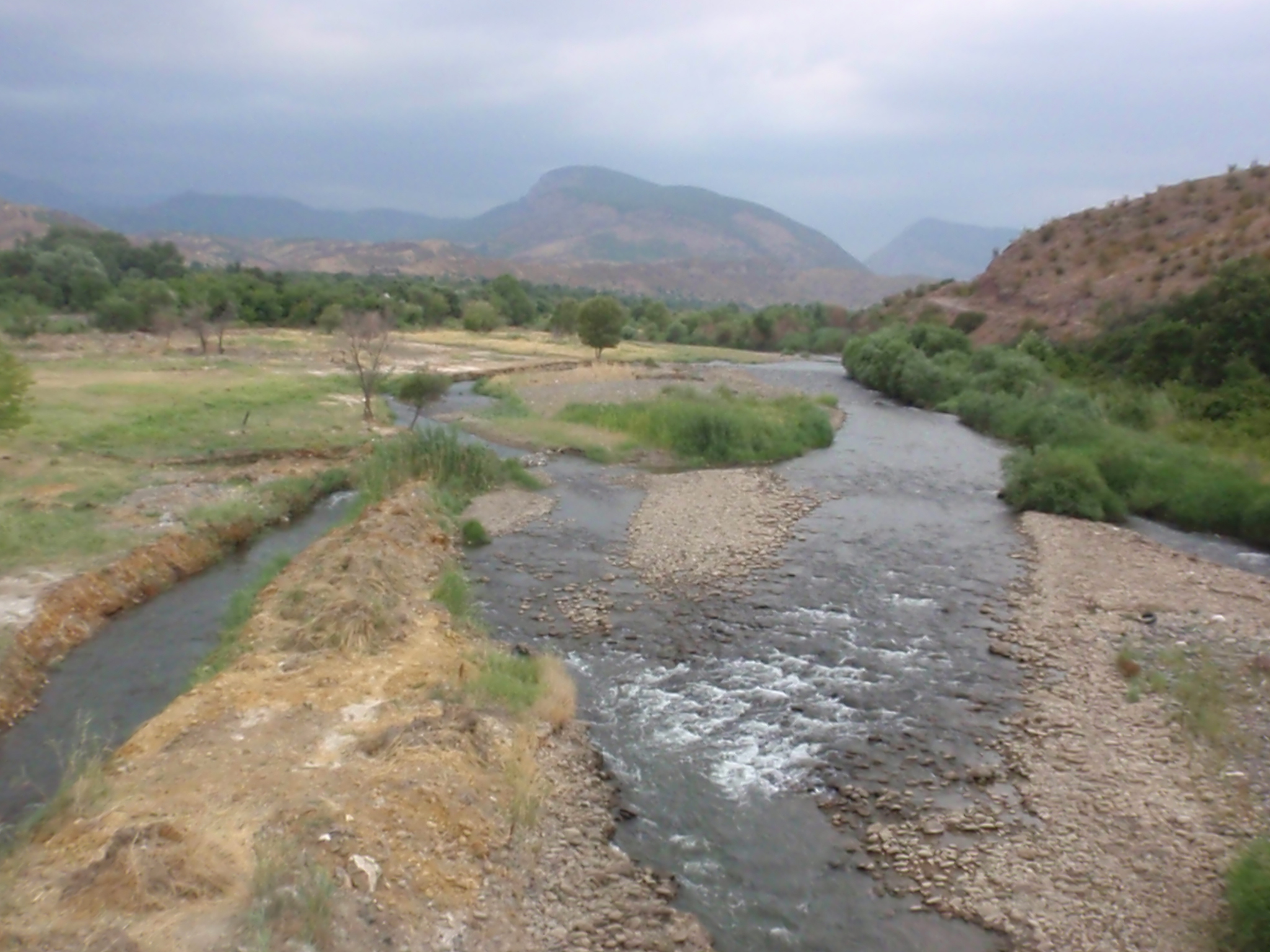
Okhchu River

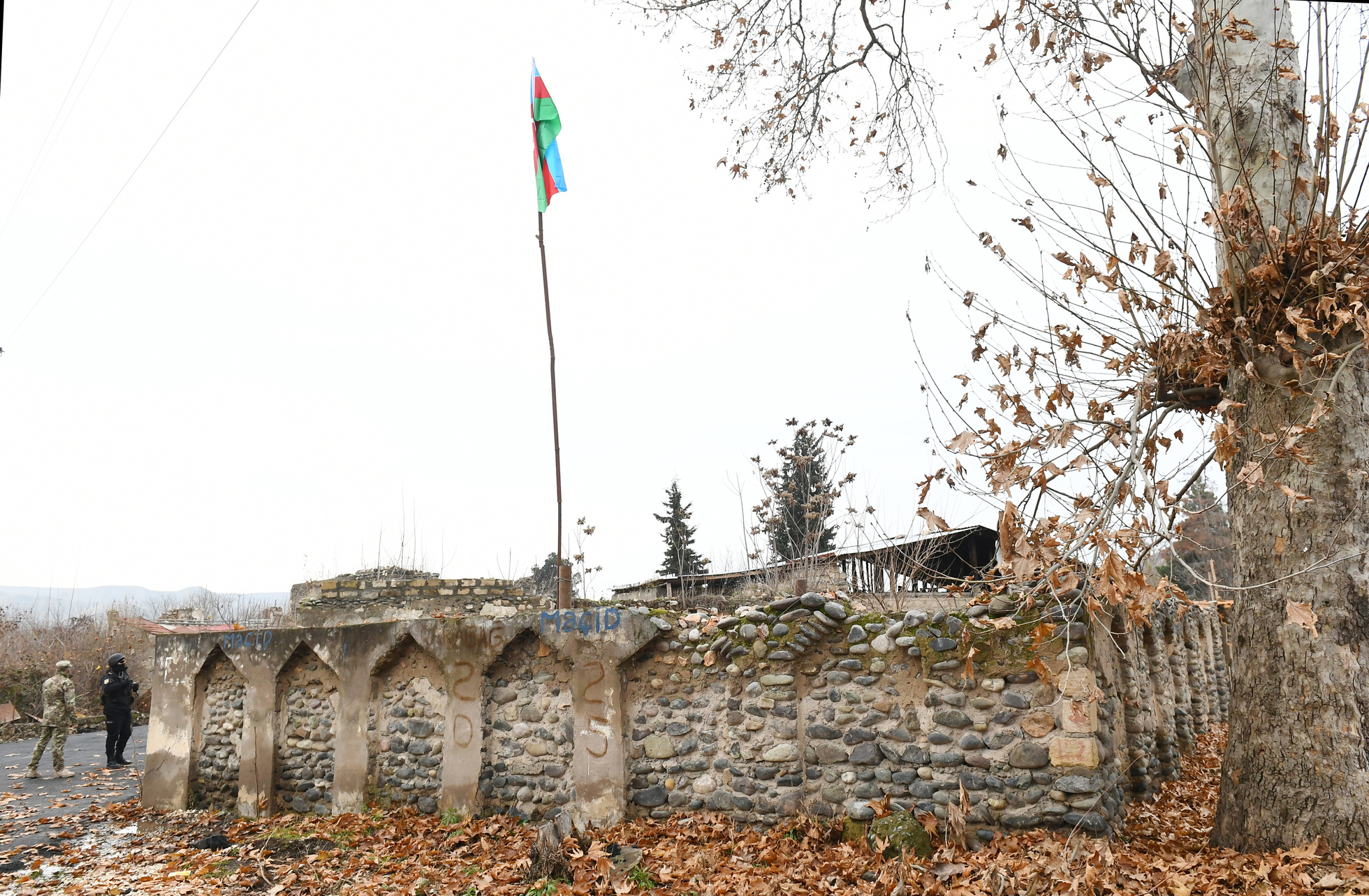
Ruins of the "Imam Huseyn" mosque

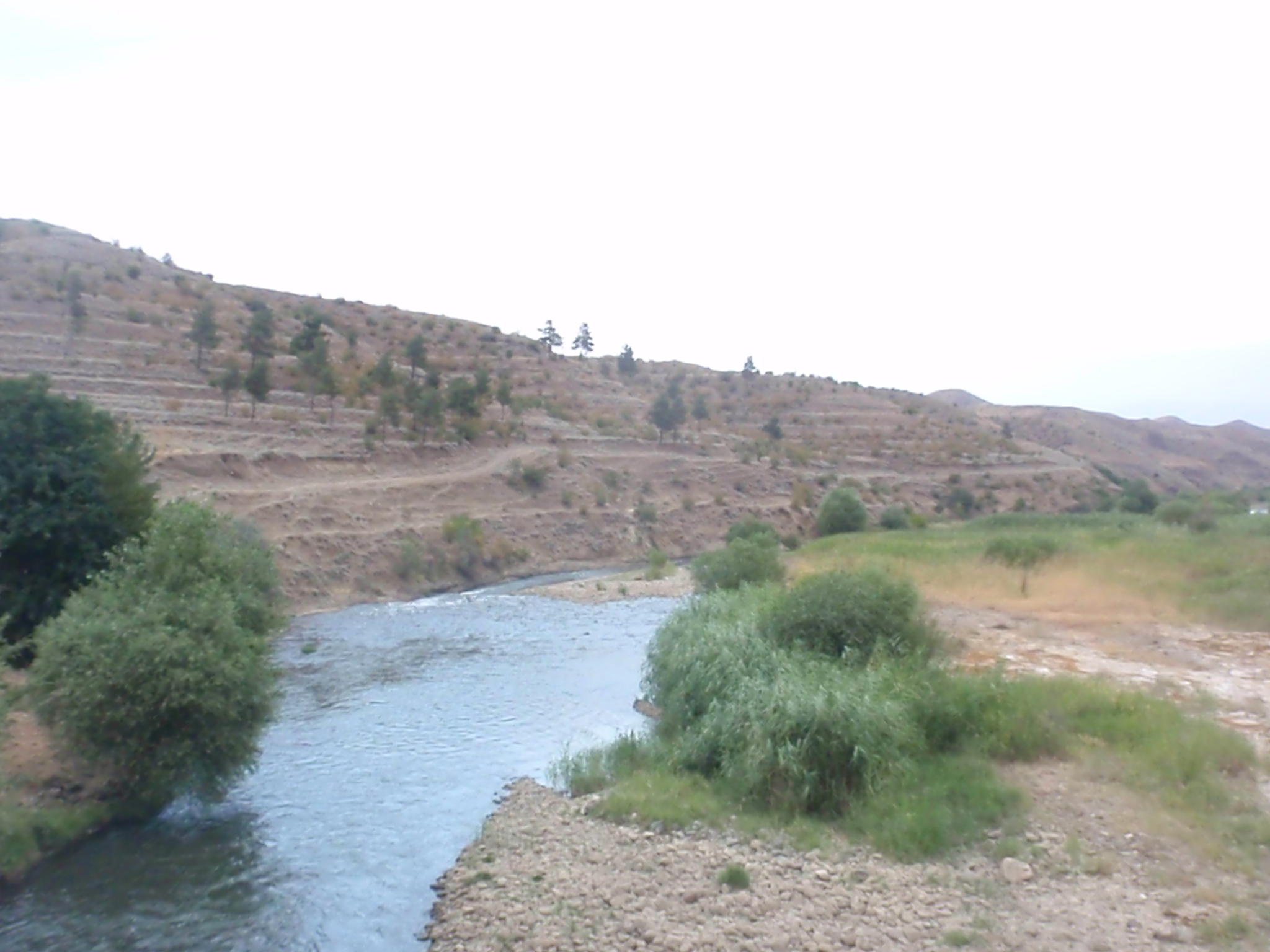
Okhchu River

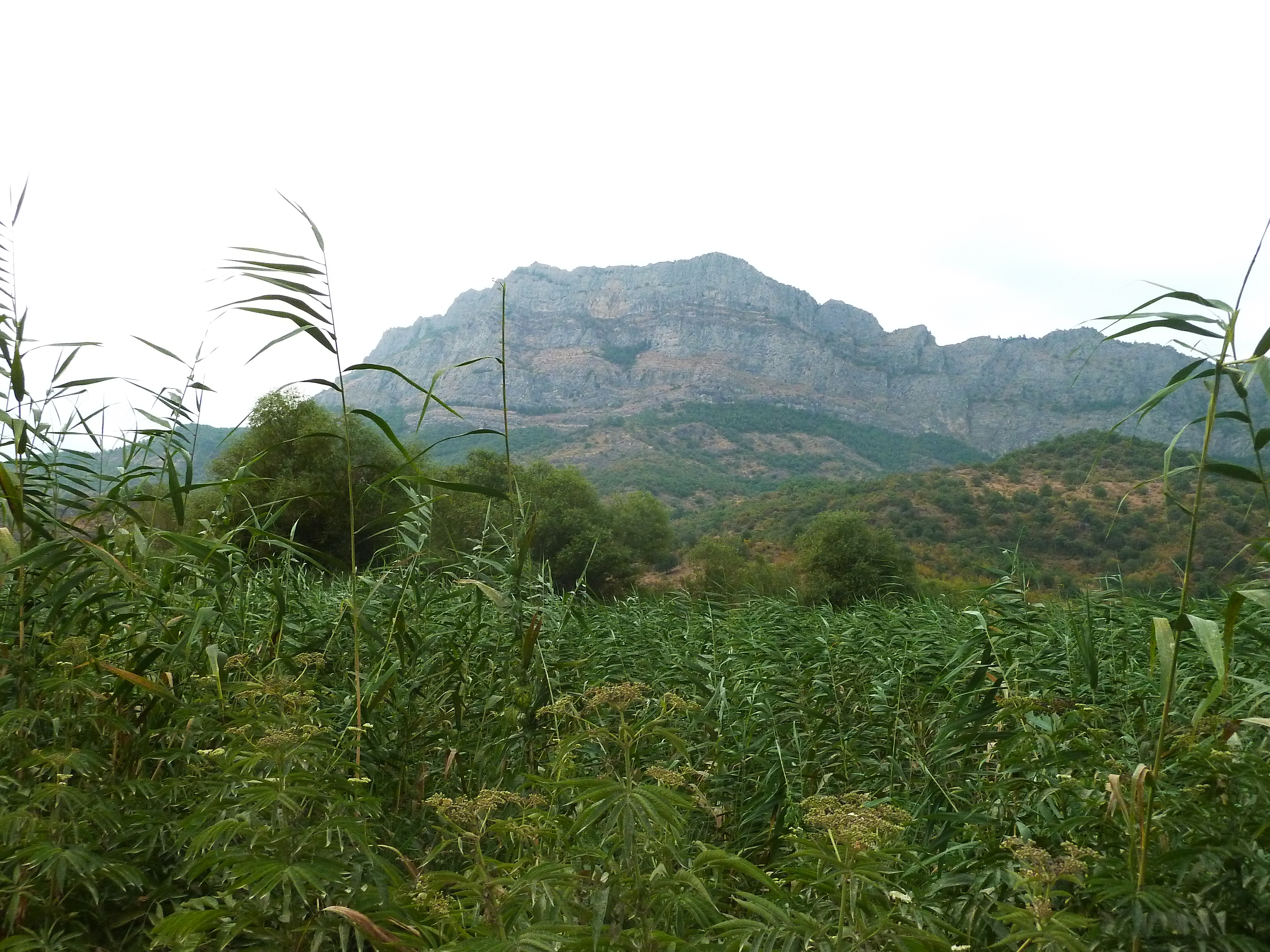
Zangilan's nature

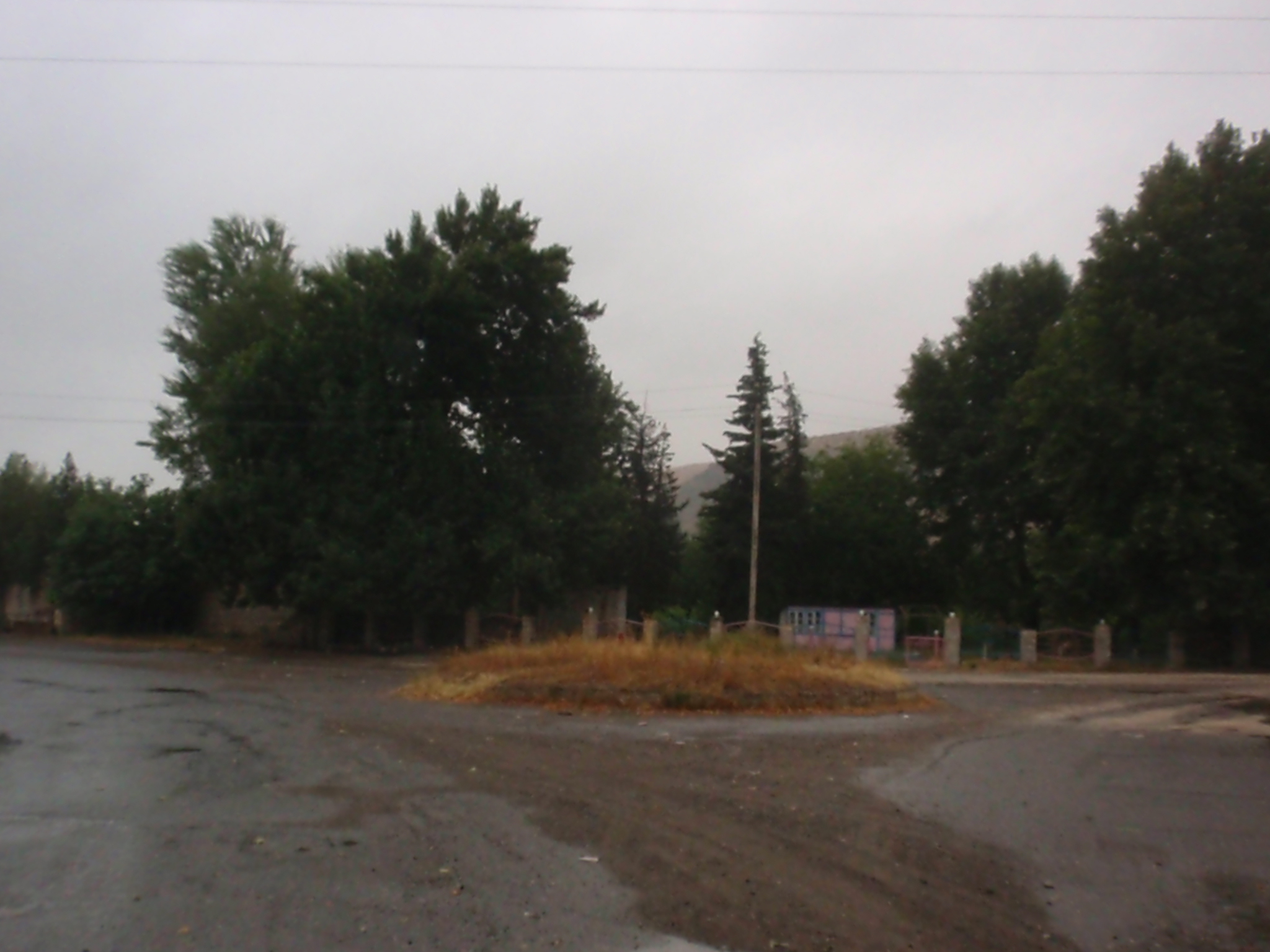
Roundabout in central Zangilan

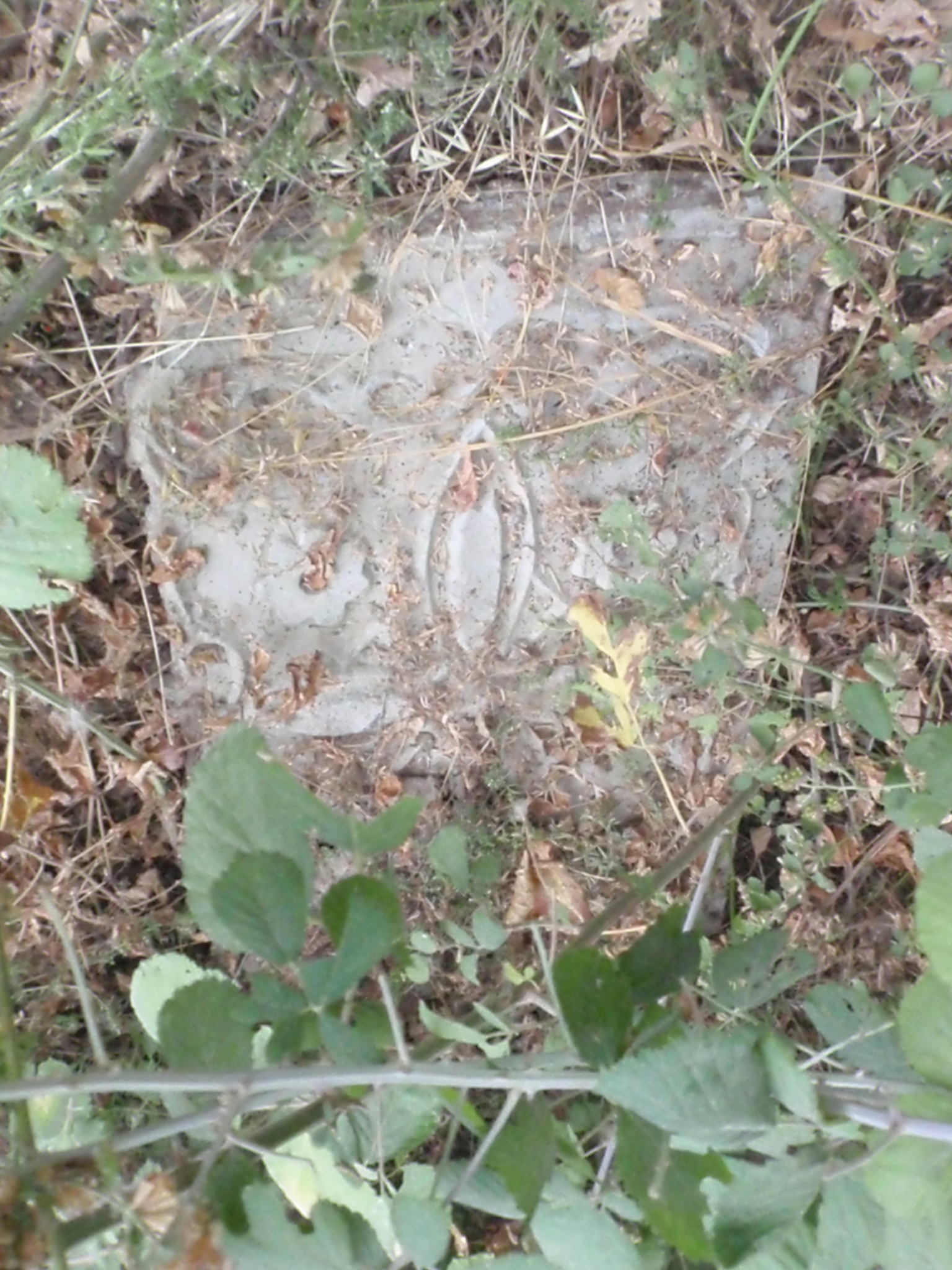
Old khachkar

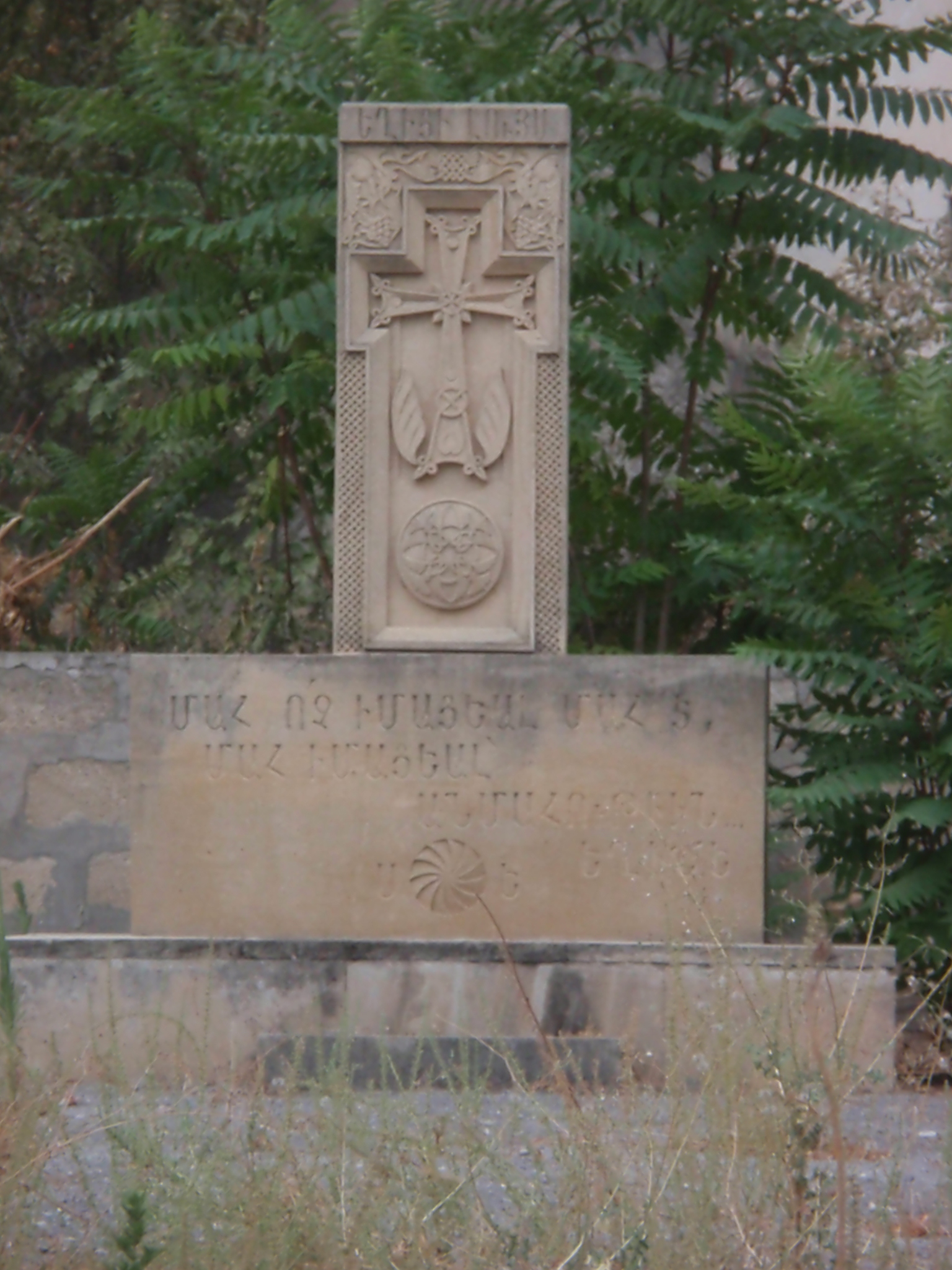
New khachkar
