= Tağlı =

- Location within Azerbaijan
- Coordinates: 39°07′22″N 46°35′58″E
- Country: Azerbaijan
- District: Zangilan
- Time zone: UTC+4 (AZT)

Tağlı is a village in Zangilan District of Azerbaijan.
