= Genlik =

- Location within Azerbaijan
- Coordinates: 39°06′19″N 46°38′20″E
- Country: Azerbaijan
- District: Zangilan
- Time zone: UTC+4 (AZT)

Genlik (Azerbaijani: Genlik)is a village located in the administrative-territorial district of the city of Zangilan in the Zangilan district of Azerbaijan. The village is situated on the bank of Okhchuchay River.

== History ==
According to the “Code of statistical data of the Transcaucasian region population, extracted from the family lists of 1886”, in the village of Genlik, Pirchivan rural district, Zangezur district, Elizavetpol province, were 83 dym. There lived 318 Azerbaijanis (in the source listed as "Tatars") who were Shiites by religion. The entire population was landlord peasants.

During the First Karabakh War, in 1993, the village was occupied by Armenian armed forces, and was destroyed.

On 22 October 2020, during the Second Karabakh War, the President of Azerbaijan announced the liberation of the village of Genlik by the armed forces of Azerbaijan.
