= AzeriCard =

- Industry: Financial services
- Founded: 1996; 30 years ago in Baku, Azerbaijan
- Headquarters: Azerbaijan
- Services: card processing
- Parent: International Bank of Azerbaijan

AzeriCard is an Azerbaijani bank card processing company. The International Bank of Azerbaijan owns 100 percent of AzeriCard.

== Products ==
=== Mobile Wallet ===
- AzeriCard offers customers what is known as a “mobile wallet." Customers can use their smartphone to pull out cash from ATMs without using an actual bank card during the transaction. The technology is named “Way4 Cash By Code."
- AzeriCard worked with technology company OpenWay to produce the mobile wallet service.
- By 2011, 15 banks in Azerbaijan were using mobile banking technology provided by AzeriCard.

=== Market share ===
- As of 2016 November-end, 35% of plastic cards, 65% of ATMs and 62% of point-of-sale terminals in Azerbaijan are served by AzeriCard.
- Currently, more than twenty banks locally and internationally use the services of AzeriCard.

=== Competitors ===
As of the beginning of 2017, there are two other companies in addition to AzeriCard that provide card processing services: MilliKart and KapitalBank.

== History ==
An example of the front of a typical debit card: 1. Issuing bank logo; 2. EMV chip; 3. Hologram; 4. Card number; 5. Card brand logo; 6. Expiration date; 7. Cardholder's name

An example of the reverse side of a typical debit card: 1. Magnetic stripe; 2. Signature strip; 3. Card Security Code

=== First bank card ===
- In 1997 AzeriCard was credited with creating the very first bank card in the country of Azerbaijan; the card was issued by the International Bank of Azerbaijan.
- AzeriCard’s systems work with MasterCard, Visa, American Express, Diners Club, UnionPay and JCB International.

=== Ownership ===
- AzeriCard is one of several subsidiaries of the International Bank of Azerbaijan. Other subsidiaries are:.
  - IBA-Moscow
  - International Bank of Azerbaijan-Georgia
  - International Insurance Company
- In addition to the International Bank of Azerbaijan, AzeriCard works directly with IBA-Moscow and IBA-Georgia.

=== Customers ===
Banks that use AzeriCard’s services are:

- AGBank
- Amrahbank
- AtaBank
- Bank Respublika
- International Bank of Azerbaijan
- PASHA Bank
- Yelo Bank
- Ziraat Bank Azerbaijan
- Silk Way Bank
- TuranBank
- Xalq Bank
- AFB Bank
- Azer-Turk Bank
- Bank Avrasiya
- Bank BTB
- NBC Bank
- Caspian Development Bank
- MuganBank
- Rabitabank
- VTB Bank Azerbaijan
- KDB Bank Uzbekistan

== See also ==
- Banking in Azerbaijan
- Credit card
- International Bank of Azerbaijan
- List of companies of Azerbaijan
