= Bir ecosystem =

Government payment and digital services infrastructure in Azerbaijan

- Type: Subsidiary
- Industry: Financial technology, Digital banking, Payment services, E-commerce
- Founded: February 7, 2025; 17 months ago
- Headquarters: Baku, Azerbaijan
- Area served: Azerbaijan
- Key people: Farid Huseynov (CEO)
- Products: Bir ID; Bir Pay; Bir Bonus
- Brands: Birbank; m10; Milliön; Birmarket; Future Lab
- Parent: PASHA Financial Holding
- Website: bir.az

The Bir ecosystem (stylized as Bir ecosystem; from the Azerbaijani word bir, meaning "one") is an Azerbaijani integrated ecosystem that provides digital services, including banking, payments, e-commerce and mobility payments to consumers and businesses.

It was officially launched in Baku on 7 February 2025 by uniting Azerbaijan’s consumer brands, including Birbank, m10 e-wallet, Milliön payment terminals, Birmarket e-commerce platform and Future Lab innovation hub. Bir also provides additional services through partnerships with BakıKart and Trendyol Azerbaijan.

The Bir ecosystem was officially unveiled on 7 February 2025 in Baku, when then-Executive Director (now CEO of PASHA Financial Holding) Farid Mammadov presented the ecosystem’s structure and strategy.

In August 2025, a delegation from Bir presented its data and artificial intelligence strategy at one of the largest AI industry events in North America, the Ai4 conference in Las Vegas.

In April 2026, Bir participated in a panel discussion at Money20/20 Asia in Bangkok alongside representatives of the Uzbek platform Uzum, speaking about ecosystem-driven innovation and financial inclusion.

In May 2026, Bir signed a memorandum of understanding with the Administration of the Icherisheher State Historical-Architectural Reserve to digitize visitor services in Baku's Old City through the integration of digital tools across the historic district for residents and tourists, including smart navigation, multilingual digital guides, QR code-based information systems, AI chatbot support and a mobile platform for accessing services.

== Structure ==
The Bir ecosystem combines several brands in three verticals: banking, payments and e-commerce:

- Birbank – a retail bank (consumer-facing brand of Kapital Bank) serving customers via branches and a mobile app with more than three million users as of 2025. Birbank’s mobile banking application is ranked No.1 by Google Play in Azerbaijan.
- m10 – an e-wallet and online payments service.
- Milliön – a physical network of payment terminals.
- Birmarket – an online marketplace (formerly Umico.az).

The ecosystem also integrates two non-owned partner services:

- BakıKart – the public-transport payment card for Baku’s Metro and city buses, enabling QR-code payments through Birbank and m10.
- Trendyol Azerbaijan – a joint venture (JV) with the local arm of the Turkish e-commerce platform Trendyol; the partnership enables installment payments with Birbank cards.

== See also ==
- Banking in Azerbaijan
- Economy of Azerbaijan
- Kaspi.kz
