= List of banks in Azerbaijan =

As of 2026, there are 22 banks operating in the territory of Azerbaijan. These include the nation's central bank (the Central Bank of Azerbaijan) and 21 private commercial banks.

== Central bank ==
- Central Bank of Azerbaijan

== Commercial banks ==
English name	Call name	Licence date	Majority Owner	Capital	Website
“Accessbank” CJSC	Accessbank	25 October 2002	ADB	(Azerbaijan)	accessbank.az
“AFB Bank” CJSC	AFB Bank	28 November 2008		(Azerbaijan)	afb.az
“International Bank of Azerbaijan” OJSC	ABB	30 December 1992	Azerbaijan Investment Holding	(Azerbaijan)	abb-bank.az
“Azerbaijan Industry Bank” OJSC	ASB	28 September 1996	Anadolu Investment	(Azerbaijan)	asb.az
“Azer-Turk Bank” OJSC	ATB	29 June 1995	State Service on Property Issues	(Azerbaijan)	atb.az
“Bank Eurasia” OJSC	BankAvrasiya	28 November 2007		(Azerbaijan)	bankavrasiya.az
“Bank of Baku” OJSC	Bank of Baku	18 February 2005	NAB Holding	(Azerbaijan)	bankofbaku.az
Bank "BTB” OJSC	Bank BTB	19 March 2010		(Azerbaijan)	btb.az
“Bank Respublika” OJSC	Bank Respublika	15 December 1992	Guliyev family	(Azerbaijan)	bankrespublika.az
"Premium Bank” OJSC	Premium Bank	6 January 1994	Hamzayeva Zaria Kamil	(Azerbaijan)	premiumbank.az
“Bank VTB (Azerbaijan)” OJSC	VTB	22 October 1993	VTB Group	(Russia)	vtb.az
“Expressbank” OJSC	Expressbank	30 December 1992	Azenco	(Azerbaijan)	expressbank.az
"Xalq Bank" OJSC	Xalq Bank	27 December 2004	İdeal Business Ko	(Azerbaijan)	xalqbank.az
“Kapital Bank” OJSC	Kapital Bank	8 February 2000	PASHA Holding	(Azerbaijan)	kapitalbank.az
“Yelo” OJSC	Yelo Bank	25 February 1994	Topaz Investment	(Azerbaijan)	yelo.az
“Pasha Bank” OJSC	Pasha Bank	28 November 2007	PASHA Holding	(Azerbaijan)	pashabank.az
“Rabitabank” OJSC	Rabitəbank	30 June 1993	Zakir Nuriyev	(Azerbaijan)	rabitabank.com
"TuranBank" OJSC	TuranBank	30 December 1992		(Azerbaijan)	turanbank.az
“Unibank” OJSC	Unibank	10 December 1992	Eldar Garibov	(Azerbaijan)	unibank.az
“Yapi Kredi Bank Azerbaijan” CJSC	YapıKredi Bank	11 January 2000	Yapı ve Kredi A.Ş.	(Turkey)	yapikredi.com.az
“Ziraat Bank Azerbaijan” OJSC	Ziraat Bank	30 December 2014	T.C. Ziraat Bankası A.Ş.	(Turkey)	ziraatbank.az
Foreign bank branch
"Bank Melli Iran" (Baku Branch)	BMI Baku	29 January 1993	Bank Melli Iran	(Iran)	bmibaku.az

== Defunct banks ==
- AtaBank
- Azal Bank
- Bank Silk Way
- Debutbank
- DemirBank
- Dresdner Bank
- Evrobank
- AGBank (1992-2020)
- Amrahbank (1993-2020)
- AtaBank (1993-2020)
- NBCBank (1992-2020)
- Vahid bank
- Zaminbank (1992-2016)
- KredoBank (1994-2016)
- United Credit Bank (1996-2016)
- Bank of Azerbaijan (1993-2016)
- Ganjabank (1994-2016)
- Parabank (1991-2016)
- Bank Technique (1994-2016)
- Royal Bank (1993-2012)
- DekaBank (1989-2016)
- Atrabank (1992-2016)
- Caspian Development Bank
- Bank Standard (1995-2016)
- DəmirBank (1989-2017)
- Caucasus Development Bank (-2016)
- Günay Bank (1992-2023)
- Muğanbank (1992-2023)

== Recent developments ==
As of early 2026, total assets of Azerbaijan's banking sector reached approximately 55–57 billion AZN, reflecting moderate growth supported by expanding credit activity.

The sector remains relatively concentrated, with several systemically important banks—including Kapital Bank, International Bank of Azerbaijan, PASHA Bank, and Unibank—playing a dominant role in the financial system.

== See also ==
- Banking in Azerbaijan
- List of banks in Europe
