= Yapi =

Yapi is a surname. Notable people with the surname include:

- Cyril Yapi (born 1980), French footballer
- Darren Yapi (born 2004), American soccer player
- Gilles Yapi Yapo (born 1982), Ivorian footballer

See also

- Enerji Yapi-Yol Sen v Turkey, is a European labour law case
- Yapi Kredi Bank Azerbaijan, is a bank based in Azerbaijan
- Yapi Kredi Publications, is one of the biggest publishing houses in Turkey
