= DekaBank (Azerbaijan) =

- Company type: Open Joint-Stock Company
- Industry: Banking
- Founded: 1989
- Headquarters: Baku, Azerbaijan
- Area served: Azerbaijan
- Key people: Surayya Agayeva, Chairman of the Supervisory Board; Ismayil Aliyev, Chairman of the Management Board
- Products: Financial services
- Website: www.dekabank.az

DekaBank was formed as the first private bank in Azerbaijan in 1989. Until the collapse of the USSR, it served as a cooperative bank, whereas the Central Bank of Azerbaijan issued a license in 1992 which authorized the bank to offer all kinds of commercial banking services.

The devaluation in 2015, along with the decline in oil prices on global markets, led to the collapse of Azerbaijan's banking sector. By decision of the Board of Directors of the Financial Markets Supervisory Authority of the Republic of Azerbaijan dated 21 July 2016, DekaBank's banking licence was revoked. A decision was taken to liquidate the bank and appoint the Azerbaijan Deposit Insurance Fund as its liquidator.

== See also ==
- Banking in Azerbaijan
- Central Bank of Azerbaijan
- List of banks in Azerbaijan
- Azerbaijani manat
- Economy of Azerbaijan
