= AccessBank Azerbaijan =

Commercial bank of Azerbaijan

AccessBank
- Type: Closed Joint-Stock Company
- Industry: Banking
- Founded: 29 October 2002
- Headquarters: Baku, Azerbaijan
- Area served: Azerbaijan
- Key people: Davit Tsiklauri, Chairman of the Board
- Products: Financial services

AccessBank is a bank headquartered in Baku, Azerbaijan. It has a network of over 32 branches across Azerbaijan.

== History ==
AccessBank, formerly known as the Micro Finance Bank of Azerbaijan (AMMB), is a financial institution established on October 29, 2002. It was founded with support from various international financial institutions including Black Sea Trade & Development Bank, the European Bank for Reconstruction and Development, International Finance Corporation, KfW and LFS Financial Systems, each holding a 20 percent stake in the bank.

On September 8, 2008, AMMB underwent a name change, officially rebranding as AccessBank. Currently, the bank has 32 branches in Baku city, Absheron, and other regions.

In 2003, the bank received its first refinancing loan from the EBRD in the amount of USD 5 mln. The current accounts and the money transfer system were launched in 2004.

In 2005, the term deposit launched, and the bank joined the international SWIFT, Western Union and Privat Money money transfer networks. It received the first non-shareholder refinancing loans from Global Microfinance Facility, Blue Orchard, Deutsche Bank, Incofin, and Triodos. Also in 2005, it opened the first regional branch in Ganja.

In 2007, AccessHolding became a new shareholder, acquiring a 16.53 percent stake in the bank. This change in ownership resulted in a decrease in LFS Financial Systems' shares to 3.47 percent.

The bank became a lead sponsor of the Association of Football Federations of Azerbaijan (AFFA) in 2010 and in 2013.

By the third quarter of 2023, AccessBank's assets totaled 1.4 billion manats, with a deposit portfolio of 1025.6 million and a credit portfolio of 992.4 million. Its total capital stood at 133.9 million manats. Interest income amounted to 142 million manats, with net interest income rising to 88.7 million manats. Non-interest income reached 13.4 million manats, contributing to a net operating profit of 40.9 million manats and 29.3 million manats.

== Awards ==
- In 2009, AccessBank was recognized as one of the top three most sustainable banks in Eastern Europe at the Financial Times Sustainable Banking Awards.
- In 2009, it earned the title of "Azerbaijan's Most Transparent Bank" from Standard & Poor’s rating agency.
- The bank received the "Five Diamonds" award from the Microfinance Information Exchange (MIX) in 2010.
- From 2010 to 2014 and again in 2016, it was named "Azerbaijan's Best Bank" by Euromoney Publishing Group.
- AccessBank was recognized as "Azerbaijan's Best Bank" by Global Finance in 2011, 2013, and 2015.
- Won two nominations in the AMCHAM CSR 2014 Excellence Award competition.
- In 2019 and 2020, AccessBank was honored with the prestigious "STP Quality Award" from Raiffeisen Bank International AG.
- The Banker bestowed the title of "Bank of the Year" upon AccessBank in 2011, 2012, 2015, 2016, and 2020.

== See also ==
- Azerbaijani manat
- Banking in Azerbaijan
- Central Bank of Azerbaijan
- Economy of Azerbaijan
- List of banks in Azerbaijan
