= AtaBank =

- Company type: Open Joint-Stock Company
- Industry: Banking
- Founded: 1993
- Defunct: 2020
- Headquarters: Baku, Azerbaijan
- Area served: Azerbaijan
- Key people: Ashraf Kamilov, Chairman of the Supervisory Board; Iltifat Agayev, Chairman of the Executive Board
- Products: Financial services
- Website: www.atabank.com

AtaBank was one of the largest commercial banks in Azerbaijan established in 1993. It was a subsidiary of ATA Holding. The bank opened its first branch out of the capital city in Khachmaz in 2003. It had 19 branches and 2 divisions across the country. The financial reports of AtaBank were audited by the Deloitte.

In 2014, the bank opened branches in new locations in Naftalan and Gyanja. The Gyanja location is housed inside a local hospital.

In 2013, the bank's net profit was 5.6 million AZN. Return on capital for 2013 was calculated at 19.4 percent.

In 2020, the bank was declared bankrupt. "Atabank" OJSC was unable to fulfill its obligations regarding the return of public deposits for a long time. As a result of the inspections carried out by the Central Bank of Azerbaijan, it was found that AtaBank has incurred serious financial losses, completely lost its capital and has become bankrupt. According to the latest checks, the capital index of AtaBank is 214 million AZN, however, 264 million AZN is needed for the bank's normal operation.

Through discussions with the bank's shareholders, they were informed about the results of the inspections and they were offered additional capitalization of the banks, but they did not use this opportunity. AtaBank and another bankrupt bank, Amrahbank have a 2.1% share in the assets of the banking sector, and 3% in the loan portfolio. With the relevant decisions of the Board of Directors of the Central Bank dated April 27, 2020, temporary administrators were appointed to oversee the operations of AtaBank. All powers of the bank's management, including the powers of the general meeting of bank shareholders, were transferred to the temporary administrator. According to the decision of the Board of Directors of the Central Bank dated April 28, the license of "Atabank" OJSC was canceled from the same date. As a result, the bank was appealed to the court to liquidate it through bankruptcy.

== See also ==
- Azerbaijani manat
- Banking in Azerbaijan
- Central Bank of Azerbaijan
- Economy of Azerbaijan
- List of banks in Azerbaijan
