= Bank Respublika =

Azerbaijani commercial bank

- Bank Respublika branch in Barda
- Type: Open Joint-Stock Company
- Industry: Financial services
- Founded: May 22, 1992; 34 years ago
- Headquarters: Baku, Azerbaijan
- Number of locations: 35 branches, 1 service point (Dec 2024)
- Area served: Azerbaijan
- Key people: Elchin Guliyev, Chairman of the Supervisory Board
- Products: Banking services
- Total assets: US$1.1 billion (2024)
- Number of employees: 1,805 (Dec 2024)
- Rating: B2 (Moody's, July 2024), ▲ B1 (outlook: positive)
- Website: www.bankrespublika.az

Bank Respublika is an Azerbaijani private commercial bank established on May 22, 1992, based on the license issued by the Central Bank of Azerbaijan.

As of 2023, the bank held deposits worth over $700 million (₼1.2 billion) and was the fifth largest bank in Azerbaijan. It was granted systemically important bank status on March 1, 2024. It had a market share of 4.1% in 2024.

== History ==
Bank Respublika was established in May 1992 as a private bank with significant focus on small and medium-sized enterprise (SME) operating in the non-oil and gas sectors in Azerbaijan. It experienced a sharp crunch of the ability to lend during the 2008 financial crisis years, requesting major recapitalization from the shareholders.

On June 1, 2011, the bank's total capital exceeded 53.7 million Azerbaijani manat (₼) (US$31.6 million) and total assets reached ₼294.2 million (US$173.0 million), with the later accounting for 1.9% of the total assets held by banks in Azerbaijan, making it the 10th largest in the country at the time.

== Shareholders ==
The bank is majority owned by the members of the Guliyev family, who solidarily own 75% of the bank. In 2018, the primary shareholder Natig Guliyev increased its stake to 53.72 percent. The other equity investors in the bank are two Germany's financial institutions: German Investment Corporation (DEG), a member of KfW banking group, and Sparkassen International Development Trust (SIDT), a member of financial group Sparkassen-Finanzgruppe. The relevant agreements to purchase a "25%+1 share" were signed between the parties on April 28, 2005, in Bank Respublika's head office.

Structure of Bank Respublika's shareholders (in 2011):

- Guliyev family – 75%:
  - Natig Guliyev – 16.7%
  - Elchin Guliyev – 15.2%
  - Sevda Guliyeva – 14.5%
  - Saday Guliyev – 14.4%
  - Mariya Guliyeva – 14.1%
- DEG – 16.7%
- Sparkassen International Development Trust – 8.3%
- Others – 0.2%

== See also ==
- Bank Respublika Arena
- Banking in Azerbaijan
- Economy of Azerbaijan
