= Azerigasbank =

Private bank established in Azerbaijan

- Type: Open Joint-Stock Company
- Industry: Banking
- Founded: 1992
- Headquarters: Baku, Azerbaijan
- Area served: Azerbaijan
- Key people: Chingiz Asadullayev, Chairman of the Supervisory Board
- Products: Financial services
- Website: www.agbank.az

Azerigasbank (1992–2020), also spelled Azerigazbank and commonly known as AGBank, was a private commercial bank headquartered in Baku, Azerbaijan. It was a member of the Baku Stock Exchange from 15 September 1993, and its accounts were audited by PricewaterhouseCoopers from 2000 onwards. On 12 May 2020, the Central Bank of Azerbaijan revoked AGBank's banking licence after finding that its capital had been fully depleted, and the bank has since been undergoing liquidation.

== History ==
AGBank was founded in 1992 in Baku. In 1996, the Asian Development Bank extended a term loan facility to AGBank as part of a broader programme aimed at strengthening Azerbaijan's emerging private banking sector, which at the time remained dominated by state-owned banks, and at expanding lending to micro, small and medium-sized enterprises outside the oil economy.

By November 2008, the bank's total assets exceeded 221 million manats, having grown by 41 percent since the start of the year, and its loan portfolio had reached 162.5 million manats; that year Fitch Ratings assigned AGBank a long-term foreign-currency issuer default rating of 'B-' with a stable outlook, alongside a short-term rating of 'B'. The bank was also a participant in the European Bank for Reconstruction and Development's trade finance programme in Azerbaijan.

In April 2013, the Central Bank of Azerbaijan revoked the licence of an AGBank office known as "Diller Universiteti", located on Rashid Behbudov Street in Baku; after the revocation, the bank continued to operate through 22 remaining branches and offices.

== Financial difficulties and liquidation ==
Following Azerbaijan's transition to a floating exchange rate in December 2015, which sharply devalued the manat, Fitch Ratings placed the long-term issuer default ratings of AGBank and Demirbank on Rating Watch Negative, citing a significant weakening of both banks' capital positions. In February 2016, following the announcement of a planned merger between the two banks, Fitch revised AGBank's Rating Watch to Evolving and downgraded its Viability Rating to 'f', noting that the bank's regulatory total capital ratio had fallen to 0.9 percent by the end of 2015 – down from 9.7 percent in November 2015 – and that it carried substantial unreserved non-performing loans. Both banks stated that the merger would proceed only if the combined entity received sufficient capital support from shareholders or the Central Bank.

On 27 April 2020, the Central Bank of Azerbaijan appointed temporary administrators at AGBank and three other lenders, transferring all management powers, including those of the general shareholders' meeting, to the appointed administrators.

On 12 May 2020, the Central Bank revoked AGBank's banking licence after an assessment by the temporary administration found that the bank's financial position was unsatisfactory, that its capital had been fully depleted, and that 51 percent of its loan portfolio was non-performing as of 30 April 2020; after adjustments for reserves, the bank's negative capital was estimated at 167 million manats against a required minimum of 50 million manats. The Central Bank subsequently petitioned the courts to have the bank declared bankrupt and liquidated.

The Azerbaijan Deposit Insurance Fund has since managed the sale of AGBank's remaining assets as part of the liquidation process. In May 2024, the Fund put a residential property owned by the bank in Ganja up for public auction.

== Management ==
Following an extraordinary shareholders' meeting held on 4 March 2016, AGBank's authorised capital was increased from 77.2 million to 102.2 million manats. At the same time, Afghan Jalilov, previously deputy chairman of the management board, was appointed acting chairman, while outgoing chairman Azer Movsumov moved to the supervisory board. The supervisory board – chaired by Chingiz Asadullayev – then also included Farzulla Yusifov, Grigory Marchenko, Azer Movsumov and a representative of the International Finance Corporation. The management board was led by deputy chairman Tokay Alizade alongside members Sakina Khalafova and Elnur Musayev.

== Shareholders ==
- International Finance Corporation - 17,500 percent
- Kazimir Partners Company - 10,000 percent
- Chingiz Asadullayev (chairman of the supervisory board) - 27.532 percent
- Farzulla Yusifov (member of the supervisory board) - 23.111 percent

The minority shareholders count to 74 and hold 21.856 percent of the bank's equity. The bank's dividend policy is to pay out 15 percent dividends per annum.

== Awards ==
- In 2005, AGBank received "Caspian Energy Award" in nomination "Corporate bank of 2005".
- In 2006, AGBank received the national business award “UGUR” in nomination "Bank of the Year".
- In 2008, AGBank received national business award “UGUR” in nomination "Rebranding of the Year".
- In 2010, AGBank received “Azerbaijani Business Award” in nomination "Innovative Product of the Year".

== See also ==
- Banking in Azerbaijan
- Central Bank of Azerbaijan
- List of banks in Azerbaijan
- Azerbaijani manat
- Economy of Azerbaijan
