= Royal Bank (Azerbaijan) =

Azerbaijani private commercial bank

- Industry: Banking
- Founded: August 2, 1993
- Defunct: August 2, 2015
- Fate: Bankruptcy
- Headquarters: Baku, Azerbaijan
- Area served: Azerbaijan
- Key people: Azer Shahmardanov, Chairman of the Supervisory Board
- Products: Financial services Commercial banking
- Website: www.royalbank.az

Royal Bank, also referred to as Royal Bank of Baku, was an Azerbaijani private commercial bank established as split off of ÖZ Bank on 2 August 1993. It was liquidated in 2012 due to falling into insolvency.

== History ==
ÖZ Bank was founded in 1991 as the first venture capitalist bank in Azerbaijan following their independence from the Soviet Union. They adopted the Royal Bank name in 1993 after splitting ÖZ Bank's commercial arm off as a separate commercial bank. Royal bank provided financial services for individual customers, small- and mid-size businesses. The last supervisory board took control of the bank in 2004 and initiated a program on restructuring the financial and control systems. Royal Bank was turned into an open stock company and was listed on the Baku Stock Exchange in 2006. It had 32 regional branches, including the branches in Baku. In 2011, they opened an independent subsidiary bank called Royal Investment Bank in Dubai, United Arab Emirates.

On 2 August 2012, the Central Bank of Azerbaijan cancelled the license of Royal Bank due to the unfulfilled liabilities and refusing to reply to the written notifications of the Central Bank. It was believed to be an insurance case. On 2 August 2015, the Administrative Economic Court in Baku announced that Royal Bank had gone bankrupt. 130 creditors received compensation for their lost savings from the Azerbaijan Deposit Insurance Foundation. The government of Iran wrote to Azerbaijan and the Central Bank asking for the assets that they held with Royal Bank to be returned as a result. As a part of the liquidation process, the real estate assets of the bank were auctioned off in 2022.
