= Budget of Azerbaijan =

The budget system of the Republic of Azerbaijan consists of the state budget, the budget of the Nakhchivan Autonomous Republic, and local budgets.

== Analysis of the legislative base of the state budget in the Republic of Azerbaijan ==
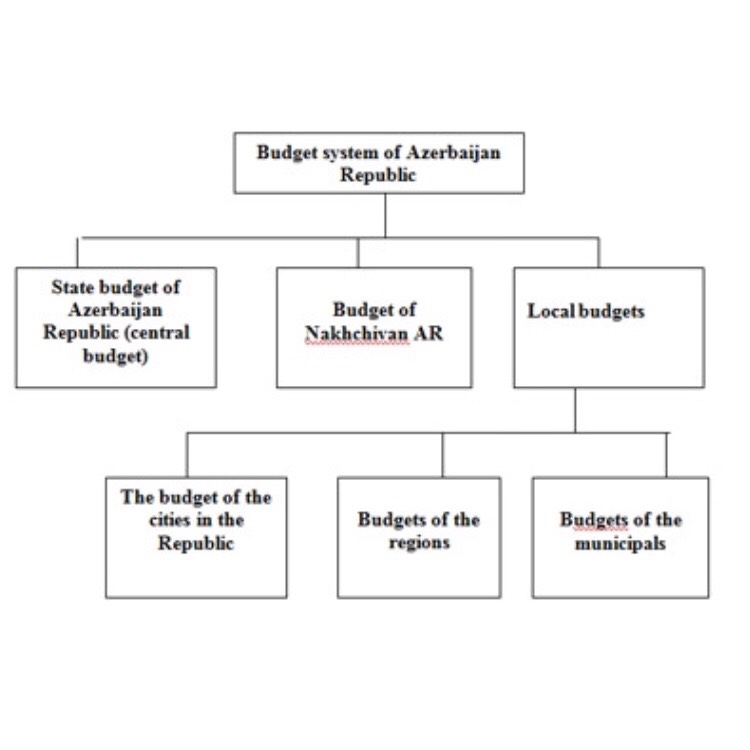
The budget system of Azerbaijan

Budget processes are regulated by the budget law in any state. The budget legislation of the Republic of Azerbaijan means the Constitution of the Republic of Azerbaijan, the Law of the Republic of Azerbaijan "On Budget System", laws on state budget adopted in accordance with the Law "On budget system" and other normative-legal acts, as well as international treaties wherein the Azerbaijan Republic is one of the parties. The legal status of the budget participants in the Republic of Azerbaijan is regulated by:

- The Law on the Budget System of the Republic of Azerbaijan (June 2, 2002)
- Special laws of the Republic of Azerbaijan and normative acts of local self-governing bodies.
- The order of the President of the Republic of Azerbaijan.
- Normative legal acts of the Government of the Republic of Azerbaijan.
- Relevant acts of the State Executive Authority.

The first law on the budget system was adopted on December 1, 1992, and kept its legal force until 2002. In order to eliminate the existing gaps, a special law on the State Budget of the Republic of Azerbaijan was adopted on May 18, 1999. The adopted new law was meant to help the law "on the Budget System". Even though this law was adopted, the law on the budget system remained in force but lost its important documental function as a regulator of the processes.

The President of the Republic signed the second law "On the budget system" on July 2, 2002. The current "Budget System" law came into force on January 1, 2003 (with addition and amendments dated May 13, 2003; December 3, 2004; April 5, 2005; October 21, 2005; December 23, 2005; March 3, 2006; November 28, 2006; November 30, 2007; October 28, 2008; April 14, 2009; June 19, 2009; May 29, 2012; June 20, 2014; October 14, 2016; December 16, 2016; December 30, 2016), and as a result of the coming into force of the law, the above two normative acts lost their legal force.

== Process of compilation of the state draft budget and the budget calendar ==
Compilation of the state draft budget is the preparation of draft state budget for the next year; based on estimation of forecasts of the country's economic and social development, targeted programs, and evaluation of the results of the financial and economic activity of the areas of economy, administrative regions, all enterprises regardless of their ownership forms for the current and next year.

The preparation process of the draft state budget starts 11 months before the next budget year and covers the period until the date of submission to the National Assembly of Azerbaijan. It starts with the decision of the relevant executive authority at the press in the third decade of January. According to this decision, the medium-term economic and social development forecasts of the country prepared by relevant executive authority are made exact until the end of February. While determining expenses of the budgetary organizations, their extra-budgetary expenditures are taken into account. Economic and social development forecasts and state investment program for the next and following three years are being specified by the relevant executive authorities by August 1, taking into account the actual results of the six months of the current year.

The preliminary version of summary budget for the next year and indicators of the final budget for next three years should be submitted to relevant executive authority and Chamber of Accounts of the Republic of Azerbaijan until September 15 of the current year.

The preliminary version of final state budget and indicators of the final budget for the next three-year, together with other documents determined by this Law should be submitted to the relevant executive authority until September 25.

== Submission of documents to the National Assembly (parliament) ==
After receiving appropriate budget projects from financial bodies, the executive authorities review the budget draft and, if necessary, make amendments and additions. The Government of Azerbaijan submits the draft law on the state budget for the next fiscal year together with other documents (which added to the Law) to the President of the Republic of Azerbaijan until October 1. The President of the Republic of Azerbaijan reviews them and submits to the National Assembly no later than October 15 according to the Article 109.2 of the Constitution of the Republic of Azerbaijan.

The Central Bank submits to the National Assembly the draft of the main directions of the state monetary policy for the next fiscal year until October 1 of the current year. This draft is also sent to the President of Azerbaijan and the Government of the Republic of Azerbaijan. Projects of targeted programs financed by the state budget at the National Assembly are reviewed and adopted simultaneously with the draft law on state budget. The President of Azerbaijan submits to the National Assembly the draft law on making amendments and additions to the law on the state budget.

== Local Budgets ==
Local budgets are the budget of municipalities (administrative districts, cities, settlements, villages). It is a serious financial document reflecting the real goals and objectives of the municipality. Formation, approval, and execution of local budgets are carried out by local self-governance bodies. Municipalities provided with subsidies from the state budget should submit the local draft budget to the relevant executive authority (Ministry of Finance of the Republic of Azerbaijan) until 1 May, together with the relevant documents and information.

== Use of budget ==
The following budget of expenditures and sources are financed by the state budget of the Republic of Azerbaijan:

- Ensuring the activities of the National Assembly of the President of the Republic of Azerbaijan, the Chamber of Accounts, the Central Election Commission and the Central Executive Authorities;
- The Judicial Power and Prosecutor's Office
- Implementation of international activities which are important for state
- Ensuring national defense, national security of the state, the functioning of the military complex
- Repayment of the state debt of the Republic of Azerbaijan
- Holding elections and referendums;
- Implementation of the state investment program;
- State support of industrial areas;
- Conducting Scientific Research;
- Environmental Protection;
- Elimination of consequences of emergency situations;
- Development of market infrastructure;
- Organization of mass media;
- Financial assistance to local budgets;
- Other expenditures within the competence of state and municipal bodies, etc.

== List of budgets ==
The following table shows the state budget of the Republic by the years.

Budget of Republic
Years	Revenue	Expenditure	Surplus/Deficit	Sources
2011	12 061 000,0	12 748 000,0	-687 000,0	
2012	16 438 000,0	17 072 000,0	-634 000,0	
2013	19 159 000,0	19 850 000,0	-691 000,0	
2014	18 384 000,0	20 063 000,0	-1 679 000,0	
2015	19 438 000,0	21 100 000,0	-1 662 000,0	
2016	16 822 000.0	18 495 000,0	-1 673 000,0	
2017	16 255 000,0	16 900 000,0	-645 000,0	
2018	20 127 000,0	21 047 000,0	-920 000,0	
2019	23 168 000.0	25 190 000.0	-2 022 000,0	

== Nakhchivan Autonomous Republic ==
The budget system of the Nakhchivan Autonomous Republic is determined by the Constitutions of the Azerbaijan Republic and the Nakhchivan Autonomous Republic, the law on the budget system, as well as other legislative acts.

The Cabinet of Ministers of the Nakhchivan Autonomous Republic draws up the budget of the autonomous republic and submits it for approval to the Supreme Assembly of Nakhchivan. The budget is also executed by the Cabinet of Ministers of the Nakhchivan Autonomous Republic.

The budget is formed at the expense of taxes and duties, which are determined by the Tax Code of Azerbaijan and other payments. Budget funds are used to implement social and economic programs, finance activities for the development of the region and improve the welfare of the population.

== See also ==
- Economy of Azerbaijan
- Finance in Azerbaijan
