= Financial Market Supervisory Authority of Azerbaijan =

Financial Market Supervisory Authority (Azerbaijani: Maliyyə Bazarlarına Nəzarət Palatası) better known by its abbreviation FIMSA, was the financial regulatory authority in Azerbaijan from February 2016 to November 2019.

== See also ==
- Finance in Azerbaijan
- Baku Stock Exchange
- List of financial supervisory authorities by country

Website of the Financial Market Supervisory Authority of Azerbaijan
