= Elman Rustamov =

Azerbaijani politician

Elman Rustamov Elman Rüstəmov
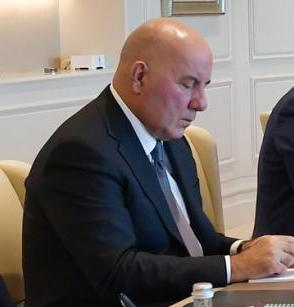

Chairman of Azerbaijan Central Bank
- In office 13 January 1995 – 12 April 2022
- President: Heydar Aliyev, Ilham Aliyev
- Preceded by: Qalib Ağayev
- Succeeded by: Taleh Kazimov

Personal details
- Born: 29 June 1952 (age 73) Jabrail district, Azerbaijan
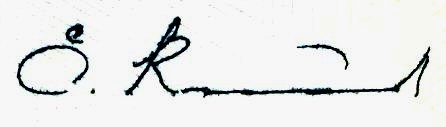
- Signature

Elman Rustamov (Azerbaijani: Elman Rüstəmov) is an Azerbaijani politician. He was the chairman of Azerbaijan Central Bank from January 1995 until April 2022.

== Biography ==
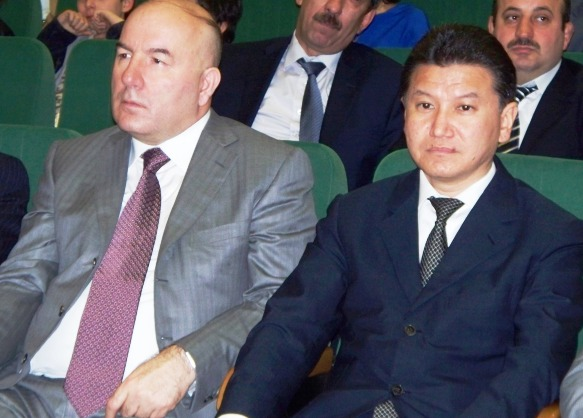
Elman Rustamov (left) with the President of the World Chess Federation FIDE, Kirsan Ilyumzhinov.

Rustamov was born 29 June 1952 in Jabrail district of Azerbaijan.

=== Education ===
In 1969, he entered Azerbaijan National Economy Institute (now Azerbaijan State Economic University), faculty of Planning of National Economy. In 1973, he graduated with honors from the University.

=== Academic activity ===
In 1973–1978, he completed his PhD at the Azerbaijan National Economy Institute named after D. Bunyadzade. In 1986, he successfully defended the scientific thesis at Scientific Research Institute of Economy in Moscow and obtained a diploma.

During 1990-1992 he continued scientific activity towards a Doctorate degree at the Economy Institute under the USSR State Planning Committee. In 1993, he received a degree in Doctor economic science.

=== Job activity ===
Rustamov started his professional life at the Scientific Research Institute of Economy under USSR State Planning Committee as an economist immediately. After six months he joined military service in Smolensk city and completed it in 1975. In 1978–80, he worked at Baku Fine Broadcloth Union of Azerbaijan SSR Ministry of Light Industry as a head of the department of Economy. After 2 years he returned to his first workplace (Scientific Research Institute of Economy under USSR State Planning Committee) and worked there until 1990.

In 1991–1992, he continued his professional activity at the Presidential Administration of Azerbaijan as a chief adviser.

Rustamov joined the Central Bank of Azerbaijan in December 1992. In 1993–1994, he worked at the Agrarian – Industrial Union Joint Stock Bank as Deputy Chairman of the Management Board. In 1994, he was appointed to the First Deputy Chairman of the Management Board of Azerbaijan Central Bank. In 1995, he was nominated to the governorship by the Order of the Azerbaijan President - Heydar Aliyev. In 2000, 2005 and 2010, he was reappointed the second, third and fourth time.

Since 1995 he has simultaneously been Administrator for Azerbaijan at World Bank Group, MIGA and European Bank for Reconstruction and Development.

== Macroeconomic policy activity ==
During the 2008 financial crisis monetary policy orientation of Central Bank of Azerbaijan strictly expanded: refinancing rate was cut down from 15% up to 2%, reserve requirement ratio from 12% up to 0.5%. In exchange rate policy Rustamov voted for financial stability holding a pegged regime against the US dollar.

== See also ==
- Azerbaijani manat
- Banking in Azerbaijan
- Economy of Azerbaijan
