= Unibank (Azerbaijan) =

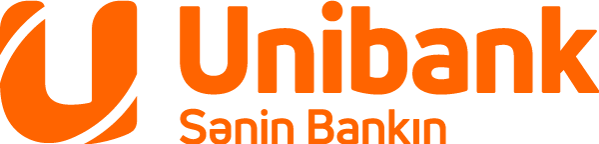
- Formerly: MBank, PROMTEKHBANK
- Company type: A Joint-Stock Commercial Bank
- Industry: Banking
- Founded: 22 August 1992
- Headquarters: 55, Rashid Behbudov Street, Baku, AZ 1014, Azerbaijan
- Area served: Azerbaijan
- Key people: Eldar Garibov – main shareholder, European Bank for Reconstruction and Development (EBRD) – shareholder
- Products: Financial services
- Number of employees: 1,238

Unibank is one of the largest private banks established in Azerbaijan in July 1992 under the name of MBank. In 2021, Unibank co-founded the first Azerbaijani neobank called Leobank.

The bank was established on 15 October 2002 as a result of the merger of two advanced private commercial banks of Azerbaijan, MBank with PROMTEXBANK, one of the leading banks of Azerbaijan. The merged bank was named Unibank.

In December 2025, Ilkin Guliyev was elected to the bank’s Board of Directors and appointed Chief Administrator for Retail Banking and Marketing.

== Marketing ==
Until 2009, Unibank was the main sponsor of the Azerbaijan Premier League, the highest level of the Azerbaijani football league system.

== See also ==
- Banking in Azerbaijan
- Central Bank of Azerbaijan
- Economy of Azerbaijan
