= Finance system in Azerbaijan =

The finance system in Azerbaijan comprises the government’s policies and institutional arrangements for borrowing, lending, and asset transfers. It includes banks, insurance companies, other financial institutions, the pension system, financial markets, and payment systems.

Financial policy of Azerbaijan is aimed at the implementation of the state program of economic development of the Republic. The development of the Azerbaijani financial system and the whole market infrastructure depends on the activities of commercial banks, insurance companies and other financial institutions.

== Financial policy ==
The purpose of financial policy is to ensure the stable development of the state economy by using the financial relations and financial potential of the country. The main objectives of Financial policy in Azerbaijan consist of:

- Financial legislation
- Organizational forms of financial relations
- Creation and use of state foundations
- Financial forecasting and planning methodology
- Financial management

== Banking system ==
Article 2.1 of the Law of the Republic of Azerbaijan on Banks (adopted amendments and additions on March 4, 2005, March 6, 2007, April 17, 2007, October 19, 2007, October 2, 2008, May 26, 2009 and June 30, 2009) states:

The banking system of Azerbaijan consists of the Central Bank of Azerbaijan and credit institutions. The country has a two-stage developed banking system based on market principles (the first stage is the National Bank of the Azerbaijan, the second — commercial and other non-Bank credit institutions).

According to the 2015 report, 45 banks functioned in Azerbaijan. Some of them were closed. At present (2018), 30 banks operate in Azerbaijan, two of which are state-owned (Azer-Turk Bank, International Bank of Azerbaijan) and 28 are private commercial banks.

=== The Central Bank of the Republic of Azerbaijan ===
Azerbaijan state Bank was created by the Azerbaijan Democratic Republic by decree of March 7, 1919. On may 31 of next year, the name of the Bank was changed Into "Azerbaijan people's Bank". In 1923, following the establishment of the State Bank of the USSR, its Baku branch was opened and the whole system was managed by the Central Department. On 18 October 1991, as a result of the restoration of state independence, the necessary legal framework was established for the creation of a unified banking system of the Republic of Azerbaijan and consequently, the National Bank.

The President signed a Decree "on the establishment of the National Bank of Azerbaijan", formed on the basis of the State Bank, Industrial-building and Agrarian-industrial Bank of the former Soviet Union" on February 11, 1992. The law "on the structure of the National Bank of Azerbaijan" was adopted on August 7 of the same year.

In 2004, the government adopted two laws on “the Law of the Republic of Azerbaijan on the Central Bank of the Republic of Azerbaijan” and on “the Law of the Republic of Azerbaijan on Banks”.

In 2009, the name of National Bank of Azerbaijan was changed into the Central Bank of Azerbaijan as a result of a Referendum held for making some amendments and additions to the Constitution of Azerbaijan.

The main purpose of the activity of Central Bank is to ensure price stability in the country within its competence. In addition, stability and development of the banking and payment systems are also part of the goals of central bank.

== Budget policy ==
The budget touches the interests of the country's population, being an integral part of the public administration system, directly serves them.

According to the Constitution of the Republic of Azerbaijan and the Law of the Republic of Azerbaijan "On the Budget System", classification of various budgets has been provided in country, which creates the budget system.

The budget policy of Azerbaijan is defined by the Constitution of Azerbaijan, the Budget code of Azerbaijan, and a set of laws establishing the functions of individual authorities in the budget process and legislation.

The budget policy solves the following tasks:

- determination of sources of formation of the state budget revenues;
- providing conditions for the formation of the maximum possible financial resources;
- establishment of rational distribution and use of financial resources;
- determination of the structure of the expenditure part of the budget;
- determination of the amounts of expenses distributed between budgets of different levels;
- organization, regulation and stimulation of economic and social processes by financial methods;
- determination of the share of the Federal budget from the total amount of the consolidated budget;
- determination of public debt management objectives;
- determination of budget

The budget system in the Republic of Azerbaijan consists of the state budget of the Republic of Azerbaijan, the budget of the Nakhichevan Autonomous Republic and local budgets.

== Monetary policy ==
Monetary policy is also being implemented by Central Bank, along with the financial policy implemented by various financial authorities for ensuring financial stability. The main purpose of monetary policy of Azerbaijan is to provide financial stability, sustainable employment and economic growth without inflation.

The main directions of the monetary policy are regulated by Article 28 of the Law of the Republic of Azerbaijan "On National Bank":

The National Bank annually reports the main directions of the monetary policy of the state for the coming year to the President of Azerbaijan no later than October 1 and declares to the community through mass media until December 31.

The methods of implementing the monetary policy of Azerbaijan are consist of:

- Determination of interest rates on centralized credit operations.
- Conducting banking transactions with securities in a free market.
- Providing centralized loans to credit institutions.
- Implementation of currency intervention and exchange rate policy.
- Restriction of banking operations

Monetary policy instruments implemented by the Central Bank are also reflected in Article 29 of the Law of the Republic of Azerbaijan "On the Central Bank of the Republic of Azerbaijan". Key instruments of monetary policy are:

- open market operations
- Defining interest rates;
- The reserve requirement
- Refinancing of credit institutions;
- Deposit operations;

The main objective of the monetary policy is the elimination of the banking crisis, restoration of trust to the banking system and stimulation of the population's savings. At the same time, monetary policy has the following objectives:

- restructuring of the banking system;
- Improving control over compliance with mandatory regulations by banks;
- regulation of the national currency course;
- Filling the state's foreign exchange reserves and preventing capital flows abroad.

=== Securities market ===
According to Article 1078 of Chapter 15 of the Civil Code of the Republic of Azerbaijan, the securities market participants have the following types of activities in the securities market of the Republic of Azerbaijan:

- broker activity;
- dealer activity;
- securities management activities;
- depository activity;
- activity on registering securities holders;
- clearing activities;
- fund stock exchange activity.

=== Open market operation ===
Open market operations are carried out by Central Bank in order to regulate the cash flows in circulation and to influence the interest rates in the interbank money market for realizing the monetary targets. Open market operations are as follows:

- Deposit operations
- Placement of short-term notes of the Central Bank.
- REPO operations
- Foreign exchange swap

=== Soft and hard monetary policy ===
While applying soft monetary policy, the Central Bank decreases interest rates on its loans, provides to banks with more loans and creates a downward trend in the national currency. Soft monetary policy is a policy aimed at limiting inflation. While implementing hard monetary policy, the Central Bank raises interest rates on its loans, reducing the money in circulation by selling securities, creates an upward trend in the national currency, restricts credit to banks.

== Tax policy ==
The development of the economy depends on the tax policy implemented in the country. Tax policy is implemented within the framework of economic policy directed to development of market economy in Azerbaijan and integration of it into the world economy.

The tax policy of the Azerbaijan is carry out based on the following principles:

- Establishment of the normative-legal basis of tax system, formation of tax culture;
- Creation of favorable conditions for taxpayers' activity and maximum protection of their rights;
- Coordinate the activities of tax administration governing bodies with other state bodies;
- Maintaining tax burden at an optimal level;
- Creating a simple tax system for taxpayers that stimulates entrepreneurship and investment activity

=== Reform Programs ===
A number of state programs have been adopted for the development of tax policy in the Republic of Azerbaijan:

Programs	Confirmation date	Activation period	Confirmed by
State Program on Improving Tax Administration in the Republic of Azerbaijan	September 12, 2005	2005-2007	the order of the President of the Republic of Azerbaijan
Plan of measures to improve the tax system in the Republic of Azerbaijan	December 24, 2007	2008-2012	the order of the Ministry of Taxes
Strategic Plan for Improving Tax Legislation and Administration for 2009-2012	November 3, 2008	2009-2012	the order of the Ministry of Taxes
Conception for the development of services provided by tax authorities to taxpayers	January 6, 2011	2011-2015	the order of the Ministry of Taxes
Strategic Plan for Tax System Development for 2013-2020	March 19, 2013	2013-2020	the order of the Ministry of Taxes

=== Ministry of Taxes ===
Main functions of the Taxes Ministry:

- Prepares proposals on improvement tax policy;
- Participates in the project of legislative acts regulating tax relations;
- Organizes the work of the state tax authorities related to completely transfer to the state budget in time, correct calculation of state taxes and other incomes assigned to them in accordance with tax legislation;
- Participates in the preparation of the forecast of the state budget on income tax;
- Provides the establishment of the automated information system of state tax authorities;
- Ensures review of complaints and compliments, takes measures to eliminate the reason and conditions that caused the violation of taxpayers' rights and legitimate interests
- Creates conditions for taxpayers to realize their rights.

== Customs policy ==
Historically Customs policy was the primary form of state regulation of foreign trade. The essence of the customs policy is to reflect the customs tariff legislation, the establishment of relations with various international customs associations, the establishment of free customs and trade zones. As customs policy is an integral part of the economic and foreign trade policy of state, it depends on the goals and objectives of overall economic strategy of the government.

Purpose of customs policy of the Republic of Azerbaijan:

- more effective regulation of customs control and commodity circulation in the customs territory,
- protection of the internal market,
- stimulating the development of the national economy,
- Implementation of the tasks arising from the economic policy of the state,
- carrying out customs business in accordance with international standards.

== Investment policy ==
Attracting investment in ensuring the sustainable and balanced development of Azerbaijan in the long-term plays a special role. Further improvement of the investment climate in the country is one of the main tasks to ensure the required volume and quality of investments. The following measures are undertaken for this purpose:

- protecting personal property and improving corporate governance;
- creating a more favorable competitive environment for all investors regardless of the form of ownership;
- increasing the role of the state in order to ensure a stable normative-legal regime;
- further improvement of the regulatory and legal framework for investment activity;
- improvement of the system of informing the investors about the enterprises for the purpose of selection and analysis of investment objects;
- increasing the contribution to the development of modern institutional infrastructure that ensures the efficient transformation of deposits into investments;

Investment activity in the Republic of Azerbaijan is regulated by two laws:

The decree № 952 on "The law of Azerbaijan Republic on investment activity» confirmed by the President of Azerbaijan dated January 13, 1995.

The decree № 57 on "The law of the Azerbaijan Republic about protection of foreign investments" confirmed by the President of Azerbaijan, dated 15 January 1992.

=== One-stop shop ===
Government implements “one-stop shop” policy in order to attract investments into the economy of Azerbaijan. The President of Azerbaijan signed an order "On measures to ensure the organization of business entities” based on principle of “One-stop shop” on October 25, 2007. The implementation of this system has begun since January 1, 2008. The number of procedures to start work was reduced from 15 to 1 and the duration of the procedure was reduced from 30 days to 3 as a result of the introduction of this system.

=== AzPROMO ===
The Azerbaijan Export and Investment Promotion Foundation (AzPROMO) formed by the Ministry of Economy in 2003, operates to attract foreign investments to non-oil sectors and promote the export of non-oil products. Foundation services to foreign companies which are interested in collecting information about the investment climate of Azerbaijan and interested in investing based on the principle of “one stop shop”. The organization also supports local companies trying to enter the foreign markets. Memorandums on “Cooperation and partnership” were signed between AzPROMO and more than 80 organizations from 37 countries.

== Structure of the financial market of Azerbaijan ==
The main financial instruments of the accounting segment in Azerbaijan are short-term liabilities of the state, recent notes of the National Bank of Azerbaijan and their issuance and placement. The financial market of Azerbaijan provides a redistribution of short-term loans and cash flows in the form inter-bank deposit for regulating of the balance of inter-bank money market, for fulfilling the requirements of supervisory authorities, for carrying out active operations.

== Ministry of Finance ==
According to the Statute approved by the Decree of the President of the Republic, the Ministry of Finance of the Republic of Azerbaijan is a central executive body that carries out financial policy and regulates state financial management. The main duties of the Finance Ministry are:

- Preparation of proposals on financial, budget and tax policy and implementation of this policy;
- Preparation and execution of the state budget project;
- Ensuring financial stability and implementing the necessary measures for the development of the financial market;
- Improvement of the budget system, budget-tax forecasting, accounting and reporting rules of the financing mechanism;
- control over the expenditure of budget, non-budget, foreign loans.

== Baku Stock Exchange ==
The Baku Stock Exchange is the main stock exchange of Azerbaijan.

The Baku Stock Exchange is a commercial organization created as a closed joint-stock company. The BSE was established in 2000, and its main purpose was to form an organized stock market in the country.

== Financial Market Supervisory Authority ==
Financial Market Supervisory Authority (FIMSA) was formed on February 3, 2016, by Decree №760 of Azerbaijani President, for the purpose of licensing, regulating and controlling of securities market, investment funds, insurance, credit organizations (bank, non-bank credit organization and postal operator) and payment systems, legalization (laundering) of monetary means or other property acquired by the person as a result of committing a crime, improvement of the control system in the field of prevention of terrorism financing.
