= Yapi Kredi Bank Azerbaijan =

Bank based in Azerbaijan

Yapı Kredi Bank Azərbaycan QSC
- Formerly: Koçbank Azərbaycan LTD
- Company type: QSC
- Industry: Financial services
- Founded: January 11, 2000 in Baku, Azerbaijan as Koçbank Azərbaycan LTD
- Headquarters: Baku, Azerbaijan
- Key people: Cenk Yüksel (CEO)
- Services: Banking
- Parent: Yapı Kredi
- Website: yapikredi.com.az

Yapi Kredi Bank Azerbaijan is a bank based in Azerbaijan, with its head office in Baku.

Kocbank Azerbaijan LTD CJSC Bank was founded in partnership of Kocbank Inc. (80%), controlled by Koc Holding - one of the authoritative industrial groups of Turkey, and International Finance Corporation of the World Bank (20%).

Kocbank Azerbaijan LTD was established by the authorized fund amounting to 5,000,000 (five million) under the provisions of the Central Bank of Azerbaijan and registered by the Ministry of Justice of Azerbaijan on October 21, 1998, and the bank applied to the National Bank for getting the required license for its activity. The bank personnel were employed and trained promptly in Kocbank Inc. of Turkey in connection with long-lasting banking, and repair and maintenance works were completed at the place of operation in the course of application. The bank was granted a license # 243, dated January 11, 2000, by the National Bank of Azerbaijan Republic to commence its operation. The bank performs the activities as provided by the license issued by the National Bank of Azerbaijan Republic.

Koc Group and Uni Credito Italiano SPA entered into a contract of intent about 50% - 50% cooperation on “Koc Financial Services Inc.” to incorporate the companies of Koc Group acting in the financial sector and to enhance effectivity through owning a great part of the shares. The Co-operation Contract was concluded in May 2002 in Milan and the process completed on October 21, 2002. And consequently, the shares of Koc Group in the financial sector (Kocbank, Koc Lease, Koc Factoring, Koc Invest, Kocbank Netherlands, N.V., Kocbank Azerbaijan CJSC and Koc Assets Management) were allocated between “Koc Financial Services” and Uni Credito Italiano, and Koc Group turned into equal in rights partner of “Koc Financial Services”.

The bank entered into the family of Koc Financial Services at Yapı Kredi Bank Inc. in Turkey in August 2005 as well.

Kocbank Azerbaijan LTD CJSC Bank increased its Authorized Capital up to 2,000,000 (two million) USD in August 2004.

Kocbank Azerbaijan has been carrying out its operation under the name “Yapı Kredi Bank Azerbaijan” CJSC as of the beginning of 2007. Modification of the bank's name was subject to incorporation between the founder (Kocbank) and other partner bank (Yapı Kredi Bank). The principal reason for banks` incorporation in the international arena was to increase in market shares in the period of intense competition and improvement of possibilities offered to investors to invest in realization of large projects as well. The incorporation of Kocbank and Yapı Kredi Bank in the Turkish banking market in the course of the globalization process was based on this factor. The product assortment offered by Yapı Kredi Bank (Azerbaijan) CJSC in the field of banking services will be upgraded agreeable to the legislation of the Azerbaijan Republic and occupy a worthy place in the financial market with its large product assortment, technological innovations and preferences. To realize this target, the bank covers the below-mentioned directions in its activity: a) To take an active part in the international investment market; b) To meet the needs of corporate and private customers; c) To apply international sources in a manner to meet the Azerbaijani market on financing projects; d) To establish much more customer service points through increasing number of departments; e) To take an active stand in the credit market of Azerbaijan complying with international risk management standards;

The Lading structure of the bank is formed by the Founders` (Shareholder`) General Meeting, the supervisory board, the Audit Committee and management board. The bank operates “Central Branch”, “28 May”, “Azadlig”, “Sebail”, “Ahmedli”, “Elmler Akademiyasi”, "Babek", “Hezi Aslanov”, “Nerimanov”, “Jafar Jabbarli”, “Memar Ajami”, “Yasamal” branches and with 2 Customer Service Departments in Baku, “Ganja” branch in Ganja city and “Sumgait” branch in Sumgait city.

By the end of 2014, the volume of assets of Yapı Kredi Bank Azerbaijan reached of 352,442,986 manats. Within the report period, the deposit portfolio of the bank reached 167,485,49 manats and the loan portfolio 267,467,38 manats. The bank provides 3,056 legal and 186,566 natural persons with different banking services. In general, total number of personnel employed by the bank is more than 400 persons.

The bank completes opening of the branch, intending expansion of its branch network. The bank enjoys correspondent accounts in Germany, USA, Italy, Turkey, Netherlands and Russia. Improvement of product assortment and application of modern technologies take an important part in the line of bank duties. The bank has installed 26 ATM and 2777 POS Terminals by the end of 31 March 2015. In this direction, the bank has great plans for the nearest future.

== See also ==
- List of banks
- List of banks in Azerbaijan
