= International Bank of Azerbaijan =

Joint-stock bank

ABB
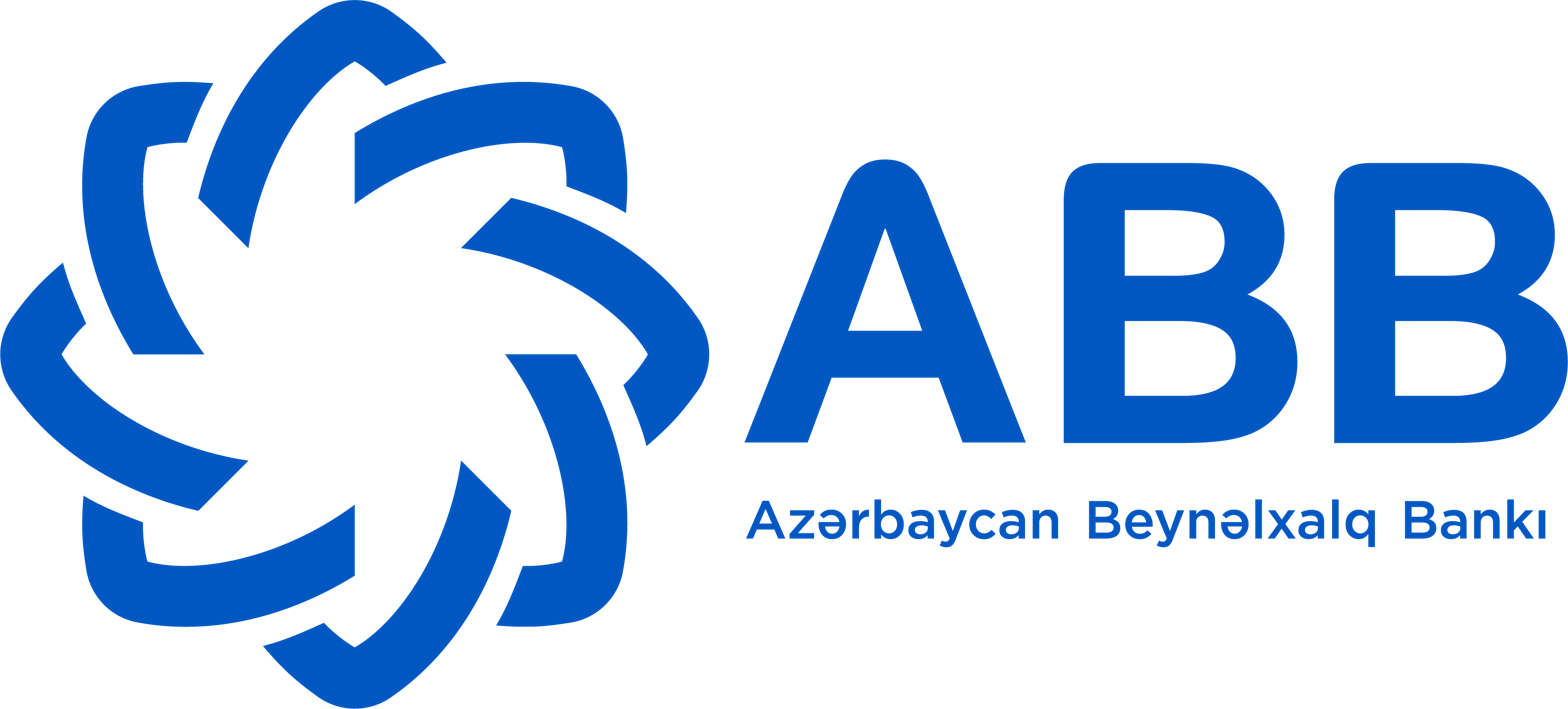
- Type: Open Joint Stock Company
- Industry: Banking
- Founded: 10 January 1992; 34 years ago
- Headquarters: Baku, Azerbaijan
- Area served: International
- Key people: Abbas Ibrahimov, CEO
- Total assets: 13.25 billion ₼ ($7.8 billion)
- Number of employees: More than 3,100
- Subsidiaries: AzeriCard, IBA-Moscow, International Leasing Company LLC, OJSC International Bank of Azerbaijan, Asset Management Arm, IBA-Invest Investment Company CJSC, International Bank of Azerbaijan-Georgia, JSC "International Bank of Azerbaijan – Georgia, International Insurance Company Limited Liability, International Insurance Company
- Website: www.abb-bank.az

ABB (from Azerbaijani: Azərbaycan Beynəlxalq Bankı [ɑːzæɾbɑjˈdʒɑn bejnælˈxɑlk ˈbɑŋkɯ]; formerly known as International Bank of Azerbaijan) is the largest bank in Azerbaijan. It is an open joint-stock company whose shares are owned by the Azerbaijani state. Its head office is located in Azerbaijan.

The bank rebranded itself as ABB in 2021 following reporting on several corruption scandals. The bank played a central role in the Azerbaijani laundromat scandal.

== History ==
ABB OJSC was founded on January 10, 1992, as a joint-stock bank. ABB is currently one of the leading banks in the South Caucasus region in terms of assets, customer base, and international operating portfolio. With 66 branches and 13 sub-branches in different regions of Azerbaijan, the bank provides universal banking services to private and corporate clients. The number of legal entities served by the bank is about 18,000, and individual clients are more than 2.2 million. The bank employs more than 3100 people.

According to the Decree of the President of the Republic of Azerbaijan No. 1174 dated November 5, 2020, “On ensuring the activities of the Azerbaijan Investment Holding”, the Bank ABB Open Joint-Stock Company was transferred to the management of the Azerbaijan Investment Holding.

IBA operates as a universal bank, leveraging its national presence along with subsidiary banks in Russia, Georgia, Uzbekistan, and Qatar, alongside international representative offices strategically located in London, Frankfurt, Luxembourg, Dubai, and New York.

== Service network ==
ABB closely participates in large-scale state projects in sectors such as oil chemistry, transport, communications, energy, etc. It also actively supports the financing of large, small, and medium-sized businesses.

In 1996, ABB established the company "AzerCard", which served as a base for the card processing business in the country. In 1997, the bank began cooperation with Visa and MasterCard, and later announced partnerships with international payment systems including American Express, Union Pay, Diners Club, and JCB.

ABB has the largest local network of ATMs, consisting of more than 900 machines, and over 13,000 POS terminals located at trade and service points across Azerbaijan. ABB also provides pension and wage payments through payment cards. At present, the number of active payment cards of the bank is over 1.3 million.

In 2019, ABB introduced the multifunctional product Tamkart. In 2020, the bank introduced ABB Miles cards to customers.

== See also ==
- International Bank of Azerbaijan-Georgia
- IBA-Moscow
- Azerbaijani manat
- Banking in Azerbaijan
- Central Bank of Azerbaijan
- Economy of Azerbaijan
- List of banks in Azerbaijan
