= Koçbank =

- Type: Bank
- Founded: 1981
- Defunct: 2006
- Fate: merged into Yapı ve Kredi Bankası
- Headquarters: Istanbul, Turkey
- Parent: Koç Holding
- Website: www.kocbank.com.tr

Koçbank was a Turkish bank. It was merged into Yapı ve Kredi Bankası in 2006. At the time Koçbank was owned by, Koç Finansal Hizmetler (KFH; Koç Financial Services, KFS), an equal partnership between Koç Holding and Italian banking giant Unicredit.

In 2003 Koçbank had 143 branches, including branches in Azerbaijan, the Netherlands and Bahrain.

== History ==
Koçbank was founded in 1981 as the American Express Bank, based in Istanbul. Koç Holding acquired a 51% stake in the bank in 1986, renaming it Koç-American Bank, and in 1992 the bank became a wholly owned subsidiary of Koç Holding, and was renamed as Koçbank A.Ş. It grew to be one of the most important institutions in the sector with its young history and its financial subsidiaries established in a short term to address the financial needs of its customers.

=== Restructuring and UniCredit partnership (2001 - 2006) ===
Following the decision of the Koç Group to expand in the financial sector, Turkey's first financial holding company, Koç Financial Services (KFS), was established in March 2001 as a management company and all the financial companies owned by the Koç Group, including Koçbank, were united under this umbrella.

In October 2002 KFS signed a strategic partnership with UniCredit (UCI), a leading international banking group of Italian origin present in 20 countries. In October 2002, the Koç Group and UniCredit signed a partnership agreement and became 50/50 shareholders in KFS; making KFS the first foreign partnership to be established in the financial sector in Turkey.

=== Merger with Yapı Kredi (2005 - 2006) ===
On 29 September 2005, Koçbank enhanced its position in the Turkish banking market with the acquisition of 57.4% of the share capital of Yapı ve Kredi Bankası, one of Turkey's oldest and largest financial groups.

Following the merger in October 2006, 80.2% of Yapı Kredi was owned by KFS while minorities’ stake in the bank was 19.8%. Following the completion of the share exchange between KFS and Yapı Kredi in October 2007 for the transfer of the shares owned by KFS in YK Leasing, YK factoring and YK Azerbaijan to Yapı Kredi, the ownership of KFS in Yapı Kredi increased to 81.8% while the minorities share has changed to 18.2%.

Following the legal merger, Yapı Kredi is positioned as the fourth largest privately owned commercial bank by asset size in Turkey, with interest in credit cards, assets under management, non-cash loans, leasing, factoring, private pension funds and non-life insurance. The combined KFS Group's financial services network now consists of over 13 million customers and 684 branches across the country.
