= Birbank =

Mobile banking application

- Company type: Digital banking platform
- Industry: Financial services
- Founded: 2018
- Headquarters: Baku, Azerbaijan
- Area served: Azerbaijan
- Products: Mobile banking, payments, loans, deposits, investment services, cards, installment, business banking, private banking, trading services (shares, stocks)
- Services: Retail banking, business banking, digital payments
- Owner: Kapital Bank
- Parent: PASHA Holding
- Website: birbank.az

Birbank is a mobile banking application and digital banking service of Kapital Bank in Azerbaijan.

As of 2025, Birbank has more than 3 million active users.

== History ==
Birbank was introduced in 2018 as the digital transformation arm of Kapital Bank to transition traditional banking services to a mobile-first model. In 2024, the platform reached a milestone of 3,469,220 users.

By 2025, the ecosystem expanded to include specialized sub-platforms: Birbank Biznes for entrepreneurs, Birbank Invest for retail investors, and Birbank Private for high-net-worth individuals.

At the same year, the platform secured multiple category wins at the Stevie Awards and earned both the Innovation and Golden Bridge honors at the Globee Awards.

== Social initiatives ==
Birbank has participated in a number of initiatives related to financial literacy, accessibility, and entrepreneurship.

In March 2025, Birbank Biznes organized a fair for women entrepreneurs in connection with International Women's Day, providing a platform for small businesses to present their products and services.

In April 2025, Birbank Biznes organized a sales fair for entrepreneurs in Ganja and surrounding regions. About 30 entrepreneurs participated, showcasing their products and services to a wider audience and establishing new business connections.

Birbank Biznes has also participated in programs supporting women entrepreneurs. In partnership with Visa Inc., the She’s Next Empowered by Visa initiative was launched in Azerbaijan on 16 May 2025, providing training, mentorship, and financial support for small and medium-sized enterprises. The program concluded in July 2025 with a final competition held in Baku.

The platform also supports charitable donations through its mobile application, allowing users to contribute to Karabakh Revival Fund, Yaşat Fund, Red Hearts Fund, and the Azerbaijani Diaspora Support Fund.

== Services ==
Birbank provides remote access to banking services through a mobile application, allowing users to conduct financial operations without visiting bank branches. These include account management, payments, transfers, lending services, and deposits.

The application supports transfers between accounts and to other banks, bill payments, and government-related payments. It also includes features such as instant transfers via mobile number or identification code through Azerbaijan’s instant payment system, as well as QR code-based payments for goods, services, and public transport. Some features allow installment-based payments and loyalty-based cashback systems.

Under the Birbank brand, Kapital Bank offers several specialized digital services:

- Birbank Biznes, a digital banking platform for individual entrepreneurs and legal entities, providing access to business accounts, loans, payments, and POS functions.
- Birbank Invest, an investment platform launched in 2025, enabling users to access financial instruments such as shares and exchange-traded funds (ETFs).
- Birbank Private, a private banking service offering personalized financial services for high-net-worth clients.
