= Taleh Kazimov =

Governor of the Central Bank of Azerbaijan

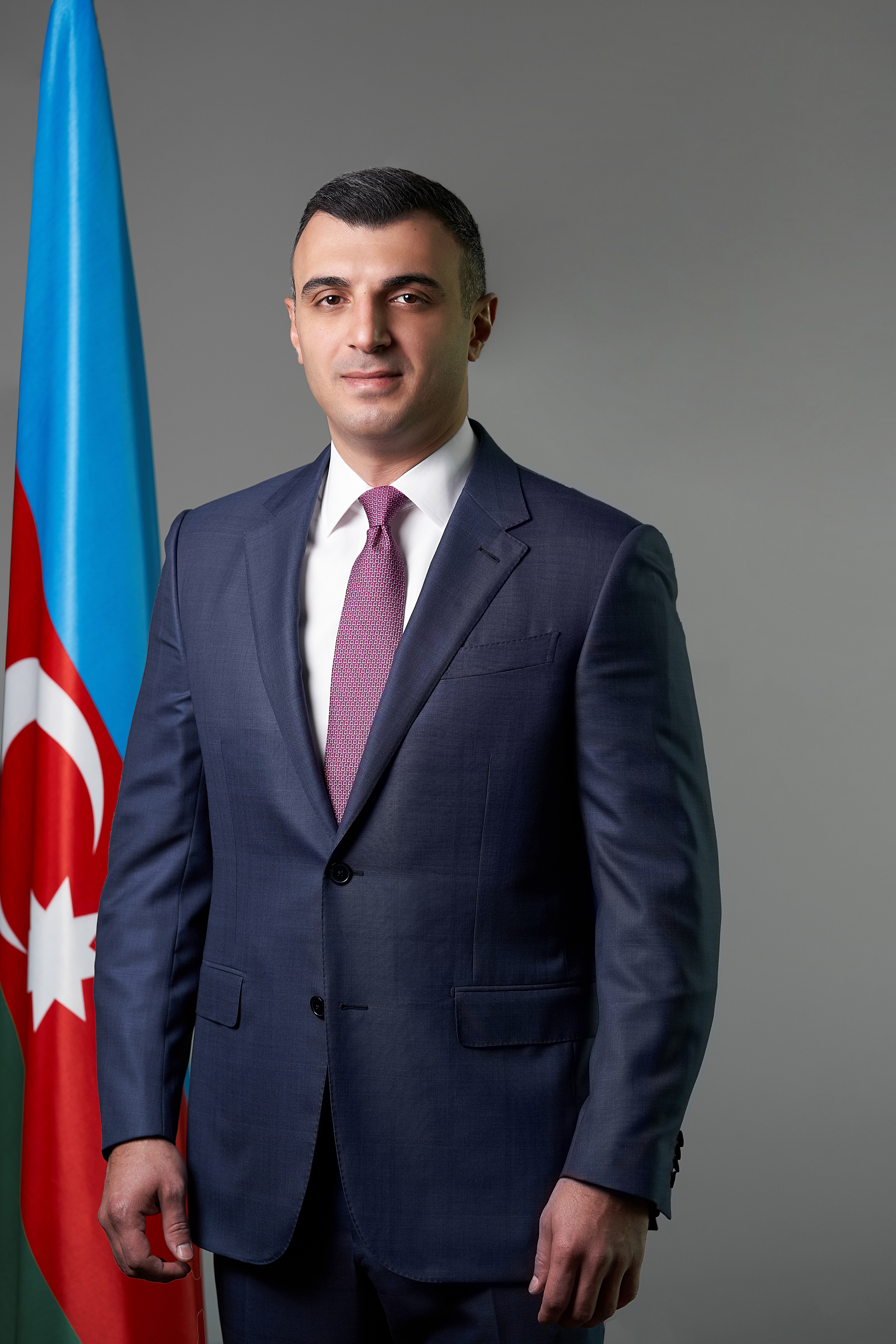

Governor of the Central Bank of the Republic of Azerbaijan
- Incumbent
- Assumed office April 2022
- President: Ilham Aliyev
- Preceded by: Elman Rustamov

Personal details
- Born: 11 September 1983 (age 42) Baku, Azerbaijan
- Education: Azerbaijan Technical University; Georgia State University; Azerbaijan State Oil Academy; London Business School; Harvard University
- Occupation: Banker

Taleh Kazimov (Azerbaijani: Taleh Kazımov, born September 11, 1983, in Baku) is the Governor of the Central Bank of the Republic of Azerbaijan.

== Life ==
Taleh Kazimov was born on September 11, 1983, in Baku, Azerbaijan. He studied at the Azerbaijan Technical University during 2000-2004 and has a Bachelor Degree in Automation and Computer engineering. In 2004-2006 he received an MBA degree within the joint program of Georgia State University and Azerbaijan State Oil Academy. He also graduated from the London Business School, UK (Executive Education Program in Business Administration) in 2012 and the Harvard University, USA (Executive Education Program in Business Administration) in 2014.

== Career ==
Taleh Kazimov started his professional career during his studies and worked as an office assistant and information technology operator at ATTAS PR and European Tobacco. Moving to the financial sector in 2004, in 2004-2006, he held various positions in Bank Standard CJSC, working as a specialist in the Treasury and Funds division of the Finance and Accounting Department, Management and Budget Planning division of the Financial Control Department. Later he worked as a leading specialist in the Corporate Customer Lending division of the Loan Policy Department. From 2006 to 2007, Kazimov was an auditor at Ernst & Young. From January 2007 to July 2007, he was General Director of Fineko Analytics and Information Agency OJSC.

Kazimov started working for PASHA Bank in July 2007 as a manager of the Risk Management Department, and in 2009 he became Treasury and Money Market Department director. On December 7, 2011, Kazimov was elected a board member of PASHA Bank. From 2015 to 2022, he was Chairman of the Management Board and Chief Executive Officer of PASHA Bank.

On April 11, 2022, Parliamentary Committee on Economic Policy, Industry and Entrepreneurship considered electing Kazimov as a member of the Board of the Central Bank of Azerbaijan on the recommendation of Azerbaijan President Ilham Aliyev. The appointment was approved on April 12, 2022. On April 13, 2022, Kazimov was appointed the bank's Governor.

== Memberships ==
- 2015 – 2018 member of the Supervisory Board of PASHA Bank Georgia OJSC.
- 2015–2019 member of the Board of Directors and Vice President of the American Chamber of Commerce in Azerbaijan (AMCHAM).
- 2015–2019 member of the Board of Directors of PASHA Investment Bank (Turkey).
- Since 2019 Taleh Kazimov is a member of the Board of Directors of the US-Azerbaijan Chamber of Commerce (USACC).
- Since April 13, 2022 member of the Supervisory Board of the State Oil Fund of the Republic of Azerbaijan.
