= Kapital Bank =

Commercial bank in Azerbaijan

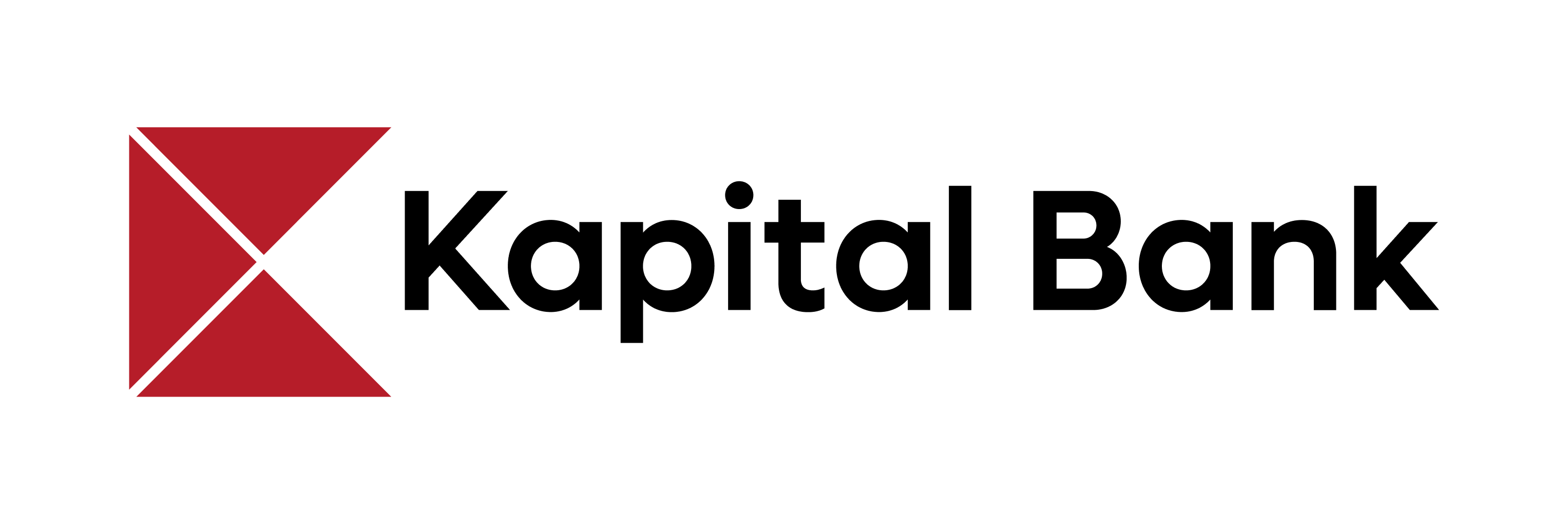
- Kapital Bank logo
- Company type: Open Joint-Stock Company
- Industry: Banking
- Founded: 1874
- Headquarters: Baku, Azerbaijan
- Area served: Azerbaijan

Kapital Bank is a commercial bank operating in Azerbaijan. Founded in 1874 as Azerbaijan Savings Bank, it is headquartered in Baku.

== History ==
On July 24, 1874, a savings treasury was established in Baku. The first savings offices operated as part of the Baku branch of the State Bank of the Russian Empire. The executive head of the branch was Ivan Samsonovich Khandozhevsky. Prominent Azerbaijanis such as Haji Zeynalabdin Taghiyev, Haji Baba Hashimov, and Haji Shikhali Dadashov were also part of the Accounting Committee.

Following the proclamation of the Azerbaijan Democratic Republic (ADR), the State Bank of Azerbaijan was opened on September 30, 1919, and the activity of the savings offices resumed on December 1, 1919.

After the fall of the ADR on April 28, 1920, by decision of the Azerbaijani Revolutionary Committee on June 9, 1920, the Baku branch of the Russian State Bank was abolished and merged into the newly established People's Bank. In January 1924, state labor savings banks operating under the State Bank of the USSR were established in Azerbaijan. In 1988, these were transformed into the Azerbaijan branch of the USSR Savings Bank. On February 11, 1992, the Azerbaijan Savings Bank was formed based on this bank. By the decision of the Cabinet of Ministers of Azerbaijan dated February 21, 2000 (No. 40s), the Azerbaijan Savings Bank, Agrarian-Industrial Bank, and Industrial-Investment Bank merged to form the United Universal Joint-Stock Bank of Azerbaijan (BUSBank).

On December 29, 2004, during an extraordinary meeting of the bank's shareholders, it was decided to rename BUSBank to Kapital Bank.

== See also ==
- Banking in Azerbaijan
- Central Bank of Azerbaijan
- List of banks in Azerbaijan
- Azerbaijani manat
- Economy of Azerbaijan
