= Azerbaijan Deposit Insurance Foundation =

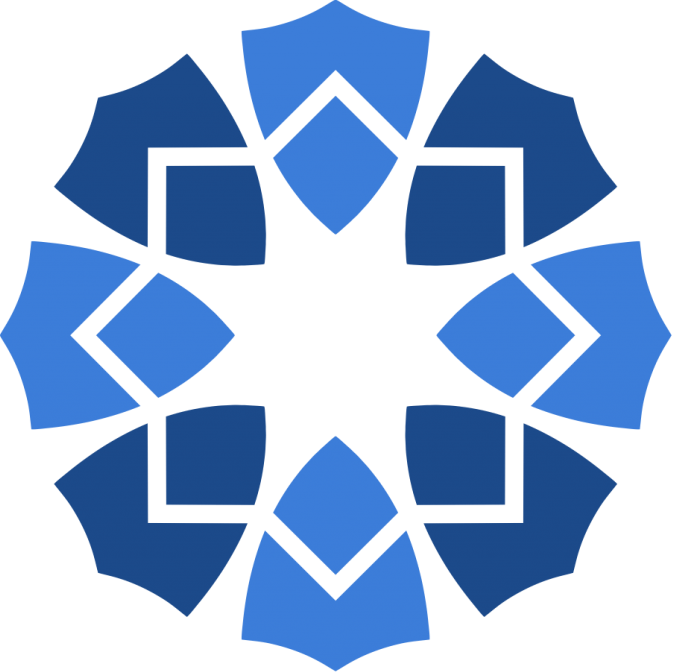
- Native name: Azərbaycan Əmanətlərin Sığortalanması Fondu
- Type: Deposit insurance fund
- Industry: Finance
- Founded: February 9, 2007; 19 years ago in Baku, Azerbaijan
- Headquarters: Baku, Azerbaijan
- Website: www.adif.az/en

The Azerbaijan Deposit Insurance Foundation (ADIF, Azerbaijani: Azərbaycan Əmanətlərin Sığortalanması Fondu) is the Azerbaijani deposit insurance entity that is responsible for preventing the risk of deposit loss of individuals in the event of loss of solvency by banks or branches of foreign banks, ensuring the stability and development of the financial and banking system of the Republic of Azerbaijan.

== History ==
The Foundation was established by the order of the President of Azerbaijan dated February 9, 2007 "On approval and introduction of the Law “On Deposit Insurance””, adopted by the National Assembly of Azerbaijan on December 29, 2006.

The Foundation's main activities are collecting insurance premiums from banks, ensuring the safety of the fund's cash deposits, and, in some cases, paying insurance amounts to depositors.

== Activity ==
From March 1, 2016, to December 4, 2020, the insurance system applies to the entire population's deposit volume.

According to the decision of the Fund's Board of Trustees, starting from June 1, 2020, the maximum rate on bank deposits of the population in the national currency of Azerbaijan is increased from 10% to 12%.

Since 2020, the Chief Executive Officer executive Director of the Foundation is Tural Piriyev.

== See also ==
- Banking in Azerbaijan
