= Enerji Yapi-Yol Sen v Turkey =

- Court: European Court of Human Rights
- Citation: [2009] ECHR 2251

Keywords
- Right to strike

Enerji Yapi-Yol Sen v Turkey [2009] ECHR 2251 is a European labour law case, relevant for UK labour law concerning the right to strike.

== Facts ==
In April 1996, the Prime Minister’s Public Service Policy Directorate published a circular banning a one day public sector workers strike, organised by the trade union. It aimed to get a collective agreement. Members struck anyway, and were disciplined.

== Judgment ==
The European Court of Human Rights held that there was a right to strike, albeit not unlimited.

24. In the present case, the Court considers that, by reference to those principles, the applicant trade union has suffered directly from the effects of the contested circular and can therefore claim to be the victim of interference in the exercise of its right to freedom of association. The Court observes that Circular No 1996/21 prohibited civil servants from taking part in a national strike day organised as part of the action planned by the Federation of Public Sector Trade Unions to recognise the right of civil servants to a collective agreement. Those who participated in the day were disciplined (see paragraph 9 above). What the Convention requires, however, is that the legislation allow trade unions, in a manner not contrary to Article 11, to fight for the defence of their members' interests (Schmidt and Dahlström v. Sweden, 6 February 1976, §§ 34 and 36, series A no 21; Syndicat national de la police belge v. Belgium, 27 October 1975, § 39, series A no 19; Syndicat suédois des conducteurs de locomotives v. Sweden, 6 February 1976, § 40, series A no 20). A strike, which allows a trade union to make its voice heard, is an important aspect for trade union members in protecting their interests (Schmidt and Dahlström, cited above, § 36). The Court also notes that the right to strike is recognised by the supervisory bodies of the International Labour Organisation (ILO) as an inseparable corollary of the right of trade union association protected by ILO Convention C87 on freedom of association and protection of the right to organise (for the Court's consideration of elements of international law other than the Convention, see Demir and Baykara, cited above). It recalls that the European Social Charter also recognises the right to strike as a means of ensuring the effective exercise of the right to collective bargaining. Consequently, the Court rejects the Government's objection.

B. On the justification for the interference

25. Such interference violates article 11 of the Convention, unless it was "prescribed by law", directed towards a legitimate purpose or purposes within the meaning of article 11, paragraph 2, of the Convention and "necessary in a democratic society" to achieve those purposes.

1. "Provided by law"

26. The Court recalls that the words "provided for by law" mean in the first place that the measure in question must have a basis in domestic law, that it understands the term "law" in its material rather than formal sense, and that it has also included texts of "sub-legislative" rank enacted by the competent authorities under a delegated normative power (Frérot v. France, no. 70204/01, § 57, 12 June 2007; Lavents v. Latvia, no. 58442/00, § 135, 28 November 2002).

27. It considers that, in the present case, Circular No 1996/21 adopted in the exercise of a legislative power constituted the legal basis for the interference at issue.

2. "Legitimate Purpose"

28. The Court doubts that the interference in the present case pursued a legitimate aim within the meaning of Article 11(2) of the Convention. However, it considers it unnecessary to decide the question in the light of the conclusion it reaches as to the need for such interference (point 3 below) (Urcan and Others v. Turkey, Nos 23018/04, 23034/04, 23042/04, 23071/04, 23073/04, 23081/04, 23086/04, 23091/04, 23094/04, 23444/04 and 23676/04, § 29, 17 July 2008).

3. "Necessary in a "democratic" society"

29. Referring to the judgments in Syndicat national de la police belge v. Belgium (cited above) and Schmidt and Dahlström (cited above), the Government states that Article 11 of the Convention does not guarantee trade unions precise treatment by the State. It argues that what the Convention requires is to enable trade unions to fight for the interests of their members with means that the state is free to determine. For the Government, the contested circular merely recalled the application of the legislation in force, which was in conformity with Article 11 § 2 of the Convention. Furthermore, it recalls that on 10 December 2002 Circular No. 2001/53 repealed Circular No. 1996/21 pursuant to Act No. 4688 of 25 June 2001, which defined the modalities for the use by civil servants of their right to conduct collective bargaining.

30. The complainant reiterated his observations and opposed the Government's arguments. According to him, the contested circular, by imposing strike prohibitions, imposed disproportionate restrictions on the exercise of his freedom of association.

31. As regards the general principles relating to negative and positive obligations arising for States under Article 11 of the Convention, the Court refers to its case law set out in Demir and Baykara (cited above, §§ 110 and 119). As for the application of these principles in the present case, it observes that the disputed circular had been adopted five days before the actions planned by the Federation of Public Sector Trade Unions for the recognition of the right to a collective agreement for civil servants, at a time when work was under way to harmonise Turkish legislation with international conventions on the trade union rights of civil servants and when the legal situation of civil servants remained uncertain.

32. The Court recognizes that the right to strike is not absolute. It may be subject to certain conditions and restrictions. Thus, the principle of freedom of association may be compatible with the prohibition of the right to strike of civil servants exercising functions of authority on behalf of the State. However, while the prohibition of the right to strike may concern certain categories of civil servants (see, mutatis mutandis, Pellegrin v. France [GC], no. 28541/95, §§ 64-67, ECHR 1999-VIII), it cannot extend to civil servants in general, as in this case, or to public workers in commercial or industrial undertakings of the State. Thus, legal restrictions on the right to strike should define as clearly and narrowly as possible the categories of officials concerned. In the Court's view, in the present case, the circular at issue was drafted in general terms which absolutely prohibited all staff members from having the right to strike, without balancing the imperatives of the purposes enumerated in article 11, paragraph 2, of the Convention. Furthermore, the Court notes that there is no indication in the file that the national day of action of 18 April 1996 had been prohibited. The ban imposed by the circular concerned only the participation of civil servants in this day of action. By joining it, the members of the board of the applicant union merely exercised their freedom of peaceful assembly (Ezelin v. France, judgment of 26 April 1991, § 41, Series A no. 202). They were disciplined on the basis of the circular (see paragraph 9 above). The Court considers that these sanctions are likely to dissuade trade union members and any other person wishing to do so from participating legitimately in such a strike day or in actions aimed at defending the interests of their members (Urcan and others, cited above, § 34, and Karaçay v. Turkey, no. 6615/03, § 36, 27 March 2007). The Court notes that the Government has not demonstrated the necessity in a democratic society of the restriction in question.

33. Thus, the Court, having conducted its own examination, concluded that the adoption of this circular and its application did not correspond to a "compelling social need" and that there had been a disproportionate infringement of the union's effective enjoyment of the rights enshrined in article 11 of the Convention.

34. Consequently, there was a violation of article 11 of the Convention.
