= Yapı Kredi =

Turkish bank

Yapı ve Kredi Bankası A.Ş.

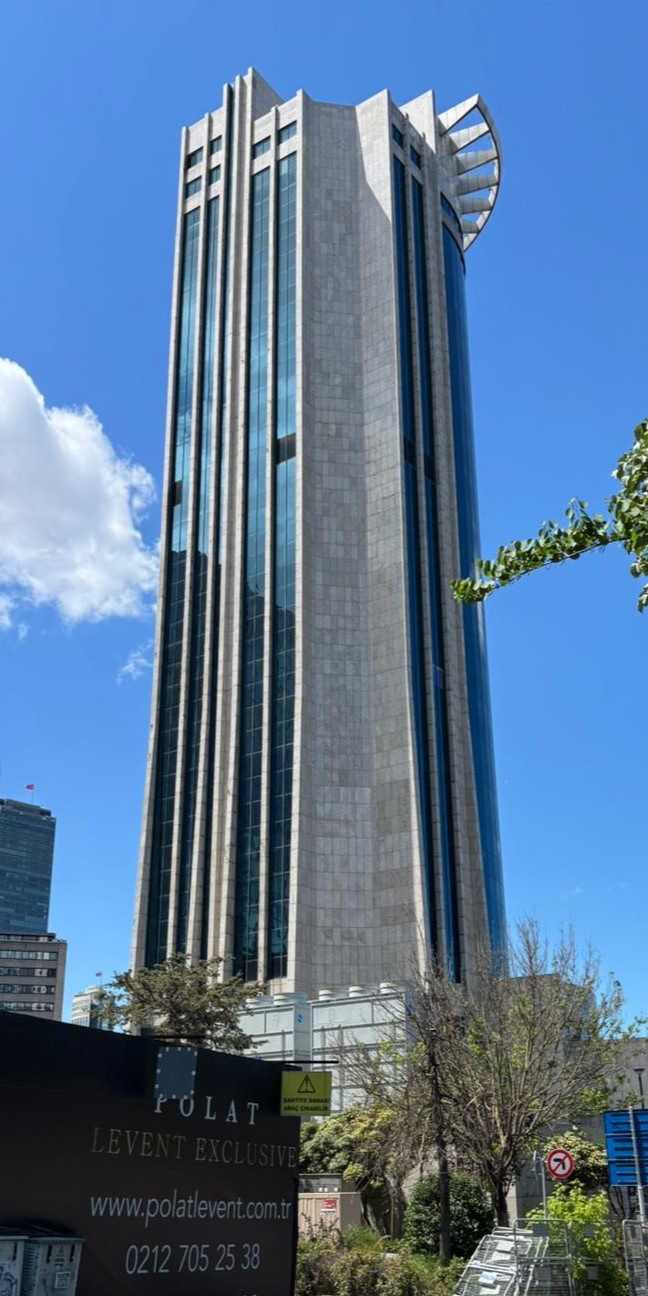
- HQ of banking in Levent, Istanbul
- Type: Anonim Şirket
- Traded as: BİST: YKBNK
- Industry: Banking, Financial services
- Founded: 6 July 1944; 82 years ago
- Headquarters: Büyükdere Avenue, Zincirlikuyu, Levent, Beşiktaş, Istanbul, Turkey
- Number of locations: 846 branches (2019)
- Area served: Worldwide
- Key people: Ali Koç (Chairman); Gökhan Erün (CEO)
- Products: Financial services, credit cards, consumer banking, corporate banking, investment banking, mortgage loans, private banking
- Revenue: ▲US$13.87 billion (2024)
- Operating income: ▼US$933 million (2024)
- Net income: ▼US$841 million (2024)
- Total assets: ▲US$73.91 billion (2024)
- Total equity: ▼US$5.58 billion (2024)
- Number of employees: 16,162 (2023)
- Subsidiaries: List: Yapı Kredi Bank Moscow Yapı Kredi Bank Nederland N.V. Yapı Kredi Bank Azerbaijan Yapı Kredi Sigorta A.Ş. Yapı Kredi Emeklilik A.Ş. Yapı Kredi Holding B.V. Yapı Kredi Yatırım Menkul Değerler A.Ş. Yapı Kredi Faktoring A.Ş. Yapı Kredi Finansal Kiralama A.O. Yapı Kredi Portföy Yönetimi A.Ş. Yapı Kredi-Koray Gayrimenkul Yatırım Ortaklığı A.Ş. Yapı Kredi Yatırım Ortaklığı A.Ş. Yapı Kredi Kültür-Sanat Yayıncılık Ticaret ve Sanayi A.Ş.
- Rating: S&P: unknown Moody's: B1; Fitch: BB-
- Website: yapikredi.com.tr

Yapı Kredi (lit. 'Construction and Credit Bank') is one of the first nationwide commercial banks in Turkey, and is the fourth largest private bank in Turkey by its asset size. It was established in 1944 by Kazım Taşkent. Assets of the bank include credit cards, assets under management, non-cash loans, leasing, factoring, private pension funds and non-life insurance. The combined financial services network of the bank consists of 835 branches across the country with over 13 million customers. The bank offers vehicle loans, consumer loans, housing loans and commercial loan support.

Yapı Kredi Emeklilik A.Ş is one of the largest pension and life insurance providers in Turkey and has been a major force in the growth and development of pension schemes and group insurance in the country. Its sister company, Yapı Kredi Sigorta A.Ş., is the second-largest health insurer in Turkey. Together, the companies provide coverage to approximately 700,000 insureds.

== History ==
Yapı Kredi was acquired by Mehmet Emin Karamehmet's Çukurova Holding in 1984, and Hüsnü Özyeğin was its general manager until 1987. In 2003, Çukurova Holding reached an agreement with the Turkish bank regulator to sell the majority of its shares in Yapı Kredi within two years. In 2005, the majority of shares in Yapı Kredi were acquired by the owners of Koçbank. Koç Finansal Hizmetler (KFH; Koç Financial Services, KFS), was an equal partnership between Koç Holding and Italian banking giant UniCredit. In 2006, Koçbank was merged into Yapı Kredi, leaving 80% of Yapı Kredi owned by KFS. In November 2019, Unicredit exited the joint venture KFS which controls the bank and acquired a smaller stake in the company. UniCredit finally exited in 2021 by selling its remaining 18% stake to Koç Holding. Subsequently the Koç Group held over 60% of Yapı Kredi's capital.

In 2024, Yapı Kredi expanded to Germany.

== See also ==
- Koç Holding
- Lists of banks
- List of banks in Turkey

== Sources ==
- Yapı Kredi 2019 Annual Report (PDF), Yapı Kredi, 2019
- Yapı Kredi 2023 Integrated Annual Report (PDF), Yapı Kredi, 2023
- Yapı Kredi 2024 Integrated Annual Report (PDF), Yapı Kredi, 2024
