= IBA-Moscow =

- Company type: Limited liability Subsidiary
- Industry: Banking
- Founded: 2002; 24 years ago
- Headquarters: Moscow, Russia
- Key people: Fuad Abdullayev (CEO)
- Products: Corporate banking; Credit cards; Currency exchange; Debit cards; Insurance; Loans; Mobile banking; Payroll services; Personal banking; Safe deposit boxes; Transfers
- Net income: ▲RUB$350 million (2013); RUB$259 million (2012)
- Total assets: ▲RUB$32.8 billion (2013); RUB$27.79 billion (2012)
- Total equity: ▲RUB$3 billion (2013); RUB$2.41 billion (2012)
- Number of employees: 300 (2012)
- Parent: International Bank of Azerbaijan
- Divisions: Corporate Banking; Retail Banking
- Website: ibamoscow.ru

IBA-Moscow is a subsidiary bank of the International Bank of Azerbaijan located in Moscow, Russia. The bank is a registered Russian limited liability company and employs approximately 300 people.

== History and Overview ==
IBA-Moscow was started in 2002. The primary purpose is to deepen trade and economic ties between Russia and Azerbaijan and to provide services to Azerbaijani citizens who live in Russia. One of the founding principles of the bank was to strengthen trade and economic relations between Azerbaijan and Russia, while giving banking services to Azerbaijani citizens who live or work in Russia.

The bank provides commercial banking and financial products to people, companies, and banks in Russia. The bank is divided into two major divisions: Corporate Banking and Retail Banking. Other services include transfers, debit cards, loans, safe deposit boxes, credit cards, insurance, payroll services and currency exchange.

== Financials ==
The bank's assets increased by 18 percent in 2013, totaling over 32.8 billion rubles. After 2013, the company's equity equaled just over 3 billion rubles, a 24 percent increase from 2012. Net income in 2013 increased by 35 percent to 350 million rubles. These figures were audited and confirmed by Deloitte.

== Operations and Customers ==
The bank has 50 ATMs and branches in major Russian cities, including Saint Petersburg and Ekaterinburg, which was opened on September 30, 2013. The grand opening was attended by vice-governor of the Sverdlovsk Province Yakov Silin, Azerbaijan's consul general Sultan Gasimov, IBA-Moscow Chief Fuad Abdullayev, deputy chairman of Legislative Assembly of the Sverdlovsk Province Yelena Chechunova, head of Russian Foreign Ministry`s representation in Yekaterinburg Alexander Kharlov, and chairman of Azerbaijani Diaspora in the province Shahin Shikhlinsky.

Notable corporate customers include:

- AZAL
- Belrusneftegaz
- Crocus International
- InterProConsulting
- Metropolis
- Mosazervinzavod
- Moskvich Hotel
- Rosokhotrybolovsoyuz
- RusAvto
- Rusbiznessinvest

IBA-Moscow offers customers an iPhone app called MobilBank that shows balances, offers debit/credit card services, and money transfers.

== See also ==
- Azerbaijan
- Banking in Russia
- International Bank of Azerbaijan
- International banking
