= International Bank of Azerbaijan-Georgia =

Azerbaijani bank operating in Georgia

Joint Stock Company "International Bank of Azerbaijan - Georgia"
- Trade name: JSC Bank "IBA - Georgia"
- Native name: აზერბაიჯანის საერთაშორისო ბანკი - საქართველო
- Company type: Joint-stock company
- Industry: Consumer and commercial banking
- Founded: Tbilisi, Georgia (February 26, 2007)
- Headquarters: 1 Georgi Leonidze St, Tbilisi 0105, Georgia; 41°41′35″N 44°48′02″E
- Area served: Georgia
- Key people: Emil Abasbayli, General Director; Ali Hakverdiyev, Deputy General Director
- Services: Currency conversion, money transfers, currency exchange, cash deposit, and credit services
- Net income: ▲199.3% 2012-2013; GELლ 4.3 million (2012); GELლ 1.05 million (2011)
- Total assets: ▲56.7% 2012-2013; GELლ144.9 million (2013); GELლ92 million (2012)
- Total equity: GELლ22.7 million (2012)
- Parent: International Bank of Azerbaijan
- Website: ibaz.ge

The International Bank of Azerbaijan-Georgia ("IBA-Georgia" for short) is a subsidiary bank of the International Bank of Azerbaijan located in Tbilisi, Georgia, founded in 2007. It is one of three Azerbaijani banks operating in Georgia. The bank is a member of the Association of Banks of Georgia.

== History ==
According to the United States - Azerbaijan Chamber of Commerce, the bank was founded with 100 percent foreign capital. Initially, $7 million in authorized shares were issued upon the bank's founding. The bank was founded by the International Bank of Azerbaijan (owns 75%), the Azerbaijan Industrial Bank (12.5%), and a private individual (12.5%).

- 2010: IBA-Georgia began to issue VISA International bank cards.
- 2011: The bank became a member of the Banking Association for Central and Eastern Europe (known as BACEE).

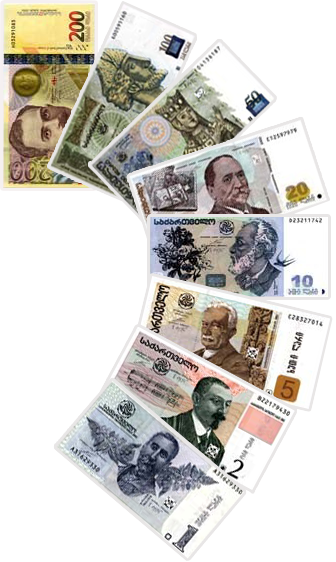
Georgian lari banknotes.

- 2012: The bank reached an annual growth rate of 71.3 percent. The bank's loan portfolio grew from GEL 57.1 million to GEL 97.7 million between 2011 and 2012. By 2012, the bank had 1,462 corporate and individual customers.
- 2014: IBA-Georgia increased its net profit by 13 percent over the previous year.

== People ==
The bank's leadership consists of executive management, the Supervisory Council, and the Board of Directors:

Name	Position	Group
Ulvi Mansurov	Chairman of the Supervisory Council	Supervisory Council
Yasin Jalilov	Member of the Supervisory Council	Supervisory Council
Emil Abasbayli	General Director	Board of Directors
Tamar Gogolashvili	Member of the Board	Board of Directors
Shalva Goduadze	Chief financial officer	Executive Management

== See also ==
- Georgia (country)
- International Bank of Azerbaijan
- International banking
- List of banks in Georgia (country)
