= Azer-Turk Bank =

Azerbaijani state-owned bank

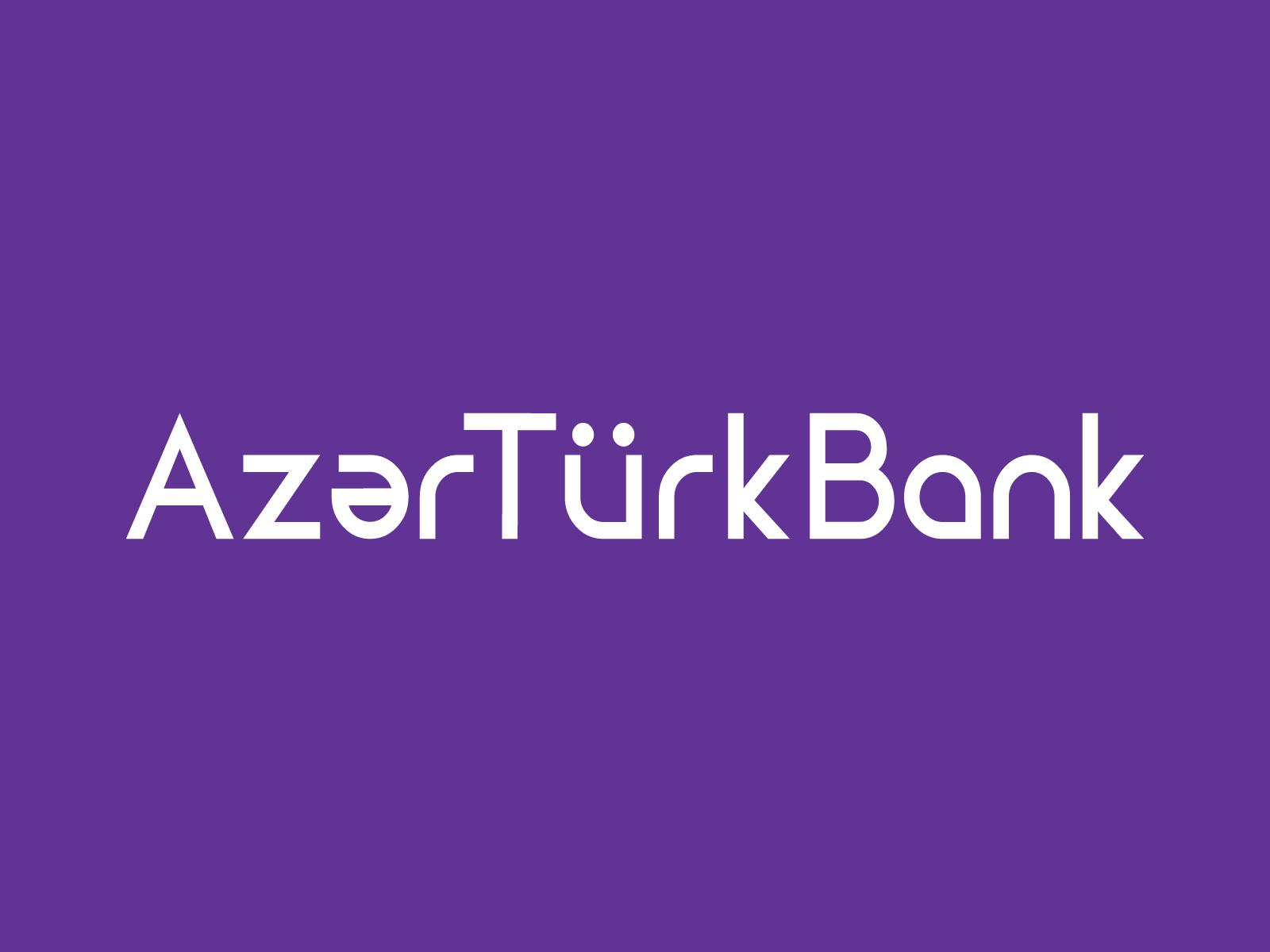
- Type: Open Joint-Stock Company
- Industry: Banking
- Founded: May 25, 1995
- Headquarters: Baku, Azerbaijan
- Number of locations: 8 branches
- Area served: Azerbaijan
- Key people: Gunel Nabiyeva (Chairman of the Executive Board)
- Owner: State Committee on Property Issues (75%)
- Number of employees: 500
- Website: atb.az

Azer-Turk Bank is an Azerbaijani state-owned bank that provides retail and commercial banking services. It is an open joint stock company established on May 25, 1995, based on a license issued by the Central Bank of Azerbaijan. As of 2017[update], the bank's total capital exceeded AZN 50 million (US$29 million).

Based on the bank's license, it can attract deposits, grant credits in its name, and perform transfers and settlement-and-cash transactions on behalf of clients. It can also carry out other activities stipulated by the Bank Law of the Azerbaijani Republic at its own or clients' expense, excluding activities in purchasing and selling precious metals and gems, attraction to deposit, and placement of precious metals.

The Azer-Turk Bank Open Joint-Stock Company maintains correspondence relations with banks of Turkey, the United States, England, Germany, and Russia.

== History ==
The Azer-Turk Bank Open Joint-Stock Company was founded on May 25, 1995, on license number 234 of the Central Bank of Azerbaijan dated June 29, 1995. The Bank started its activities on July 11, 1995.

== Operations ==
The banking license issued by the Central Bank of Azerbaijan grants the Bank the right to attract deposits or other floating assets in national and foreign from physical and legal parties, grant credits in its name and at its own expense, and perform transfers and settlement-and-cash transactions on behalf of clients as a whole.

The Azer-Turk Bank is a member of the Inter-Bank Exchange Market of Baku, the Bank Association of Azerbaijan, the Stock Exchange of Baku, the MilliKart Processing Centre, the SWIFT, and the KОMİS payment systems, as well as the Western Union, Universal Payment Transfer, Contact and Monex international quick money transfer systems, including the international card organization MasterCard International.

== Owners ==
The bank is majority state owned but has the following shareholders:

- Property Issues of Azerbaijan Republic (75.00%)
- Ziraat Bank of the Republic of Turkey (12.37%)
- AzRe Reinsurance OJSC (6.55%)
- Qala Life İnsurance Company OJSC (5.00%)
- Ziraat Bank İnternational AG (1.08%)

== Head office ==
85; 192/193 J.Mammadguluzadeh str., Baku, Azerbaijan
