= Uzum =

Uzbekistani digital ecosystem company

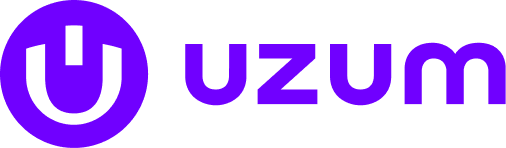
- Type: Private
- Industry: E-commerce; Financial technology; Digital banking
- Founded: 2022; 4 years ago
- Founder: Djasur Djumaev; Nikolay Seleznev; Roman Lavrentyev
- Headquarters: Tashkent, Uzbekistan
- Products: Uzum Market; Uzum Bank; Uzum Nasiya; Uzum Tezkor; Uzum Avto; Uzum Business
- Website: uzum.com

Uzum is an Uzbekistani digital ecosystem company headquartered in Tashkent, integrating e-commerce, fintech, and digital banking services. The name uzum means "grape" in Uzbek, reflecting the company's model of bundling multiple services around a single stem of infrastructure. As of mid-2025, Uzum serves more than 17 million active users per month — over half of Uzbekistan's total population.

== Products and services ==
- Uzum Market — an online marketplace offering a wide range of products with one-day delivery across Uzbekistan. It is the country's largest e-commerce platform by number of users and orders, with a GMV of US$500 million as of 2025.
- Uzum Tezkor — an express delivery service for food and groceries from restaurants and stores.
- Uzum Bank — a neobank offering accounts, peer-to-peer transfers (commission-free), and a co-branded Visa debit card with a pre-approved credit limit, positioned as culturally accessible in a predominantly Muslim market. In 2026, Uzum Bank became Uzbekistan’s second-largest bank by the number of bank cards in circulation.
- Uzum Nasiya — an online unsecured consumer lending and BNPL (buy now, pay later) service, structured as an Islamic finance-compliant instalment product.
- Uzum Avto — an automotive marketplace.

== History ==
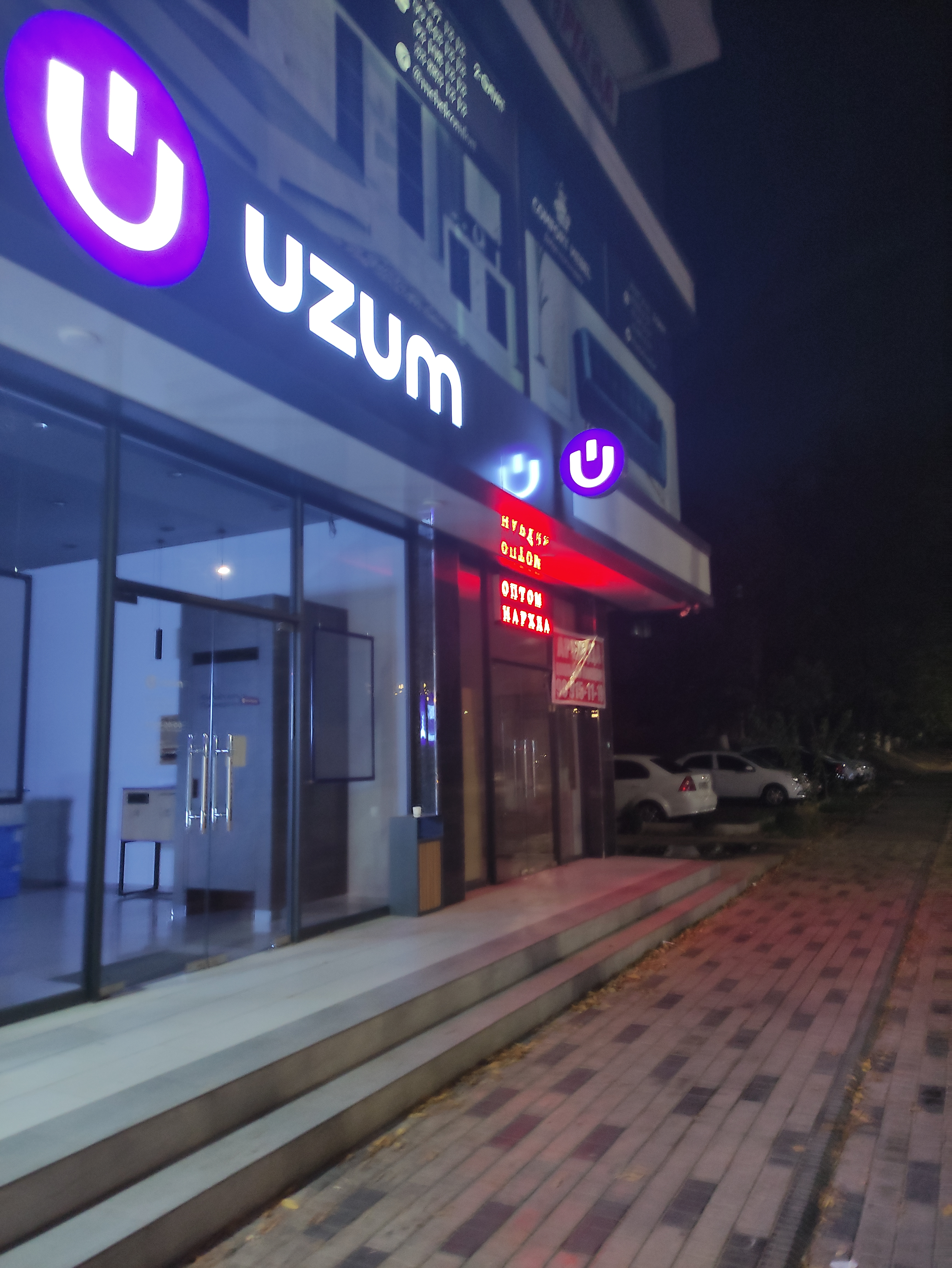
Uzum Market's pickup-point in Tashkent

Uzum was founded in 2022 by Djasur Djumaev (CEO). The company launched its e-commerce marketplace, Uzum Market, in October 2022, having first established its own logistics network, fleet, and pickup-point infrastructure to enable next-day delivery.

Djumaev has described Uzbekistan as uniquely positioned to bypass the traditional offline retail stage entirely, moving directly from bazaar-based commerce to digital commerce.

In March 2024, Uzum raised US$114 million through a combination of a Series A equity round and debt financing, achieving a post-money valuation of over US$1 billion and becoming the first technology unicorn in Uzbekistan. The Series A equity component of US$52 million was led by FinSight Ventures, a global venture capital firm, with participation from Xanara Investment Management, a UAE-based multifamily office, and Uzum's senior management team. By the first half of 2024, the combined monthly active user base of the Uzum ecosystem reached 10.6 million — approximately 30% of Uzbekistan's population — and consolidated net income grew 50% year-on-year. Marketplace GMV grew fourfold year-on-year, the number of orders exceeded 8 million in the half-year period, and more than 10,000 sellers were active on the platform. The company announced plans to raise up to US$300 million in a Series B round to fund further expansion of its BNPL products, online lending, and e-commerce vertical.

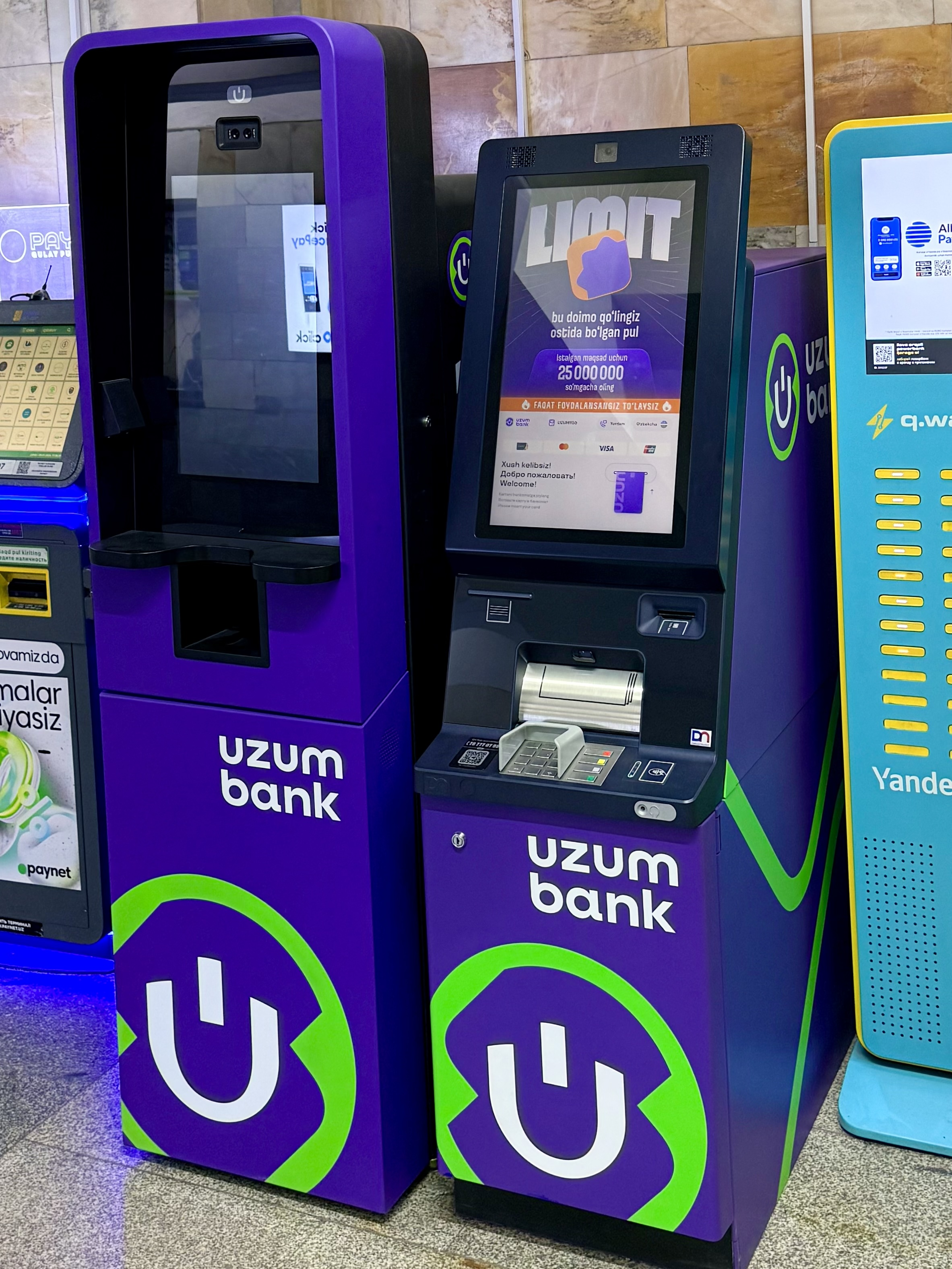
ATM and card issuing machine

In August 2025, Uzum secured nearly US$70 million in equity financing led by Tencent and VR Capital, with participation from FinSight Ventures, raising the company's post-money valuation to approximately US$1.5 billion. By the first half of 2025, GMV reached US$250 million, representing year-on-year growth of approximately 150%. The company reported full-year 2025 revenue of US$691 million (up from US$505 million in 2024) and net income of US$176 million.

In October 2025, Nikolay Seleznev, co-founder and Chief Strategy and Business Development officer Uzum, announced that Uzum had added the London Stock Exchange to its list of candidate venues for a planned 2027 IPO, alongside Nasdaq, Abu Dhabi, and Hong Kong.

In March 2026, Uzum closed a strategic investment exceeding US$130 million anchored by sovereign entities of the Sultanate of Oman, establishing a pre-money valuation of US$2.3 billion — a 53% increase over the August 2025 round in approximately seven months. Existing shareholders VR Capital, Tencent, and FinSight Ventures also participated. The round combined primary equity and structured capital, with conversion terms linked to the company's next qualified financing round (Series B).

== Corporate information ==
Uzum is headquartered in Tashkent, Uzbekistan. Its holding structure includes registration with the Abu Dhabi Global Market (ADGM) in Abu Dhabi, UAE.

=== Investors ===
Round	Date	Amount	Lead Investors	Valuation
Series A + debt	March 2024	US$114 million	FinSight Ventures, Xanara Investment Management	US$1.16 billion
Equity round	August 2025	~US$70 million	Tencent, VR Capital	US$1.5 billion
Strategic investment	March 2026	US$130+ million	Sovereign entities of the Sultanate of Oman	US$2.3 billion (pre-money)
