= Central Bank of Azerbaijan =

Monetary Authority of Azerbaijan

Central Bank of the Republic of Azerbaijan Azərbaycan Respublikasının Mərkəzi Bankı
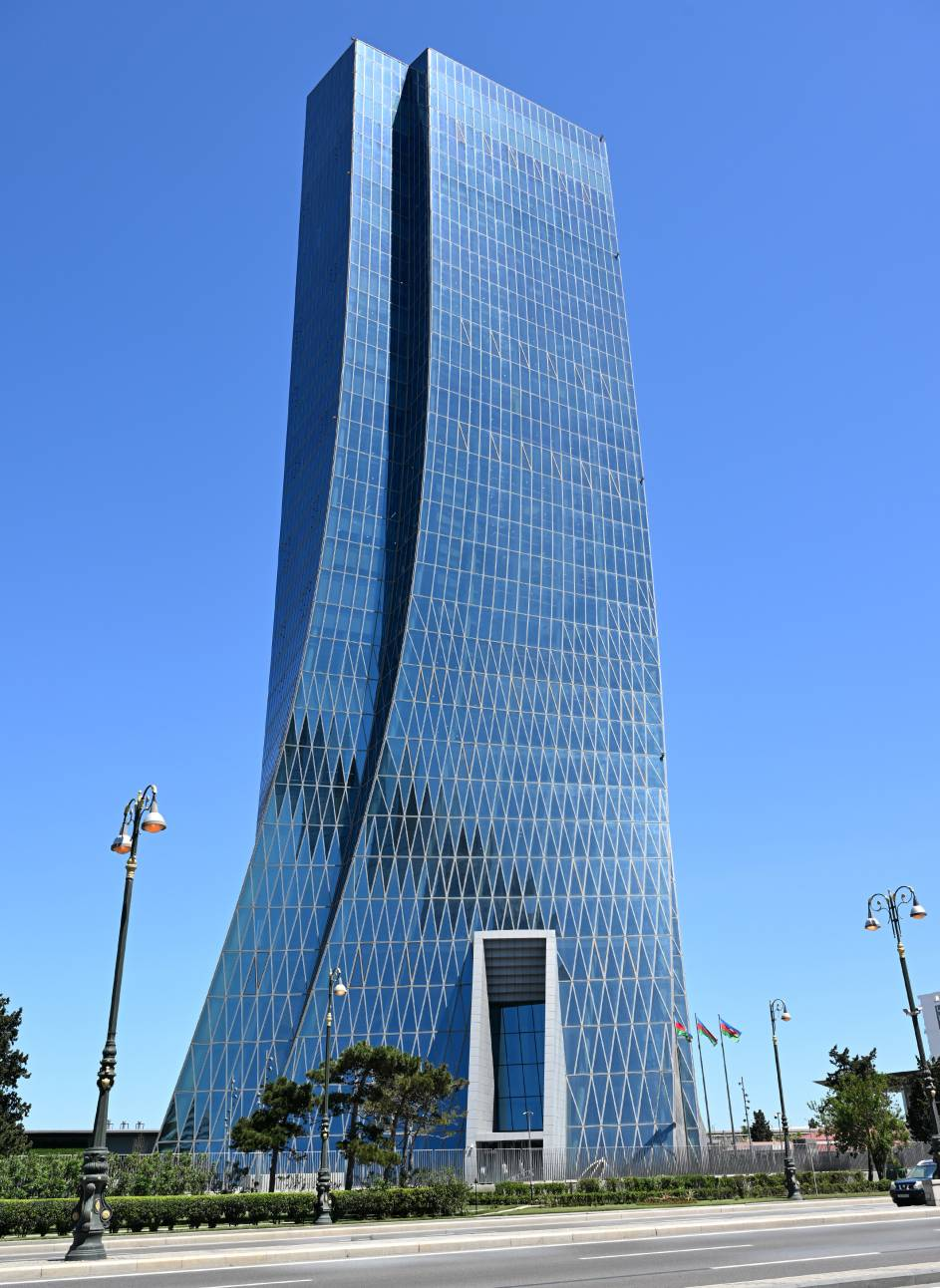
- Central bank of: Azerbaijan
- Headquarters: Baku
- Coordinates: 40°24′56″N 49°54′11″E
- Established: 12 February 1992; 34 years ago
- Ownership: 100% state ownership
- Governor: Taleh Kazimov
- Currency: Azerbaijani manat AZN (ISO 4217)
- Reserves: 15.3 billion USD (as of 07.09.2026)
- Website: www.cbar.az

The Central Bank of the Republic of Azerbaijan (CBA, Azerbaijani: Azərbaycan Respublikasının Mərkəzi Bankı) is the central bank of Azerbaijan, with its headquarters in the capital city Baku.

The National Bank of the Republic of Azerbaijan was established by the Decree of the President of the Republic of Azerbaijan on Establishment of the National Bank of the Republic of Azerbaijan dated 11 February 1992. The National Bank of the Republic of Azerbaijan was renamed the “Central Bank of the Republic of Azerbaijan” upon enactment of the Referendum Act of the Republic of Azerbaijan on “Making additions and amendments to the Constitution of the Republic of Azerbaijan” dated 18 March 2009.

The status, goals, functions and authorities, as well as the management and organizational structure of the Central Bank of the Republic of Azerbaijan, relations with public authorities and other persons as the central bank of the state, are determined by the Law of the Republic of Azerbaijan “On the Central Bank of the Republic of Azerbaijan” dated 10 December 2004. The Central Bank’s exceptional function of issue of the national currency of the country is specified in the Constitution of the Republic of Azerbaijan. The Central Bank is also guided by other legislative acts of the Republic of Azerbaijan and international treaties seconded by the Republic of Azerbaijan.

== History ==
Old building of the Central (then National) Bank of Azerbaijan

The history of central banking in Azerbaijan covers the periods of: the Azerbaijan Democratic Republic (1918–1920); the Soviet socialist era (1920–1991); modern banking history since Azerbaijan regained independence in 1991.

In the early 20th century, Azerbaijan declared its independence and established the Azerbaijan People’s Republic on 28 May 1918. Initially, Transcaucasian bonds were widely used in the independent republic along with Russian money and Baku bonds, issued to circulation by the Baku City Administration and the Municipal service of the Baku Soviet in January 1918 at the decision of the Baku Council of People’s Commissars. At the same time, the Baku branch of the former State Bank of Russia also continued its activity. The Government of the Azerbaijan People's Republic took a decision on the establishment of the Azerbaijan State Bank (central bank) on 7 March 1919. On 16 September of the same year, the Parliament of the Azerbaijan People's Republic adopted the Charter of the Azerbaijan State Bank and the Bank started functioning with the solemn opening ceremony on 30 September 1919.

The ‘bank of banks’, the Azerbaijan State Bank supervised existing credit institutions and issued monetary units.

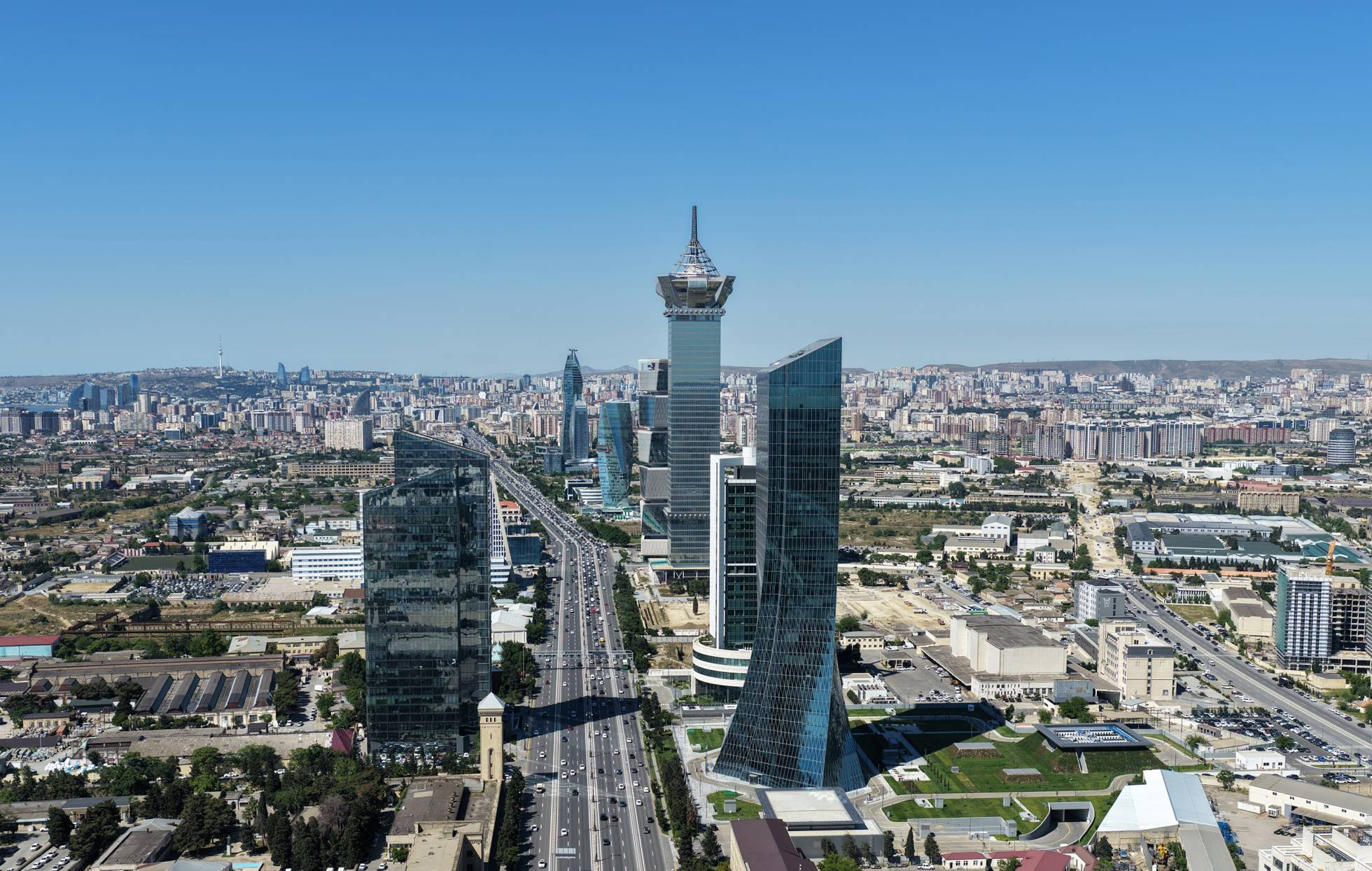
June 2026

After the collapse of the Azerbaijan Democratic Republic on 28 April 1920, the Azerbaijan State Bank was renamed the Azerbaijan People’s Bank at the order of the Finance Commissariat of the new state structure – the Azerbaijan Soviet Socialist Republic on 31 May 1920. At the decision of the Revolutionary Committee of Azerbaijan dated 9 June 1920, all banks and other credit institutions were nationalized and subordinated to the People’s Bank. The banking business was under an exclusive monopoly of the state.

The basic function of the Azerbaijan People’s Bank was to issue banknotes. The People’s Bank, which was a part of Finance Commissariat, financed the national economy and was engaged in budgeting and budgetary forecasting. The People’s Bank halted lending and became an institution serving budget operations along with financial bodies.

A new economic policy at the end of 1921 necessitated the restoration of the central bank. The Azerbaijan State Bank was established by the decision of the Council of People’s Commissars of Azerbaijan dated 16 October 1921 with parallel adoption of its Charter.

The Federative Union of the Transcaucasian Socialist Federative Soviet Republic was established on 12 March 1922. The TSSR was included to the Union of Soviet Socialist Republics (USSR) on 30 December 1922. TSSR moved to a single monetary system at the Decree of the Board of Union of the TSSR of 10 January 1923, which terminated the emission activity of the Azerbaijan State Bank. By the decree of the Council of People’s Commissariat of Azerbaijan dated 3 July 1923, the Azerbaijan State Bank was renamed the Azerbaijan State Agricultural Bank and its central banking functions were terminated. Initially, the Azerbaijan State Agricultural Bank both assisted in the development of agriculture and regulated the money circulation and commodity turnover.

The Baku Branch of the USSR State Bank was established in 1923. Under the Constitution of the USSR, adopted in December 1936, Azerbaijan became a part of the USSR as a ‘sovereign’ republic. The Azerbaijani Office of the USSR State Bank operated from that year to the end of 1991.

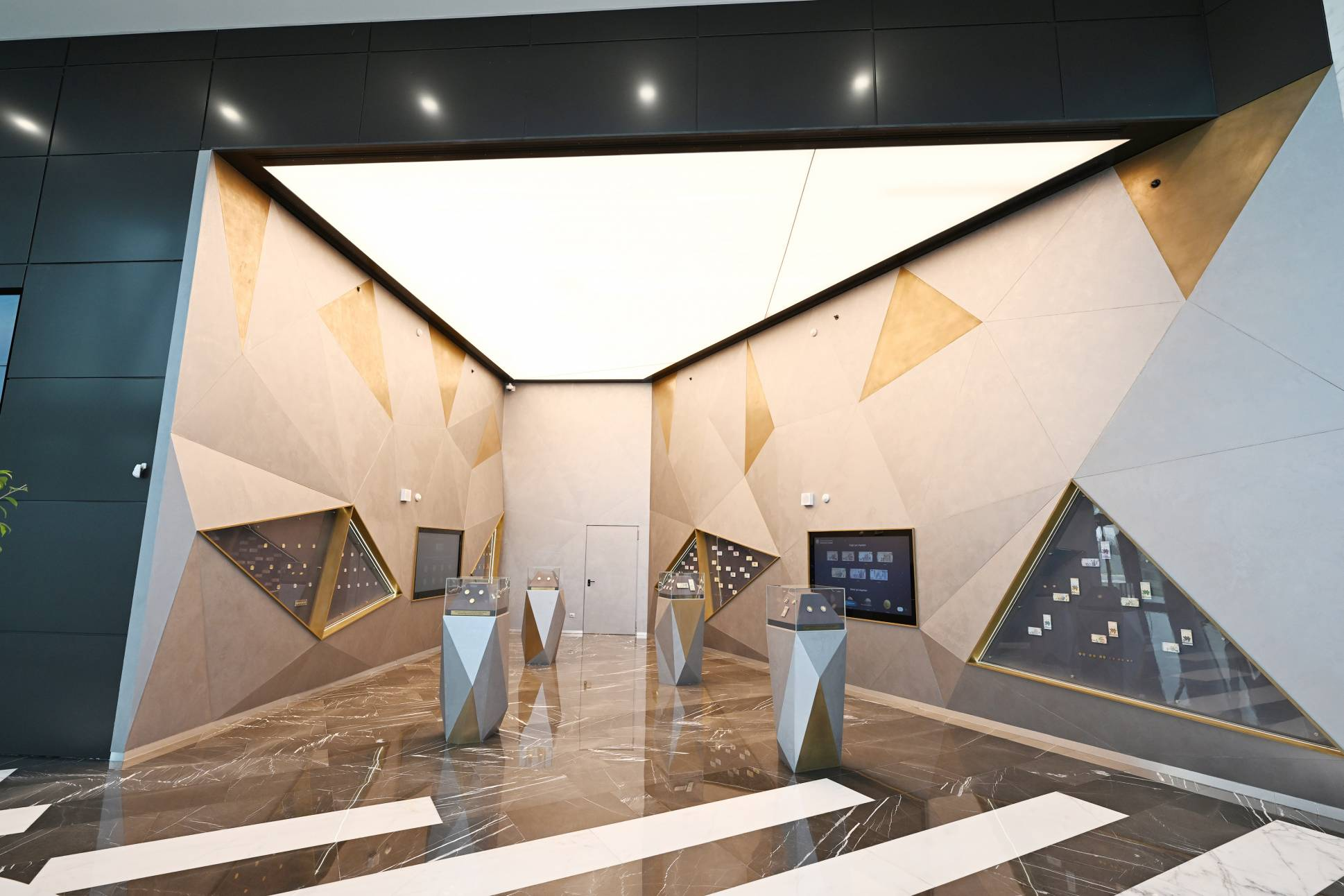
Museum June 2026

Article 14 titled "The Banking system and money circulation" of the Constitutional Law of the Republic of Azerbaijan "On Grounds for Economic Independence of the Republic of Azerbaijan" dated 25 May 1991, stipulated the legal basis for the independent banking system and circulation of the national currency in Azerbaijan, and determined the status and authorities of the National Bank. The National Bank was declared a supreme emission agency, that pursued the state policy in lending, money circulation, settlements and foreign exchange relations, regulating the overall performance of the banking system and discharging reserve bank functions.

A National Bank was established in the Republic of Azerbaijan by Decree of President of the Republic of Azerbaijan on ‘Establishment of the National Bank in the Republic of Azerbaijan’ dated 11 February 1992. The effective date of the Decree (12 February) is celebrated as the day of establishment of the Bank.

The first law regulating activities of the National Bank – the Law on the National Bank of the Republic of Azerbaijan was adopted on 7 August 1992 and the Resolution on Approval of the Charter of the National Bank of the Republic of Azerbaijan was passed by the Milli Mejlis (National Parliament) of the Republic of Azerbaijan on 1 December 1992.

The national currency of the Republic of Azerbaijan – the Azerbaijani manat was issued into circulation on 15 August 1992 and was announced the only legal tender from 1 January 1994 onward. According to Para II, Article 19 of the first Constitution of the independent Republic of Azerbaijan, adopted by the 12 November 1995 referendum, the National Bank enjoys the exceptional right of issue of monetary units into and withdrawal from circulation.

Currently, the Central Bank is guided by the third generation banking laws (second edition of the Law of the Republic of Azerbaijan on the National Bank of the Republic of Azerbaijan was adopted on 14 June 1996, and third edition on 10 December 2004).

According to Decree of President of the Republic of Azerbaijan on Changes to the Nominal Value of Monetary Units and the Scale of Prices (Denomination) in the Republic of Azerbaijan dated 7 February 2005, a new Manat (AZN) was issued into circulation on 1 January 2006 – 1 new Manat was equal to 5,000 old Manats (AZM). AZM remained in parallel circulation with AZN in 2006 and only on 1 January 2007 the country started to use the new Manat.

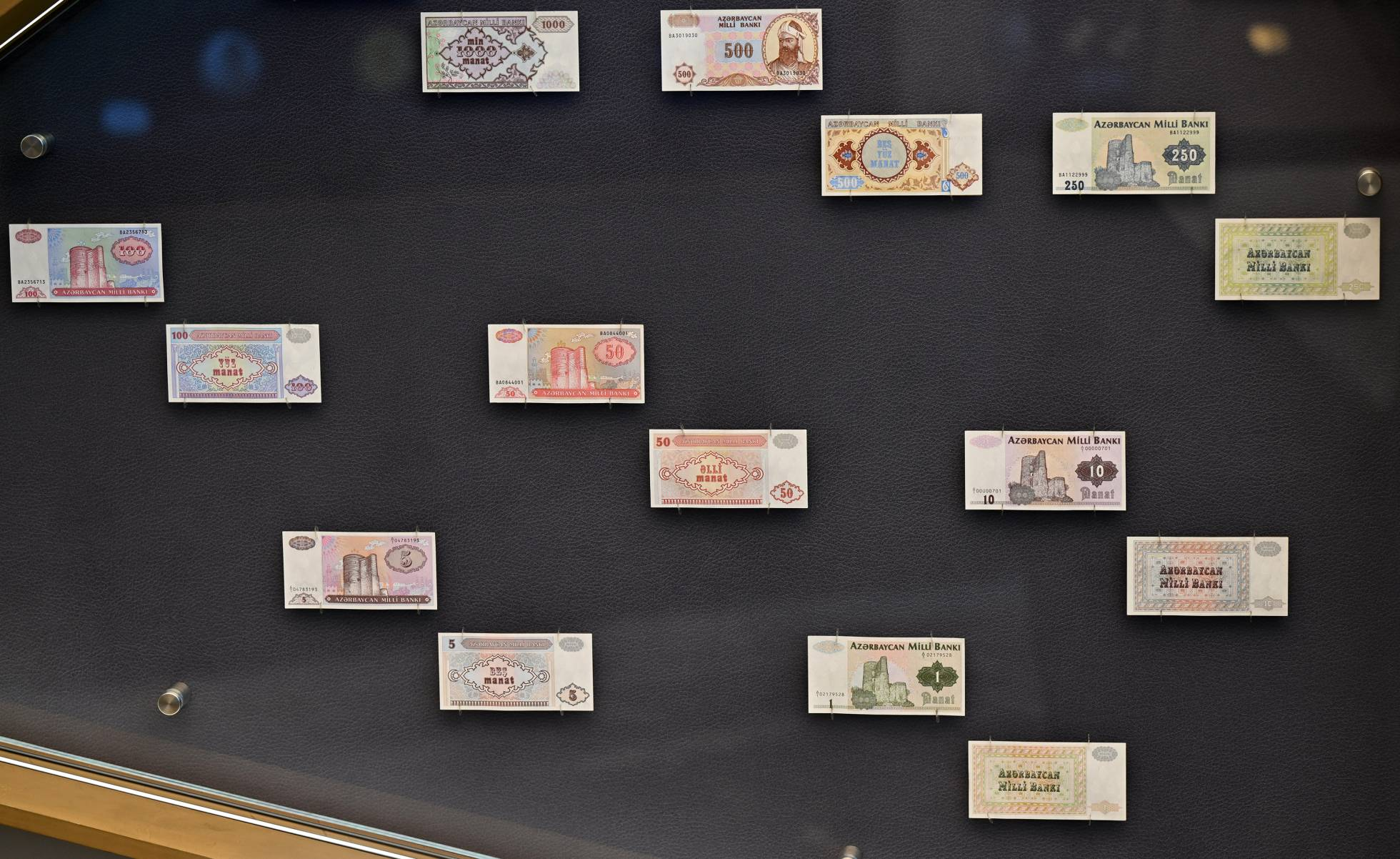
Museum June 2026

Discharge of the country’s central bank functions stipulated review of the bank’s name, and it was renamed ‘the Central Bank of the Republic of Azerbaijan’ with the enforcement of the Referendum Act of the Republic of Azerbaijan on ‘Making Additions and Amendments to the Constitution of the Republic of Azerbaijan’ dated 18 March 2009.

According to the amendments to the Law of the Republic of Azerbaijan “On the Central Bank of the Republic of Azerbaijan” adopted on 4 March 2016, the authority to license, regulate and supervise banks were assigned to a newly established regulating body. Since then, the Central Bank has focused on the monetary and exchange rate policy, safeguarding macroeconomic and financial stability, regulation and development of centralized interbank and other licensed payment systems and organization of cash circulation. According to the order of the president of the Republic of Azerbaijan “On improving management of the regulation and supervision of financial services market” issued on November 28, 2019, the Financial Market Supervisory Authority was liquidated. The authorities of the financial market supervisor stipulated by the applicable law, including rights and responsibilities in the areas of licensing of financial market services, regulation and supervision, protection of rights of investors and consumers of financial services, as well as FIMSA’s property were handed over to the Central Bank of the Republic of Azerbaijan.

== Goals and functions ==
The main goal of the Central Bank is to maintain price stability within its authorities set by the Law of the Republic of Azerbaijan “On the Central Bank of the Republic of Azerbaijan” dated 10 December 2004.

The goals of the Central Bank are also to organize and ensure operations of centralized interbank and other unlicensed payment systems, as well as support the stability of the banking system. Profit-making is not the main goal of the Central Bank.

To achieve its goals, the Central Bank:

- conducts the monetary and foreign exchange policy;
- organizes cash circulation;
- sets an official exchange rate of Manat;
- regulates and controls foreign currency;
- regulates and license bank and insurance sector, supervises activities in bank and insurance sector within the provisions of the existing Law;
- regulates securities market;
- manages gold and foreign exchange reserves;
- develops the balance of payments;
- develops the country’s consolidated (both public and non-public) foreign debt statistics and international investment balance;
- organizes and regulates payment systems.

== Structure and management ==
The Central Bank’s organizational structure includes the management board, the central administrative body and regional offices. The central administrative body includes the internal audit unit, as well as other structural units defined by the management board. All structural units and bodies, including the central administrative body of the Central Bank, function according to statutes approved by the management board.

The Central Bank is governed by the management board.

According to the Constitution of the Republic of Azerbaijan, members of the management board are appointed by the National Parliament of the Republic of Azerbaijan upon presentation by the president of the Republic of Azerbaijan, while the governor and deputy governors of the Central Bank are appointed by the president of the Republic of Azerbaijan from among the management board members.

The chairman of the management board of the Central Bank governs the Bank’s executive structure and chairs the management board, represents the Central Bank, segregates duties and responsibilities among senior management and addresses issues that do not fall under the management board's jurisdiction according to the Law of the Republic of Azerbaijan “On the Central Bank of the Republic of Azerbaijan”.

The Central Bank discharges its functions across the country via its regional offices. There are six regional branch offices of the Central Bank throughout the country: the Nakhchivan Autonomous Republic Office of the Central Bank; Ganja, Bilasuvar and Guba Regional Offices; Yevlakh and Sumgayit Reserve Centers.

=== Governors ===
Name	Took office	Left office	Notes Qalib Ağayev	1992
Cavanşir Abdullayev	1992	1993		
Qalib Ağayev	1993	1994		
Elman Rustamov	January 1995	April 2022		
Taleh Kazimov	April 2022	Incumbent		

== See also ==
- Economy of Azerbaijan
- Azerbaijan manat
- Banking in Azerbaijan
- List of banks in Azerbaijan
- List of central banks
- List of financial supervisory authorities by country
