= Banking in Azerbaijan =

Banking in Azerbaijan in its present form dates back to 1992, but it originated in the second half of the 19th century and continued through the Soviet period. It consists of the country's central bank, the Central Bank of Azerbaijan, founded on 11 February 1992, and other commercial banks. The commercial banks in the country are joint–stock companies.

The only valid currency in Azerbaijan is the Azerbaijani manat. Only the Central Bank can issue manats. During the transition to a market economy in the 1990s, the banking system was not meeting the needs of socioeconomic development as expected, and followed old, Soviet laws. Banks in Azerbaijan have mandatory reserves, determination of norms, regulations of liabilities between creditors and depositors, and deposit insurance. These laws were introduced in 1996 after the system proved to violate laws and timely repayments of deposits. The country's banking system is now stable.

== Legal basis ==
Azerbaijan restored its independence on October 18, 1991. Besides the law "On Banks and Banking Activity in the Republic of Azerbaijan,” the law “On the National Bank of the Republic of Azerbaijan” was adopted on 7 August 1992. Manat—the national currency of the Republic of Azerbaijan—was released on August 15 (together with the ruble). Manat was declared the only means of payment in the country on 1 January 1994. In Article 19, paragraph 2 of the first Constitution of the Republic of Azerbaijan adopted in the referendum on November 12, 1995, it was reaffirmed that the right to issue and withdraw money from circulation only belongs to the National Bank. The laws "On the National Bank of the Republic of Azerbaijan” and "On Banks and Banking Activity in the Republic of Azerbaijan" were re-adopted in a new edition on dates 10 June 1996, and 14 June 1996, respectively. New bank laws allowed the banking system to become closer to the world banking experience and establish credit institutions. In order to adapt to the updated scientific and theoretical methods and the requirements of modern ongoing processes, the law "On the National Bank of the Republic of Azerbaijan" was adopted on December 10, 2004. The law “On Banks” adopted on 16 January 2004, came into force on 30 March 2004. In connection with the Referendum Act named “On Additions and Amendments to the Constitution of the Republic of Azerbaijan" dated March 18, 2009, "National Bank of the Republic of Azerbaijan" was renamed to "The Central Bank of the Republic of Azerbaijan". As a result of measures taken for the creation of deposit insurance mechanisms, the law "On Deposit Insurance" was adopted On 29 December 2006. Important activities are carried out in Azerbaijan to prevent legalizing criminally obtained money or other properties and the financing of terrorism. In this regard, the law “On the Prevention of the Legalization of Criminally Obtained Funds or Other Property and the Financing of Terrorism” came into force on the date 25 February 2009.

== Ratings ==
On 6 March 2014, Fitch Ratings released an assessment of Azerbaijan's banking sector as being “broadly stable," although it highlighted structural issues that should be addressed to improve the sector. Fitch noted that retail lending is a higher growth segment than corporate lending. Fitch also affirmed positive ratings on five different Azerbaijan banks.

== See also ==
- List of banks in Azerbaijan
