= List of airlines of Azerbaijan =

This is a list of airlines of Azerbaijan which have an Air Operator Certificate issued by the Civil Aviation Authority.

== Active airlines ==
Airline	IATA	ICAO	Image	Callsign	Commenced operations	Hub airport(s)	Notes
Azerbaijan Airlines	J2	AHY		AZAL	2006	Heydar Aliyev International Airport	Flag carrier

== Air Charter ==
Airline	IATA	ICAO	Image	Callsign	Commenced operations	Hub airport(s)	Notes
ASG Business Aviation ASG Helicopter Services		ESW		W-BUSINESS	2007	Heydar Aliyev International Airport	Previously SW Business Aviation Ceased airline-type operations

== Air Freight ==
Airline	IATA	ICAO	Image	Callsign	Commenced operations	Hub airport(s)	Notes
Silk Way Airlines	ZP	AZQ		SILK LINE	2019	Heydar Aliyev International Airport	Established out of Silk Way assets
Silk Way West Airlines	7L	AZG		SILK WEST	2012	Heydar Aliyev International Airport	Established out of Silk Way assets

== Former Airlines ==
This is a list of defunct airlines of Azerbaijan.

Airline	Image	IATA	ICAO	Callsign	Commenced operations	Ceased operations	Notes
Buta Airways			AHY	AZAL	2016	2023	Previously AZALJet Merged into Azerbaijan Airlines of which was a subsidiary
Imair Airlines		IK	ITX	IMPROTEX	1995	2009	
Turan Air		3T	URN	TURAN	1995	2013	

== See also ==
- List of airports in Azerbaijan
- List of airlines
- List of defunct airlines of Europe
