= Sevinj Stories =

2022 miniseries about the Khojaly massacre

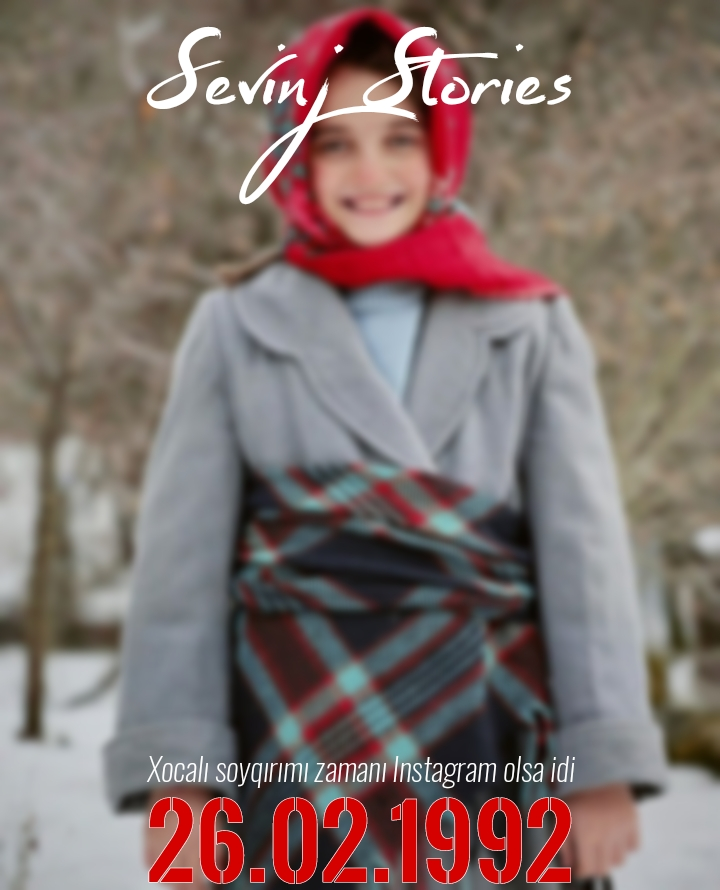
- Fanmade poster
- Genre: Historical drama
- Created by: Alikhan Rajabov
- Inspired by: Khojaly massacre
- Written by: Alikhan Rajabov
- Directed by: Vusal Ahmadzade
- Country of origin: Azerbaijan

Original release
- Release: 2 February 2022

Sevinj Stories, Azerbaijan historical drama mini-series about the Khojaly massacre.

The Sevinj stories project was initiated by vice-president of the Heydar Aliyev Foundation Leyla Aliyeva with the support of the Youth Foundation of the Republic of Azerbaijan within the framework of the Khojaly Justice International Awareness Campaign.

== Synopsis ==
The main theme of the mini-series is the experiences of 9-year-old "Instagram" blogger Sevinj, who lived in Khojaly during the First Nagorno-Karabakh War, in February 1992, on the eve of the Khojaly massacre. Sevinj lives in Khojaly with her grandparents and blogs daily. At that time, Armenian forces attacked the city, and during the shootings, his grandfather Hikmet used phrases such as "Don't be afraid, my daughter it is firework." Although the characters in the series are imaginary, the filming is based on the testimonies of the victims of the Khojaly massacre.

== Cast and characters ==
=== Characters ===
Sevinj, the main character of the mini-series, was played by Nazakat Heydarova. Sevinj's friend Asifi was played by Kenan Ikidag. Mirza Aghabeyli played the role of Sevinc's grandfather.

=== Cast ===
The project was implemented by 8 people. The head of the project was Alikhan Rajabov, director Vusal Ahmadzade, screenwriters Alikhan Rajabov, Togrul Eminli and Vusal Ahmadzade, artist Elturan Mammadov, cameraman and editor Natig Husiyev, sound operator and technician Farid Ismayilzade, producer and coordinator Ibrahim Heydarov and makeup artist Sevda Zeynalova. The filming of the mini-series took place in the village of Vendam, Gabala region, usually on weekends or holidays.

=== Broadcasting ===
A trailer was shared before the mini-series was released. After that, the series of the project was published on February 1, on the Instagram platform, on the page "sevinj.stories".
