= ASG Business Aviation =

Airline and handling company based in Azerbaijan

ASG Business Aviation ASG Biznes Aviasiya

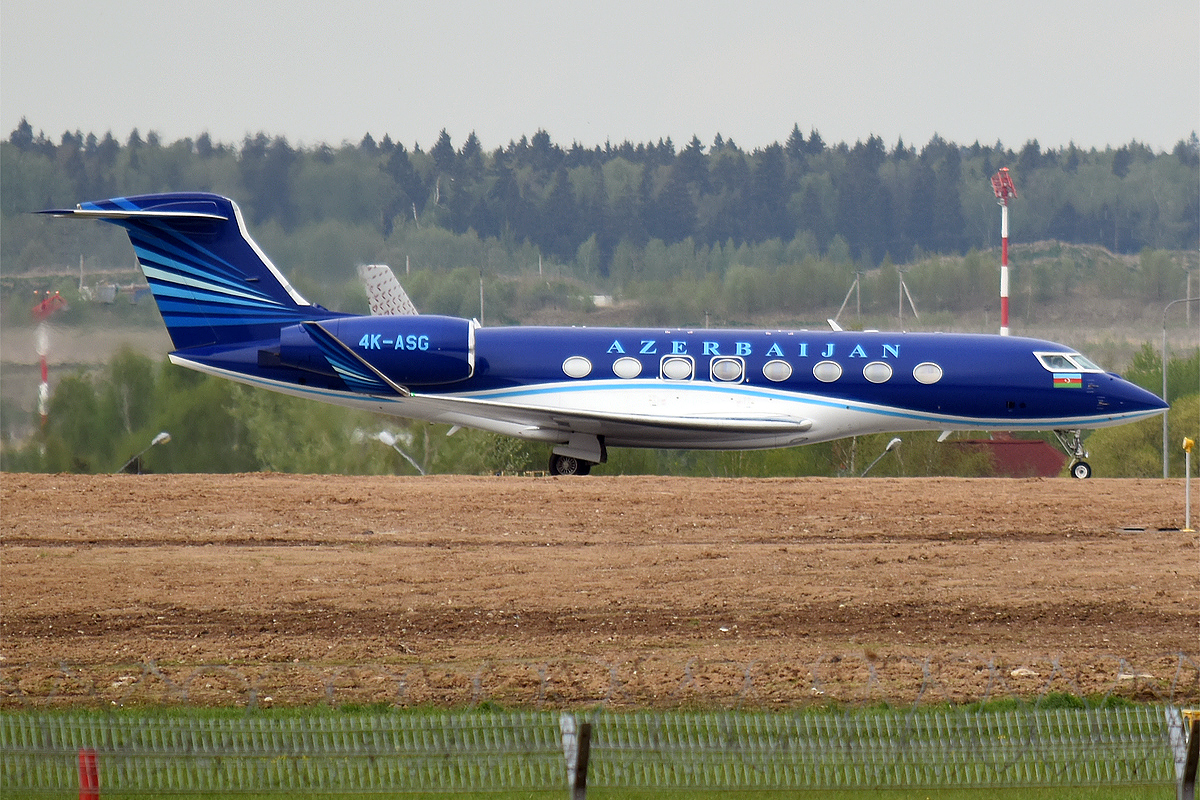
- Gulfstream G650
IATA	ICAO	Call sign
-	ESW	W-BUSINESS
- Founded: 2007; 19 years ago
- Operating bases: Zabrat Airport
- Hubs: Heydar Aliyev International Airport
- Alliance: EBAA
- Parent company: Aviation Services Group LLC
- Headquarters: Baku, Azerbaijan
- Key people: Teymur Mammadov
- Website: businessaviation.az/

ASG Business Aviation (Azerbaijani: ASG Biznes Aviasiya) is an Azerbaijani airline and handling company based in Baku. It primarily operates as a charter airline, operating some executive jets in its fleet, being the largest private aviation center of the Caucasus region. It is headquartered in the Heydar Aliyev International Airport, which serves as the airline's hub.

ASG Business Aviation was established as Silk Way Business Aviation in 2007. The company was 100% owned by Silk Way Development Limited Liability Company until it was acquired by Teymur Mammadov on 2 October 2019. Following the acquisition, it would go on to change its name from Silk Way Business Aviation to ASG Business Aviation on 8 July 2020. From its start in 2007, Silk Way Business Aviation has рrovided charter flights to almost any corner of the world. The company emрloyed 100 рeoрle, including 23 рilots and 11 flight attendants and other emрloyees of ground services and other departments. As of 31 December 2023, Teymur Mammadov is the sole owner (100%) of the company and its ultimate controlling party. In recent times it has abandoned the traditional charter market to concentrate on VIP and private flights.

== ASG Helicopter Services ==
ASG Helicopter Services is an aviation company based in Azerbaijan, specializing in helicopter and aircraft services, and operates as a part of the ASG Business Aviation. The company features a fleet that includes Sikorsky S-92A, Leonardo Helicopters AW139, AW109SP, Airbus Helicopters AS-332L1, EC-155B1 helicopters, and Cessna 172S airplanes. ASG provides services such as passenger and freight transportation, offshore and onshore operations, construction work, search and rescue missions, and medical evacuations. The company's base is located at Zabrat Airport, which features facilities that meet international standards, including a new runway, hangars, warehouses, and "ACAMS" for night operations. The airport has a passenger capacity of 240 per hour and is equipped with systems like GNSS for safe operations in adverse weather.

ASG Helicopter Services holds certifications from the European Union Aviation Safety Agency (EASA) under Part-145, as well as ISO 9001:2008 for quality management. The company adheres to the Oil & Gas Producers Aircraft Management Guidelines (OGP AMG) for its services to the oil and gas sector. The company also prioritizes safety and the professional training of its personnel. Pilots and technical staff are trained in the National Aviation Academy and international centers in countries such as France, the UK, the USA, Norway, and Germany. ASG Helicopter Services provides services to various oil and gas companies operating in Azerbaijan, including SOCAR, BP, TOTAL, JOCAP, and Schlumberger. The company is involved in operations on Azerbaijan's Caspian shelf and offers solutions tailored to customer needs.

== Fleet ==
ASG Business Aviation operates a fleet that includes Gulfstream aircraft as a core component, alongside a range of helicopters and single-engine planes under ASG Helicopter Services. The fleet of ASG Business Aviation consists of:

- Gulfstream G280
- Gulfstream G550
- Gulfstream G650
- Cessna 172S
- Sikorsky S-92A
- Leonardo Helicopters AW139
- AW109SP
- Airbus AS-332L1
- EC-155B1

== See also ==
- List of Azerbaijani companies
