= Civil Aviation Museum of Azerbaijan =

Civil Aviation Museum of Azerbaijan (Azerbaijani: Azərbaycan Mülki Aviasiya Muzeyi) is a civil aviation museum that has been operating under the auspices of the National Aviation Academy of the Republic of Azerbaijan since April 2005.

== History ==
The National Academy of Aviation was established in 1992 as the "National Aviation Center". In 1994, the center was renamed the National Aviation Academy.

In April 2005, the management of CJSC “Azerbaijan Airlines” decided to create a museum of civil aviation of Azerbaijan.

== Legislative framework ==
The Civil Aviation Museum is guided by the Law of the Republic of Azerbaijan “On Museums", "Instructions for the registration and protection of museum valuables and museum collections of the Republic of Azerbaijan" of the Ministry of Culture and Tourism of Azerbaijan and other state documents.

== Structure ==
The museum consists of funds and exposition departments, a complex of 5 educational and laboratory buildings, a pilot training center, the Heydar Aliyev Museum and the Museum of Aviation History, a library, etc.

=== Department of funds ===
The Department of funds of the museum performs the functions of collecting, protecting museum objects, conducting accounting and registration work. The museum's collection includes visual aids, newspaper materials, manuscripts, copies of state documents, samples of fine art, etc. Their total number is more than 10 thousand. These materials were obtained from the National Archive Department of Azerbaijan, the Archive of political documents, the State Archive of Film and Photo Documents, the National Museum of the History of Azerbaijan, the Institute of History of the National Academy of Sciences of Azerbaijan (ANAS), the Azerbaijan State Television and Radio Broadcasting CJSC, the National Library named Mirza Fatali Akhundov, the Embassy of Azerbaijan in Belarus and other sources. In addition, the museum's fund stores documents and personal belongings of family members of pilots.

=== Exposition Department ===
The opening ceremony of the exposition department was held on February 29, 2008. Among the events held in this department, there are lectures, excursions, exhibitions ("Pilots of Azerbaijan in the Great Patriotic War”," Pilots who participated in the Karabakh war”, "The history of our republic in political persons”, "March Days", etc.).

For its special contributions, in 2016, the Civil Aviation Museum was awarded an Honorary Diploma of the Interstate Civil Aviation Committee.
