= Alikhan Rajabov =

- Əlixan Rəcəbov
- Born: August 1, 1991 (age 35); Baku , AzerbaijanSSR
- Citizenship: Azerbaijan
- Education: National Aviation Academy (Azerbaijan)
- Occupation: actor director
- Years active: since 2016

Alikhan Vagif oglu Rajabov (born August 1, 1991, Baku) is an Azerbaijani actor, director, and screenwriter.

== Life and career ==
Rajabov Alikhan Vagif oglu was born on August 1, 1991 in Baku. He studied at the National Aviation Academy and graduated in 2012. In 2009, he first participated in the championship in Astrakhan, Russia, as part of the Neftchi Baku team of the Funny and Inventive. From 2009 to 2013, he participated with his team in many leagues. In 2013, he participated in the 1st league game in Minsk, Belarus, with the Azerbaijani national team. In 2014, he was a resident of the Comedy.AZ project broadcast on ANS TV channel. He started his personal video blog in December 2016. His first video blogs were 1-minute videos about negative images in society. Later, he left this video format and began to make longer vlogs of higher quality and length. After becoming famous for his vlogs, in 2017 he auditioned for the film "Keklikokotu" and played the role of Gafar. Later, he began filming commercials for large companies. In 2018, he starred in the films "Agajdelen", "Winter tale" and "Goodbye Schmidt!". In March 2019, he played the lead role in the television film "The End of Show Business", which was broadcast on İctimai TV.

== Filmography ==
Date	Film	Role
2017	Keklikotu	Gafar
2018	Ağacdelen	Firuz
2018	Winter tale	İlgar
2018	Balta	Voice acting of various characters
2019	Goodbye Schmidt!	Tarlan
2019	The end of show business	Alikhan
2021	Poison bottle	Jemo
2024	Sariyya	Idrak
2025	Maybe	
2025	Headstone	

== Short films ==
Alikhan Rajabov's films for YouTube have high viewership.

Year	Film In Azerbaijani	Views (August 2021)
2017	Qaqanın gündəliyi — 1	2.186.128
2018	Qaqanın Gündəliyi — 2 Qaqanın Gündəliyi — 3	1.173.239 2.206.990
2019	Qaqli 4 — Pasledniy Söhbət	2.946.922
2017	Onun gündəliyi — 1	731.833
2019	Onun gündəliyi — 2	1.262.675
2017	Bakılının gündəliyi — 1	2.092.186
2018	Bakılının gündəliyi — 2: VHS	471.056
2019	Bakılının gündəliyi 3 — Yadigar	2.297.693
2020	Karantinvari boşanma	1.231.865
2020	Olum ya ölüm	1.256.506
2020	Luger	1.273.758
2021	Faberje	1.084.557
2021	Qənimət	457.712
2022	Sonuncu şam yeməyi	1.639.121
2023	Viktoriya	1.734.525
