= Turan Air =

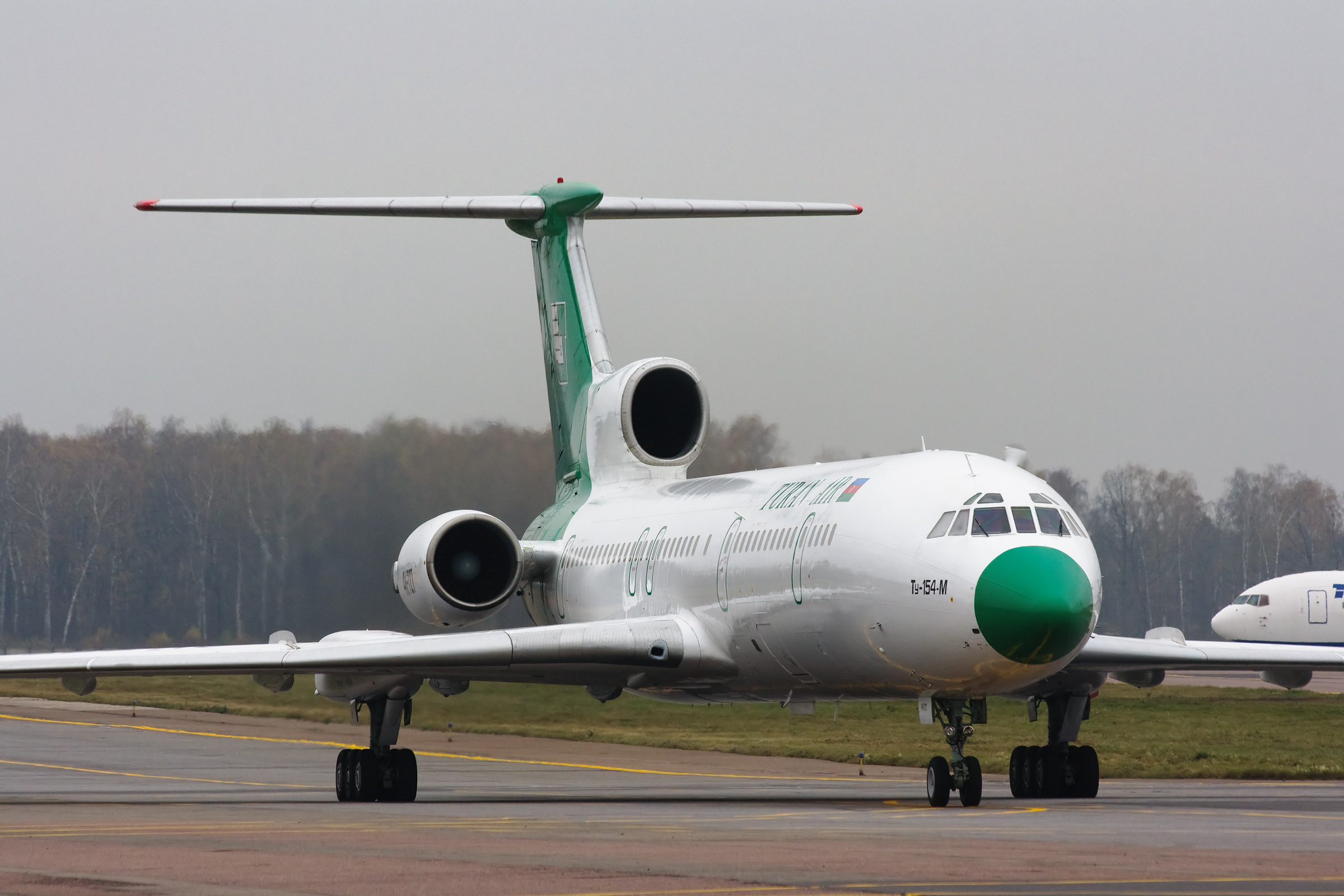
- Tupolev Tu-154M
IATA	ICAO	Call sign
3T	URN	TURAN
- Founded: 1994
- Ceased operations: 2013
- Hubs: Heydar Aliyev International Airport
- Fleet size: 5
- Destinations: 6
- Headquarters: Baku, Azerbaijan
- Website: turan-air.com

Turan Air was an airline based in Baku, Azerbaijan.

== History ==
The company dates its formation to 16 April 1994, with entry into the state register following ten days later, on 26 April. Azerbaijani outlets identify the founding shareholders as the state concern that preceded today's Azerbaijan Airlines (AZAL), together with an American firm, ITI Trading International.

Revenue flights began on 30 June 1995. Alongside routes inside Azerbaijan, the carrier linked Baku with a number of Russian cities.

AZAL gave up its shareholding in January 1997, after which the business returned to the register under a new form, as the joint venture "Turan Air" "Azerbaijan-Ofshor".

Flying activity ended in 2013.

A decade afterwards, in March 2023, the firm gave notice that it was being wound up. Publication fell to Vergilər, the newspaper issued by the State Tax Service of the Ministry of Economy. Anyone owed money was allowed a window of two months to come forward, addressing claims to the company's registered premises at Heydar Aliyev International Airport, in the Binə settlement of Baku's Khazar district. The entity carried taxpayer number 1400394111, held charter capital of 2.47 million manat at that point, and was legally represented by Gülnarə Quliyeva.

== Destinations ==
Turan Air served the following scheduled destinations:

Azerbaijan

- Baku - Heydar Aliyev International Airport
- Lankaran - Lankaran International Airport

Russia

- Yekaterinburg - Koltsovo Airport
- Surgut - Surgut International Airport
- Novosibirsk - Tolmachevo Airport
- Kazan - Kazan International Airport

== Fleet ==
As of February 2013, in its last year of operation, the Turan Air fleet consisted of the following aircraft:

- 5 Tupolev Tu-154M

== See also ==
- List of Azerbaijani companies
