= List of Azerbaijan Airlines destinations =

As of February 2025, Azerbaijan Airlines operates 56 routes, with 57 destinations to 28 countries across multiple continents:

== List ==
Country	City	Airport	Notes	Refs
Afghanistan	Kabul	Kabul International Airport	Terminated	
Austria	Vienna	Vienna International Airport		
Azerbaijan	Baku	Heydar Aliyev International Airport	Hub	
Azerbaijan	Fuzuli	Fuzuli International Airport		
Azerbaijan	Ganja	Ganja International Airport		
Azerbaijan	Lankaran	Lankaran International Airport	Seasonal	
Azerbaijan	Nakhchivan	Nakhchivan International Airport		
Azerbaijan	Qabala	Qabala International Airport	Terminated	
Azerbaijan	Zaqatala	Zaqatala International Airport	Terminated	
Bahrain	Manama	Bahrain International Airport	Seasonal	
Belarus	Minsk	Minsk National Airport		
Belgium	Brussels	Brussels-Zaventem Airport	Begins 8 May 2027	
Bulgaria	Sofia	Vasil Levski Sofia Airport		
China	Beijing	Beijing Capital International Airport		
China	Ürümqi	Ürümqi Diwopu International Airport	Terminated	
China	Xi'an	Xi'an Xianyang International Airport	Terminated	
Croatia	Split	Split Airport	Terminated	
Czech Republic	Prague	Václav Havel Airport Prague		
Egypt	Cairo	Cairo International Airport	Seasonal charter	
Egypt	Sharm El Sheikh	Sharm El Sheikh International Airport		
France	Paris	Charles de Gaulle Airport		
Georgia	Batumi	Alexander Kartveli Batumi International Airport		
Georgia	Tbilisi	Shota Rustaveli Tbilisi International Airport		
Germany	Berlin	Berlin Brandenburg Airport		
Germany	Berlin	Berlin Tegel Airport	Airport closed	
Greece	Athens	Ellinikon International Airport	Airport closed	
Greece	Heraklion	Heraklion International Airport	Seasonal	
India	Ahmedabad	Ahmedabad Airport		
India	Delhi	Indira Gandhi International Airport		
India	Mumbai	Chhatrapati Shivaji Maharaj International Airport		
Iran	Ardabil	Ardabil Airport	Terminated	
Iran	Mashhad	Mashhad Shahid Hasheminejad International Airport	Terminated	
Iran	Tabriz	Tabriz Shahid Madani International Airport		
Iran	Tehran	Tehran Imam Khomeini International Airport		
Iraq	Baghdad	Baghdad International Airport		
Israel	Tel Aviv	Ben Gurion Airport		
Italy	Milan	Milan Malpensa Airport		
Italy	Rome	Rome Fiumicino Airport	Terminated	
Jordan	Amman	Queen Alia International Airport	Terminated	
Kazakhstan	Almaty	Almaty International Airport		
Kazakhstan	Aqtau	Aqtau International Airport		
Kazakhstan	Aqtöbe	Aliya Moldagulova International Airport		
Kazakhstan	Astana	Nursultan Nazarbayev International Airport		
Kazakhstan	Şymkent	Şymkent International Airport		
Kuwait	Kuwait City	Kuwait International Airport		
Kyrgyzstan	Bishkek	Manas International Airport		
Maldives	Malé	Velana International Airport		
Moldova	Chișinău	Chișinău Eugen Doga International Airport		
Montenegro	Tivat	Tivat Airport	Seasonal	
Pakistan	Islamabad	Islamabad International Airport		
Pakistan	Lahore	Allama Iqbal International Airport		
Qatar	Doha	Hamad International Airport		
Romania	Bucharest	Bucharest Henri Coandă International Airport	Terminated	
Russia	Astrakhan	Narimanovo Airport		
Russia	Adler/Sochi	Adler-Sochi International Airport	Terminated	
Russia	Chelyabinsk	Balandino Airport	Terminated	
Russia	Grozny	Kadyrov Grozny International Airport	Terminated	
Russia	Kazan	Ğabdulla Tuqay Kazan International Airport	Terminated	
Russia	Krasnoyarsk	Krasnoyarsk International Airport	Terminated	
Russia	Makhachkala	Uytash Airport	Terminated	
Russia	Moscow	Moscow Domodedovo Airport		
Russia	Moscow	Vnukovo International Airport		
Russia	Nizhny Novgorod	Strigino International Airport	Terminated	
Russia	Mineralnye Vody	Mineralnye Vody Airport	Terminated	
Russia	Novosibirsk	Tolmachevo Airport		
Russia	Orenburg	Orenburg Tsentralny Airport	Terminated	
Russia	Perm	Bolshoye Savino Airport	Terminated	
Russia	Rostov-on-Don	Rostov-on-Don Airport	Airport closed	
Russia	Saint Petersburg	Pulkovo Airport		
Russia	Samara	Kurumoch International Airport	Terminated	
Russia	Ufa	Mustai Karim Ufa International Airport	Terminated	
Russia	Volgograd	Volgograd International Airport	Terminated	
Russia	Voronezh	Voronezh International Airport	Terminated	
Russia	Yekaterinburg	Koltsovo International Airport		
Saudi Arabia	Dammam	King Fahd International Airport		
Saudi Arabia	Gassim	Prince Nayef bin Abdulaziz International Airport	Seasonal	
Saudi Arabia	Hofuf	Al-Ahsa International Airport	Seasonal	
Saudi Arabia	Jeddah	King Abdulaziz International Airport	Seasonal	
Saudi Arabia	Riyadh	King Khalid International Airport		
Spain	Barcelona	Josep Tarradellas Barcelona–El Prat Airport	Seasonal	
Switzerland	Geneva	Geneva Airport		
Syria	Aleppo	Aleppo International Airport	Terminated	
Tajikistan	Dushanbe	Dushanbe International Airport		
Turkey	Adana	Adana Şakirpaşa Airport	Terminated	
Turkey	Ankara	Esenboğa International Airport		
Turkey	Antalya	Antalya Airport	Seasonal	
Turkey	Bodrum	Milas–Bodrum Airport	Seasonal	
Turkey	Dalaman	Dalaman Airport	Seasonal	
Turkey	Istanbul	Atatürk Airport	Airport closed	
Turkey	Istanbul	Istanbul Airport		
Turkey	Istanbul	Istanbul Sabiha Gökçen International Airport		
Turkey	İzmir	Izmir Adnan Menderes Airport	Seasonal	
Turkey	Kars	Kars Harakani Airport	Begins 30 July 2026	
Turkey	Mersin	Çukurova International Airport	Seasonal	
Turkey	Trabzon	Trabzon Airport		
Turkmenistan	Aşgabat	Aşgabat International Airport	Terminated	
Turkmenistan	Türkmenbaşy	Türkmenbaşy International Airport	Terminated	
Ukraine	Kharkiv	Kharkiv International Airport	Terminated	
Ukraine	Kyiv	Boryspil International Airport	Terminated	
Ukraine	Lviv	Lviv Danylo Halytskyi International Airport	Terminated	
Ukraine	Simferopol	Simferopol International Airport	Terminated	
Ukraine	Zaporizhzhia	Zaporizhzhia International Airport	Terminated	
United Arab Emirates	Dubai	Dubai International Airport		
United Kingdom	Aberdeen	Aberdeen Airport	Terminated	
United Kingdom	London	Gatwick Airport		
United Kingdom	London	Heathrow Airport		
United States	New York City	John F. Kennedy International Airport	Terminated	
Uzbekistan	Fergana	Fergana International Airport	Terminated	
Uzbekistan	Samarqand	Samarqand International Airport		
Uzbekistan	Tashkent	Islam Karimov Tashkent International Airport		
Uzbekistan	Urgench	Urgench International Airport		
