= Azerbaijan Airlines =

Flag carrier and largest airline of Azerbaijan

Azerbaijan Airlines Azərbaycan Hava Yolları

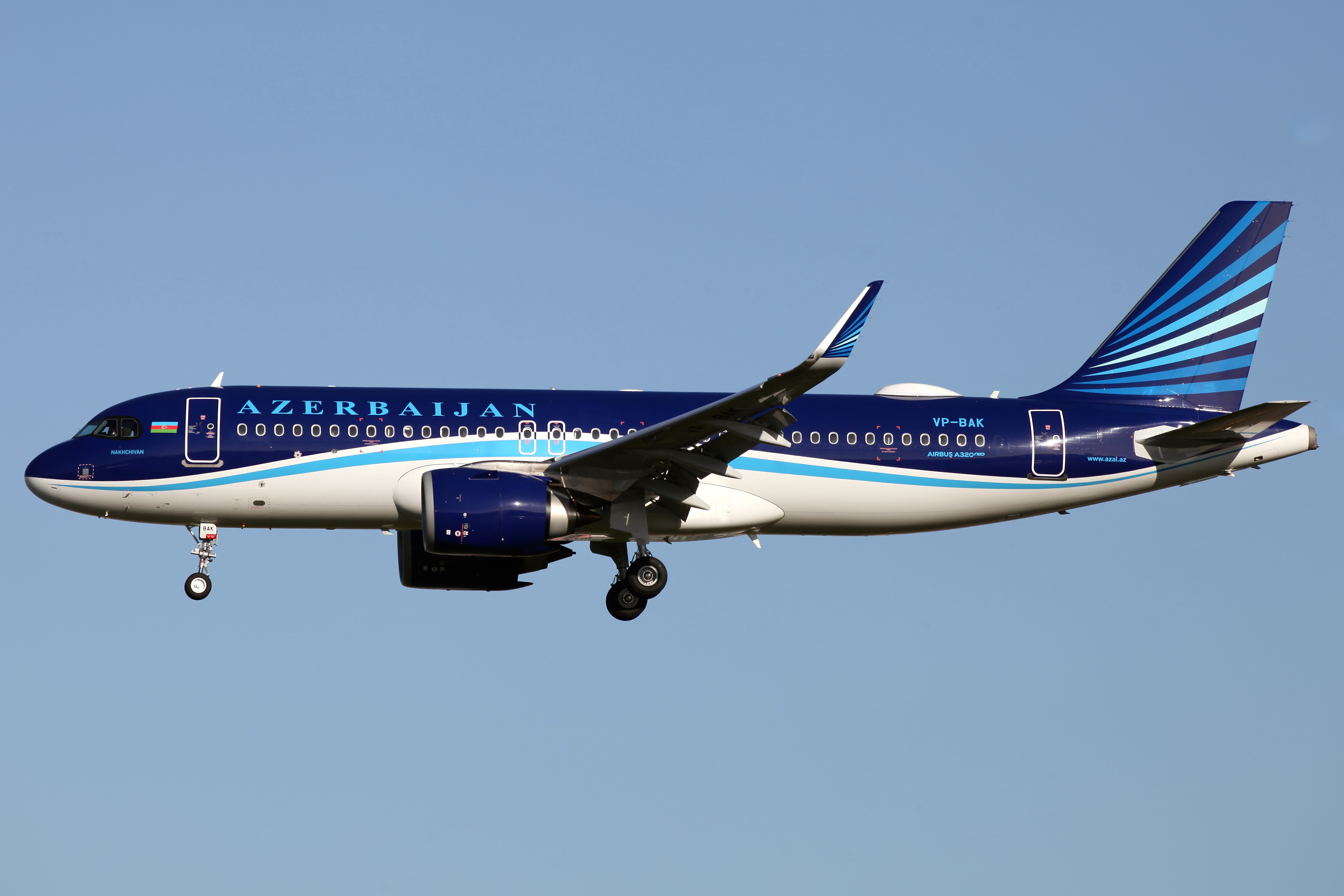
- Azerbaijan Airlines Airbus A320neo
IATA	ICAO	Call sign
J2	AHY	AZAL
- Founded: 7 April 1992; 34 years ago
- Hubs: Heydar Aliyev International Airport
- Frequent-flyer program: AZAL Miles
- Subsidiaries: Airlines: Azal Avia Cargo; Non-airlines: National Aviation Academy
- Fleet size: 49
- Destinations: 57
- Parent company: Government of Azerbaijan via AZCON Holding
- Headquarters: Baku, Azerbaijan
- Key people: Samir Rzayev (president)
- Revenue: ▲AZN 1.149 billion (2022)
- Operating income: ▲AZN 258 million (2022)
- Net income: ▲AZN 110 million (2022)
- Total assets: ▲AZN 2.241 billion (2022)
- Total equity: ▼AZN 772 million (2022)
- Employees: 7,011
- Website: azal.az

Azerbaijan Airlines (Azerbaijani: Azərbaycan Hava Yolları), known in short as AZAL, is the designated flag carrier and largest airline of Azerbaijan. Based in Baku, adjacent to Heydar Aliyev International Airport, the carrier operates to destinations across Asia, the Commonwealth of Independent States (CIS), and Europe.

AZAL was officially founded on 7 April 1992 as the first national airline established after the country gained independence. The state-owned company was privatized in the 2000s, during which ownership of the company's assets ended up in the hands of companies owned by family members of Azerbaijani political elites, including President Ilham Aliyev's daughter Arzu Aliyeva.

== History ==
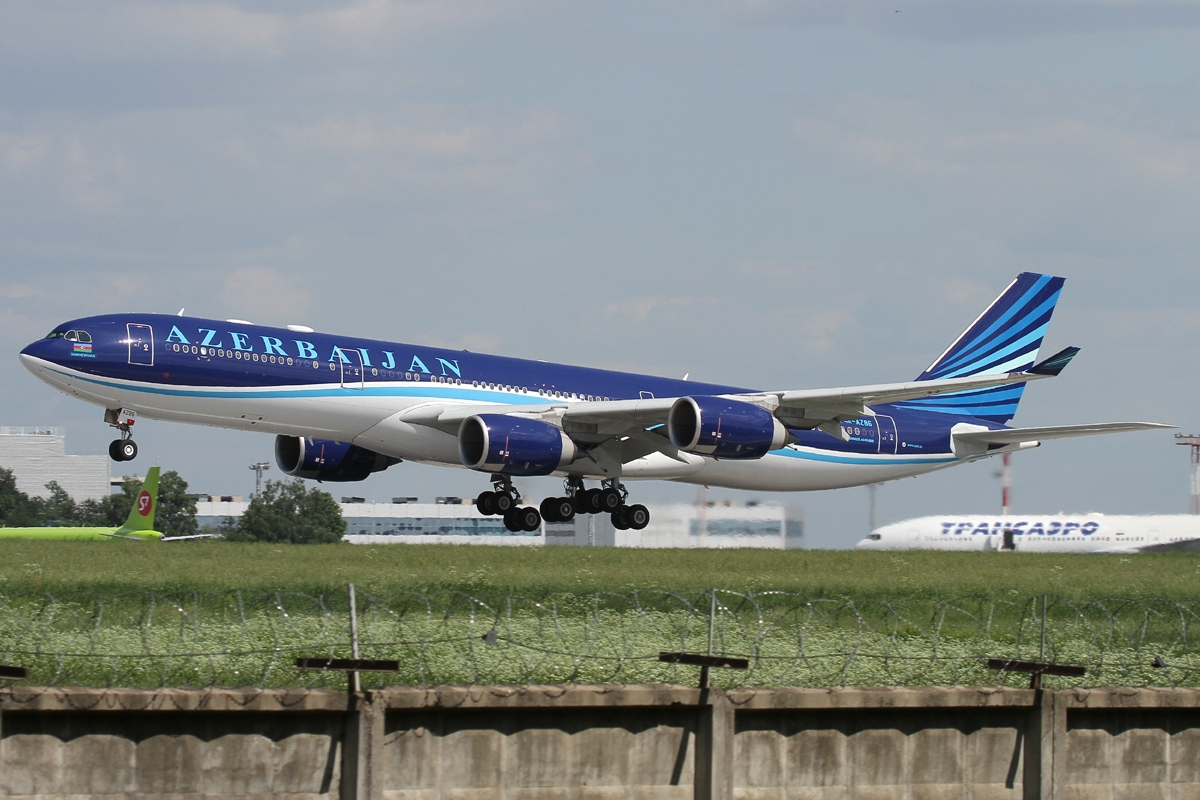
An Airbus A340-542

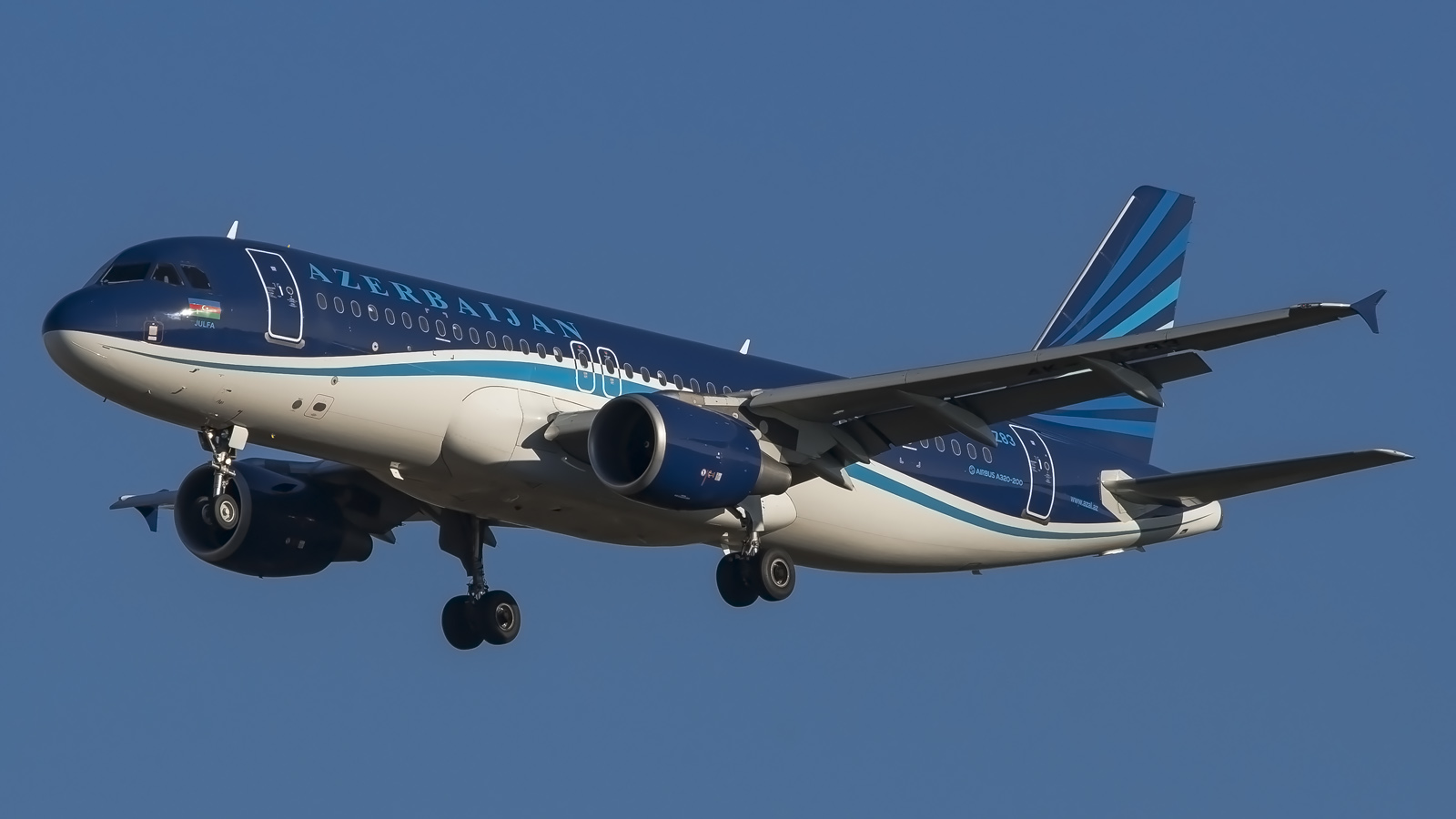
An Airbus A320-200

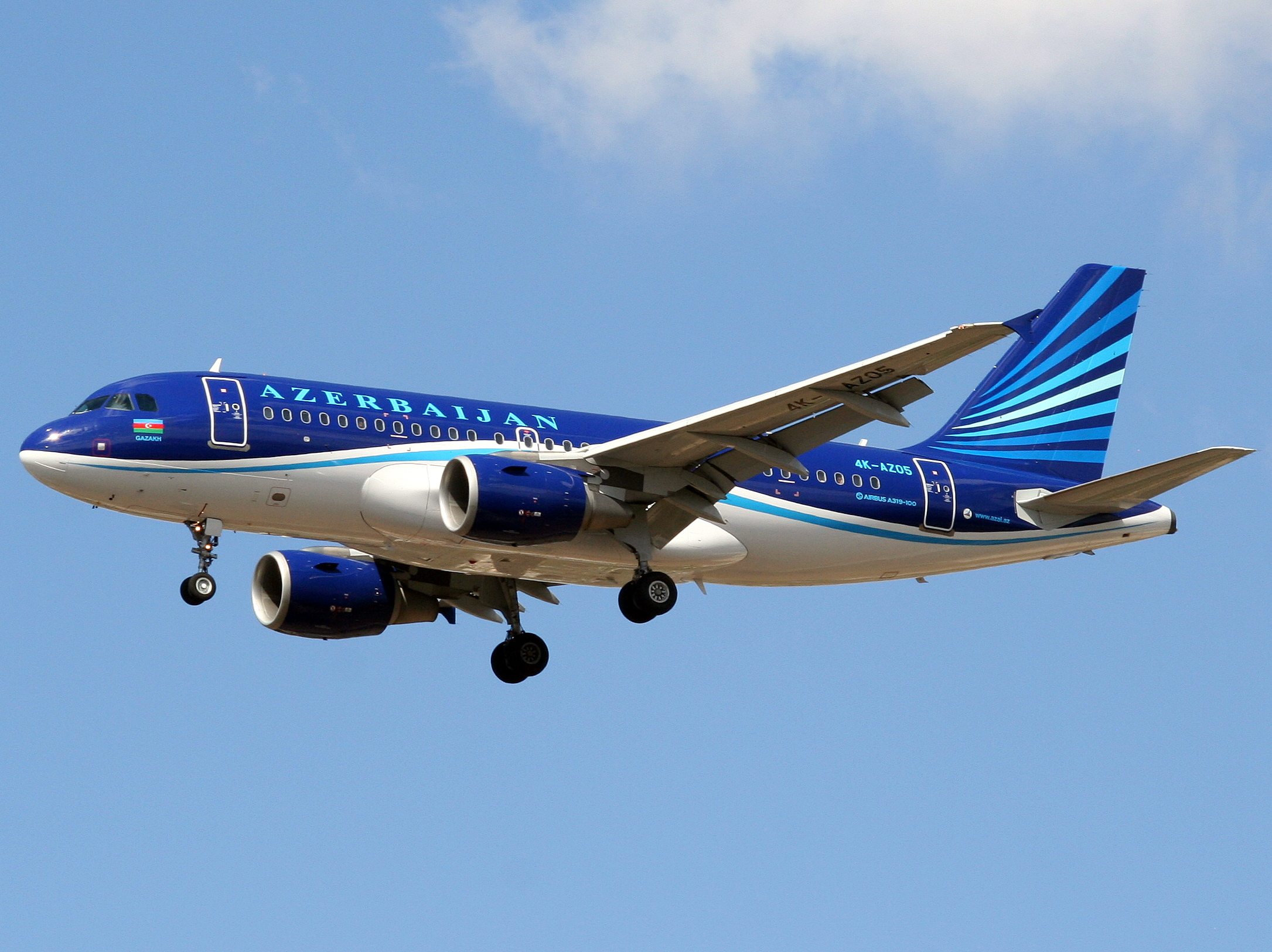
An Airbus A319

=== Foundation and early years ===
The first air squadron in Azerbaijan was formed on 2 June 1938. This date was declared the Azerbaijan Civil Aviation Day under the Decree of the President of the Republic of Azerbaijan in 2006. During the period from 1941 to 1945, Azerbaijan aviation worked under the motto "All for the Front".

In 1990, Azerbaijan announced that it was to set up its own airline, and that it would be independent from Aeroflot, the longtime provider of air services for the Soviet republics. Azerbaijan Airlines (AZAL) was officially established on 17 August 1992, but the first scheduled flights had already begun in the month of April. Its first president was Vagif Sadykhly.

Formed from the regional branch of Aeroflot, Azərbaycan Hava Yolları—Azerbaijan Airlines—soon spread its wings into the world outside the Soviet Union, which had been Aeroflot's exclusive domain. A scheduled Baku-Istanbul route was launched in January 1991 in partnership with Turkish Airlines, and the cargo enterprise Aviasharg was created in cooperation with the United Arab Emirates. AZAL inherited a huge fleet from Aeroflot, including more than 20 Soviet-made Tupolev airliners, some regional airliners and freighters, 90 light aircraft, and 50 helicopters. It was quick to lease a pair of Boeing 727s, however, that once belonged to Pan Am (and were built in 1968). AZAL had an extensive involvement with the Farhad Azim Associated Aviation Leasing Group (ALG), a U.S.-based lessor of Boeing 727s. It had a transatlantic charter cargo joint venture with ALG's Buffalo Airways, which was also training AZAL aircrews to Western standards in Dallas, Texas.

The airline grew rapidly, and by the mid-1990s, a reorganization was necessary. Several operating divisions were created, two of which later became fully-fledged subsidiaries:

— AZAL Agro, tasked with aerial work, essentially spraying agricultural areas. The fleet consisted of the rustic Antonov 2s, with its headquarters and operational base at Yevlakh airfield.

— AZAL Avia Cargo, founded in 1996 and responsible for cargo charter flights, it was activated in December 1997 and subsequently also operated scheduled flights. This company, its operations, and its fleet were subsequently reintegrated into the parent company.

In November 1994, AZAL began a route to Dubai, which, along with Istanbul, was a key source of Western goods. It was soon also flying to Tehran, Tel Aviv, Saint Petersburg, London, and China. Service to several regional destinations was suspended in mid-1998 due to low margins and the need to repair three Yak-40 aircraft. Except for a few major cities, service to neighboring CIS countries was suspended in January 1999 due to debt. These routes were generally unprofitable as well and were facing new competition from trains. According to the Trend News Agency, domestic flights accounted for only about 16 percent of AZAL's traffic in 1998.

Azerbaijan's border dispute with Armenia over Nagorno-Karabakh had delayed financing for two new Boeing 757s from the U.S. Ex-Im Bank. The $66 million loan guarantee was the Ex-Im Bank's first transaction for Azerbaijan, according to Air Transport Intelligence. The financing was also guaranteed by the Azerbaijan government and the International Bank of Azerbaijan. The United Kingdom's Export Credits Guarantee Department guaranteed financing for Rolls-Royce engines, utilized by both Boeing 757s.

=== Development since the 2000s ===
The first of the 757s was delivered in the fall of 2000. The planes offered the carrier unprecedented range, comfort, and efficiency on long-haul international routes. They also helped project a modern image to the world. The second Boeing 757 to be delivered arrived in December laden with medical supplies due to a recent earthquake in Azerbaijan. In January 2001, AZAL used one of the planes to begin operating a Paris-Baku route in collaboration with Air France.

After the September 11 attacks, Azerbaijan, like other nations, experienced a noticeable decline in air travel. AZAL was able to remain profitable through 2001, however, and even make progress toward paying off its debt. The airline was soon shopping for more new aircraft as it retired its aging Soviet models. AZAL ordered its first Western-made helicopters in October 2002, purchasing six for EUR 52 million from Eurocopter. AZAL used helicopters to ferry personnel and equipment out to oil rigs in the Caspian Sea.

The state-owned company was privatized in the 2000s, during which ownership of the company's assets ended up in the hands of companies owned by family members of Azerbaijani political elites, including President Ilham Aliyev's daughter Arzu Aliyeva.

In July 2004, two of AZAL's airliners were impounded by Turkey over a 12-year-old debt owed by Azerbaijan's Agriculture Ministry to a Turkish company. In the same month, AZAL ordered new Ukrainian-made, 52-passenger Antonov An-140 turboprops to replenish its regional fleet, paying about $36 million for four planes.

In April 2006 all scheduled operations were transferred to the newly established Azerbaijan Airlines CJSC, while the “old” AZAL stopped all activities two years later.

On 22 July 2010, Boeing and Azerbaijan Airlines signed an agreement to substitute two Next Generation 737 airplanes for one 767-300ER (extended range) and two 767 Freighters. Including this announcement, Azerbaijan Airlines had a total of eight Boeing airplanes on order: two 767-300ERs, two 767 Freighters, two Next Generation 737s and two 787-8s. In September 2010, AZAL cancelled an order for the remaining two Next Generation 737s.

Azerbaijan Airlines began direct flights between Baku and Beijing on May 10, 2013, launching direct flights to Beijing Capital International Airport and the first ever service to East Asia. The route was flown twice a week using Airbus A340 and Boeing 767 aircraft. The new route provided direct flights between Azerbaijan and China, fostering closer business and tourism exchanges between the two countries. However, at some point in time, their flights were canceled due to increased control from Chinese authorities. The flights between the two countries later resumed. Following Samir Rzayev's meeting with Ding Tao, Chargé d'Affaires of China in Azerbaijan, where they discussed the development of air traffic between Azerbaijan and China and the growing demand, Rzayev and Tao agreed to increase the frequency of flights to Beijing from two times a week to three, and also explored opportunities of adding major cities of Shanghai and Guangzhou to the list of routes of Azerbaijan Airlines. As of April 2025, AZAL operates flights along the Baku-Beijing route three times a week, on Tuesday, Thursday, and Sunday.

On 23 and 24 December 2014, Azerbaijan Airlines took delivery of the two Boeing 787 Dreamliners it had on order. The airline also launched its Premium Economy product along with the introduction of the 787. On 12 November 2017, Boeing agreed to sell five 787-8 aircraft to Azerbaijan Airlines, valued at about $1.9 billion at list prices.

In December 2016, Azerbaijan Airlines announced the creation of a low-cost carrier, AZALJet, to expand its service offerings. However, after one year of operation, it was decided that AZALJet would be replaced by Buta Airways, a new airline that operated Embraer aircraft. Buta Airways featured its livery, was staffed independently, and followed a separate tariff policy. On 16 January 2018, Buta Airways commenced its first European service with a weekly flight to Sofia. Azerbaijan Airlines and Buta Airways would win in the nomination of "Best Regional Airline in Central Asia and CIS" and "Best Low-Cost Airline in Central Asia and CIS" at the Skytrax 2022 World Airline Awards. On 28 July 2023, it was announced that Azerbaijan Airlines and Buta Airways would merge into a single brand, AZAL, with the consolidation set to take place in October of the same year. In 2022 it was announced to retire its Airbus A340-500 and replace it with newer and more efficient Airbus A320neo jets 2 years later. This would mark the Airbus A340-500's last commercial flight.

In June 2024, AZAL was awarded the title of "Best Regional Airline in Central Asia and the CIS" at the Skytrax World Airline Awards 2024 for the second consecutive time. A month later, AZAL started regular flights to Karabakh, marking the first instance of Azerbaijani commercial travel to the region since the end of hostilities. The airline began operating scheduled flights between Baku and Fuzuli city, providing direct access to Karabakh and connecting Heydar Aliyev International Airport to Fuzuli International Airport.

Azerbaijan Airlines is set to launch direct flights between Heydar Aliyev International Airport, and Incheon International Airport which serves the Seoul Metropolitan Area in South Korea from May to July 2025, as reported by the State Tourism Agency of the Republic of Azerbaijan. These flights will be operated once a week, on Fridays, and will continue until mid July 2025. The announcement was made during a tourism event in Seoul, organized by the Azerbaijan Tourism Board, aimed at promoting Azerbaijan's tourism potential. The event was attended by representatives from South Korea's tourism industry, media, influencers, and leading Azerbaijani tourism companies. During the event, Azerbaijan's Ambassador to South Korea, Ramin Hasanov, emphasized that the introduction of direct flights would contribute to strengthening bilateral relations and boosting tourism exchanges between the two nations.

== Corporate affairs ==
=== Supervisory board ===
The supervisory board oversees the strategic direction and governance of AZAL. As of March 30, 2021, the composition of the board was approved by President Ilham Aliyev, with Rashad Nabiyev, the Minister of Transport, Communications, and High Technologies of the Republic of Azerbaijan, serving as the chairman. Members of the board include Khalid Ahadov, assistant to the President of the Republic of Azerbaijan; Elnur Aliyev, Deputy Minister of Economy of the Republic of Azerbaijan, Rahman Hummatov, Deputy Minister of Digital Development and Transport of the Republic of Azerbaijan; Ruslan Alikhanov, executive director of Azerbaijan Investment Holding, Anar Novruzov, Deputy CEO of Azerbaijan Investment Holding; and Fikrat Shirinov, who is the Head of the Tax Policy and Revenue Department of the Office of the Ministry of Finance of the Republic of Azerbaijan.

=== Offices ===
Azerbaijan Airlines features sales and office and representation offices across the world, of which a large portion are located in Azerbaijan. Sales offices in Azerbaijan are located in the cities of Baku, Ganja, and Nakhchivan, while office and representation offices are located in Baku, Ganja, Lankaran, Sumgait, and Nakhchivan. Sales offices are found throughout Eurasia, as well as the United States. In Russia, they are in the cities of Kazan, Mineralnye Vody, Yekaterinburg, Krasnoyarsk, Moscow, Novosibirsk, Astrakhan, Saint Petersburg, Perm and Nizhny Novgorod. There are also offices in China, Belarus, Belgium, Iran, France, Netherlands, Georgia, Italy, Germany, Czech Republic, Kazakhstan, Israel, Ukraine, India, Japan, Malaysia, South Korea with its office in the capital city of Seoul at Gimpo International Airport, Spain, Sweden, Turkey, United Arab Emirates, United Kingdom, Uzbekistan, United States, and Pakistan. Office and representation offices are found in all earlier listed countries and Austria, except for Belgium, Netherlands, India, Japan, South Korea, Spain, Sweden, Malaysia, Uzbekistan, and Pakistan.

=== Subdivisions ===
Azerbaijan Airlines operates through several subdivisions, each responsible for key aspects of the airline and aviation sector in Azerbaijan. The General Aviation Security Administration is responsible for the safety of general aviation flights. National Air Carrier Azerbaijan Airlines is the primary division operating on behalf of the airline flights. The National Aviation Academy offers training in various fields of aviation, including flight training, airport management, and aircraft maintenance. The Azeraeronavigation (AZANS) Air Traffic Control Department, established in 1996, is tasked with controlling air traffic in the airspace of Azerbaijan, guiding aircraft during takeoff, landing, and en route while traveling through the airspace to ensure safe flight operations. Lastly, the AZALOIL Fuels and Lubricants Administration is tasked with providing and administering aviation lubricants and fuels.

== Destinations ==
=== Codeshare agreements ===
Azerbaijan Airlines codeshares with the following airlines:

- Air Astana
- airBaltic
- Air France
- Air India
- Air Serbia
- Austrian Airlines
- Belavia
- Bulgaria Air
- El Al
- Etihad Airways
- Gulf Air
- Lufthansa
- Pakistan International Airlines
- Qatar Airways
- S7 Airlines
- SCAT Airlines
- Turkish Airlines
- Uzbekistan Airways

=== Interline agreements ===
Azerbaijan Airlines has interline agreements with the following airlines:

- Air China
- Delta Air Lines
- Emirates
- Ethiopian Airlines
- Hainan Airlines
- KLM
- LOT Polish Airlines
- Saudia
- SCAT Airlines
- Singapore Airlines
- SunExpress

== Services ==
=== Cabins ===
Azerbaijan Airlines features three travel classes – Economy Class, Premium Economy Class, and Business Class. AZAL also offers a Class Upgrade service, available exclusively at their sales offices and official agencies. Economy Class passengers can enhance their travel experience by upgrading to Business Class or Premium Economy. Additionally, premium economy passengers can upgrade to business class. By choosing the Class Upgrade service, travelers also gain access to the AZAL Lounge at Heydar Aliyev International Airport. Passengers can upgrade their class of service after purchasing a ticket by contacting Customer Care at least 24 hours before the scheduled flight departure. Upgrades can also be requested during check-in at the airport or on board the aircraft before departure by consulting with the cabin crew.

==== Economy Class ====
Economy Class on Azerbaijan Airlines offers a range of features and services at an affordable price. Economy Class seats provide legroom and are designed with reclining features and adjustable headrests. Economy Class in Boeing 787 and Boeing 767 aircraft features 10.6-inch touch screen monitors that offer access to a catalog of films, television series, music, and audio recordings. Airbus A319, Airbus A320, and Boeing 757 planes offer overhead monitors and access to multimedia content via "Wi-Fi Streaming." Azerbaijan Airlines provides passengers with Azerbaijani publications, with the selection varying based on the flight route. Economy Class passengers receive a free baggage allowance based on ticket price. Additional baggage is available for an additional cost. Meals and beverages are offered on board, depending on the departure time and destination. Special meals are available to suit dietary requirements at least 24 hours before departure.

==== Premium Economy ====
Premium Economy Class on Azerbaijan Airlines includes seats with extra legroom and wide-angle recline. Passengers receive priority check-in and boarding at airports, as well as priority lane service on departure from Terminal 1 of Heydar Aliyev International Airport and fast track service on arrival. Access to the AZAL Lounge at Terminal 1 of Heydar Aliyev International Airport is provided, along with priority check-in and baggage handling. Premium economy passengers can also access business class lounges at airports where the service is available. The class includes an increased free baggage allowance. Meals and beverages in Premium Economy Class are served on porcelain, and passengers receive a hot towel before each meal. Each premium economy class seat on Boeing 787 aircraft has a 10.6-inch touch screen display with a selection of movies, TV programs, music, and audio recordings. Azerbaijani publications are offered, with the selection varying depending on the flight route. On long-haul flights, passengers receive a travel kit containing personal hygiene items, cosmetic products, and accessories. Children up to 6 years old receive a soft toy, while children aged 6–10 receive a children's kit.

==== Business Class ====
Business Class on Azerbaijan Airlines provides seats with extra legroom and wide-angle recline. Business Class passengers are provided with priority check-in and boarding at airports, as well as use of the AZAL Lounge at Terminal 1 of Heydar Aliyev International Airport. Priority lane service upon departure and fast track service upon arrival are also available. Business Class passengers have access to business class lounges at airports where the service is provided. An increased free baggage allowance is included. Meals are served along with a variety of non-alcoholic and alcoholic beverages, including champagne, whiskey, cognac, vodka, gin, beer, liqueur, soft drinks, and local and international wines. A selection of hot drinks is also available. In-flight entertainment includes a selection of recent and classic movies, TV programs, music, and audio recordings. Azerbaijani publications are offered, with the selection varying depending on the flight route. On long-haul flights, passengers receive a travel kit containing personal hygiene items, cosmetic products, and accessories. Children up to 6 years old receive a soft toy, while children aged 6–10 receive a children's kit.

=== In-flight entertainment ===
Azerbaijan Airlines offers a range of media content to provide entertainment during the flight. It includes newly released Hollywood movies, foreign movies, educational documentaries, comedies, music videos, soundtracks, and miscellaneous media files in several language alternatives. Younger travelers also get access to games, cartoons, and animations within the entertainment collection.

=== Frequent-flyer program ===
AZAL Miles is the frequent-flyer program of Azerbaijan Airlines, featuring five status levels. The program allows members to earn flight miles and status points when flying with Azerbaijan Airlines. Accumulated flight miles can be redeemed for award tickets or other privileges. Award tickets are available for round-trip or one-way international travel but cannot be used for charter, transit, or domestic flights. They are valid for one year from the departure date. The number of flight miles required for award tickets is the same for adults and children. These tickets can only be purchased in the name of the member or their family account members, with the head of the family account authorized to make purchases on behalf of themselves and their family members.

Some of the benefits available to AZAL Miles members include earning bonus flight miles, free of charge changes and refunds on award tickets, and eligibility for cabin upgrades. Access to airport lounges, priority check-in and boarding, and the ability to book seats in advance are also offered to members. Additional benefits include fast track services, additional baggage allowances, and priority baggage handling. The program also offers features such as inviting friends, birthday miles, and a family account to manage miles collectively. Members can recover tickets after flights, reclaim lost miles, and transfer flight miles across accounts. Flight miles can also be converted into status points, and both status points and flight miles can be purchased.

== Fleet ==
As of October 2025, the Azerbaijan Airlines fleet consists of the following aircraft:

Aircraft	In service	Orders	Passengers					Notes
Aircraft	In service	Orders	J	W	Y	Total	Refs	Notes
Airbus A319-100	3	—	8	—	114	122		1 operated for government
Airbus A320-200	10	—	12	—	144	156		
Airbus A320neo	8	3	—	—	186	186		Deliveries from 2026. To replace Boeing 757-200.
Airbus A321neo	2	4	TBA					Deliveries from 2026. To replace Boeing 757-200.
Airbus A340-500	2	—	36	—	201	237		Last operator of its type. To be replaced by Boeing 787-8.
Boeing 757-200	4	—	22	—	158	180		All aircraft have been stored since 2024. To be replaced by Airbus A320neo family.
Boeing 767-300ER	3	—	22	—	176	198		1 operated for government
Boeing 787-8	2	8	18	35	157	210		Deliveries until 2030. To replace Airbus A340-500.
Embraer 190	7	—	—	—	106	106		
VIP fleet
Airbus ACJ319	1	—	VIP					
Airbus ACJ320	1	—	VIP					
Airbus A340-600	1	—	VIP					
Boeing 777-200LR	1	—	VIP					1 with VIP interior
Total	49	20						

=== Photographic gallery ===
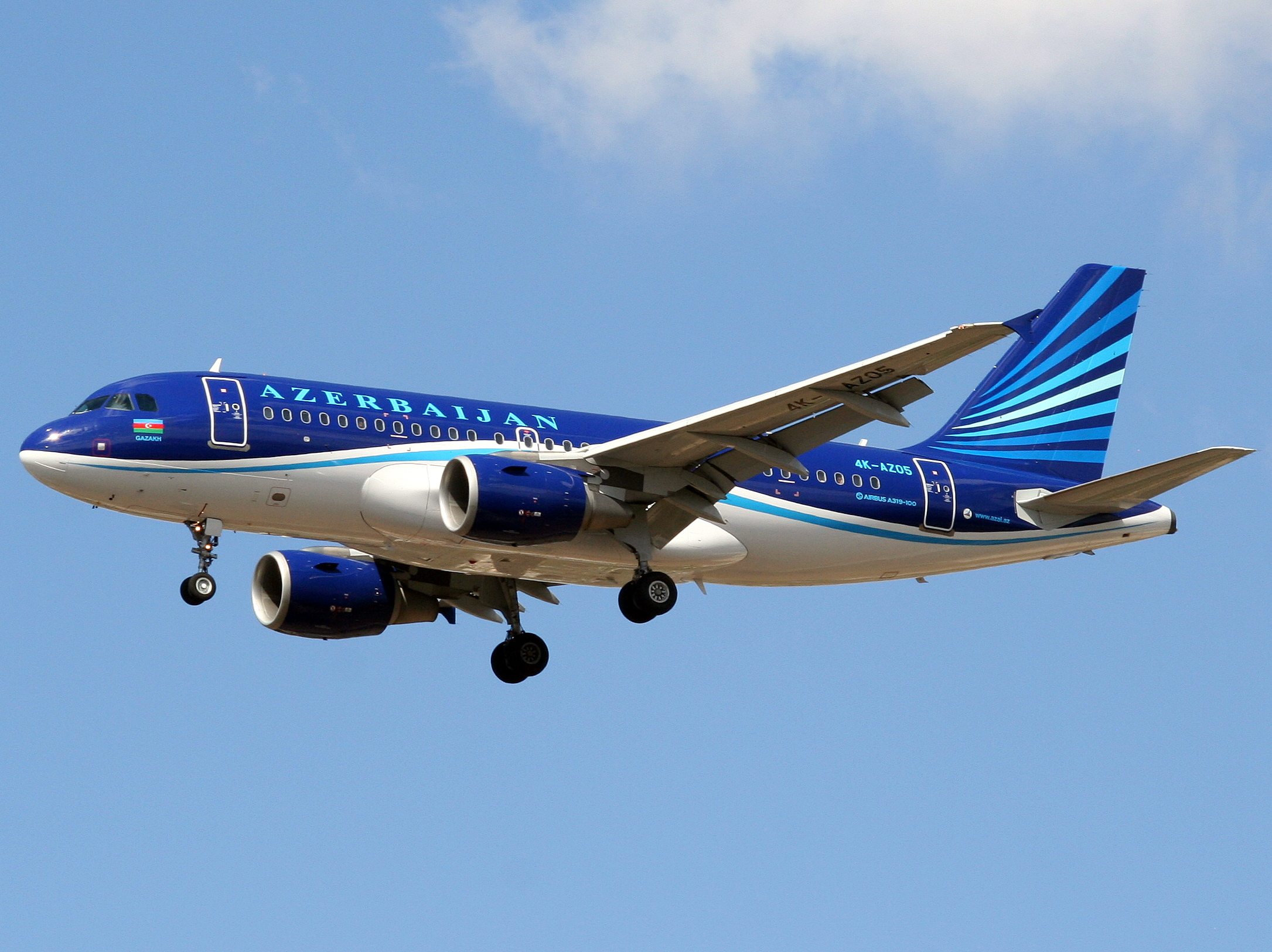
Airbus A319-100

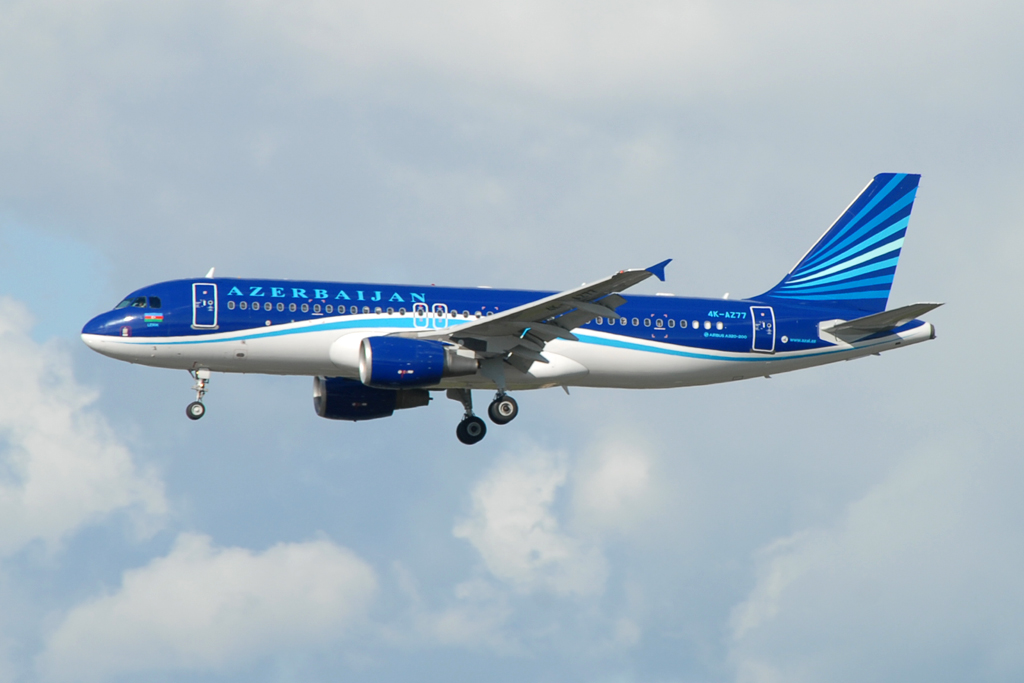
Airbus A320-200

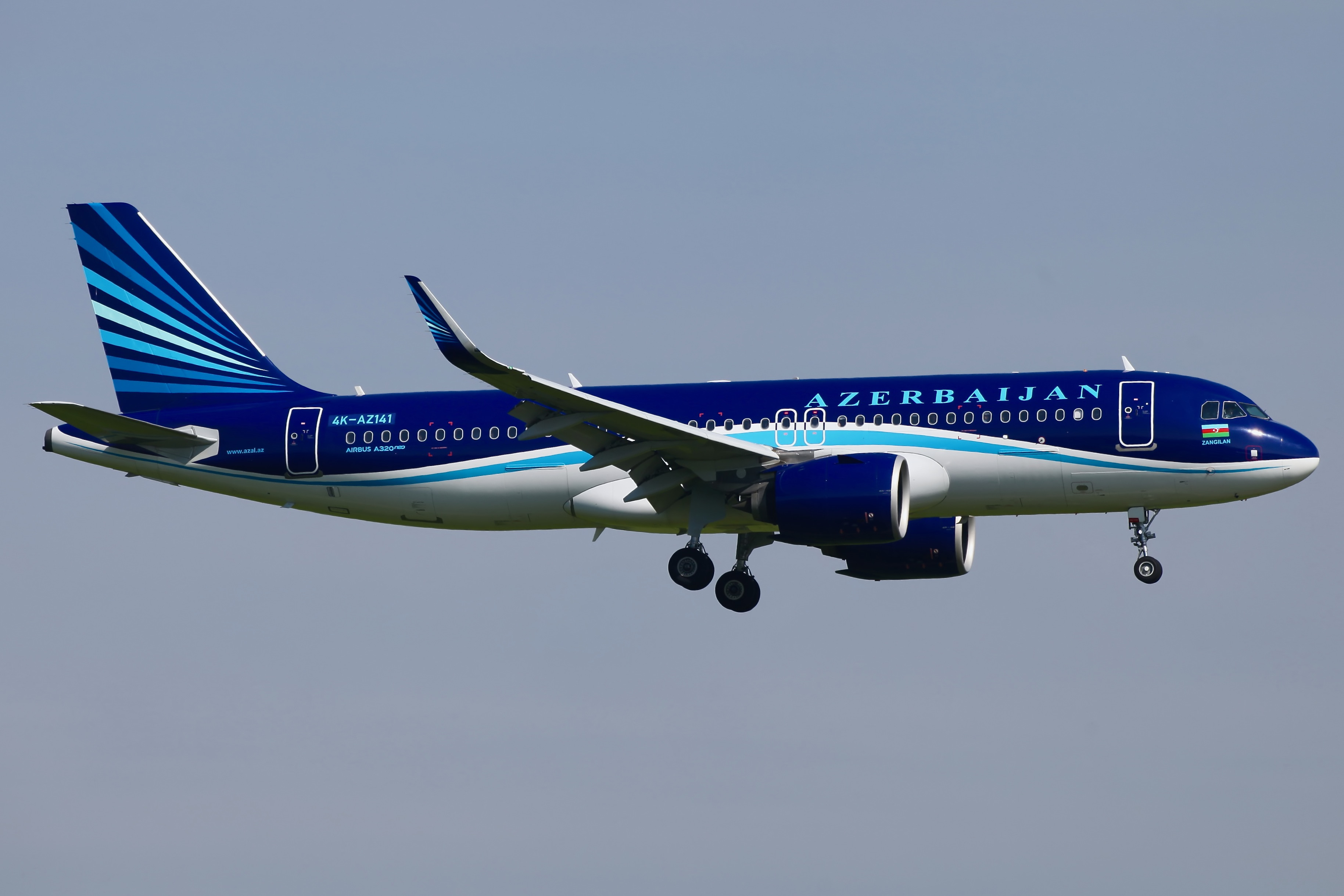
Airbus A320neo

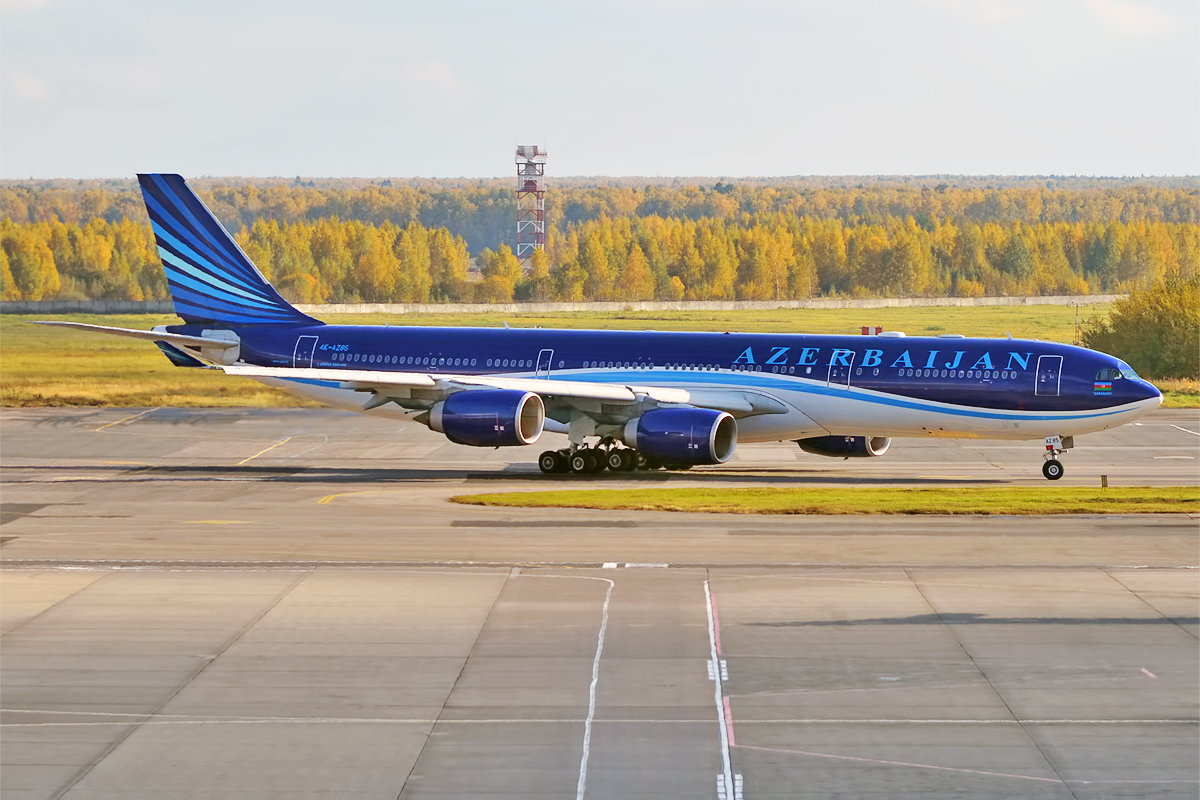
Airbus A340-500

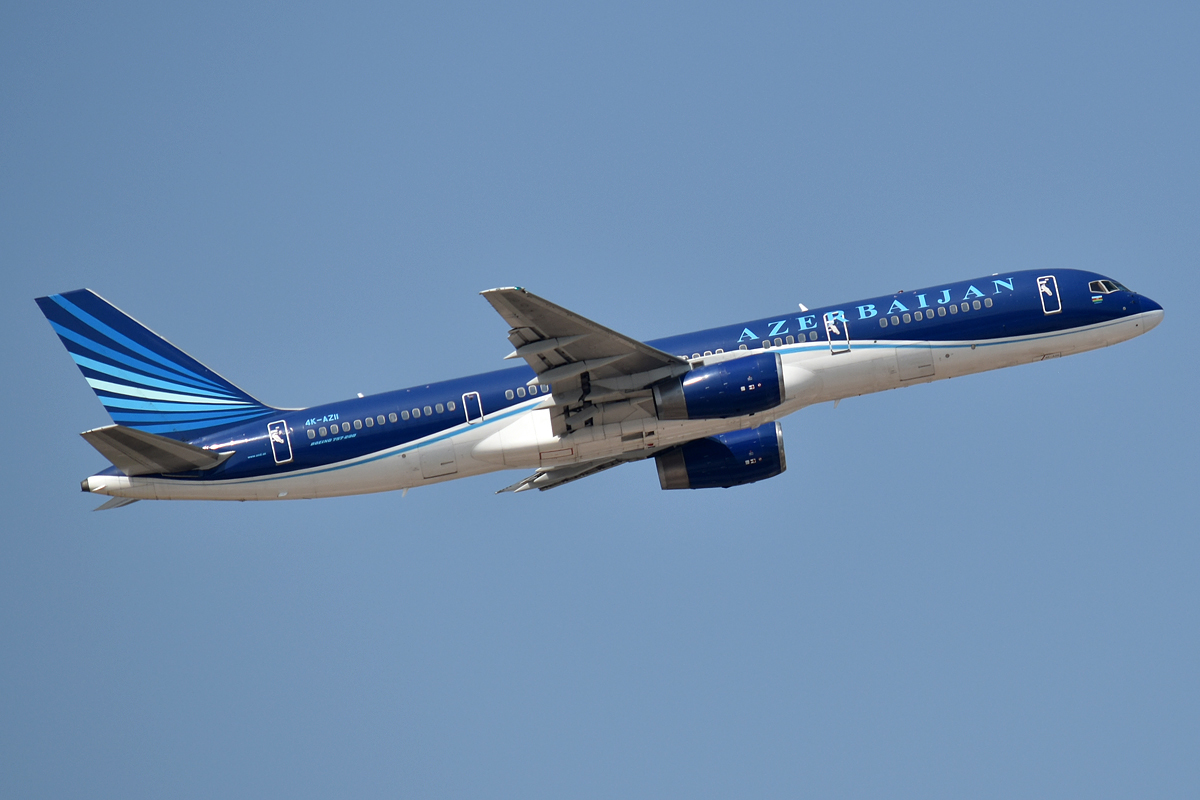
Boeing 757-200

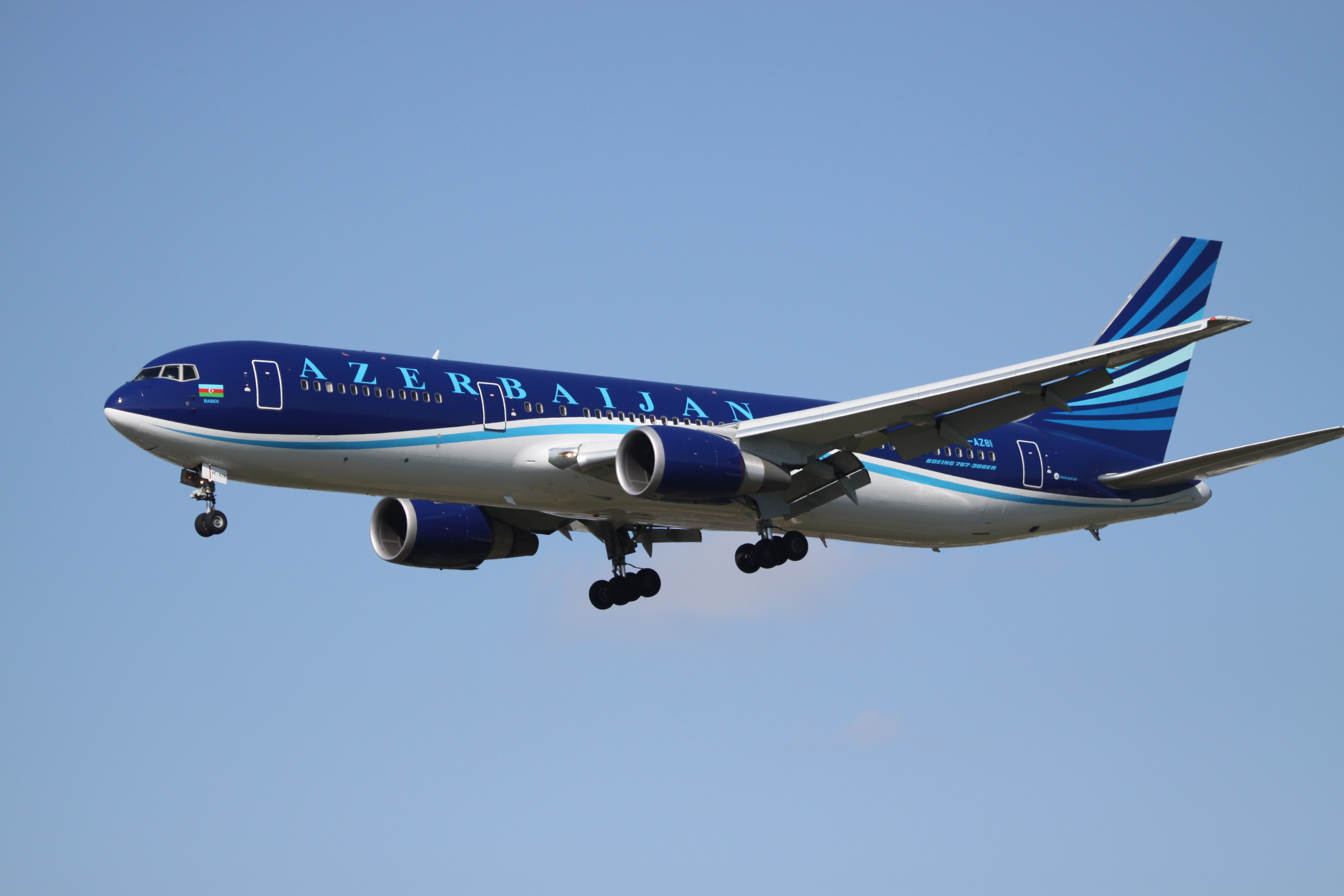
Boeing 767-300ER

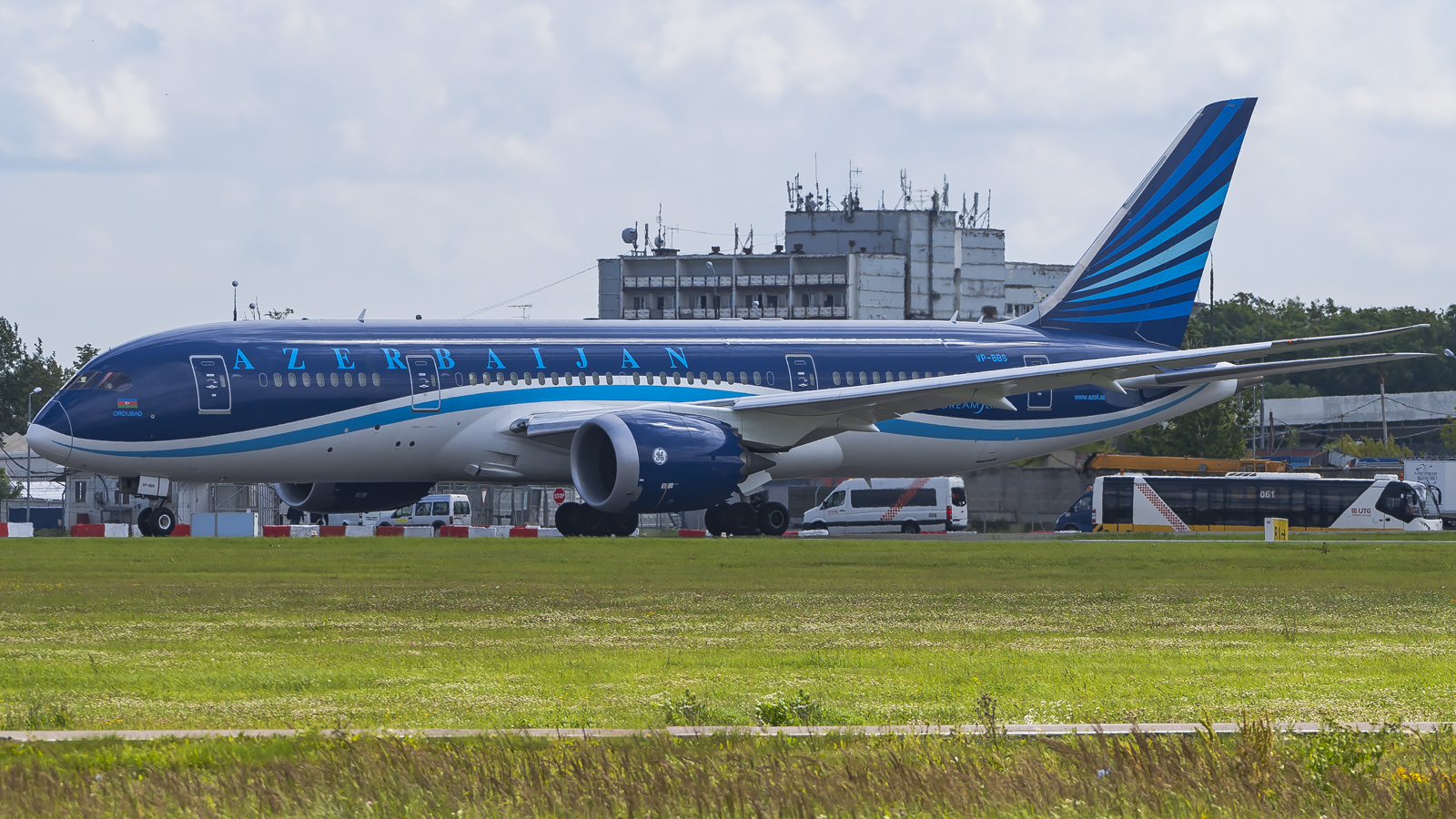
Boeing 787 Dreamliner

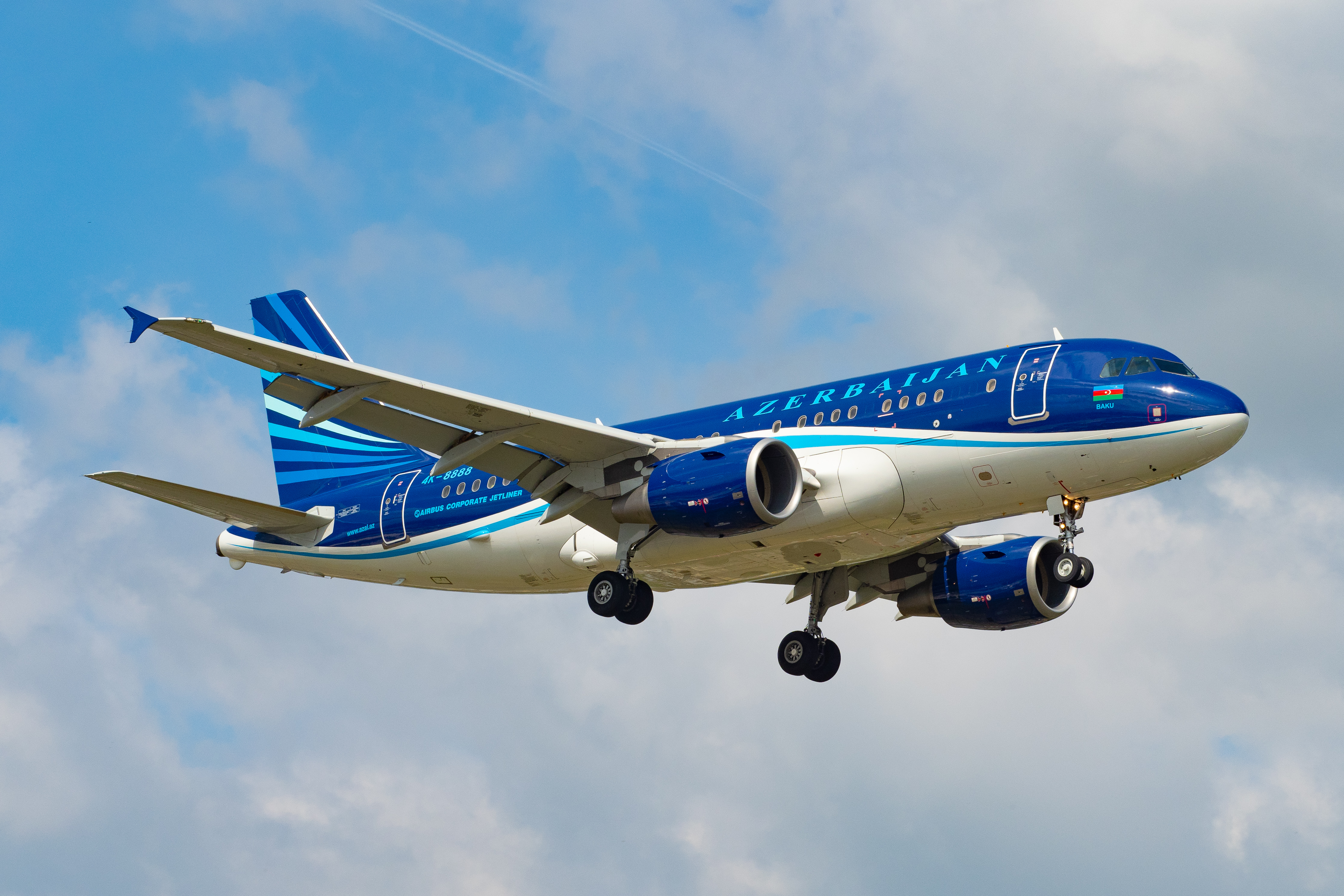
Airbus ACJ319

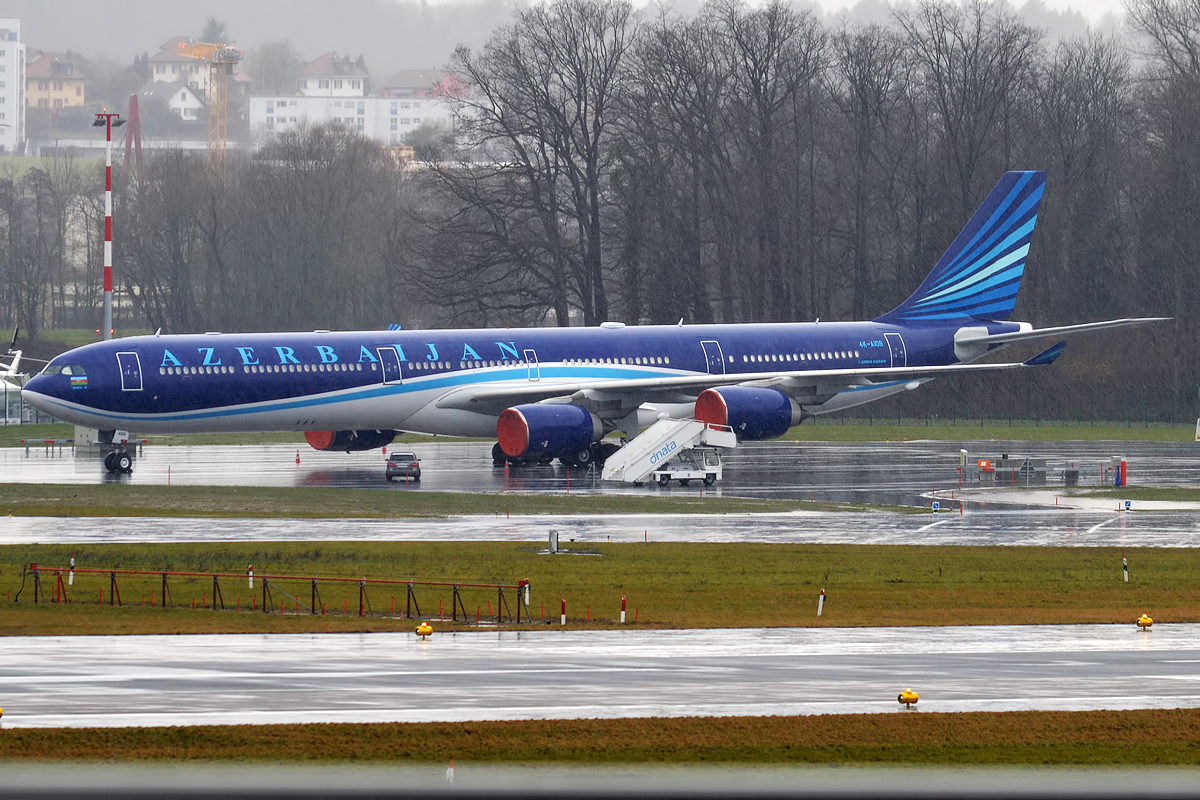
Airbus A340-600

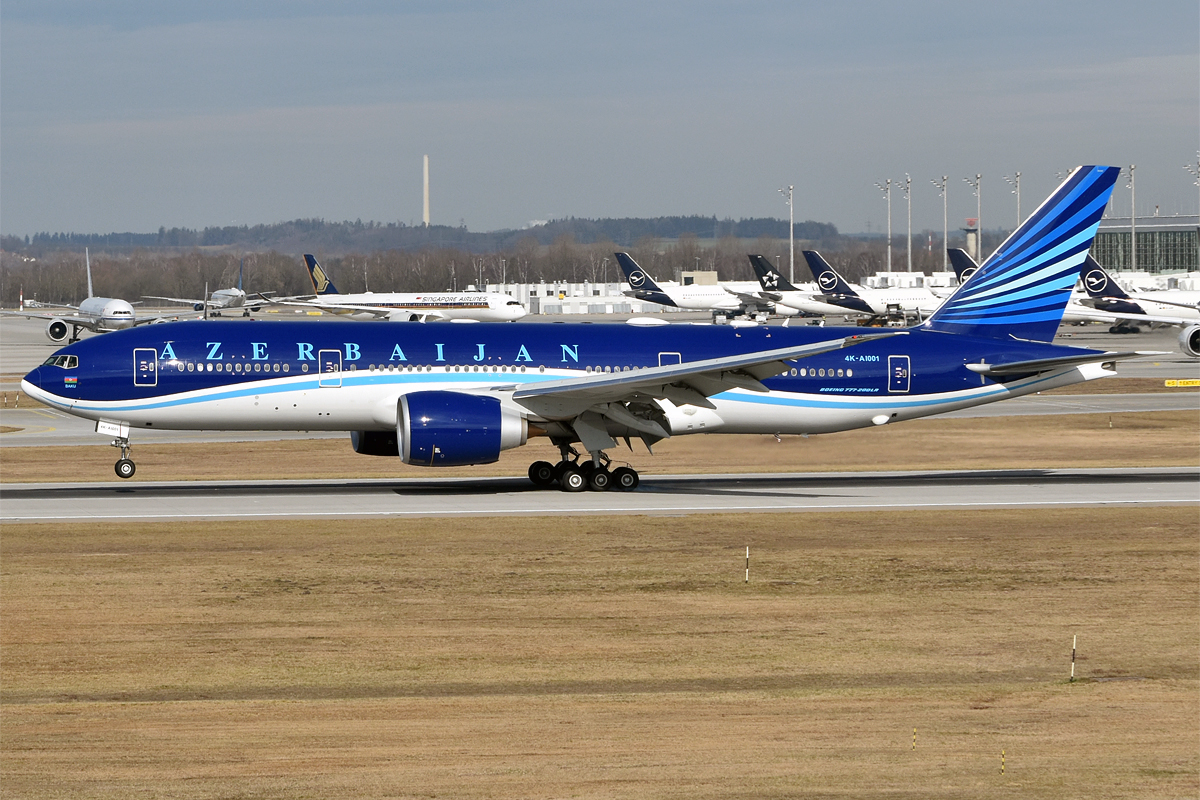
Boeing 777-200LR

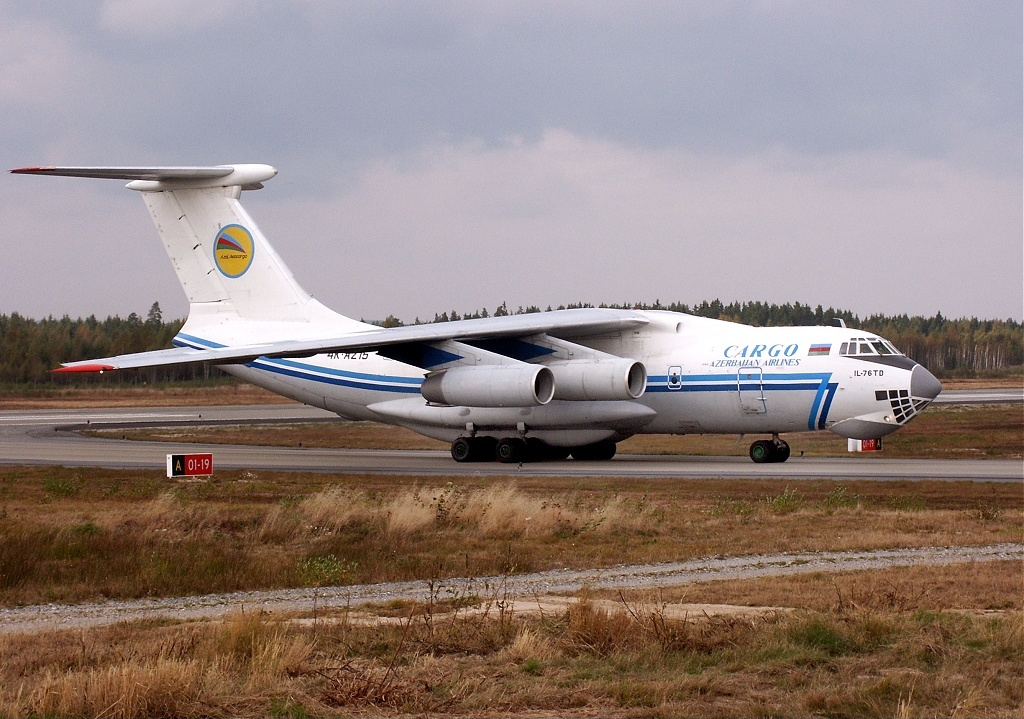
İl-76TD

=== Past years' fleet ===
Azerbaijan Airlines used to operate a number of aircraft, its most common aircraft used to be the Tupolev Tu-154 until it was retired in 2013. All the aircraft the airline used to operate since its foundation are listed below.

Aircraft	Fleet	Introduced	Retired	Notes	Refs
1	2024	Crashed as Flight 8243.			

=== Gallery ===
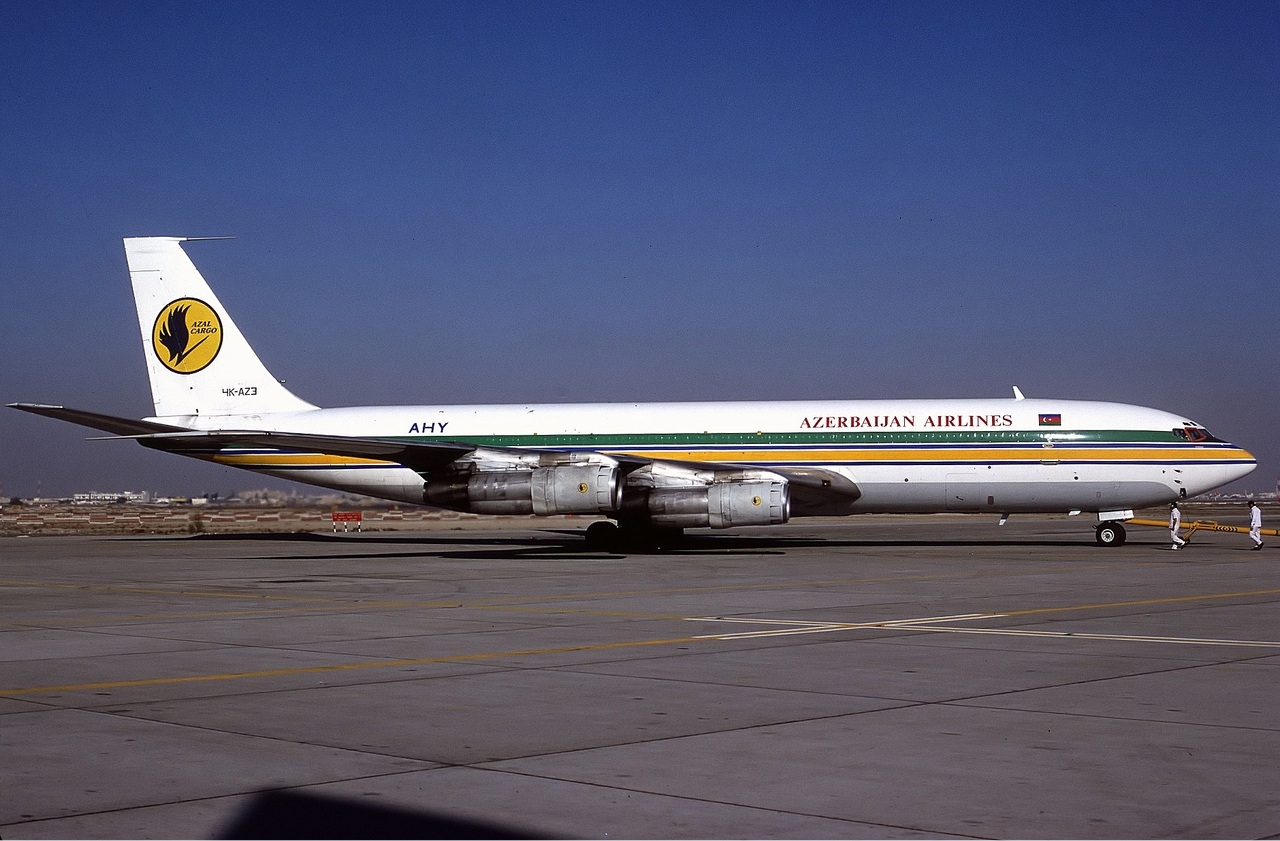
Boeing 707-300

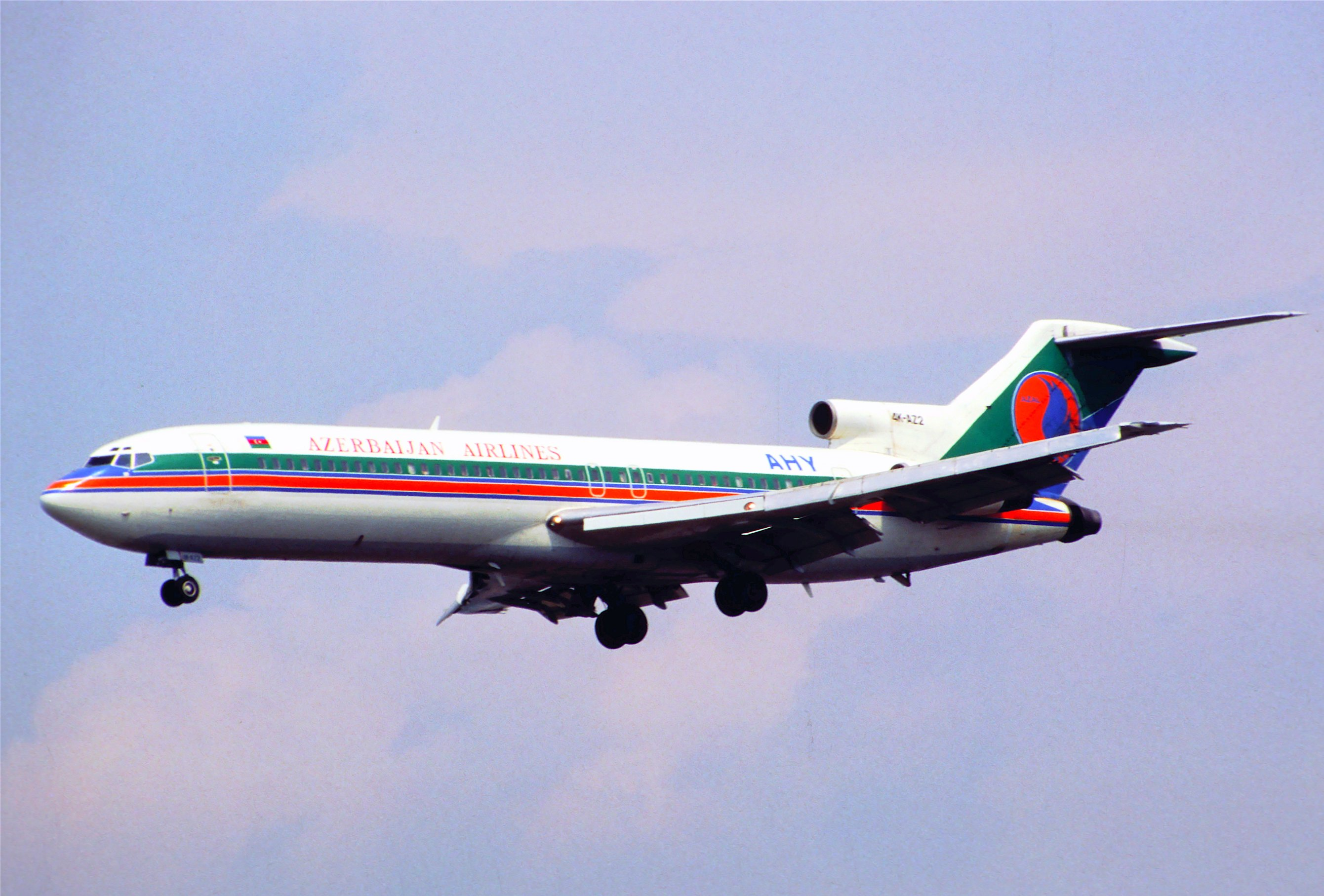
Boeing 727-200 in 1996

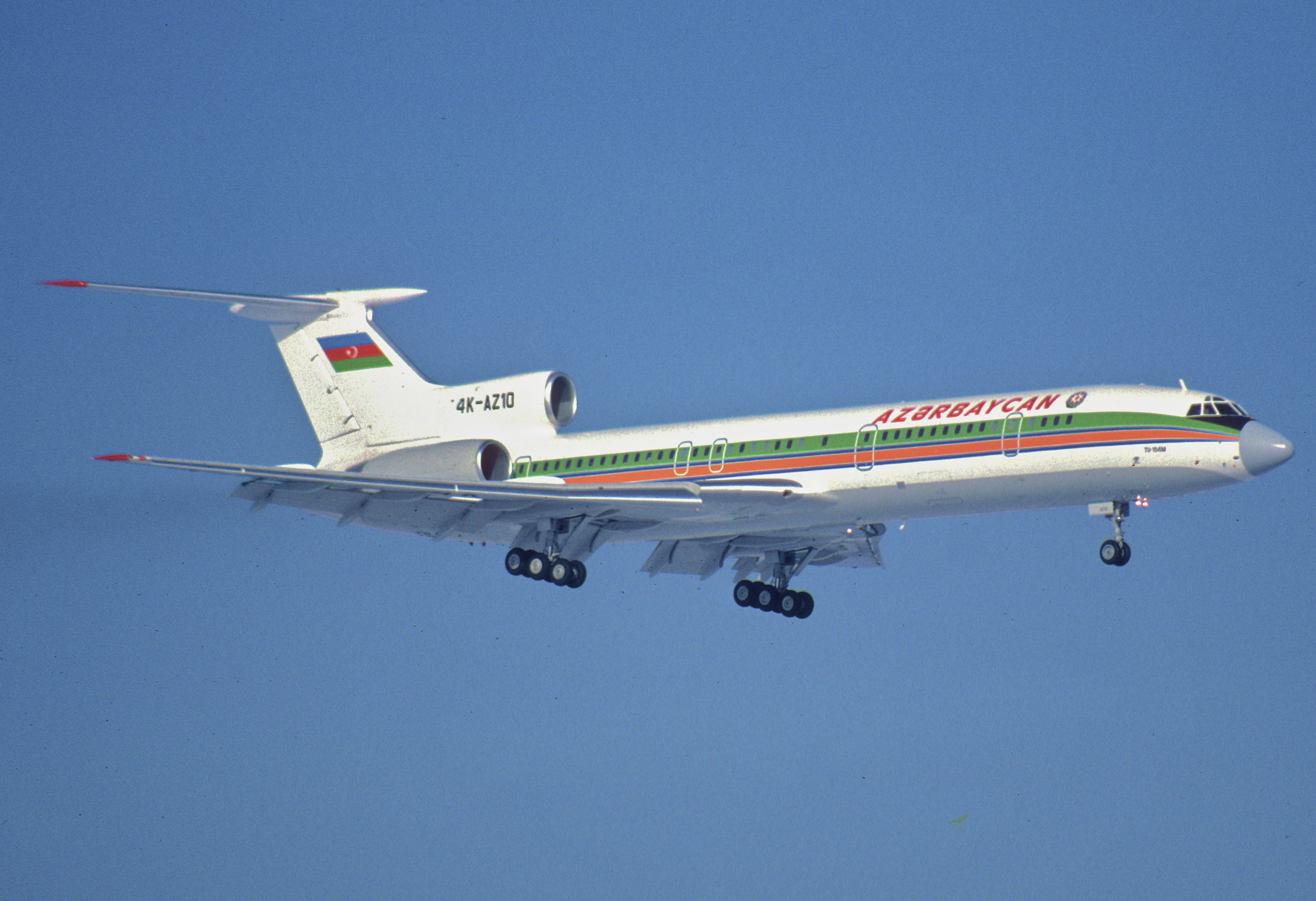
Tupolev TU-154M in 2000

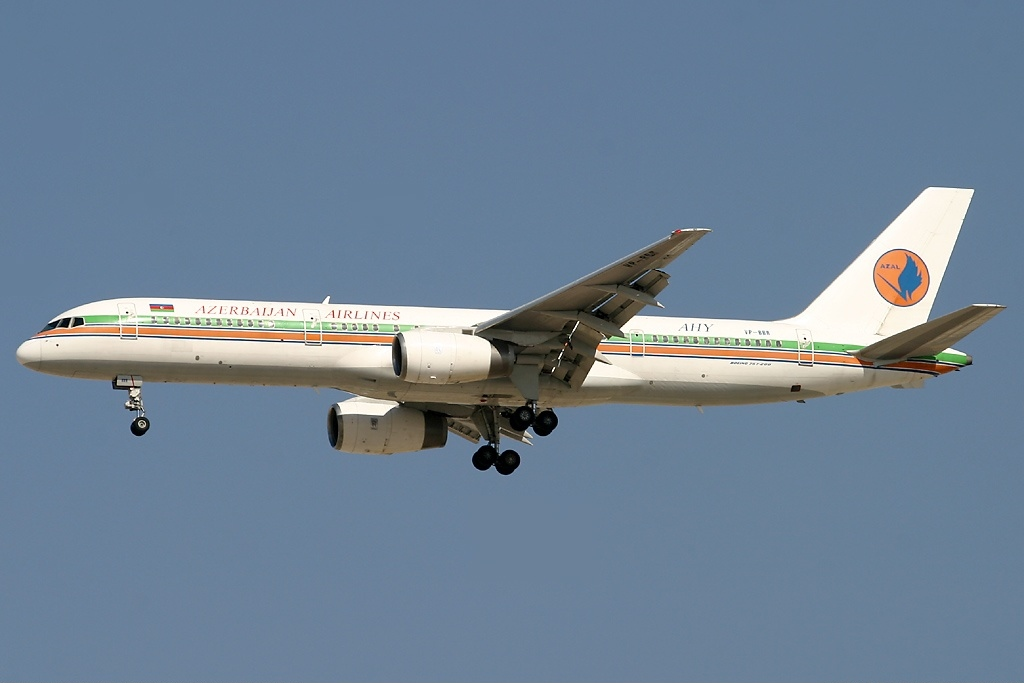
Boeing 757

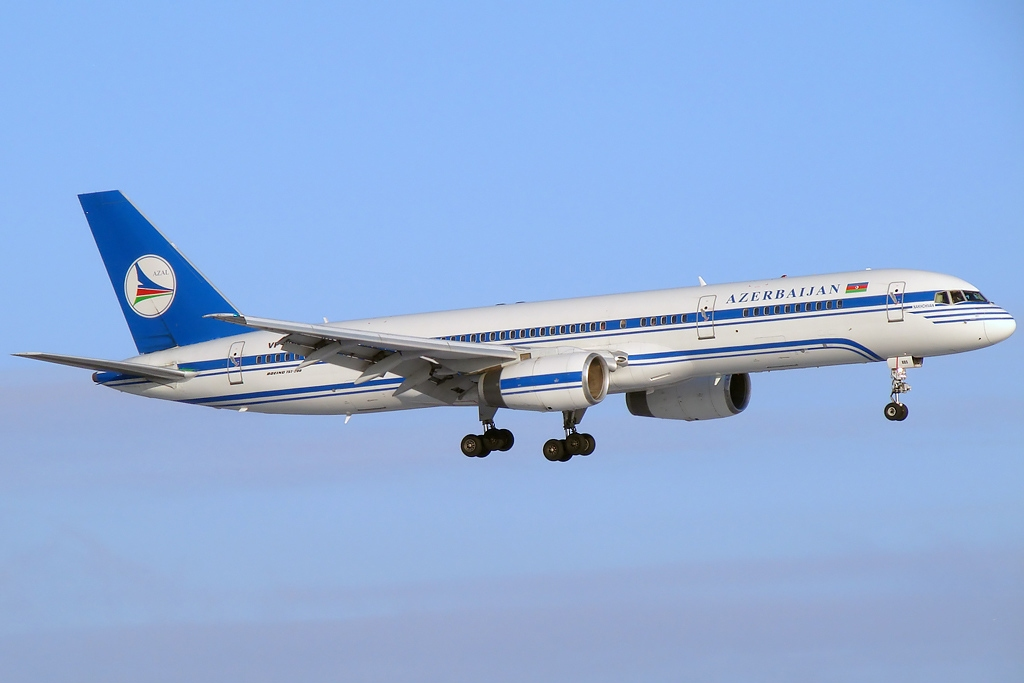
Boeing 757

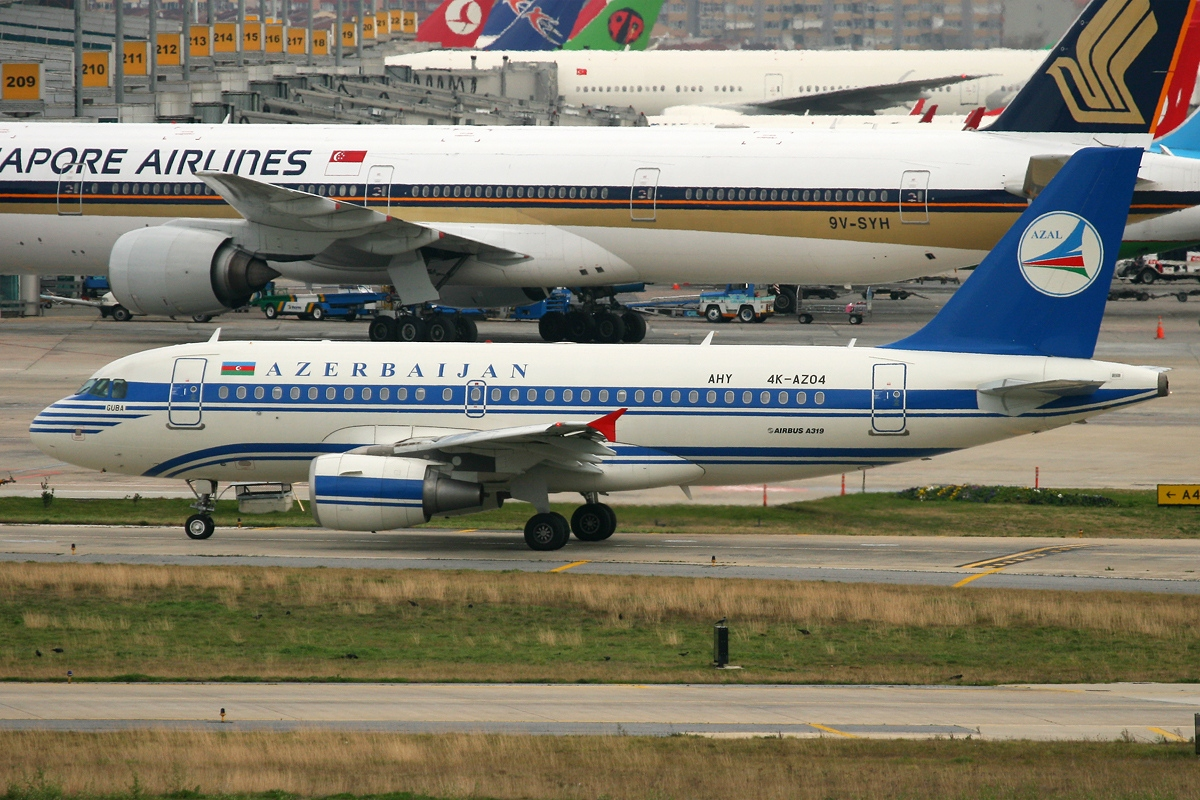
Airbus A319

== Accidents and incidents ==
- On 30 November 1995, at about 19:10 LT, a Boeing 707-323C (4K-401) was en route on a cargo flight from Urumqi (URC), but encountered some problems with the left main landing gear. After a low pass over Baku's runway, the aircraft made a left turn in preparation for landing at the airport. Shortly afterwards, however, the plane struck light stanchions on a road bridge and crashed into a field, killing two crew members and injuring four other people.
- On 5 December 1995, Flight A-56, a Tupolev Tu-134B-3 on a return flight between Baku and Nakhchivan, crashed into a field during an attempted emergency landing due to an engine failure, killing two crew members and 50 passengers; 30 were injured. Investigation revealed that, following the mechanical failure of the left-hand engine – which had failed because it was operated for more than 30 hours with an unrepaired defect – the crew shut down the working right-hand engine.
- On 15 May 1997, a number of Azerbaijani soldiers were returning to camp near Ganja after a small arms practice and had begun shooting at a road sign. At the same time, Yakovlev Yak-40 4K-87504 was returning from a training flight and was above the area on its approach to Ganja Airport. A number of stray bullets struck the Yak-40 and hit an oxygen cylinder. A fire broke out and control was lost. The aircraft crashed 5160 m short of the runway, 95 m left of the extended centerline. All six crew members died.
- On 18 August 2000, a passenger hijacked Flight 154, a Tupolev Tu-154, while the plane was on a domestic trip between Nakhchivan and Baku. The hijacker claimed to be armed with a hand grenade and a bottle of flammable liquid. He demanded that the aircraft, which was carrying 164 passengers, be flown to Istanbul, Turkey, where he wanted to visit a hospitalized Azeri political leader. The hijacker agreed to the pilot's recommendation to refuel in Tbilisi, Georgia. However, the hijacker was overpowered by two Ministry of National Security officials who were on the plane. The plane landed in Baku, and the hijacker was arrested. He did not have a grenade, but reportedly carried two bottles – one containing kerosene and the other an unidentified liquid. The hijacker was identified as the chairman of the Nakhchivan branch of the opposition Musavat Party. A number of the hijacker's largely political demands, including postponing parliamentary elections until December, were printed in an opposition newspaper the following day. Several days after the hijacking, the editor-in-chief of this paper was arrested and charged with terrorism for having maintained contacts with the hijacker. Documents relating to the hijacking were reportedly in his apartment. The hijacker, however, claimed to have acted alone.
- On 23 December 2005, Flight 217, an Antonov An-140 (4K-AZ48) en route to Aktau, Kazakhstan, plunged into the Caspian Sea about 20 miles north of Baku. All 18 passengers and five crew members died. The airline grounded its other remaining An-140 airplanes and postponed plans to purchase more of the type from Ukraine. Investigators discovered that three independent gyroscopes were not providing stabilized heading and attitude performance information to the crew early in the flight.
- On 12 August 2010, Flight 75, an Airbus A319-111 (4K-AZ04, named Guba), suffered a collapse of the undercarriage when the aircraft exited runway 05-23 following arrival at Atatürk International Airport in Istanbul. The aircraft was substantially damaged, but all 127 passengers and crew escaped unharmed.
- On 25 December 2024, Flight 8243, an Embraer 190 (4K-AZ65') from Baku to Grozny, Russia, crashed near Aktau, Kazakhstan while attempting an emergency landing, killing 38 of the 67 people on board. Russian President Vladimir Putin admitted that Russian air defences had struck the aircraft, prompting Azerbaijani President Ilham Aliyev to demand full accountability from Russia and call on it to compensate for the tragedy.

== See also ==
- Civil Aviation Museum of Azerbaijan
- List of airlines of Azerbaijan
- List of airports in Azerbaijan
- List of companies of Azerbaijan
- Transport in Azerbaijan
