= Buta Airways =

Azerbaijani low-cost airline

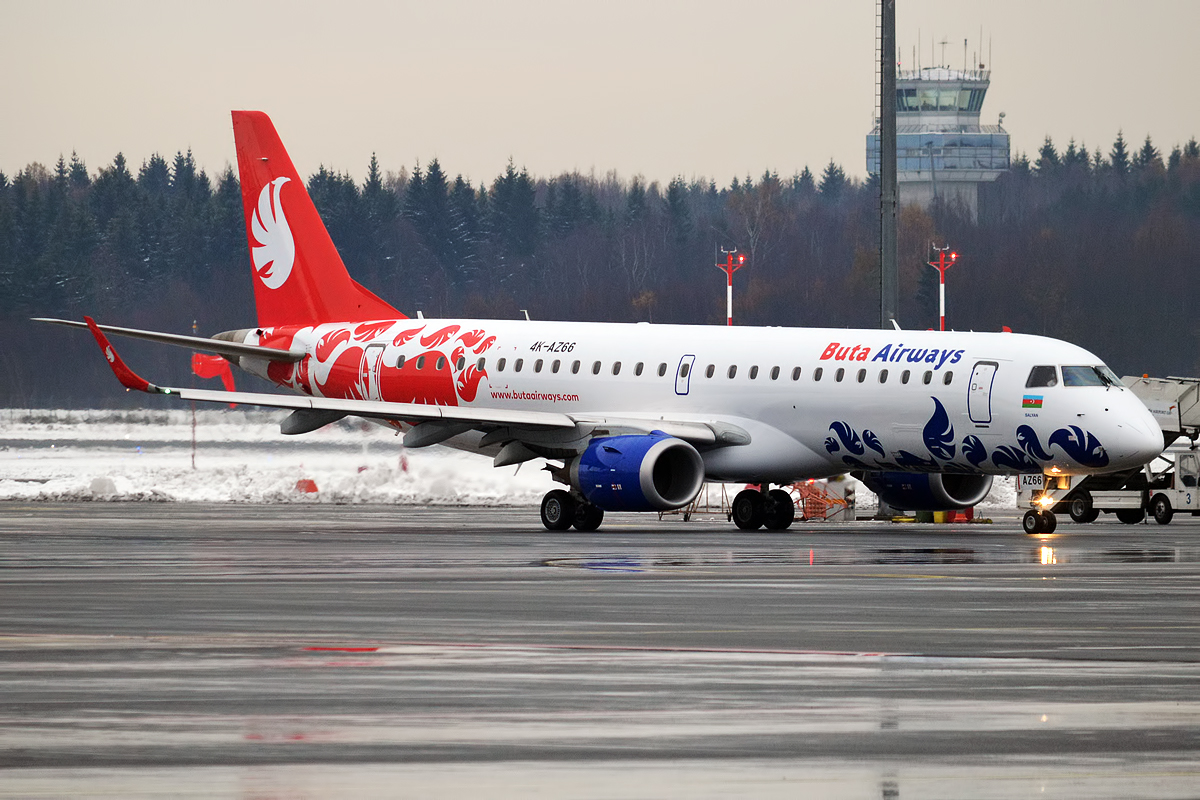
- Embraer E190
IATA	ICAO	Call sign
J2	AHY	AZAL
- Founded: December 2016; 9 years ago
- Commenced operations: 1 September 2017
- Ceased operations: 1 October 2023 (merged with Azerbaijan Airlines)
- Hubs: Heydar Aliyev International Airport
- Frequent-flyer program: AZAL Miles
- Fleet size: 8
- Destinations: 18
- Parent company: Azerbaijan Airlines
- Headquarters: Baku, Azerbaijan
- Website: www.butaairways.az/en/

Buta Airways was an Azerbaijani low-cost virtual carrier headquartered in Baku, Azerbaijan, with its primary operational base at Heydar Aliyev International Airport. Buta Airways was the successor to AZALJet and a fully owned subsidiary of Azerbaijan Airlines with which it merged in 2023.

== History ==
In December 2015, it was announced that Azerbaijan Airlines would set up its own in-house, low-cost airline named AZALJet. Schedules were launched in September 2016. After some months of operations, it was decided that AZALJet would be replaced by a new airline named Buta Airways, which would have a fleet of two Embraer aircraft in its own livery, operated by its own staff and with an independent tariff policy.

On 2 June 2017, the airline's livery and logo were approved. The logo reflects the symbolism of the mythological sacred bird Simurg, represented in the form of the Azerbaijani ornament buta. On the aircraft's aft and forward section, buta patterns are drawn in blue, which represents the airline's ties with Azerbaijan Airlines, and also in a bright red, which refers to Azerbaijan's flag. Also in June 2017, the airline announced that its minimum airfare for a one-way journey will start at 29 euros. Despite being a low-cost airline, Buta Airways offers free sandwiches and water on board for all customers. Passengers can purchase additional services including baggage, hot meals and seat selection at an additional cost. The name change took place on 1 September.

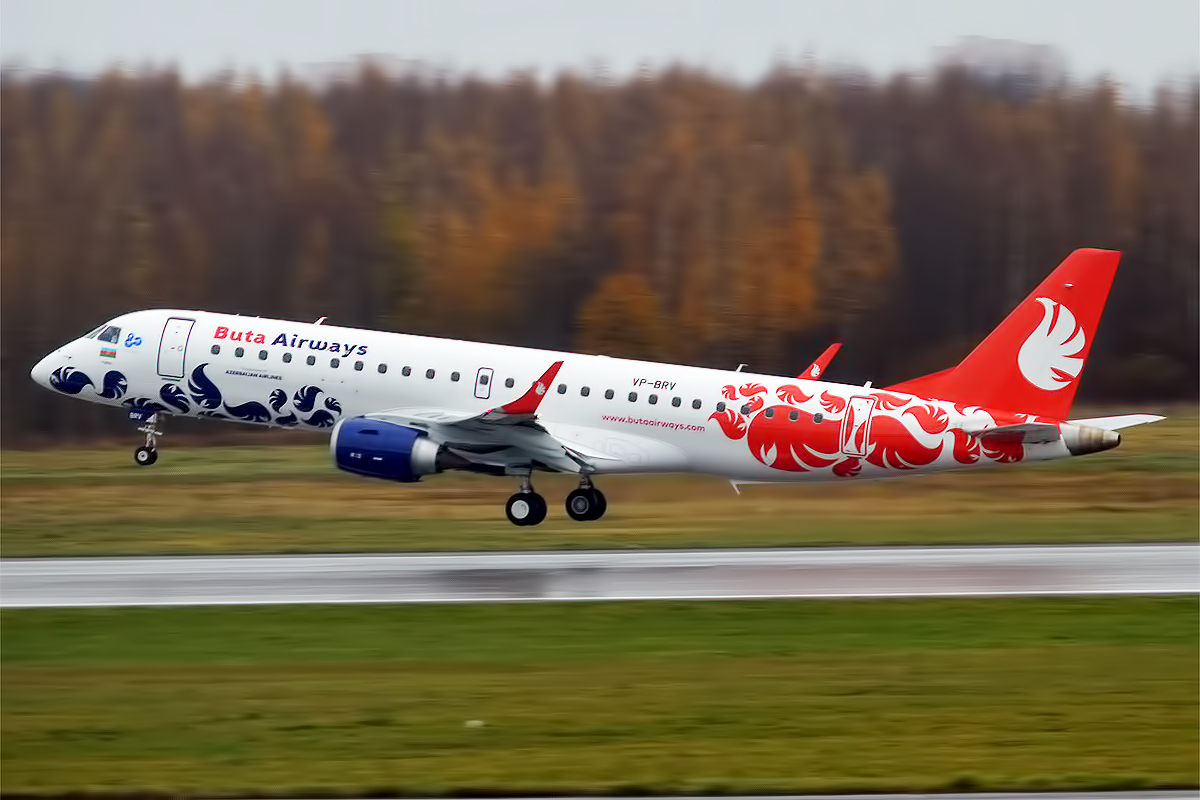
An Embraer E190

On 16 January 2018, Buta Airways began its first service to a destination within Europe, with a once weekly service to Sofia. Later that year, in December, Buta Airways welcomed its eighth Embraer E190 jet. In 2019, Buta Airways added Batumi, Ufa and Odesa to make 18 destinations for the airline.

Since the Russian invasion of Ukraine in February 2022, Buta Airways suspended all the flights to Russia for an indefinite period "due to the risks relating to performance of international flights". However, 4 months later in June 2022, Buta Airlines resumed air links with Russian cities. As of April 2023, Buta Airlines had resumed Russian routes from Baku to Astrakhan, Mineralnye Vody, Kazan, Ufa, Moscow and had opened a new route from Baku to Volgograd in January 2023.

On 28 July 2023, it was announced that Buta Airways would be merge into Azerbaijan Airlines in the following month of October.

== Destinations ==
As of January 2019, Buta Airways planned to fly to 18 destinations, in 7 countries.

== Fleet ==
As of October 2019, the Buta Airways fleet consisted of the following aircraft:

Buta Airways fleet
Aircraft	In service	Orders	Passengers	Notes
Embraer E190	8	—	106	Returned to Azerbaijan Airlines.
Total	8	—		
