= Investment in Azerbaijan =

The overall investment climate in Azerbaijan continues to grow despite significant challenges remain. Over the recent years, the country has made efforts to integrate more fully into the global marketplace and attract foreign investment.

== History ==
=== Early history ===
Several foreign companies and entrepreneurs came to the Caucasus in the late 19th century. They saw the opportunities and resource extraction. Investment of foreign, especially, western companies in Azerbaijan began from the late 19th century.

The Siemens brothers came across the copper mine in Gadabay at almost the same time as the Nobel brothers got involved in the oil industry in Baku. Siemens & Halske AG had won a contract to build and maintain the telegraph lines in Russia, including the Caucasus, in the 1850s and 1860s. During this period, Walter von Siemens spotted the lucrative business opportunity in Gadabay and convinced his older brothers, Carl and Werner, to invest in it.

The purchase of the mine by the Siemens brothers was disliked by their partner, Johann Halske, which contributed to his break from Siemens & Halske AG. The reason was that the company's major industrial focus was not mining, but telegraphic services, communications and electric power generation. The brothers did not merge the mining industry into their main company. They ran this industry as a private business of the Siemens brothers – Werner, Carl and Walter. Gebruder Siemens (Siemens Brothers) purchased the copper mines in Gadabay in 1864. The copper mine of Gadabay is one of the oldest mines during the prehistoric times. They renovated mines and factories, built a railroad system, villages, and bridges. In 1865 they built a copper smelter and in 1873 connected it to the mine by a 6-km narrow gauge railway.Azerbaijan Railways CJSC and the German Siemens company still try to enhance cooperation.

The Bibi-Heybat power plant was founded with participation of Siemens in 1901. Siemens completed the 11,000 km Indo-European telegraph line from London to Calcutta in 1867, part of which went through Azerbaijani territory. Siemens established a representative office in Baku, Azerbaijan in 1998. Siemens supports the development and improvement of the country's power generation, transmission and distribution network.

German business had a role in Azerbaijani industry during the history. Gebruder Vohrer (Vohrer Brothers) began to affix their own label on bottles in 1847. Gebruder Hummel (Hummel Brothers) established their wine-producing business in 1878 and constructed the first brandy factory in 1895.

==== Nobel Brothers in Baku ====
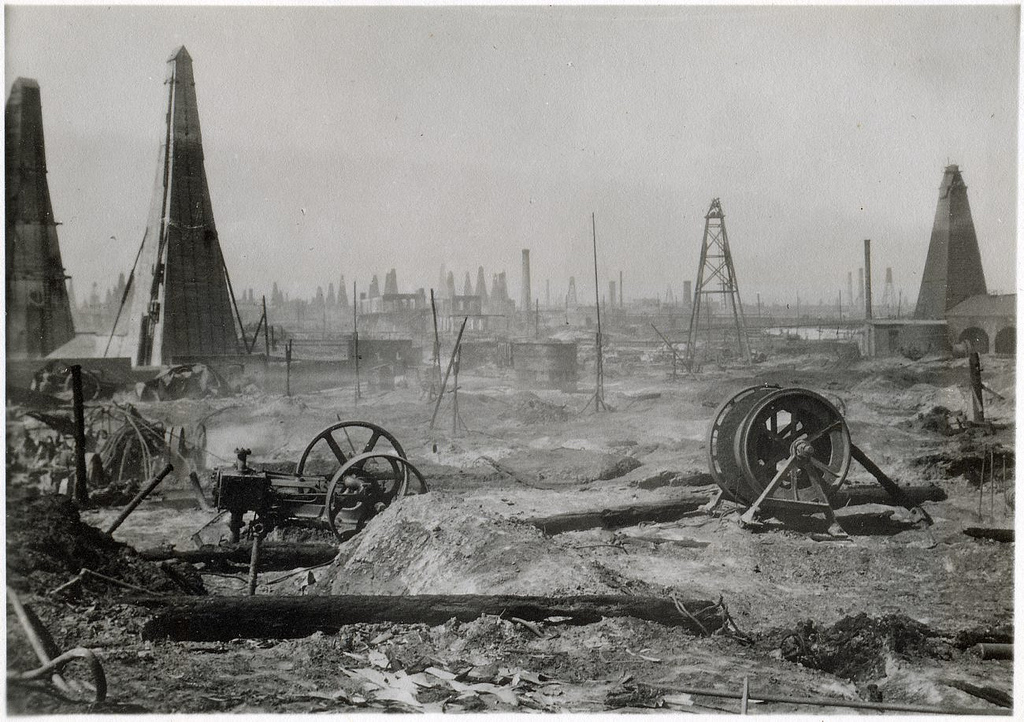
The Nobel Brothers Naftaproductioncorporation

Foreign investors were attracted by Azerbaijani oil. Nobel Brothers is the first foreign firm investing in "Baku oil industry”. Until the early 20th century the Nobel Brothers company was the leading company in Azerbaijan. The company was made up of more than 20 subsidiary firms with a total capital investment of more than 130 million roubles in 1917.Azerbaijan's oil was great investment for the Nobel Brothers but also important factor in Sweden and the world economy. The Nobel Brothers company began work in 1879. The company was established by the brothers Robert, Ludwig and Alfred. The company became the most authoritative and valuable oil concern in Russia and worldwide.

==== Rothchilds Brothers ====
The Rothschild Brothers founded the Caspian and Black Sea Oil Industry and Trade Society on 16 May 1883. Minister of State Property Michael Ostrovsky came to Baku in September accompanied by his brother, the playwright Alexander Ostrovsky (1818-1883), to discuss oil-related issues. The Rothschild brothers founded the Mazut Transportation Society. The Society had 13 large tankers in the Caspian Sea, in addition other auxiliary ships.

=== Modern history ===
The Agreement was signed in Gulustan Palace in Baku on 20 September 1994. Afterwards, the Agreement was named as the Contract of the Century. On 24 September 1994, at a meeting of heads of state and government of the Commonwealth of Independent States (CIS) Heydar Aliyev signed documents. 13 companies (Amoco, BP, McDermott, Unocal, SOCAR, LukOil, Statoil, Exxon, TPAO, Pennzoil, Itochu, Ramco, Delta) from 8 countries (Azerbaijan, USA, Great-Britain, Russia, Turkey, Norway, Japan, Saudi Arabia) have taken part in signing of the Contract of the Century. Tim Eggar UK Energy Minister; John Browne, BP; President Heydar Aliyev; Bill White, US Energy Deputy Secretary; Usam Jafari, Islamic Bank of Development, BP Interpreter; Stanislav Pugach, Russian Ministry of Fuel and Energy; Nabil Al-Khowaiter, DNKL; Tom Hamilton, Pennzoil; UK interpreter; Lukoil, Johan Nic Vold, Statoil; John Imle, Unocal; Natiq Aliyev, SOCAR; Thomas Young, UK Ambassador; Sitki Sancar, Turkish Petroleum. Back Row: Richard Kauzlerich, US Ambassador; Eldar Namazov, Presidential Advisor; Hasan Hasanov, Foreign Minister attended the signing of the contract. The contract calls for a total $7.4 billion investment over 30 years in three oil fields. The working structures were formulated by the parties of the agreement – the Steering Committee, Azerbaijan International Operating Company (AIOC) and the Consulting Council following the signing.

Following the agreement, rapid increase was observed in the rate of the foreign investment into the country. The country has attracted $108 billion of investments. 43.4% or $46.6 billion came from outside. The non-oil sector also saw 45.3% or $21.1 billion of this total investment. After signing of ‘the Contract of the Century’, 31 international contracts related with other fields in the Azerbaijani sector of the Caspian Sea were signed with other oil companies.

== Investment environment ==
According to the statement of the US Department of State on the Azerbaijan investment climate, published in May 2015, under Azerbaijani law, foreign investors may engage in investment activities not prohibited by law. Private entities are allowed to establish, acquire and dispose of interests freely in business enterprises. Foreign citizens, organizations, and enterprises may lease, but may not own land.

Given to the report, the country has worked to integrate more fully into the global economic marketplace, attract increased foreign investment, diversify its economy and maintain positive growth. The country proceeds to follow the strategy of attracting foreign direct investment to support economic diversification.

The late government of Azerbaijan approved the Law on Protection of Foreign Investments in 1992, which was recently replaced by the Law on Investment activity, on which full legal protection was provided for international investors. The law also ensures equal treatment towards both foreign and local investors and enables the repatriation of profits, revenues and other investment-related funds as long as applicable taxes have been paid. The Law on the Protection of Foreign Investments protects foreign investors against nationalization and requisition, excluding certain specified circumstances. The nationalization of property can occur when authorized by parliamentary resolution, although cases of official nationalization or requisition against foreign companies have not been recorded in Azerbaijan.

An exemption from income, land, and property taxes for business parks, for example in the sector of information technology, in Azerbaijan has been created at the new amendments made to the Tax Code in 2013. These amendments also provide tax and customs privileges for the residents of industrial and technological parks for a term of seven years.

The ability of foreign companies to take part in subsidized research and development programs financed or subsidized by the government in Azerbaijan is not restricted.

Azerbaijan also joined to the Convention Establishing the World Intellectual Property Organization which sets norms and standards for the protection and enforcement of intellectual property rights, the Paris Convention for Protection of Industrial Property, and the Berne Convention for the Protection of Literary and Artistic Works. Azerbaijan is a party to the Geneva Phonograms Convention, and acceded to the two WIPO Internet treaties in 2005.

The country also ranked 33 among 144 countries in the World Economic Forum Global Competitiveness Index on 2014-2015 mainly regarding to maintenance of a stable macroeconomic policy environment over the last ten years, and places at 9 out of 144 countries for macroeconomic environment.

Azerbaijan develops its market infrastructure, including legal, tax and banking systems and relations with the international business community. It enables the businesses entering Azerbaijan to calculate the risks and make decisions. The following entities and individuals can be foreign investors in Azerbaijan:

- Foreign legal persons;
- Foreign citizens, stateless persons, and citizens of Azerbaijan with a permanent residence abroad subject to registration in their country of residence for engaging in economic activity;
- Foreign countries;
- International organizations;

=== Bilateral Agreements ===
Azerbaijan has signed 48 Bilateral Investment Treaties (BIT). Azerbaijan has bilateral investment agreements with the following countries: Albania, Austria, Belarus, Belgium, Bulgaria, Czech Republic, China, Croatia, Egypt, Estonia, Finland, France, Georgia, Germany, Greece, Iran, Israel, Italy, Jordan, Kazakhstan, Korea, Kyrgyzstan, Latvia, Lithuania, Lebanon, Montenegro, Moldova, North Macedonia, Norway, Pakistan, Poland, Qatar, Romania, Russia, Serbia, Saudi Arabia, Syria, Switzerland, Tajikistan, Turkey, UAE, Ukraine, the United Kingdom, and Uzbekistan. Relevant measures are taken to develop the entrepreneurship in Azerbaijan and the patronage of the state in the following direction. President of the Republic of Azerbaijan created a Council for Entrepreneurs and the Fund of Encouragement of Investments and Consulting in Azerbaijan.

The Foreign Direct Investment (FDI) to the Republic of Azerbaijan has been rising steadily recently. Those flows are mainly directed towards the energy sector. The amount of FDA flows was US$5.4 billion in 2016. Oil and gas sector is the biggest share of the foreign investment. The country aims to attract the investors to diverse sectors such as agriculture, transportation, tourism and information/communication technology.

== Current investments ==
=== Southern Gas Corridor ===
The Southern Gas Corridor consists of three projects: South Caucasus Pipeline (SCP), the Trans Anatolian Pipeline (TANAP) and the Trans Adriatic Pipeline (TAP). These projects are called as the Southern Gas Corridor. The Southern Gas Corridor is set to change the energy map of the region by connecting gas supplies in the Caspian to markets in Europe. The Southern Gas Corridor is one of the most complex gas value chains in the world. First gas is planned for late 2018, with supplies to Georgia and Turkey. Gas to Europe are predicted over a year after first gas is produced offshore Azerbaijan. The Southern Gas Corridor pipeline system has been formed to expand to twice its capacity to accommodate potential additional gas supplies in the future.

=== TANAP ===
The Government of the Republic of Turkey and the Government of the Republic of Azerbaijan signed the Memorandum of Understanding between the State Oil Company of Azerbaijan Republic (SOCAR) within the TANAP Natural Gas Transmission Company on 24 December 2011. The TANAP Project was created and the design, construction and subsequent operation of the project was entitled. The development objective of the Trans-Anatolian Natural Gas Pipeline (TANAP) Project for Azerbaijan and Turkey is to expand Azerbaijan's gas export markets and develop the security of Turkey's and South East Europe's energy supply. TANAP aims to effectively ship Azerbaijani gas to Turkey and Europe through natural gas pipeline systems.

The TANAP project, an 1,850 km pipeline, presents 53% of the total 3,500 km of pipeline to be constructed within the Southern Gas Corridor Program. The current cost estimation is about US$8.6 billion. Shareholders have committed to provide TANAP all funds required for the project.

Baku-Tbilisi-Kars Railway

=== Baku-Tbilisi-Kars (BTK) ===
Another investment in the regional railway is Baku-Tbilisi-Kars (BTK). On 25 May 2005, the presidents of Azerbaijan, Georgia and Turkey signed the declaration on the Baku-Tbilisi-Kars railway connection. The objective of the project is to improve economic relations between the three countries and attaining foreign direct investment by connecting Europe and Asia. The Railway project connects Azerbaijan, Georgia and Turkey. According to estimations, the railway line will have the potential to carry 17 million tons of cargo and about three million passengers by 2030. Azerbaijan estimates that the BTK line will bring in $50m a year, becoming a major part of the transportation corridor.

=== Great Silk Road ===
The Great Silk Road (term for the first time was used in 1877 by German geographical scholar Ferdinand von Richthofen) is the caravan route of the ancient times and Middle Ages from China to the countries of Central and Minor Asia. The Great Silk Road was named after the main trade item-silk, which until the 6th century of our era was manufactured only in China.The Great Silk Road brings together two different worlds – the East and the West. Ancient trade routes have passed from China, Japan, India, Mongolia, Iran, Uzbekistan, Tajikistan, Azerbaijan and other countries.Nakhchivan and mainly, Azerbaijan played a significant role in the whole route for centuries.

The Great Silk Road connecting East and West during 2000 years began to restore its historical significance. The road has potential to play a role of bridge as 1000 years ago among different cultures and civilizations. Azerbaijan was one of the main trade and transport junctions of this great road. The country has not lost its geographical position till now, and was one of the initiators of the restoration of the Great Silk Road.

The Azerbaijani people Heydar Aliyev initiated the conference the restoration of the Great Silk Road for the development of transport sector. Representatives as well as presidents from 42 countries participated in the forum. Restoration of the TRACECA program and the Great Silk Road is important in the 21st century. The route starts from the Eastern Europe (Bulgaria, Romania, Ukraine) and also crosses Turkey. From Azerbaijan through the Caspian ferries (Baku – Turkmenbashi, Baku – Aktau) TRACECA route reaches the railway networks of Central Asian countries. Assurance of multilateral development of this program will speed up integration of the South Caucasian and Middle Asian countries into Europe.

The project aims:

- to develop trade and economic relations of the regional states;
- to create necessary conditions for transit transportation;
- to harmonize transport policy;
- to coordinate the connections between transport fields;

== Azerbaijan Investment Holding ==
Azerbaijan Investment Holding (Azerbaijani: Azərbaycan İnvestisiya Holdinqi) is a public legal entity that carries out activities in the field of management of state-owned companies and enterprises. It was established on August 7, 2020.
