= Zabrat Airport =

- IATA: ZXT; ICAO: UBTT

Summary
- Airport type: Public
- Serves: Baku
- Location: Azerbaijan
- Elevation AMSL: 92 ft / 28 m
- Coordinates: 40°29′42.4″N 49°58′37.1″E

Map
- Location of Zabrat Airport in Azerbaijan ZXT/UBTT (West and Central Asia) ZXT/UBTT (Asia)

Runways
Direction	Length		Surface
Direction	m	ft	Surface
16/34	969	3,180	Asphalt
17/35	475	1,560	Grass
- Source: Landings.com

Zabrat Airport (IATA: ZXT, ICAO: UBTT) is a public use airport located 6 nm northeast of Baku, Azerbaijan.

== See also ==
- List of airports in Azerbaijan
