= National Aviation Academy (Azerbaijan) =

Azerbaijani higher education institution

- Milli Aviasiya Akademiyası
- Type: Public
- Established: 15 June 1992; 34 years ago
- Rector: Arif Pashayev
- Location: Mərdəkan pr., 30., Baku, Azerbaijan; 40.45389°N 50.06694°E
- Language: Azerbaijani; Russian; English
- Website: naa.edu.az/az/

National Aviation Academy (MAA, Azerbaijani: Milli Aviasiya Akademiyası) is a public higher education institution of the Republic of Azerbaijan. It is part of the structure of Azerbaijan Airlines Closed Joint Stock Company (JSC). The academy implements higher, additional, and professional specialization training programs in the field of civil aviation.

== History ==
In order to meet the national personnel needs of the Republic of Azerbaijan in the field of civil aviation, the National Aviation Center was established within the "Azerbaijan Airlines" State Joint Stock Company (now called "Azerbaijan Airlines" Closed Joint Stock Company). Decision No. 337 of the Council of Ministers of the Republic of Azerbaijan dated June 15, 1992.

Departments on general technical issues and humanitarian issues were organized within the center. In 1993, the Faculty of Air Transportation Management and the Departments of Aviation Special Equipment and English Language were established at the center.

The National Aviation Center was named the National Aviation Academy by the decision of the Council of Ministers of the Republic of Azerbaijan dated February 24, 1994 and numbered 81.

On May 30, 2012, the National Aviation Academy received the status of regional training center on "Dangerous cargo transportation by air" of the International Air Transport Association (IATA).

The student campus at NAA, consisting of 2 dormitory buildings, football fields, tennis courts, volleyball and basketball courts, was opened for use in September 2014.

In 2016, training for female pilots started for the first time in Azerbaijan.

NAA was accredited by the Ministry of Education of the Republic of Azerbaijan in 2018 for the next 5 years. In the same year, NAA was also certified by the Interstate Aviation Committee and the State Civil Aviation Agency of the Ministry of Transport, Communications and High Technologies of the Republic of Azerbaijan.

In 2019, the National Aviation Academy was certified by DMAA as a training and examination organization for technical service in accordance with the requirements of the Azerbaijan Aviation Regulation (AAQ) "Part 147 Subpart C", and from October of the same year it was certified as "technical-mechanical (B-1) in NAA ) and "aircraft maintenance personnel" program for admission to technical-avionics (B-2) courses.

== Management ==
- Arif Pashayev - Rector
- Adalat Samadov - vice rector for educational affairs
- Afiq Hasanov - vice rector for scientific affairs
- Hajiaga Aliyev - vice rector for aviation affairs
- Shamseddin Akhundov - vice rector for public relations
- Rafig Hasanov - vice rector for general and economic-technical issues

== Composition ==
- Civil Aviation Museum
- Heydar Aliyev Museum
- Pilot Training Center
- "AZAL Training" Aviation Training Center
- Information Technology Center (HC)
- Transport and Aviation Problems Research Institute (ETNAPI)
- International Air Transport Association Institute (IATA)

== See also ==
- Azerbaijan Airlines
- State Civil Aviation Agency (Azerbaijan)
