= List of companies of Azerbaijan =

Location of Azerbaijan

Azerbaijan is a country in the South Caucasus region. The country has an economy that has completed its post-Soviet transition into a major oil-based economy (with the completion of the Baku-Tbilisi-Ceyhan Pipeline), from one where the state played the major role. The government has largely completed privatization of agricultural lands and small and medium-sized enterprises. In August 2000, the government launched a second-stage privatization program, in which many large state enterprises will be privatized. Since 2001, the economic activity in the country is regulated by the Ministry of Economic Development of Azerbaijan Republic.

== Notable firms ==
This list includes notable companies with primary headquarters located in the country. The industry and sector follow the Industry Classification Benchmark taxonomy. Organizations which have ceased operations are included and noted as defunct.

Notable companies Status: P=Private, S=State; A=Active, D=Defunct
Name	Industry	Sector	Headquarters	Founded	Notes	Status	
Azerbaijan Caspian Shipping Company	Industrials	Marine transportation	Baku	1858	National Sea Line	S	A
Azerbaijan Railways	Industrials	Railroads	Baku	1878	National railways	S	A
Medeniyyet TV	Consumer services	Broadcasting & entertainment	Baku	2011	Culture television	S	A
AccessBank Azerbaijan	Financials	Banks	Baku	2002	Micro-finance bank	P	A
AF Holding	Conglomerates	-	Baku	1991	Construction, production, property, retail, tourism	P	A
AF Hotel Group	Consumer services	Hotels	Baku	1991	Hotel chain, part of AF Holding	P	A
Azersu Open Joint Stock Company	Utilities	Water	Baku	2004	Water and sanitation service	S	A
Akkord Industry Construction Investment Corporation	Industrials	Heavy construction	Baku	2005	Construction	P	A
ANS Group of Companies	Consumer services	Broadcasting & entertainment	Baku	1990	News and broadcasting	P	A
AtaBank	Financials	Banks	Baku	1993	Commercial bank	P	A
Azerigasbank	Financials	Banks	Baku	1992	Commercial bank	P	A
Azərpoçt	Industrials	Delivery services	Baku	1999	Postal services	S	A
Azad Azerbaijan TV	Consumer services	Broadcasting & entertainment	Baku	2000	Television	P	A
Azal Avia Cargo	Industrials	Delivery services	Baku	1996	Cargo airline	S	A
Azerbaijan Airlines (AzAL)	Consumer services	Airlines	Baku	1992	National airline	S	A
Azerbaijan International Mineral Resources Operating Company	Basic materials	Gold mining	Baku	2007	Gold production	P	A
Azerbaijanfilm	Consumer services	Broadcasting & entertainment	Baku	1920	Movie production	S	A
Azercell	Telecommunications	Mobile telecommunications	Baku	1996		P	A
Azercosmos	Space industry	Satellite sector	Baku	2010	National satellite operator	S	A
Azerenerji	Utilities	Conventional electricity	Baku	1996	Power distribution	S	A
AzeriCard	Financials	Specialty finance	Baku	1997	Financial services	S	A
Azersun Holding	Consumer Goods	Food products	Baku	1991	Food manufacturing	P	A
AzMeCo	Oil & gas	Exploration & production	Baku	2007	Methanol production	P	A
Azpetrol	Oil & gas	Integrated oil & gas	Baku	1997	Oil and gas stations	P	A
AzQTel	Telecommunications	Fixed line telecommunications	Baku	2005		P	A
AzSamand	Consumer goods	Automobiles	Shamakhi	2005	Automotive	P	A
AzTV	Consumer services	Broadcasting & entertainment	Baku	1956	State-owned broadcaster	S	A
Bahra Biscuit Factory	Consumer goods	Food products	Baku	2006	Food industry	P	A
Baku Carriage Repair Factory	Consumer Services	Transportation services	Baku	1892	Rolling Stock	S	A
Baku Cargo Terminal	Industrials	Transportation services	Baku	2005	Cargo terminal	S	A
Baku Metro	Consumer Services	Transportation services	Baku	1967	Metro	S	A
Baku Shipyard LLC	Industrials	Shipbuilding	Baku	2010	Shipyard	P	A
Bank Respublika	Financials	Banks	Baku	1992	Commercial bank	P	A
Caspian Drilling Company	Oil & gas	Exploration & production	Baku	1996	Petroleum	P	A
Caspian Telecom	Telecommunications	Fixed line telecommunications	Baku	1997		P	A
Central Bank of Azerbaijan	Financials	Banks	Baku	1992		S	A
DekaBank	Financials	Banks	Baku	1989	Commercial bank	P	A
Ganja Auto Plant	Consumer goods	Automobiles	Ganja	1986	Automotive	P	A
Gazelli Group	Consumer goods	Personal products	Baku	1999	Cosmetics	P	A
İctimai Television	Consumer services	Broadcasting & entertainment	Baku	2005	Public television	S	A
Idman Azerbaijan TV	Consumer services	Broadcasting & entertainment	Baku	2009	State-owned sports broadcaster	S	A
Inter Glass	Consumer goods	Durable household products	Baku	2008	Glass products	P	A
International Bank of Azerbaijan	Financials	Banks	Baku	1992		S	A
International Insurance Company	Financials	Full line insurance	Baku	2002		S	A
Kapital Bank	Financials	Banks	Baku	1874		P	A
Lankaran International Airport	Industrials	Transportation services	Lankaran	2008		S	A
Lider TV	Consumer services	Broadcasting & entertainment	Baku	2000	Television	P	A
MDI Azerbaijan	Industrials	Defense	Baku	2005	Arms production	S	A
Nakhchivan Automobile Plant	Consumer goods	Automobiles	Nakhchivan	2006	Automotive	P	A
Nakhtel	Telecommunications	Mobile telecommunications	Nakhchivan	2014		P	A
Nar Mobile	Telecommunications	Mobile telecommunications	Baku	2005		P	A
Park Bulvar	Consumer services	Broadline retailers	Baku	2010	Shopping mall	P	A
PASHA Holding	Conglomerates	-	Baku	2006	Banking, construction, development, insurance, property, tourism	P	A
Region TV	Consumer services	Broadcasting & entertainment	Baku	2014	Regional television	P	A
Shollar water	Consumer goods	Beverages	Baku	1899	Beverage	P	A
Silk Way Airlines	Industrials	Delivery services	Baku	2001	Cargo airline	P	A
SOCAR	Oil & gas	Exploration & production	Baku	1992	State-owned oil and gas	S	A
Sumgayit Chemical Industrial Park	Consumer services	Chemical	Sumgayit	2011	Chemical Industry	P	A
SW Business Aviation	Consumer services	Airlines	Baku	2007	Airline	P	A
Topaz	Consumer services	Gambling	Baku	2011	Bookmaker	P	A
Unibank	Financials	Banks	Baku	2002	Private bank	P	A
Veyseloglu Group of Companies	Consumer staples	Food retailers and wholesalers	Baku	1994	Retail, wholesale, distribution, logistics, manufacturing	P	A
Vinagro	Consumer goods	Distillers & vintners	Baku	2006	Beverage	P	A

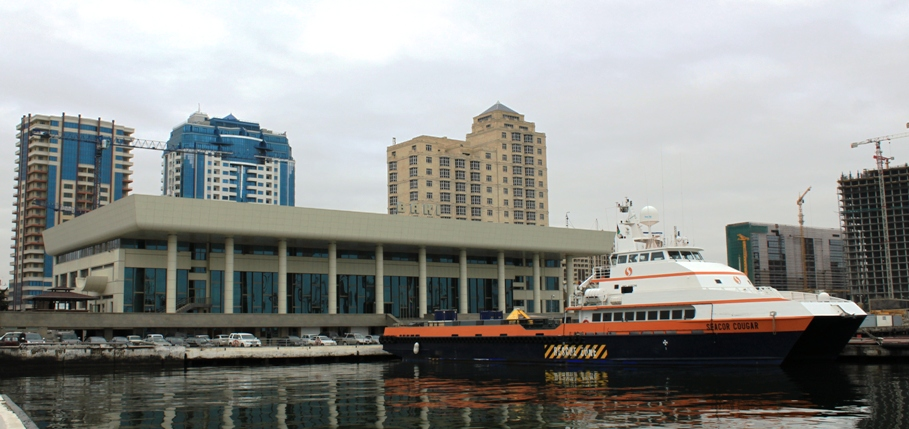
Port of Baku.

Headquarters of Pasha Holding located in Port Baku Towers.

== See also ==
- List of Azerbaijanis
