= AF Group (disambiguation) =

AF Group is a Norwegian engineering company. AF Group may also refer to:

- AF Holding, company in Azerbaijan
- AF Hotel Group, company in Azerbaijan
- Accident Fund, American insurance company
- AF Group (cooperative) (formerly Anglia Farmers), British farm cooperative
