= Food industry in Azerbaijan =

Food industry in Azerbaijan is a branch of industry that processes, prepares, preserves, and packs agricultural raw materials with appropriate methods in the country. Regarding to the volume of industrial production, agriculture (food, beverage, and tobacco) ranked first among the other processing industries.

Olive oil and table olive products processing plant in Zira

== Cannery industry ==
In 2003, the first cannery of the AzerSun Group of Companies—Caucasian Cannery—started its activity in the Khachmaz region.

Recently the new company Bizim Tarla started to produce a variety of products and export them to many countries, including the USA.

== Bakery ==
Production of bread and bakery products is mostly carried out in Baku. There are various bread and pasta factories in Baku: "Aghsu," "Karmen," "Mughan," "Karabakh," and "№1" (Gilan Holding).

== Beverage industry ==
One of the most popular beverages in Azerbaijan is pomegranate juice. In 2009, pomegranate juice named “Grante” (AzNAR, Goychay district) was awarded three gold medals at the 16th international food exhibition “Prodexpo 2009”.

Furthermore, there are many companies specialized in the carbonated and non-gasified water sector: “Shollar”, “TAC”, “Khayal”,”Veyseloglu” and others. In Shahbuz and Nakhchivan, there are two mineral water enterprises: «Badamli», built in 1947, and «Sirab», built in 1950. On October 1, 1999, the "Pepsi-Cola" water production plant was opened in the village of Sulutepe (Baku).

Azersun Holding and Beta Group of Companies account for 62.2% and 32.1% of tea market, respectively. Azerbaijan is popular with Lankaran tea. At the international competition held in Madrid in 2002, Azerbaijani tea was awarded the Gold Prize of Europe. Similarly, in 2005 at the competition «On Quality and Technology» Lankaran tea was awarded a gold medal. Black tea accounts for 98% of tea production in Azerbaijan.

There are wine and cognac factories in Gandja, Goychay, Shamkir, Khanlar, Shamakhi and Nakhchivan. In total, there are 60 brands of wines ("Bayan," "Medrese," "Novruzlu," "Shamkhor," and others). Among 44 enterprises producing alcoholic beverages, 35 of them are focused on producing beer.

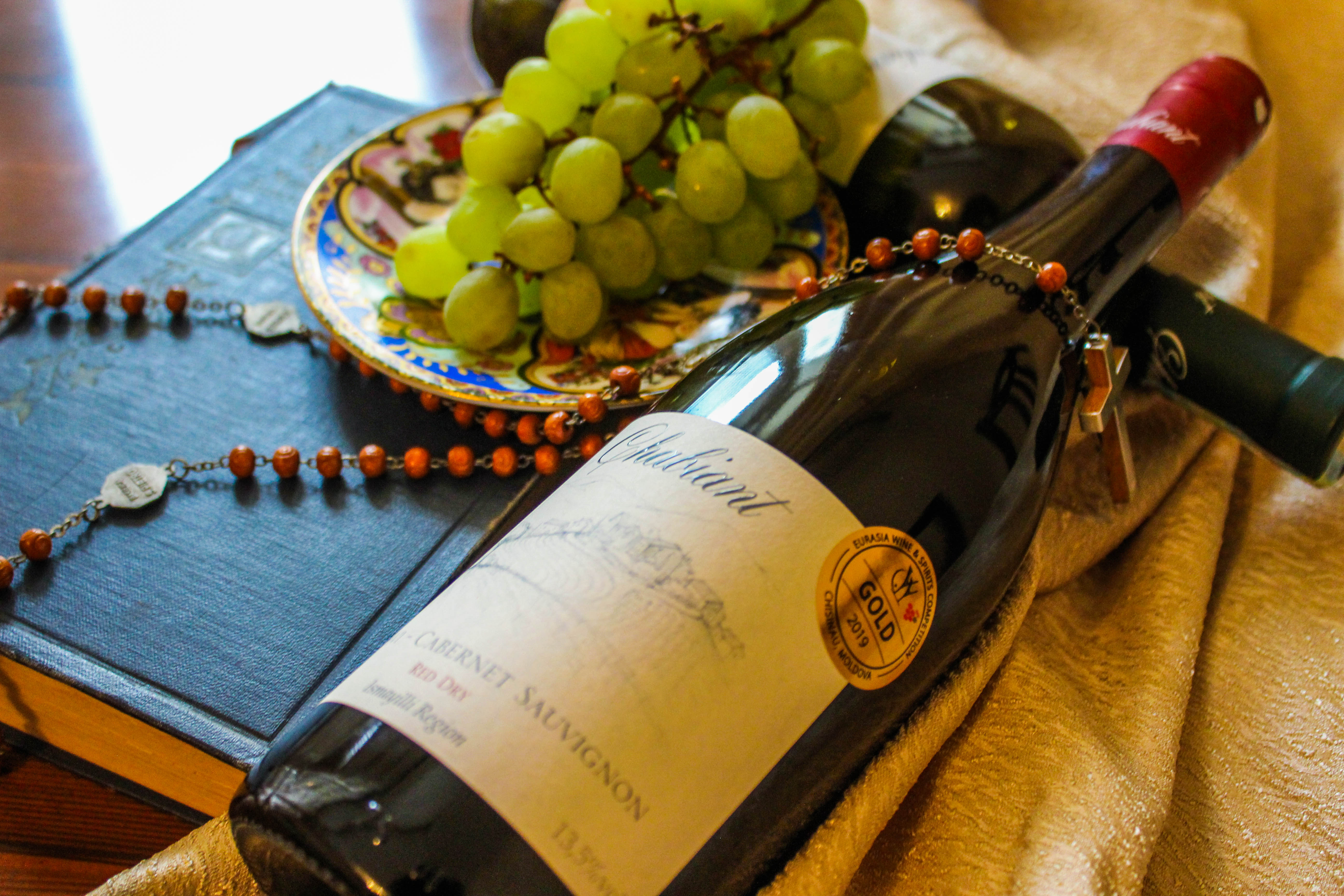
Azerbaijani wine from Chateu Monolit (from Ismayilli region)

== Dairy and livestock industry ==
46% (about 4 million hectares) of the total territory of the country is farmland, half of which is pasture. According to statistics, in 2017, the volume of meat production in Azerbaijan amounted to 316,8 thousand tons. In December 2008 this number was 25,3 thousand tons. According to statistics, meat production in the country has grown by 0.5%. Meat processing is mostly carried out in Baku, Gandja, Sheki, Mingachevir, Nakhchivan, Aghdam, Imishli, Lankaran, and Xirdalan.

Milk processing plants are located in Baku, Sumgait, Gandja, Mingachevir, Lankaran, Xirdalan, Shamakhi, Barda, Zardab, Salyan and Siyazan. There are more than two dozen large milk factories and 128 small dairy enterprises in the republic. In 2008 Palmali Group of Companies opened a dairy factory, "NurSud," in Lankaran. Another milk factory named “Agro” has been operating in the Bilasuvar district.

== Fishing ==
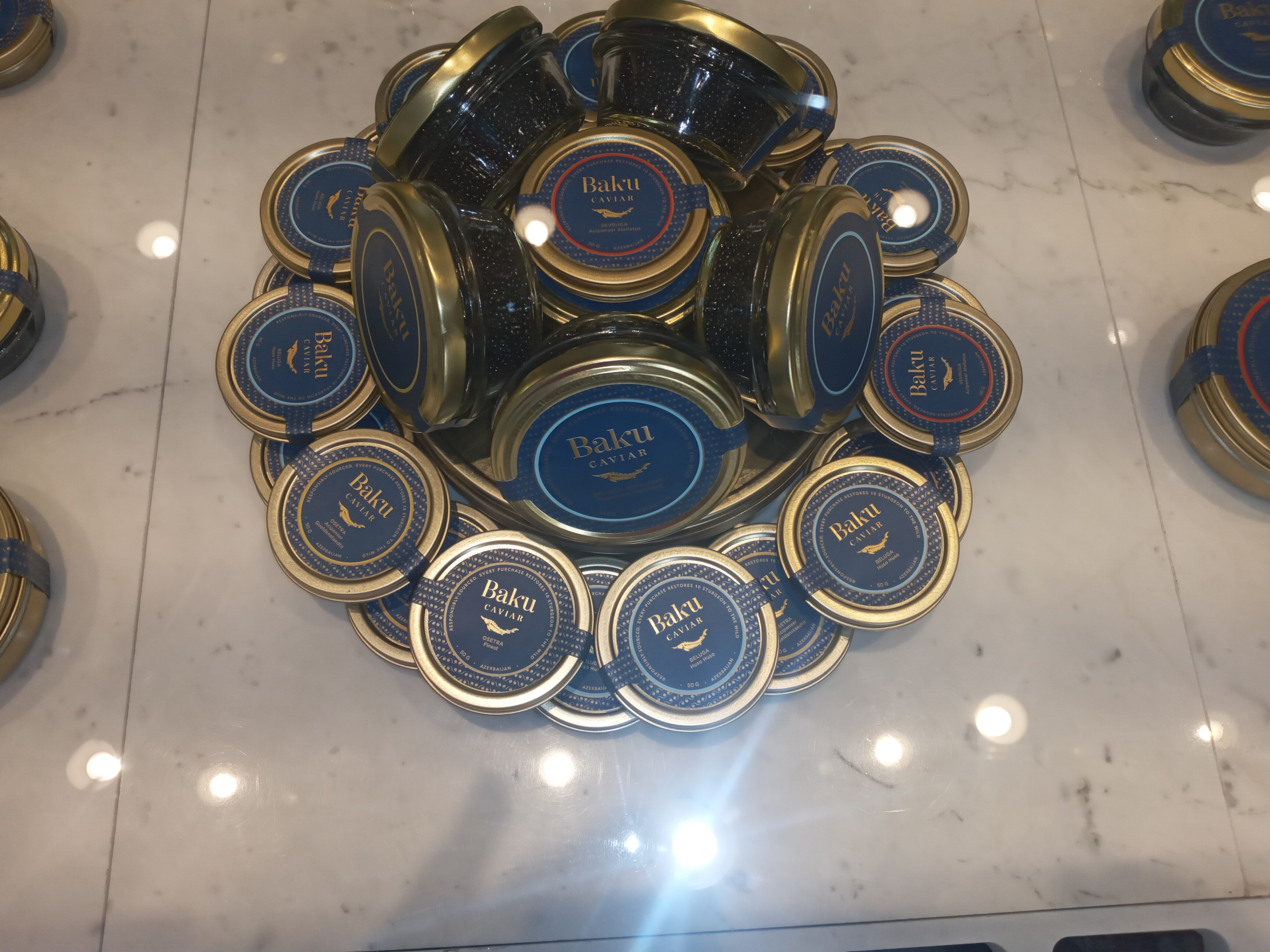
'BELUGA CAVIAR' sold in Baku Caviar Boutique in Baku in Azerbaijan

Fishing is considered an important industry in Azerbaijan. On 25–27 May 2009, the 2nd Caspian International Exhibition «Marine Products and Fishing» was held with the aim of presenting the potential of the Caspian region to international circles engaged in the fishing sector. Fish stocks of the Caspian Sea and the Kura River are operated in Mingachevir, Hajigabul, Hilli, Lankaran, Absheron Economic Region. There are fish breeding plants in the country, most of which are located in the Neftchali region, Khudat, and Hovsan. Azerbaijan has ratified 12 international conventions in this field, after making 120 amendments to the Law «On Fishing».

== Recently established enterprises ==
In recent years a number of enterprises was launched in the food industry. They are indicated below:

Year of establishment	Factory	Production
2003	Caucasus Conserve Plant	Canned beef, jam, compote, caviar, pickle and other canned products
2005	Gabala Canning Factory	Pure juice, concentrate, purées, jams, pickled goods, canned goods
2006	Imishli Sugar Factory	Sugar
2008	Gabala Milk Procession Factory	Dairy products
2012	Tartar Milk Procession Factory	Dairy products
2014	Gilan Food Village in Gabala	Bottled juice, ice tea, lemonade, other soft drinks, sparkling and still water

== Governmental support ==
In 2014 seventy projects were financed by National Support Fund of Entrepreneurship. 57 of them were food production projects.

- 6 logistics centers with a capacity of 152 thousand tons
- 3 specialized green markets, including 3 logistics centers with a capacity of 9 thousand tons and 500 farmer shops
- 5 poultry plants with a capacity of more than 3 thousand tons of meat, 11 million breeding, and 26.4 million marketable eggs
- 6 breeding complexes with 2700 livestock
- 6 large farms
- 9 greenhouses
- 6 bakeries with a capacity of 97 tons per day
- A fruit and vegetable processing factory with a million tons of annual production capacity
- 2 dairy factories with 25 thousand tons of processing capacity
- A flour production facility with annual procession capacity of 22 thousand tons
- 5 gardening farms
- A vineyard
- A tea plantation and tea processing plant

== See also ==
- Food Safety Agency (Azerbaijan)
- Azerbaijani wine
- Vinagro
- Madrasa (grape)
