= Azerbaijan–South Korea relations =

- Azerbaijan: South Korea

Diplomatic mission
- Embassy of Azerbaijan, Seoul: Embassy of South Korea, Baku

Envoy
- Ambassador of Azerbaijan to South Korea Ramin Hasanov: Ambassador of South Korea to Azerbaijan Kang Kym-gu

Azerbaijan–South Korea relations are the bilateral relations between the Republic of Azerbaijan and the Republic of Korea. The two nations share a history of forging partnerships in the post-Soviet era, with formal diplomatic ties established in 1992 following Azerbaijan's independence in 1991. Although there were no direct historical interactions prior to the dissolution of the Soviet Union, the modern relationship between Azerbaijan and Korea has been shaped by both nations' developments in the 20th and 21st centuries. South Korea was one of the first countries to recognize the independence of Azerbaijan.

== History ==
During the Soviet period, Azerbaijan was incorporated into the Soviet Union, and its foreign relations, like those of other republics, were run by Moscow. As a result, there were no direct diplomatic or trade relations between Azerbaijan and Korea. For its part, Korea faced its own challenges, as it remained under Japanese colonial rule from 1910 to 1945 before being split into North and South after World War II. Though Azerbaijan, a part of the Soviet Union during the Korean War (1950–1953), was indirectly involved, no specific ties between Azerbaijan and Korea were formed at that time.

=== Independence of Azerbaijan and establishment of relations ===
Following the declaration of independence of Azerbaijan in 1991 after the dissolution of the Soviet Union, the Republic of Korea officially recognized the sovereignty of Azerbaijan. Diplomatic relations between the two countries were established on March 23, 1992. These relations were built upon mutual interests in political and economic cooperation, especially regarding energy, technology, and infrastructure development.

Despite the geographic distance, Azerbaijan and South Korea have developed a multifaceted relationship characterized by diplomatic, economic, and cultural cooperation. The establishment of formal relations between the two countries in 1992 laid the foundation for further development of ties. However, critical milestones in the 2000s finally cemented their partnership, especially with the opening of the Korean embassy in Baku on March 4, 2006, which became the first South Korean diplomatic mission in the South Cauacsus region, and the establishment of the Azerbaijani embassy in Seoul on March 14, 2007. Moreover, political relations between the two states were boosted by high-level mutual visits. These events not only brought the sides closer in their bilateral relations but also opened new stages of cooperation in different fields.

=== Expansion of bilateral relations (2007–present) ===
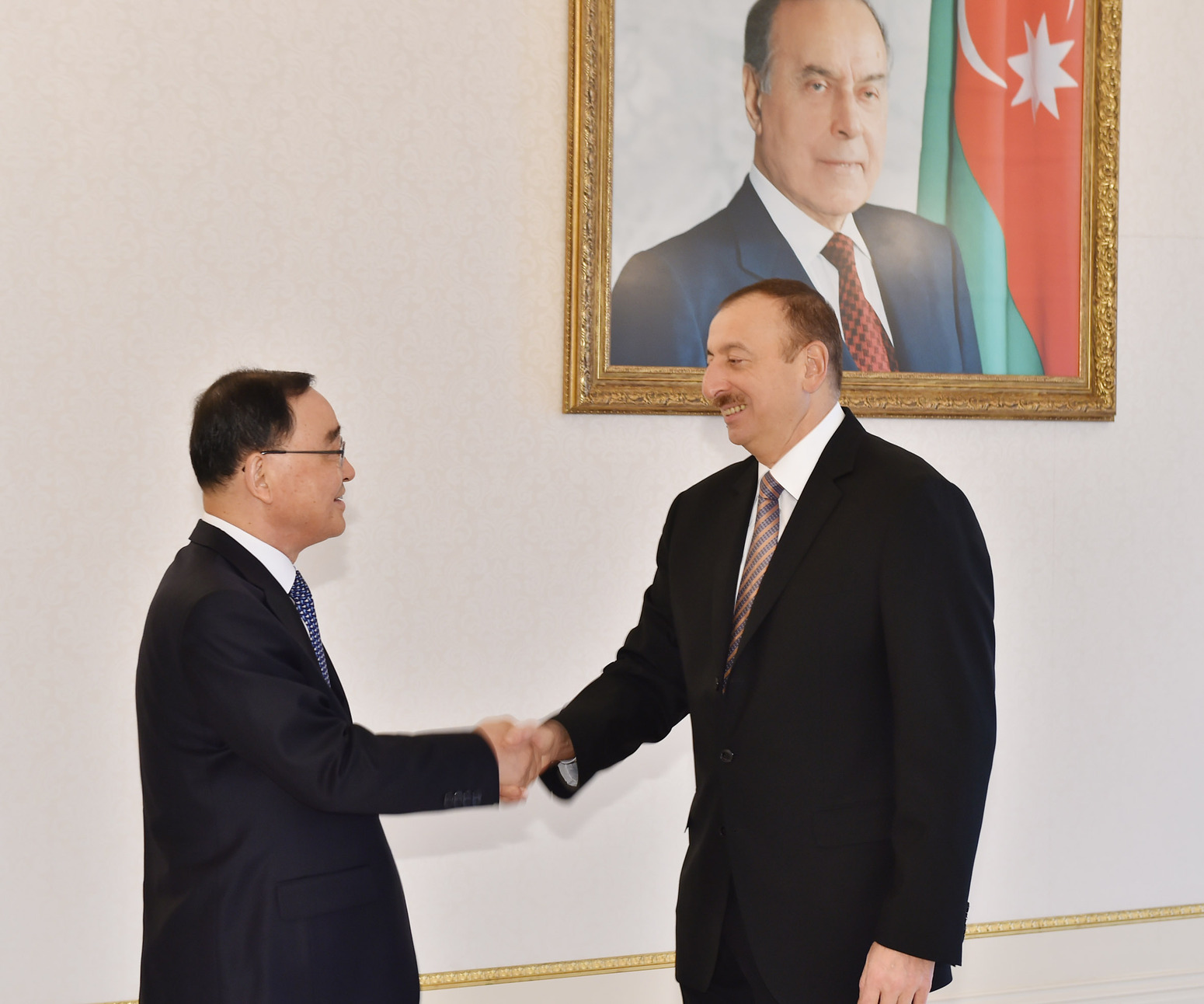
President of Azerbaijan, Ilham Aliyev, receiving a delegation led by the former Prime Minister of South Korea, Chung Hong-won.

Good relations have been established between the legislative bodies of Azerbaijan and South Korea, with many mutual visits taking place within the years. Friendship groups are active in the parliaments of both countries, promoting closer ties and functional cooperation. Overall, the activity of these groups provided for a meaningful political dialogue between the two states and further effective collaboration within different international formats, including the participation of both countries at the Meeting of Speakers of Eurasian Countries' Parliaments and the International Conference of Asian Political Parties.

The political relations between Azerbaijan and South Korea are dynamic. On the one hand, there are multi-level interactions between both countries through diplomatic channels, which reflect the depth and diversity of their cooperation. The scope and content of this relationship in the South Caucasus and the Korean peninsula regions are very extensive, and the diplomatic activity between the two states is rather active in a number of sectors, including trade and economic partnerships, energy projects, cultural and educational exchanges, defense and security collaboration, science and technology support, healthcare assistance, infrastructure development, growing tourism, environmental cooperation, and political dialogue.

== Trade and partnership ==
The Republic of Azerbaijan and the Republic of Korea enjoy active economic and trade relations, while the Republic of Azerbaijan is a large and key economic partner for Korea in the region of the South Caucasus. In the past couple of years, the trade exchange between the two states developed actively: Azerbaijan's export to Korea grew 3.52 times, while its imports from Korea increased by 18.14%. Besides this, Korea is among the largest foreign direct investors in Azerbaijan's non-oil sector, which further cements the economic relationship between the two countries. South Korea's technological expertise and industrial capabilities had become beneficial in Azerbaijan's further efforts toward the modernization of the economy, especially in energy. South Korean companies in construction and electronic industries began to operate in Azerbaijan. Rich oil and gas resources of Azerbaijan attracted the interest of South Korean investments.

=== Economic and diplomatic relations ===
In 2015, the Joint Commission on Economic Cooperation between the Government of the Republic of Azerbaijan and the Government of the Republic of Korea was established to develop bilateral economic, trade, and investment cooperation, as well as "G2G" and "B2B" connections. The first meeting of the Commission took place on June 14, 2016, in Seoul, and the second meeting was held on February 6, 2020, in Baku. The third meeting was held in Seoul on June 7, 2023, having a wide-ranging agenda of multi-dimensional issues. The Commission is co-chaired by the Deputy Minister of Digital Development and Transport of Azerbaijan and the Deputy Minister of Trade, Industry and Energy of South Korea, Jeong Dae-jin.

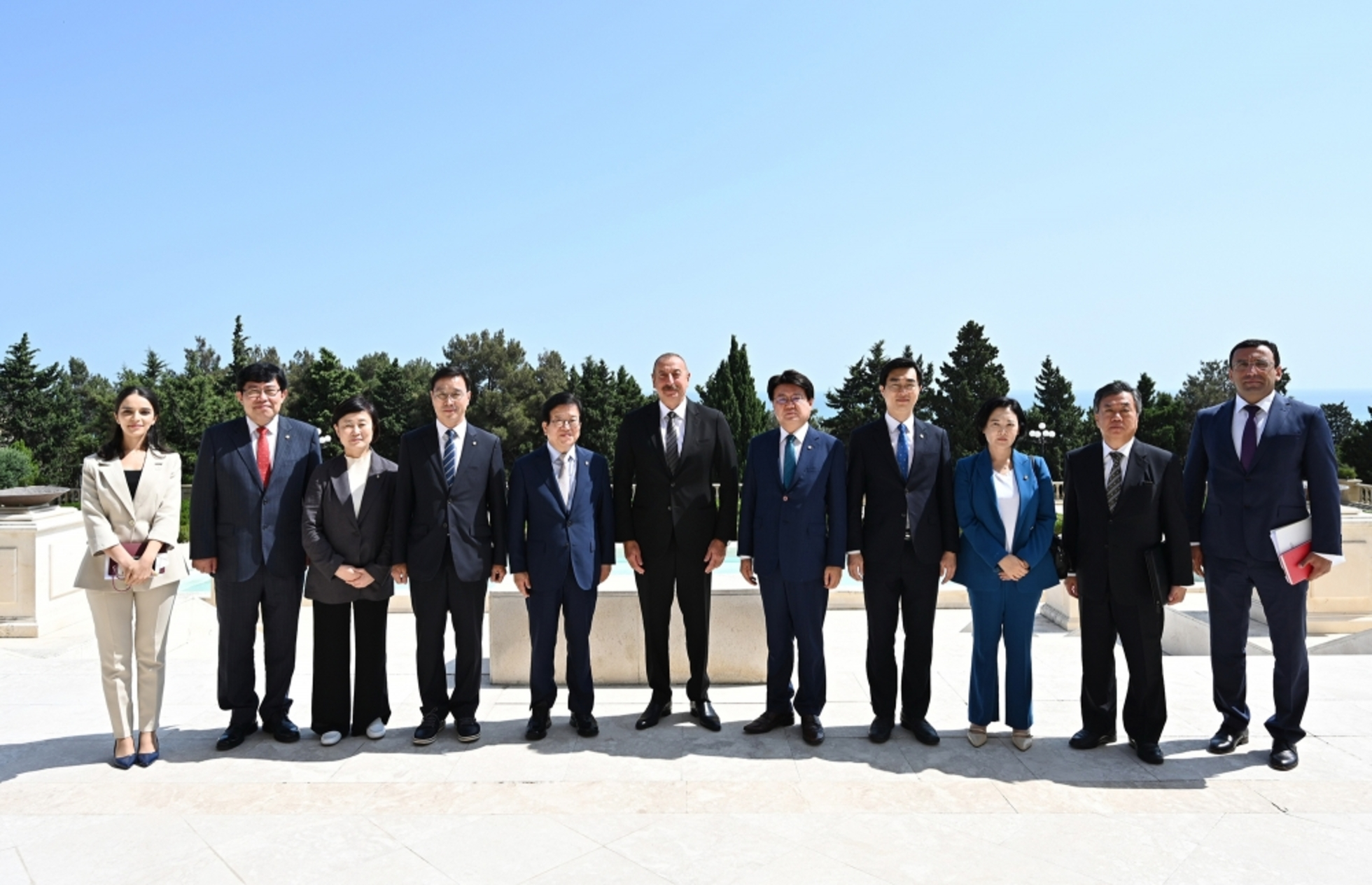
Delegation led by the Speaker of the National Assembly of the Republic of Korea, Park Byeong-seug, in Azerbaijan.

In 2021, a delegation of South Korean diplomats led by the Speaker of the National Assembly of South Korea, Park Byeong-seug, met with the President of Azerbaijan, Ilham Aliyev. Borth parties discussed economic and political matters, and addressed the participation of Korean companies in the reconstruction of areas in the Karabakh region. Ilham Aliyev invited Korean companies to implement projects in the region in hopes of further development for economic and trade relations between the two states.

Multiple meetings between the officials of Azerbaijan and Korea were also made on a diplomatic level as well. Ambassador Ramin Hasanov met with the president of the Korean International Cooperation Agency (KOICA), Chang Won-sam, to discuss the current status and future prospects of development coopartion between two states.

=== Infrastructure and development projects ===
The "New Northern Policy" further facilitated South Korea's increasing involvement in Azerbaijan's modernization efforts, particularly in the energy and infrastructure sectors. South Korean expertise in construction, engineering, and technology proved valuable in Azerbaijan's pursuit of economic diversification and development. South Korean companies, such as Samsung Engineering were involved in large-scale projects, including the development of energy infrastructure. There are currently 82 Korean companies operating in Azerbaijan in the fields of trade, industry, construction and services.

Crescent Development project, in which the Korean architectural services company Heerim Architects & Planners helped with the design of the complex.

In 2013, Samsung won a major contract in Azerbaijan, the first big contract in the country. The South Korean company was to build a fertilizer plant for SOCAR in Sumgayit, located near the capital, Baku. The plant would produce ammonia and urea, with daily outputs of 1,200 tons of ammonia and 2,000 tons of urea for both domestic use and export.

Heerim Architects & Planners is also among many Korean companies credited for their work in Azerbaijani infrastructure, taking part in the construction of the Azersu building, winning the bid in 2012 to build the structure. They are also credited for the design behind the SOCAR Tower building as well as the Central Bank of Azerbaijan tower. Most notably, Heerim came up with the design of the Crescent Development project.

=== Korean car market expansion ===
Over the years, Hyundai and Kia have been steadily taking more and more leading positions in the Azerbaijani market. South Korea's exports to Azerbaijan in the automotive sector are substantial, with land vehicles and parts making up the largest share. In 2023, the value of land vehicle exports from Korea to Azerbaijan reached $319.39 million, accounting for 74.61% of the total exports from Korea to Azerbaijan.

== Educational cooperation ==
The Republic of Korea is one of the favorite destinations for Azerbaijani students seeking higher education. Currently, there are about 200 Azerbaijani students in various Korean universities. The educational support is provided by the Korea International Cooperation Agency (KOICA) and the Korea Development Institute (KDI) to improve academic potential of Azerbaijani students and the capacity of state agency collaborators coming from Azerbaijan.

The Turkish language is one of the strategic languages in South Korea and is taught at Hankuk University of Foreign Studies (HUFS), which also has a Turkish-Azerbaijani Department that operates as a part of the College of Asian Languages & Cultures. Educational programs implemented collaboratively in Azerbaijan include the Korean Culture Center opened at the Azerbaijan University of Languages, a Korea Center opening at Nakhchivan State University, and the Azerbaijan-Korea Information Support Center launched in Baku State University. The university has also developed some Korean studies programs.

A number of agreements on academic and scientific cooperation have been signed between Azerbaijani and Korean universities and research institutes. These agreements included joint degree programs, faculty and student exchanges, summer school programs. One example of that is the partnership agreement signed between the Inha University, which produced 61 Azerbaijani graduates, and the Baku International Multiculturalism Center.

== Environmental cooperation ==
=== Caspian Agro 2024 ===
On May 15, 2024, H.E. Ambassador Lee Eun-yong attended the opening ceremony of Caspian Agro 2024, the regionally significant agricultural exhibition organized in Baku Expo Center, Azerbaijan. Organized from May 15 to 17, the exhibition showed off technologies and novelties in agriculture within the frames of structural changes in diversified economy development of Azerbaijan. He was accompanied by the key Azerbaijani figures, such as Minister of Agriculture Majnun Mammadov, Chairman of the Food Safety Agency Goshgar Tahmazli, and Chairman of KOBİA Orkhan Mammadov. They paid visits to other country pavilions at the exhibition and further promoted cooperation and knowledge exchange in the agricultural field.

Ambassador Lee visited the exhibition booths of several Korean companies, including Baramgaebi Co., Ltd., a manufacturer of fruit and persimmon peeling machines, and Dain Industry, which specializes in agricultural materials for tree care. These companies were part of South Korea's contribution to the exhibition, reflecting the country's advanced agricultural technologies. In addition, two companies from Korea that are collaborating with Azerbaijan's Agricultural and Winemaking Research Institutes were Infro and Wibiz. Infro is focused on deep learning biometric systems and video behavioral analysis systems, while Wibiz specializes in smart irrigation management systems.

=== COP29 ===
The 29th United Nations Conference of the Parties on Climate Change, COP29, held in Azerbaijan, included South Korean diplomats in participation.

The South Korean National Assembly delegation, headed by Representative Na Kyung-won, also took part in COP29. During the visit, the delegation discussed the important role of the legislature in the implementation of the Paris Agreement and in dealing with climate change. Ambassador Lee fully supported the role of the National Assembly and promised to expand cooperation in the areas of response to climate change and the green energy sector.

== Cultural exchanges ==
Cultural exchanges between South Korea and Azerbaijan have flourished since the independence of Azerbaijan, providing valuable opportunities for both nations to share and celebrate their unique cultural traditions. A key aspect of this growing relationship is the mutual participation in performing each other's traditional dances, fostering a deeper understanding and appreciation of their heritage. Traditional cultural events, such as festivals, exhibitions, and performances, are arranged by both sides through Korean and Azerbaijani institutions as very beneficial platforms for sharing traditional cuisine, music, and folklore. These occasions not only provide entertainment but also offer opportunities for workshops and joint projects, allowing participants to deepen their understanding of each other's cultural heritage.

=== Arts and performances ===
Azerbaijan actively organizes cultural events in South Korea in close cooperation with serious organizations, such as the Korea Foundation (KF), the Korea Foundation for International Cultural Exchange (KOFICE), the World Masters Committee and the Asian Culture Center (ACC). These have represented the rich traditions, art, and cuisine of Azerbaijan for further cultural exchange and mutual understanding. At the same time, Azerbaijan participates in various exhibitions and festivals held in South Korea to present its national heritage and promote bilateral cultural relations, actively engaging in offering performances of Azerbaijani dances such as Lezginka and Yalli and presenting the Azerbaijani culture to the Korean public. These dances highlight the energetic footwork and graceful movements of Azerbaijani folk traditions, often accompanied by live music from traditional instruments such as the tar and kamancha.

Korean traditional dance performances in Azerbaijan have been warmly received during different cultural events. Normally, such performances are organized by institutions like the Korea-Azerbaijan Cultural Exchange Association, SEBA, which plays an important role in developing cultural diplomacy between the two countries. The traditional dances of Korean artists, like Fan Dance (Buchaechum) and Ganggangsullae, are performed with rich costumes and rhythmic movements and have deep cultural connotations. Another significant contributor to the creation and development of cultural, social, and diplomatic ties between Azerbaijan and South Korea is the BUTA Azerbaijan-Korea Friendship Association (AKFA), established in 2009, with its head office in Seoul.

== Resident diplomatic missions ==
- Azerbaijan has an embassy in Seoul.
- South Korea has an embassy in Baku.

== See also ==
- Foreign relations of Azerbaijan
- Foreign relations of South Korea
