= Kazakh wine =

Wine making in Kazakhstan

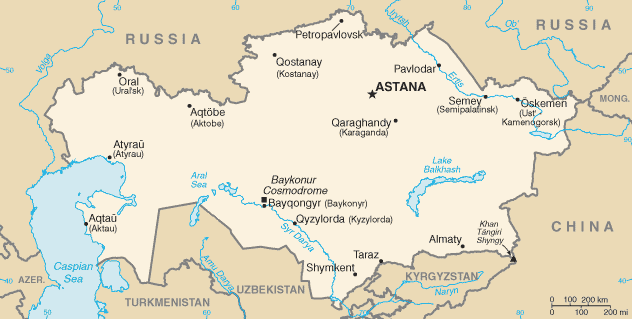
Location of Kazakhstan

Kazakh wine is wine made in Kazakhstan. The roots of the Kazakh wine industry can be traced to the 7th century AD when grapevines were brought to the region from neighboring Uzbekistan and China. While only around 4% of the land in Kazakhstan is ideally situated for viticulture, the country does manage to produce over 6.2 million gallons (236,000 hl) of wine annually from 32,120 acres (13,000 ha). Buoyed by its mineral wealth, the country is an enthusiastic consumer of wine but must import 80% of the 30 m bottles it drinks.

== History ==
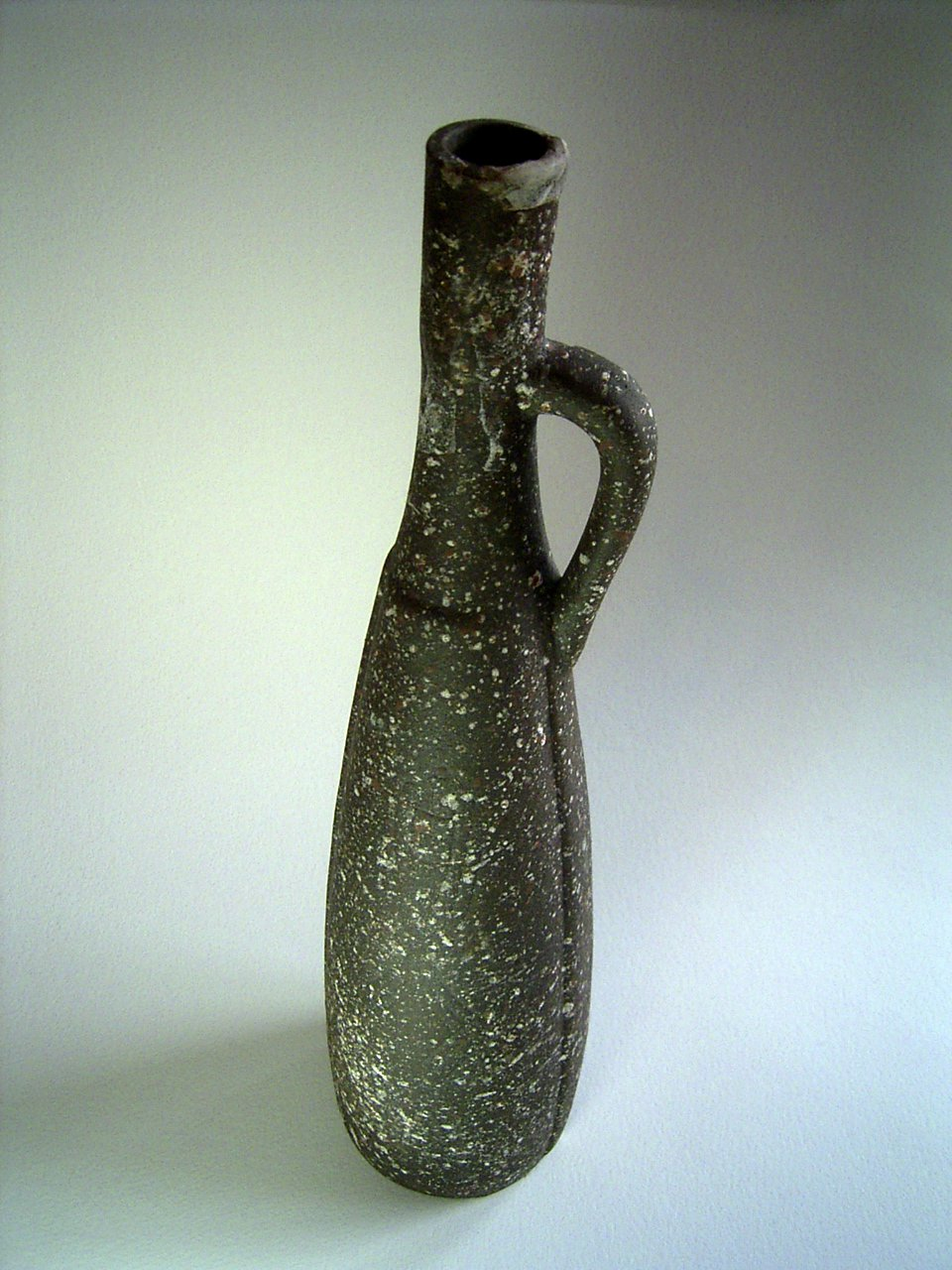
An early Kazakh wine bottle.

The earliest evidence of viticulture in Kazakhstan appear during the 7th century AD around Shymkent and in the foothills of Tian Shan in Almaty Province near the Kazakh-Kyrgyzstan border. Vines were believed to have been introduced to the area by traders from the Xinjiang province of China and the Fergana and Samarqand regions of Uzbekistan. Throughout most of Kazakhstan's history, commercial winemaking was conducted on a small scale. In the early 20th century, state-run vineyards in Almaty, Shymkent and Taraz were the largest producers. Following the dissolution of the Soviet Union, there has been renewed interest in the Kazakhstan wine industry with Russia becoming a leading trading partner in Kazakh wine.

In general the emphasis will be on inexpensive table wine, although the UN thinks that the continental climate may allow the production of high-value ice wine.

== Climate and geography ==
As an inland country, Kazakhstan has a very typical continental climate. Most of the region's vineyards are located in the southern half of the country near the borders of China, Uzbekistan, and Kyrgyzstan with a few smaller regions along the Caspian Sea in the west. Average annual rainfall varies throughout the country ranging from 4-6 inches (100–150 mm) in the wine regions around Atyrau and Aktobe to 27-39 inches (700–1000 mm) in the regions around the Talas River.

== Grape varieties ==
Currently the Kazakhstan winemaking has largely focused on dessert wine production. More than 40 grape varieties are grown in the country though more than half are currently used for table grape production rather than winemaking. Popular wine grape varieties include Aligote, Aleatico, Cabernet Franc, Cabernet Sauvignon, Pinot noir, Riesling, Rkatsiteli, Saperavi, Muscat Ottonel, Bayan Shirey, Kuljinski, Maiski Cherny and Rubinovy Magaracha. In general the grapes are the Georgian ones, such as Rkatsiteli and Saperavi, found in other parts of the former Soviet Union. More recently there has been interest in planting international varieties such as Sauvignon blanc. However local tastes would appear to prefer the traditional sweet red wines.

== Classification ==
At present there is no appellation system in Kazakhstan.

== Wine regions ==
About 80% of the country's wines are produced at the Issyk Winery in Issyk, some 40 kilometres (25 mi) east of Almaty. Bought by the Swiss-based Consulting Group in 1996 and recently sold back to a local company Dostar, it has gone under considerable changes with the help of Italian-based winery Marcato Vini and an Australian consultant. Major reconstruction has been undertaken, with the importation of "New World" technologies including sweeping arm fermenters, air bag presses, cross flow filtration and nitrogen production. It benefits from being 850 m up in the Tian Shan mountains of the southeast of the country. Other wineries include Bakhus and the Turgen Winery. There are 210 hectares of vineyards in the Zailiyskiy region of the Almaty Oblast. In Soviet times there were vineyards and wineries in the Sarkand and Alakol regions of Dzhungar Alatau, in the Almaty Oblast, but these were hit hard by the breakup of the Soviet Union.

== In the popular culture ==
In the movie Borat, Sacha Baron Cohen plays a fictional Kazakh journalist who travels through the United States, and jokingly says that Kazakh wine is made from fermented horse urine.

== See also ==
- Winemaking
- Agriculture in Kazakhstan
