= Agh Shani =

Table grape variety

Ag Shani Ağ şanı
- Grape (Vitis)
- Color of berry skin: Blanc
- Also called: White Shani
- Notable regions: Absheron Peninsula, Azerbaijan
- VIVC number: 11681

Agh Shani (Azerbaijani: Ağ şanı) (also known as agh Shany or white Shani) is a light yellow-skinned white table grape that is grown in various regions of Azerbaijan and in Derbend, Astrakhan and Volgograd, Russia. It has also been exported.

== Origins and specifics ==
Agh Shani is among the 50 varieties of grapes that are indigenous to Absheron Peninsula. By degree of sugar content, Shani is superior to all other Absheron varieties, primarily due to soil and climatic conditions on the peninsula.

The variety is also grown with qara Shani (black Shani) in Mardakan and Bilgah. The shape of the grape is conical, its bushes are winged. Seeds of agh Shani are large and round. Color is light yellow and, when fully mature, the color sometimes turns golden yellow. The skin is medium thick and it has a tough and thin layer of wax. In Mardakan, the seeds of agh Shani start to ripen around August 20, in other parts of Absheron in the first part of September and in Ganja in mid-September.

== Use of Agh Shani ==
According to new plans of the Ministry of Agriculture of Azerbaijan, agh Shani will be one of varieties to be grown extensively in Goygol, Shamakhi, Agsu, Samukh, Qabala, Tovuz, Shamkir, Jalilabad, Kurdamir and Ismayilli raions.

The leaves of agh (white) and qara (black) Shani are extensively used for the cooking of dolma giving a distinctive taste.

== See also ==
- Azerbaijani wine
- Madrasa - grape variety in Azerbaijan and Armenia
- Azerbaijani cuisine
