= Veyseloglu Group of Companies =

Azerbaijani conglomerate

- Native name: Veysəloğlu Şirkətlər Qrupu
- Type: Private
- Industry: Retail, Wholesale, Distribution, Logistics, Manufacturing
- Founded: November 5, 1994; 31 years ago
- Founder: Aydin Talibov
- Headquarters: Baku, Azerbaijan
- Area served: Azerbaijan, Georgia
- Products: Food and non-food products
- Number of employees: 25,000+
- Subsidiaries: Araz, Oba Market, Rossmann Azerbaijan
- Website: www.veyseloglu.az/en

Veyseloglu Group of Companies is an Azerbaijani privately held company operating in retail, logistics, distribution and manufacturing. Founded in 1994, the group operates primarily in Azerbaijan and Georgia.

== History ==
Veyseloglu Group of Companies was founded in 1994 by Azerbaijani entrepreneur Aydin Talibov. His business activity began in 1992 with the wholesale trade of biscuit and confectionery products. On 5 November 1994, the first large-scale import of consumer goods from Türkiye to Azerbaijan was carried out, leading to the establishment of Veyseloglu Distribution. This date is regarded as the starting point of the Veyseloglu Group of Companies.

During the late 1990s and early 2000s, the Group expanded its distribution network across Azerbaijan. In 2001, a regional logistics center was established in Mingachevir, followed by another regional facility in Salyan in 2006. In 2007, the Group opened a professional warehouse in Baku and introduced an automated warehouse system to its supply chain.

The Group entered the manufacturing sector in the early 2000s. In 2001, it established the Ulduz Chocolate Factory, one of the country's major confectionery production facilities. As an investor, the founder also played a role in the restoration of the Sirab mineral water plant, participating in its reconstruction in 2002 following the collapse of the Soviet Union. Since 2023, the Group has also been among the investors in the Badamli mineral water plant, one of the country’s oldest mineral water brands.

In 2010, Veyseloglu expanded beyond Azerbaijan with the establishment of VG, a distribution company operating in Georgia. This marked the Group's first international expansion. The following year, in 2011, the Group entered the retail sector by establishing AzRetail LLC under the Araz supermarket brand, which initially launched with four stores and subsequently expanded its operations nationwide.

In 2014, the Group expanded into the food service sector through an investment that brought the global Entrée brand to Azerbaijan. In 2016, the Group diversified its operations by launching the OBA discount retail chain, which became the first retail chain in Azerbaijan reported to have opened its 1,000th store, and by expanding its manufacturing activities with the establishment of the Khoncha confectionery factory.

In 2017, the Group commissioned one of the largest logistics centers in the Caucasus region and Azerbaijan’s first A+ class warehouse in the village of Mammadli, Absheron District.

In 2022, the Group entered into a partnership with the German drugstore chain Rossmann to open its first stores in Azerbaijan. In the same year, the VIP-PROD factory began operations, producing frozen food products and providing catering services for customers.

In December 2023, Veyseloglu Group of Companies, through its OBA discount retail chain, opened a retail store in Khankendi, which was reported as the first market to begin operations in the city during the post-conflict period.

In 2024, the Asian Development Bank (ADB) approved a financing package of up to $10.5 million to support the expansion of Veyseloglu Group of Companies’ Araz supermarket chain, including investments in logistics infrastructure and new store openings.

By the 2020s, Veyseloglu Group of Companies had diversified its operations across distribution, manufacturing, retail, logistics, and food services.

== Operations ==
Veyseloglu Group of Companies operates in the fast-moving consumer goods (FMCG) sector through distribution, retail, manufacturing, logistics, and food service activities.

=== Distribution ===
Veyseloglu Group of Companies carries out its distribution activities through several subsidiary companies operating in Azerbaijan and Georgia.

Veyseloglu Distribution, a subsidiary of the Group, is engaged in the nationwide distribution of food and consumer goods products across Azerbaijan and represents a number of international manufacturers in the local market, including the LEGO Group. It also distributes products from several international consumer goods manufacturers, including Nestlé, Mars, and Kimberly-Clark.

VG Distribution, operating in Georgia, focuses on wholesale distribution and supplies products to retail outlets across the country, cooperating with regional and international manufacturers.

V-Trade, a subsidiary of the Group, operates in the food sector and specializes in the distribution and import-export of products such as powdered sugar and cereals.

Vesta-Horeca, a subsidiary of Veyseloglu Group of Companies, operates in the HoReCa sector, supplying food products and raw materials to restaurants, hotels, cafes, and catering businesses, including products from manufacturers such as Roshen and Massimo Zanetti.

=== Logistics ===
The Group operates regional logistics centers supporting nationwide distribution across Azerbaijan. Its logistics infrastructure includes a large-scale logistics center and a high-standard warehouse facility located in the Absheron region, as well as cold logistics capabilities supporting the distribution of frozen and fresh food products.

Through the Mammadli Logistics Center, the Group’s logistics operations cover more than 64,000 kilometers daily, enabling the delivery of goods to thousands of customer locations across the country.

=== Manufacturing ===
Manufacturing activities include confectionery, bakery products, and bottled drinking water. The Group operates several production facilities, including the Ulduz Chocolate Factory and the Khoncha Factory.

The Ulduz Chocolate Factory produces confectionery products such as chocolate, caramel, wafer, and dragee products. The factory operates multiple production lines and exports its products to markets in Europe, Asia, and the Middle East.

The Khoncha Factory specializes in the production of frozen bakery products, including bread, buns, cakes, and packaged ready-to-bake goods. Its products are supplied to the Group’s Araz supermarket chain and OBA discount stores, where they are baked in-store and sold to customers through in-store bakery sections. The factory follows a centralized production model, supplying semi-finished frozen products that are baked at retail locations.

The Group also operates VIP-PROD LLC, which produces frozen food products supplied to the Araz and OBA retail chains.

=== Retail ===
Araz supermarket chain is the Group’s primary supermarket format, operating as a nationwide grocery retail network. The chain offers a broad range of food and non-food products, including fresh produce, packaged foods, household goods, and private-label items. Araz stores operate under a standardized store layout and centralized supply model supported by the Group’s logistics infrastructure. As of recent years, Araz operates approximately 400 stores across Azerbaijan and employs more than 12,000 people.

OBA operates as the Group’s discount retail format, focusing on affordability and proximity-based retail. The chain emphasizes a limited assortment strategy, competitive pricing, and neighborhood store locations, primarily serving residential areas. With more than 1,600 locations nationwide, OBA represents one of the largest discount retail networks in Azerbaijan.

Rossmann operates in Azerbaijan through a partnership with Veyseloglu Group of Companies, introducing the German drugstore retail format to the local market. Rossmann stores specialize in personal care, cosmetics, hygiene products, baby care items, and household goods, offering a mix of international and private-label brands. As of recent years, more than 40 Rossmann stores operate across the country.

=== Food services ===
Veyseloğlu Group of Companies operates in the food service sector through the Entrée café chain, which focuses on café-style dining and beverage services. The Group’s food service activities are primarily concentrated in Baku, where Entrée cafés serve both local residents and visitors through dine-in and takeaway formats.

In addition, the Group provides catering services through VIP-PROD LLC.

== Sustainability ==
In 2025, the company became a participant in the United Nations Global Compact. The group is also a signatory to the United Nations Women's Empowerment Principles.

== See also ==
- List of companies of Azerbaijan
- Food industry in Azerbaijan
