= List of ambassadors of Azerbaijan to South Korea =

Ambassador of Azerbaijan to South Korea
- Azərbaycanın Cənubi Koreyadakı səfiri 주한 아제르바이잔 대사
- State Emblem of Azerbaijan
- Incumbent; Ramin Hasanov since August 19, 2022
- Ministry of Foreign Affairs
- Seat: Embassy of Azerbaijan 63, Itaewon-ro 45-gil, Yongsan-gu, Seoul, South Korea
- Appointer: President of the Republic of Azerbaijan
- Term length: Not fixed
- Inaugural holder: Rovshan Jamshidov
- Formation: March 14, 2007
- Website: Embassy of the Republic of Azerbaijan to the Republic of Korea

This is a list of ambassadors of Azerbaijan to South Korea. The Ambassador Extraordinary and Plenipotentiary of the Republic of Azerbaijan to the Republic of Korea is the head of the Embassy of Azerbaijan in Seoul.

Azerbaijani relations with South Korea date back to the early days of Azerbaijani independence, when the Republic of Korea recognized the state on March 23, 1992. The opening of the Korean embassy in the capital city of Baku would take place on March 4, 2006, and the establishment of the Azerbaijani embassy in Seoul on March 14, 2007, which would also be accompanied with the appointment of the first Ambassador Extraordinary and Plenipotentiary of the Republic of Azerbaijan to the Republic of Korea, Rovshan Jamshidov.

== List of ambassadors ==
#	Ambassador	Took office	Left office	Minister of F.A.	Notes
1	Rovshan Jamshidov	March 14, 2007	January 16, 2013	Elmar Mammadyarov	
2	Ramzi Teymurov (Chargé d'affaires)	January 16, 2013	June 27, 2014	Elmar Mammadyarov	
3	Ramzi Teymurov	June 27, 2014	August 19, 2022	Elmar Mammadyarov	
4	Ramin Hasanov	August 19, 2022	Present	Jeyhun Bayramov	

== See also ==
- Foreign relations of Azerbaijan
- Foreign relations of South Korea
