= Azersun Holding =

Azerbaijani conglomerate

Azersun Holding MMC
- Industry: Food manufacturing
- Founded: 1991
- Founder: Abdolbari Goozal
- Headquarters: Azerbaijan
- Revenue: AZN 730 million Azerbaijan Manat ($430 million USD) (2018)
- Total equity: AZN 279 million Azerbaijan Manat ($164 million USD) (2018)
- Website: azersun.com

Azersun Holding MMC (Azerbaijani: Azərsun Holdinq MMC) is an Azerbaijani conglomerate that operates in the food production, retail, and farming sectors primarily in Azerbaijan but also in other CIS countries and the Middle East. Azersun is the largest food producer and exporter in Azerbaijan (with 28 food brands produced) and also engages in the trade of paper and packaging.

The company does not publish information about its ownership, but Abdolbari Goozal is listed on the company's website as founder and owner.

== History ==
Shortly after the Soviet Union collapsed, the former socialist countries, including Azerbaijan, have geared their economies towards integration into a free market economy. Obsolete technologies and floundering industrial units, inherited from the system of centralized socialist economy, did not meet the requirements of the free market economy. Many of them had to close down due to changing market conditions, while the others could maintain only half of their production capacities. The transition process brought severe unemployment and recession climate in the country. Right until 1993, Azerbaijan had practically no enterprises operating in the food manufacturing industry. Around this time, the government laid down a new policy of privatization of industrial units. The influx of foreign investment, drawn in the country's economy, saw a sudden increase in the early 90s. Mr. Abdolbari Goozal happened to be among those foreign businessmen interested in investing in Azerbaijan. Shortly after his first visit to Azerbaijan, he opened his first local branch office in Azerbaijan. As a result of successful activities, this office later expanded into a leading group of companies in the food sector. Azersun Holding has been the first foreign private company in Azerbaijan's food industry to incorporate several enterprises under its control, pioneering the concept of a group of companies in the country. In 1996, they established their trading company in Dubai.

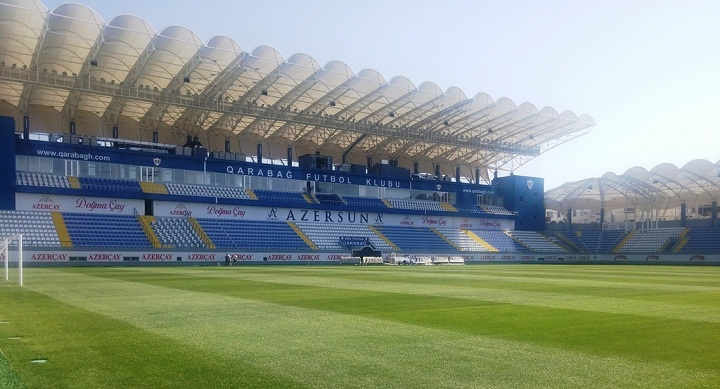
Azersun Arena

== Acquisitions and subsidiaries ==
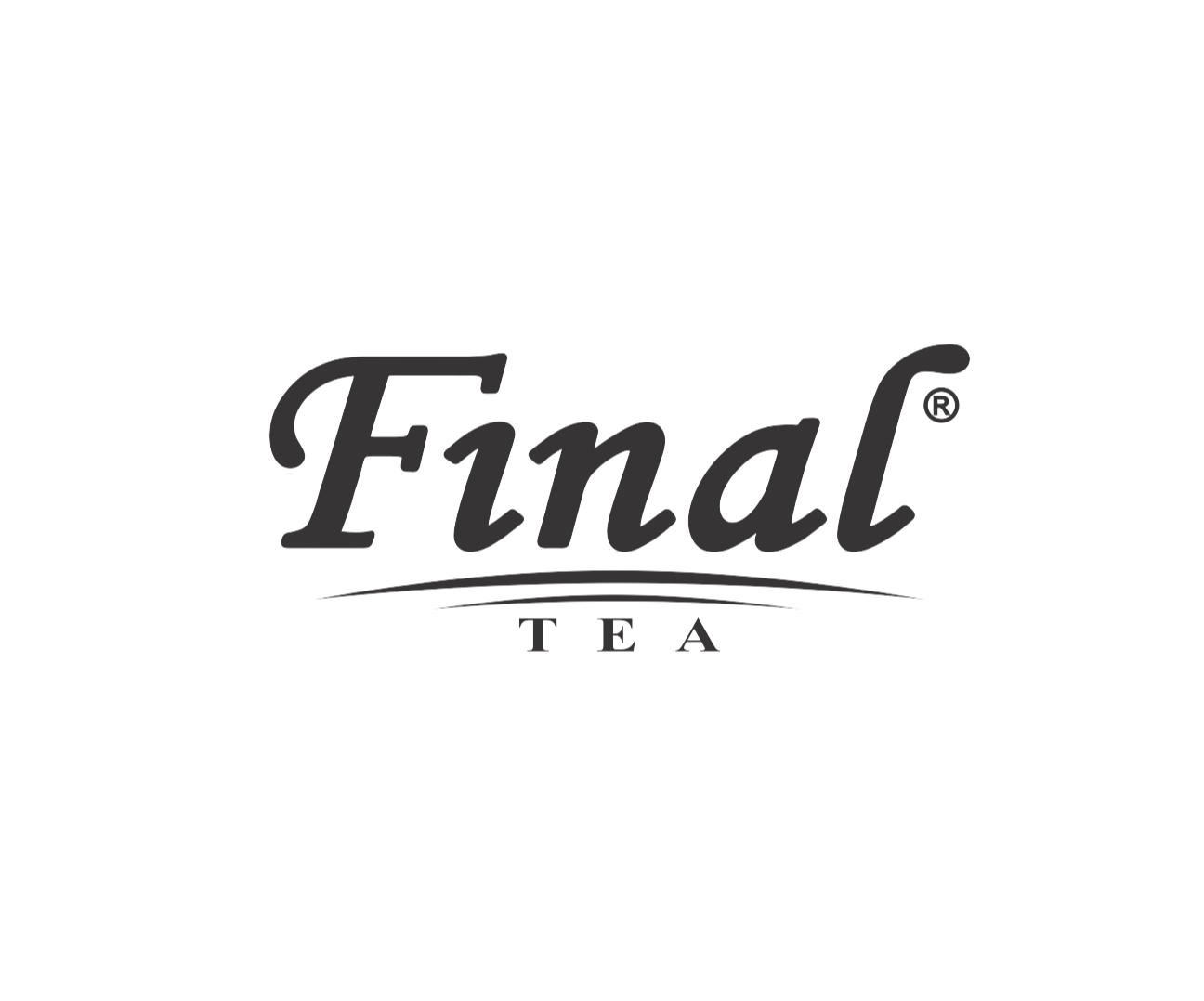
Azersun’s FINAL Tea Brand

Subsidiaries of Azersun include:

- Sun Tea Çay Fabriki - tea factory purchased in 1994
- Bakı Qida və Yağ Fabriki - edible oil factory purchased in 1995
- Azerbaijan Industrial Insurance - OJSC established in 1996
- Zeytun emalı Fabriki - paper factory purchased in 1997
- Azərbaycan Kağız Karton Istehsalat Kombinati - cardboard factory purchased in 1997
- Qida Paketləmə Müəssisəsi - food processing factory purchased in 1998
- Zeytun Emali Fabriki - olive processing factory purchased in 2002
- Qafqaz Konserv Zavodu - canned food factory purchased in 2003
- Qafqaz Metal Qablaşdırma Sənaye - metal packaging factory purchased in 2005
- Zaqatala Fındıq Fabriki - Hazelnut factory purchased in 2006
- Azərbaycan Şəkər İstehsalat Birliyi - Azerbaijan's largest sugar refiner purchased in 2006
- Natural Green Land - edible oil factory established in 2006
- Qənd İstehsalı Fabriki - sugar producer purchased in 2009
- Azərbaycan Duz Istehsalat Birliyi - salt factory purchased in 2010
- Qazax Konserv Zavodu - canned food factory purchased in 2012
- Green Tech Istixana Kompleksi - vegetable products company purchased in 2012
- Kürdəmir Süd Kompleksi - dairy purchased in 2013
- Sumyagit Yag Fabriki - edible oil factory purchased in 2014
- 26% interest in pharmaceutical manufacturer Caspian Pharmed CJSC with Tamin Pharmaceutical of Iran (49%) and Azerbaijan Investment Company (25%), liquidated in 2021

== See also ==
- List of Azerbaijani companies
- Food industry in Azerbaijan
