= Ramin Hasanov =

Azerbaijani diplomat (born 1977)

- Ramin Həsənov

Azerbaijan Ambassador to South Korea
- Incumbent
- Assumed office August 19, 2022
- Appointed by: Ilham Aliyev
- Preceded by: Ramzi Teymurov

Azerbaijan Ambassador to Germany
- In office September 7, 2016 – August 19, 2022
- Appointed by: Ilham Aliyev
- Preceding: Nasimi Aghayev
- Preceded by: Parviz Shahbazov

Personal details
- Born: November 7, 1977 (age 48)
- Children: 2
- Education: Baku State University

Ramin Muzaffar oghlu Hasanov (Azerbaijani: Ramin Müzəffər oğlu Həsənov; born November 7, 1977) is an Azerbaijani diplomat, who is the current Ambassador Extraordinary and Plenipotentiary of the Republic of Azerbaijan to the Republic of Korea. Before, he was the Ambassador Extraordinary and Plenipotentiary of the Republic of Azerbaijan to the Federal Republic of Germany.

== Life ==
He completed secondary education in 1994. From 1994 to 1998 he studied for a bachelor's degree at the International Relations and International Law Faculty of Baku State University. From 1998 to 2000 he continued his study for a master's degree at the same faculty and in 2000 obtained a master's degree in international law. In 1999, he attended the courses for international diplomats organized by the Ministry of Foreign Affairs of Germany.

Ramin Hasanov speaks Azerbaijani, German, English, Russian and Turkish. He is also married and has two children.

== Diplomatic career ==
Ramin Hasanov started his diplomatic service in 1999. From 1999 to 2000, he served as a desk officer and attaché at the Europe and Canada Department of the Ministry of Foreign Affairs of the Republic of Azerbaijan. Between 2000 and 2003, he worked as an attaché and third secretary at the Embassy of the Republic of Azerbaijan in Germany. He later served as a third and second secretary at the First Western Territorial Department of the Foreign Ministry, followed by a role as a second secretary at the International Law and Treaties Department of the Ministry of Foreign Affairs of the Republic of Azerbaijan.

From 2005 to 2009, he served as a second secretary, first secretary, and then as a counsellor at the Embassy of the Republic of Azerbaijan to the Swiss Confederation and the Principality of Liechtenstein. He then became head of division in 2009, and from 2010 to 2013, a deputy-director at the International Law and Treaties Department of the Ministry of Foreign Affairs of the Republic of Azerbaijan. In 2013, he was appointed Director of the International Law and Treaties Department, serving in this position until 2016.

Ramin Hasanov represented Azerbaijan in numerous bilateral and multilateral events as part of official delegations. From September 7, 2016, to August 19, 2022, he was the Ambassador Extraordinary and Plenipotentiary of the Republic of Azerbaijan to Germany. By an order of the President of the Republic of Azerbaijan on August 19, 2022, he was appointed the Ambassador Extraordinary and Plenipotentiary of the Republic of Azerbaijan to the Republic of Korea.

On July 24, 2009, he was awarded the medal of the 90th anniversary of diplomatic service organs of the Republic of Azerbaijan. By an order of the President of the Republic of Azerbaijan on July 7, 2012, he was awarded the medal of "Distinguished Diplomatic Service." On July 9, 2019, he was granted the diplomatic rank of Ambassador Extraordinary and Plenipotentiary.

== Activities ==
Ambassador Ramin Hasanov visited Busan on September 21–22, 2023. During the visit, a luncheon meeting was held with Mr. Kang Chul-ho, Chair of the Busan Metropolitan Council, and Mr. Shin Chae-Hyun, Ambassador for International Relations of Busan Metropolitan City. They discussed matters of mutual interest. Additionally, Ambassador Hasanov participated in the 24th World Knowledge Forum, titled “Next Generation ESG: Beyond Threats Toward New Opportunities,” held on September 21, 2023, in Busan, which was organised by Maekyung Media Group.

On April 8, 2024, Ambassador Ramin Hasanov visited Daejeon Metropolitan City. During the visit, he met with Dr. Jang Woo Lee, Mayor of Daejeon Metropolitan City, to discuss matters of mutual interest, including the sister city partnership, the promotion of people-to-people contacts, and cultural exchanges. Ambassador Hasanov also held a meeting with Dr. Jeong Tae Hee, President of the Daejeon Chamber of Commerce & Industry, where they explored economic and trade cooperation prospects, as well as investment opportunities in Azerbaijan's territories liberated from Armenian occupation. Additionally, he visited the Korea Advanced Institute of Science and Technology (KAIST) and engaged in discussions with Prof. Dr. Kwang Hyung Lee, President of KAIST, and Prof. Dr. Man-Sung Yim, Vice President of KAIST, on academic, scientific, and R&D collaboration prospects with Azerbaijani universities and industrial clusters. As part of his visit, Ambassador Hasanov conducted an interactive meeting with Azerbaijani students studying at the university. The Embassy also arranged a mobile consular service for Azerbaijani students at KAIST.

On May 8, 2024, a lecture on the political legacy of Heydar Aliyev was held at Gachon University. Ambassador Ramin Hasanov delivered a speech to students of the Department of Political Science and Security Studies on the topic “National Leader Heydar Aliyev’s Political Legacy – Azerbaijan’s Strategic Priorities and Development Model.” As part of the lecture, a documentary film dedicated to Heydar Aliyev was screened.

On October 16, 2024, in Seoul at the Road to 2024 United Nations Climate Change Conference conference organized by the Global Green Growth Institute (GGGI), Ramin Hasanov, spoke about the country's role in hosting and chairing COP29 in November 2024. He emphasized that this trust in Azerbaijan highlights the country's readiness to lead the global climate agenda. Hasanov stressed that Azerbaijan prioritizes environmental security, eco-sustainability, and green growth. The Ambassador highlighted the urgent need for global cooperation on climate change, which he described as a real and present threat to billions of people worldwide. He reiterated that the time for action is now, with coordinated efforts needed to limit global temperature rise to 1.5 °C. Azerbaijan is committed to delivering COP29 in a transparent, inclusive way and fostering collaboration among countries. The conference was also attended by Alanoud Alhaj Al Ali from the UAE’s Ministry of Climate Change and Environment, who discussed ongoing negotiations for COP29 and COP30 and the creation of a Loss and Damage Fund to assist countries facing climate impacts. The event featured climate experts and officials who called for immediate action to reduce harmful emissions and increase support for vulnerable nations. Ramin Hasanov also participated in panel discussions at the 2024 United Nations Climate Change Conference titled "Road to COP29 - What's at Stake in Baku, Azerbaijan?" organized by the Global Green Growth Institute (GGGI). During the discussion, Hasanov provided information on matters related to COP29, highlighting Azerbaijan's role and the importance of the upcoming conference.

Ramin Hasanov attended the Evening of Friendship, hosted by the Daegu-Gyeongbuk International Exchange Association (DGIEA) On December 2, 2024. During the event, Ambassador Hasanov delivered a congratulatory speech, expressing his best wishes for the Korea-Azerbaijan Association, a member of DGIEA, and its future endeavors to strengthen the cultural ties between Azerbaijan and Korea. In addition, the Ambassador held a meeting with members of the Korea-Azerbaijan Association, discussing ways to further enhance the cultural and diplomatic relations between the two countries.

On February 20, 2025, Ambassador Ramin Hasanov visited Gyeongju, the sister city of Azerbaijan's Qabala. During the visit, he met with Dr. Joo Nak Young, Mayor of Gyeongju, Mr. Lee Sang Geol, Chairman of the Gyeongju Chamber of Commerce & Industry, and Mr. Kim Nam Il, President of the Gyeongsangbuk-do Culture & Tourism Organization. Their discussions focused on fostering mutually beneficial intercity and interregional cooperation.

On February 28, 2025, the Second Symposium on the Khojaly Genocide took place on December 2, 2024, in Seoul, organized by the Embassy of the Republic of Azerbaijan, the Korea-Azerbaijan Association of Daegu-Gyeongbuk, and EdunietyLab of Korea. The event brought together ambassadors, embassy representatives, scholars, journalists, and key figures involved in the cultural and academic exchange between Korea and Azerbaijan. The symposium commemorated the tragic events of February 25–26, 1992, when Armenian forces, assisted by the Soviet Union's 366th Guards Motor Rifle Regiment, launched an attack on Khojaly, a city in Azerbaijan's Karabakh region. The assault led to the forced displacement of over 5,000 people, the deaths of 613 civilians, and the disappearance of 150 hostages, whose fate remains unknown. This event is recognized as one of the most brutal acts during the Nagorno-Karabakh conflict. Ambassador Ramin Hasanov addressed the attendees, highlighting the importance of remembering the Khojaly genocide both as a tribute to the victims and a call for justice. He mentioned that some individuals responsible for the genocide are currently facing legal trials and emphasized Azerbaijan's success in the Second Nagorno-Karabakh War, which helped restore sovereignty over previously occupied territories. The Ambassador also called for international accountability for the crimes committed. The symposium included several panel discussions condemning the Khojaly massacre and honoring its victims. Lim Myeong-mook, a master's student at Seoul National University, shared his experiences from a recent visit to Azerbaijan, where he witnessed efforts to preserve the country's historical memory. Conversations also focused on peace and cooperation in the South Caucasus, with an emphasis on Korea's potential role in supporting regional stability. Experts like Professor Oh Chong-jin from Hankuk University of Foreign Studies and Oh Young-sub from Inha University talked about the growing interest in Azerbaijan in Korea and the country's rich multicultural traditions. Yoo Su-jin, an award-winning Korean novelist, also shared her experience of translating Azerbaijani folklore into Korean. The event concluded with a collective call to recognize the Khojaly tragedy as genocide and to continue building stronger bilateral ties between Korea and Azerbaijan through cultural, academic, and diplomatic collaboration.

== See also ==
- Azerbaijan–South Korea relations
- Germany–Azerbaijan relations
