= Azerbaijani wine =

Wine making in Azerbaijan

Vineyards of Azerbaijan
- Wine region
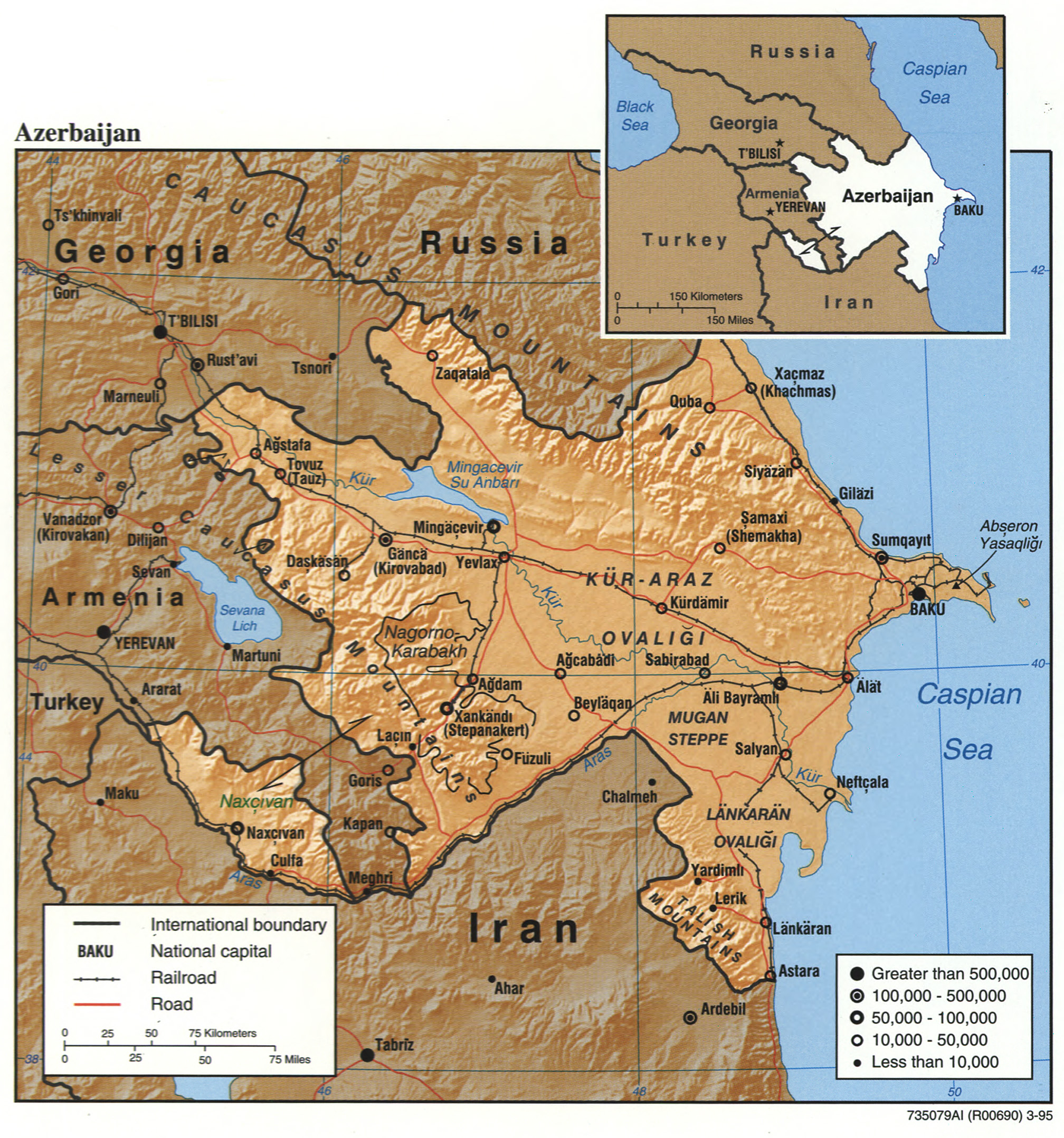
- Other names: Azerbaijani Wine
- Country: Azerbaijan
- Sub-regions: Kur-Araz Lowland; Caucasus Mountains
- Growing season: Cold dry, rainy or snowy winters Warm, dry, sunny summers
- Climate region: Continental
- Heat units: Region III, IV, V
- Precipitation (annual average): 250mm-600 mm
- Total area: 86,600 km^{2} (33,000 sq mi)
- Size of planted vineyards: 6,062 km^{2} (2,000 sq mi); Ranked 6th
- Varietals produced: Vitis vinifera, Pinot noir, Rkatsiteli, Pinot blanc, Aligoté, Madrasa
- Wine produced: 7,200 tons (2007)

Azerbaijani wine is produced in several regions throughout Azerbaijan. Before 20th century communist rule, the region which makes up modern-day Azerbaijan had produced wine since the second millennium BC. The territory of modern-day Azerbaijan has a long history of wine production, that was rediscovered at archaeological digs of settlements in Kültəpə, Qarabağlar

Since the fall of Communism and the restoration of Azerbaijani independence, ardent attempts have been made to revive and modernize the Azerbaijani wine industry. Today, vineyards are found in the foothills of Caucasus Mountains as well and the Kur-Araz lowlands near the Kura River. In the 21st century, Ganja, Nakhchivan, and the separatist region of Nagorno-Karabakh controlled by the self-proclaimed Republic of Artsakh have emerged as centers of wine production in the region. Among the grape varieties used to produce Azerbaijani wine include Pinot noir, Rkatsiteli, Pinot blanc, Aligote and Matrassa. Local grape varieties indigenous to Azerbaijan and neighbouring regions include White Shani, Bayanshire and Madrasa.

== History ==
In Goygol Rayon of the country, archeologists have found jars with remains of wines which date back to the second millennium BC.

The culture of wine-making was enriched with the arrival of German immigrants to Tovuz in the early 19th century. German immigrants from Württemberg were settled in Azerbaijan by the Russian tsar Alexander I circa 1817-1818 and enhanced the wine and cognac producing potential of the country by heavy investments into the industry. Famous German family businesses such as Vohrer Brothers and the Hummel family based in Helenendorf industrialized the wine production, making it competitive with European wines.

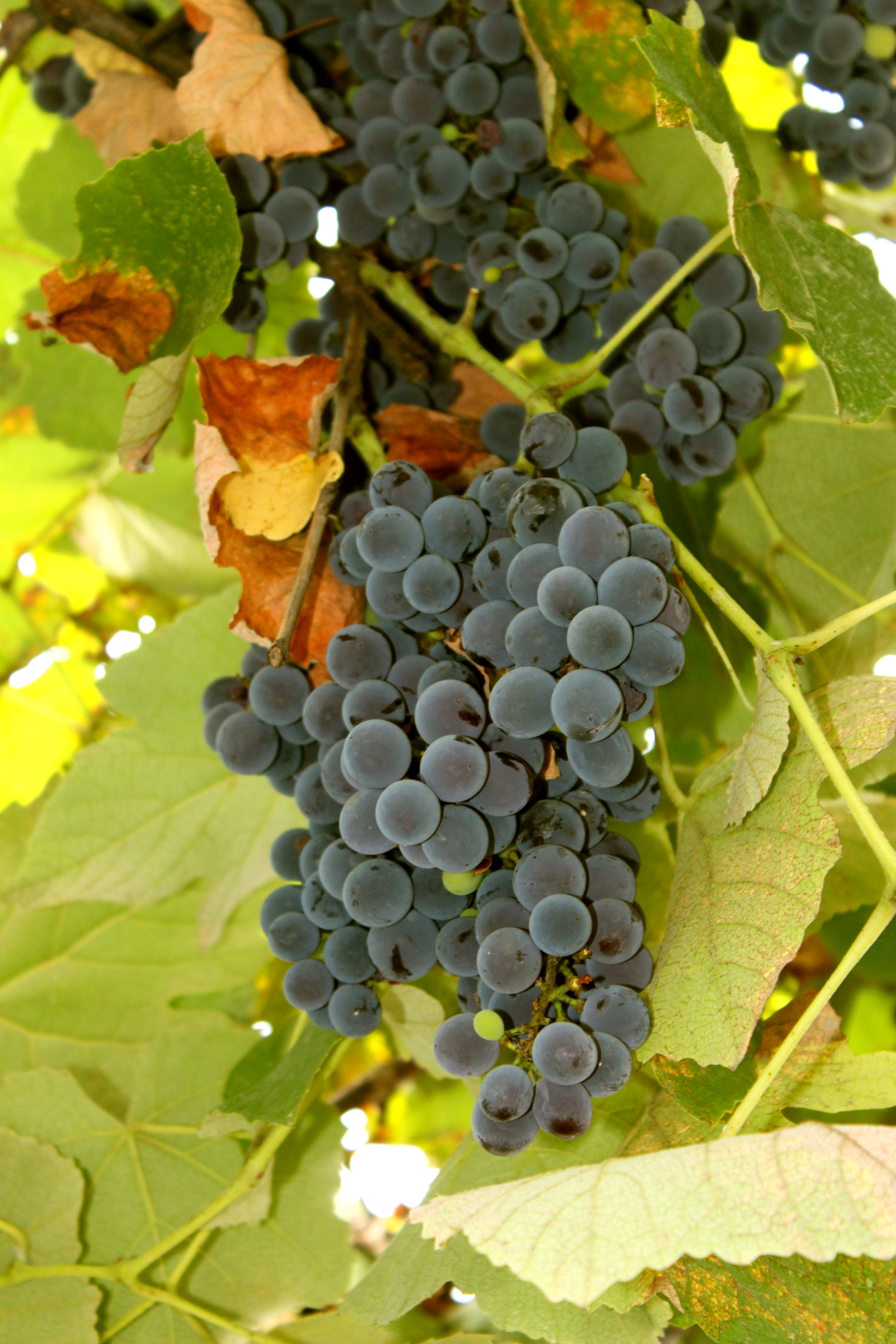
Pinot noir has been widely used throughout Azerbaijan for wine-making

=== Modern times ===
The contemporary wine-making in Azerbaijan is seen in Ganja-Qazakh and Shirvan economic zones. Vineyards in these regions account to about 7% of the country's cultivated land. The regions are famous for 17 vines and 16 table grape varieties, the most common of the wine cultivars being Pinot Noir.

Azerbaijan is one of the main wine producers in the Caspian Sea region. Contemporary wine-making was ambitiously developed during the 1970s by Soviet authorities, who preferred to increase the wine production versus development of the grain industry. As per special decrees of the Cabinet of Ministers, more funds were allocated for the industry, setting between 70 and 80 thousand hectares of land for vineyards. The initial plans were to produce as much as 3 million tons of grapes annually by 1990. Due to increased productivity, Azerbaijan was producing nearly 2.1 million tons of grapes by 1982. The industry brought about 100 million rubles annually. Most of the wines produced in Azerbaijan during Soviet rule were exported to Russia, Belarus, and the Baltic, however, during the 1980s export was slowed due to Gorbachev's alcoholism prohibition campaign.

Currently, there are nearly 10 wineries and vineyards producing wine in the country. The largest one is Vinagro, created in 2006. It uses the Goygol Wine Plant near Ganja founded in 1860 by German immigrants. Exports to other countries are steadily growing due to good quality of Azerbaijani wine products. Most of the produce is currently being targeted for Russian and European markets, as well as new growing markets for Azerbaijani wine such as China. Due to growing demand, new grape plantations have been set up over 100 hectares in Shamkir region of Azerbaijan. Azerbaijan has been increasing its wine production for the last several years. In 2003, it produced 3,790, in 2005 - 4,005 and in 2007 - 7,200 tons of wine.

In 2012, Azerbaijani president, Ilham Aliyev, approved a decree "State Program for development of grape growth 2012-2020". The aim of the program is to increase the grape growth as well as develop winemaking, and rise the rate of exportation. Each year, the size of the territories for growing grape is rising. Within the state program, territory of grape gardens will be 50 thousand hectares. It is expected that the grape growth will reach to 500 tons until 2020. 30% of grape is considered to be consumed for eating. The rest of the crop will be used to produce various brands of wine.

== Climate and geography ==
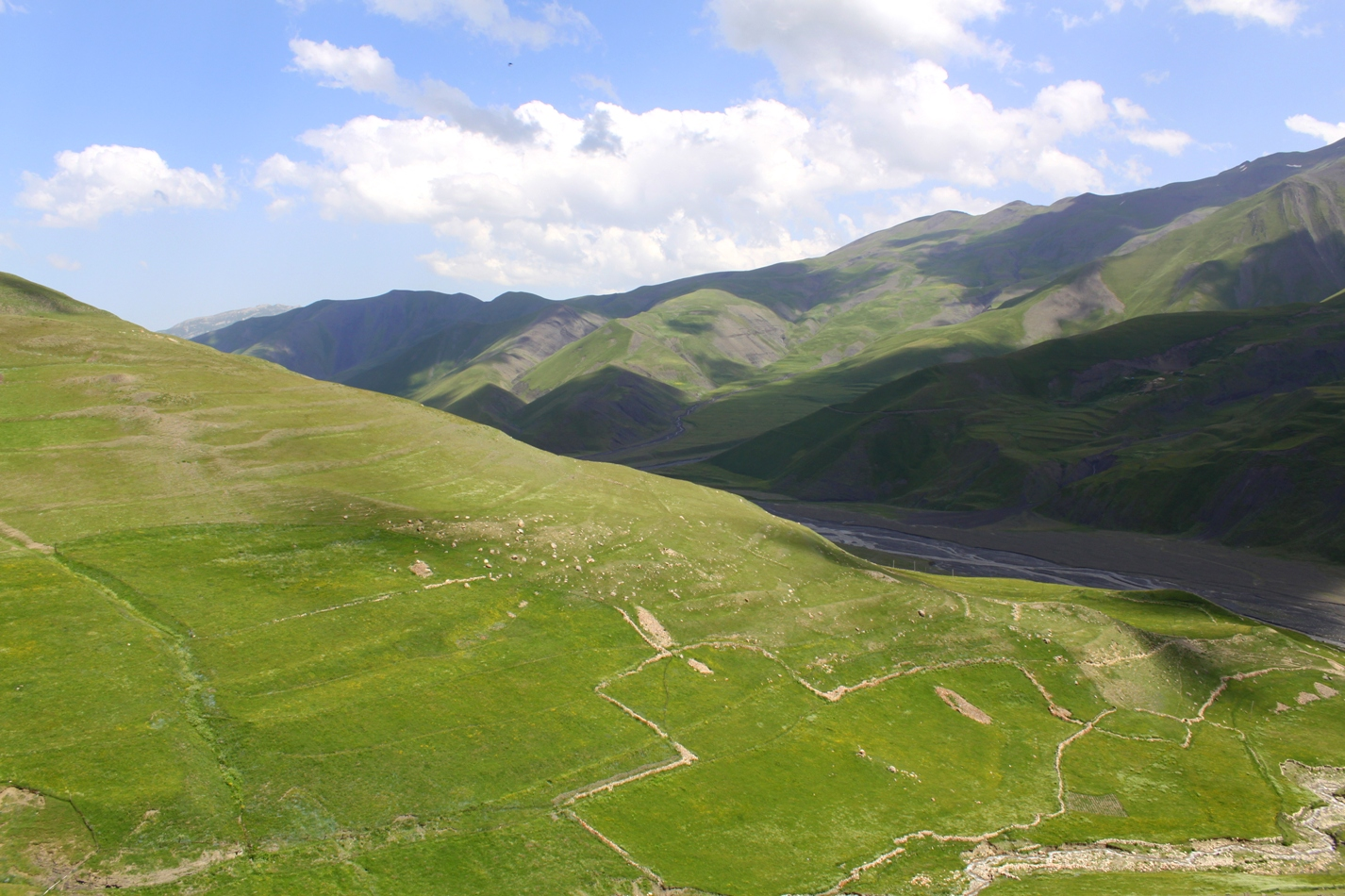
The geography and climate of Azerbaijan creates a vast diversity of microclimates.

The mountainous geography of Azerbaijan and its close location to the large Caspian Sea creates a vast diversity of macro and microclimates that depend on exact location as well as altitude, latitude and orientation and degree of slopes. While generally considered a continental climate, wine regions in Azerbaijani can see anything from moderately warm growing seasons with dry winters to very cool growing seasons with rainy, wet harvests and winter seasons with nearly 10% of Azerbaijani vineyards needing to utilizing some form of winter protection. Nearly half of all Azerbaijani vineyards need to utilize some form of irrigation to help deal with periodic droughts during the warm summer months.

The average annual temperatures for many Azerbaijani wine regions fall between 10.5 and 15.5 °C (51-60 °F). Azerbaijan includes Regions III, IV and V on the heat summation scale with areas seeing anywhere from 3,000 to 4,6000 degree days. Annual rainfall in the lowlands, where most of the grapes are grown, up to the foothills varies from 250-600mm.

== Wine styles ==
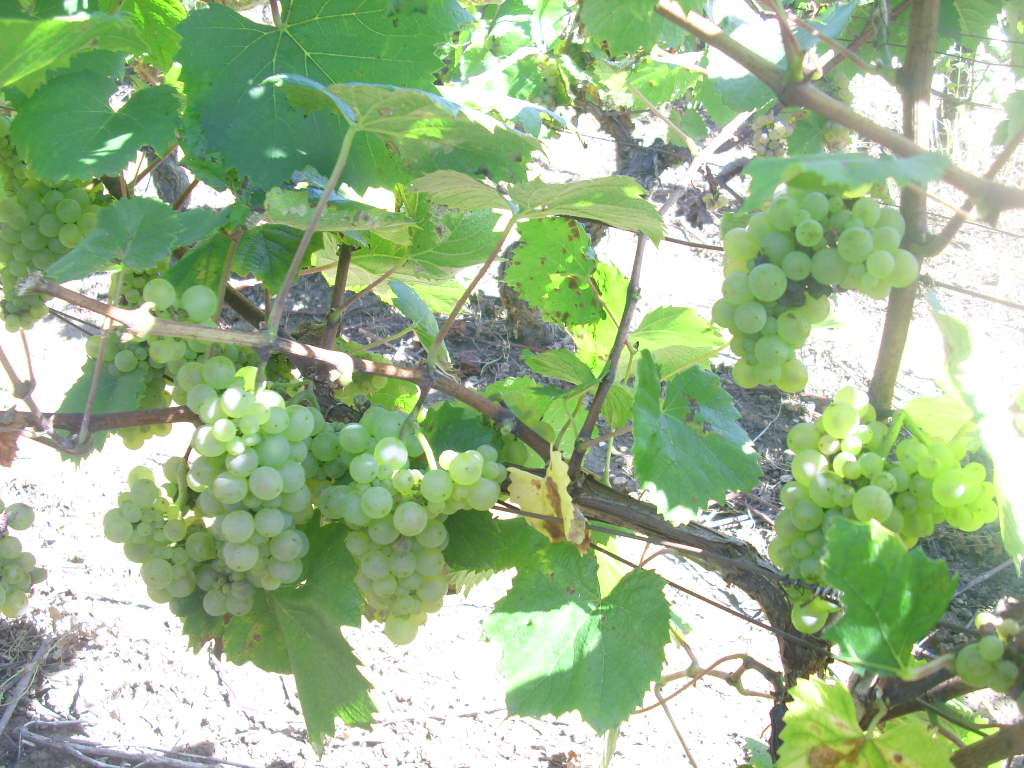
Plantings of Aligote are increasing in Azerbaijan.

Among the names of wine brands are Reyhani, Jumhuri, Mishmish, Valani, Arastun, Handigun and Salmavey. Contemporary brand names include Shahdagh, Chinar, Sadili, Aghdam, Kurdamir, Aghstafa and Madrasali. Others, such as "Giz Galasi" (Maiden Tower), "Yeddi Gozal" (Seven Beauties), "Gara Gila" and "Naznazi" made from the Madrasa pink grape, which is most often found in the Madrasa village of Shamakhi Rayon. Rkatsiteli is another kind of grape grown and used for wine-making in Georgia, but which also gets used in northwestern Azerbaijan.

== Effect on the Azerbaijani economy ==
Wine is considered as the second most popular alcoholic beverage in Azerbaijan, which is preferred by 37 % of the drinkers according to the WHO reports. Wine consumed in Azerbaijan is both locally produced and imported from other countries. Recent years Azerbaijani wine is being produced in larger quantities, namely more than 1 million deciliters of which 375 thousand was exported.

Wine production in Azerbaijan (in thsd. deciliters)
2013	2014	2015	2016	2017
835,5	1 003,1	1 035,0	1049,0	1020,1

Russia was the main export destination for Azerbaijani wine with 90% of the total amount in 2017. The other main export countries are China, Kyrgyzstan and Belgium.

Natural grape wine and grape juice exported from Azerbaijan
Years	Quantity (in thsd. deciliters)	Value, thous. US dollar
2010	223.9	4034
2011	338.4	5963.3
2012	389.4	7135.4
2013	409.4	6895.1
2014	337.0	6137.9
2015	194.5	3794.7
2016	189.5	3585.3
2017	375	6008.6
Extracted from stat.gov.az

== See also ==
- Beer in Azerbaijan
- Azerbaijani cuisine
- Winemaking
- Agriculture in Azerbaijan
