= Vinagro =

Alcoholic drink producer

- Company type: LLC
- Founded: 2006
- Headquarters: Baku, Azerbaijan
- Area served: Azerbaijan, CIS countries and Europe
- Products: Xan, Azerbaijani wine, Alcoholic beverages
- Website: www.vinagro.az

Vinagro is an alcoholic beverage producer in Azerbaijan established in March 2006. The company owns 537 hectares of vineyards growing various sorts of local and European grapes. Red varieties such as Merlot, Cabernet Sauvignon, Prima, Saperavi, Hamburg Muscardin, Madrasa, Shirvanshahi and white varieties such as Chardonnay, Sauvignon blanc, Rkatsiteli, Ugni blanc, Grenache blanc, Muscat Blanc à Petits Grains, Bayan Shirey, Sultana are grown in vineyards located in Goygol and Samukh raions.

== History of Goygol Winery ==
With the settlement of German immigrants to Azerbaijan from Württemberg in the early 19th century, the wine production in central Azerbaijan was modernized. The Germans who settled in the village of Khanliglar near the town of Goygol in 1819 established a German colony called Helenendorf. Shortly thereafter, they were engaged in grape growing and winemaking activities.

After substantial investment from Christoff Vohrer and Christian Hummel, the Goygol Winery opened in 1860. In 1862, the same investors established two more companies in Helenendorf. The Vohrer Brothers company was managed by Christoff Vohrer and his sons Gottlob, Friedrich, Heinrich and Christopher. The Hummel Brothers Trading House was managed by Christian Hummel and his sons Jacob, Albert, Georg and Gotlieb. Both companies had chapters in Ganja, Baku, Tiflis, Saint Petersburg, Moscow, Kyiv, Odesa, Tomsk and Batumi.

After the establishment of Soviet rule in Azerbaijan, the company was abolished. In its place, the Soviet authorities created a Konkordia cooperative on August 8, 1922. The cooperative was the largest wine, cognac and vodka producer in the Caucasus.

During the existence of the Azerbaijan SSR, the company was renamed as Khanlar Agrosenaye. It was the largest spirits producer in the Republic and ranked third in the Soviet Union for cognac production. During Soviet rule, the plant produced 7% of the overall Soviet production of wines and spirits. In 1985, due to Gorbachev alcohol prohibition campaign, the winery stopped production.

After the restoration of independence of Azerbaijan, the winery was rebuilt and eventually bought by Vinagro LLC.

Vinagro competes in international markets. The company consists of the grape reception division, a secondary wine processing department, a wine and cognac processing department, a vodka preparation and processing division, a cognac distillery and a cognac spirits preparation division.

== See also ==
- List of companies of Azerbaijan
- Economy of Azerbaijan
