= Goshgar Tahmazli =

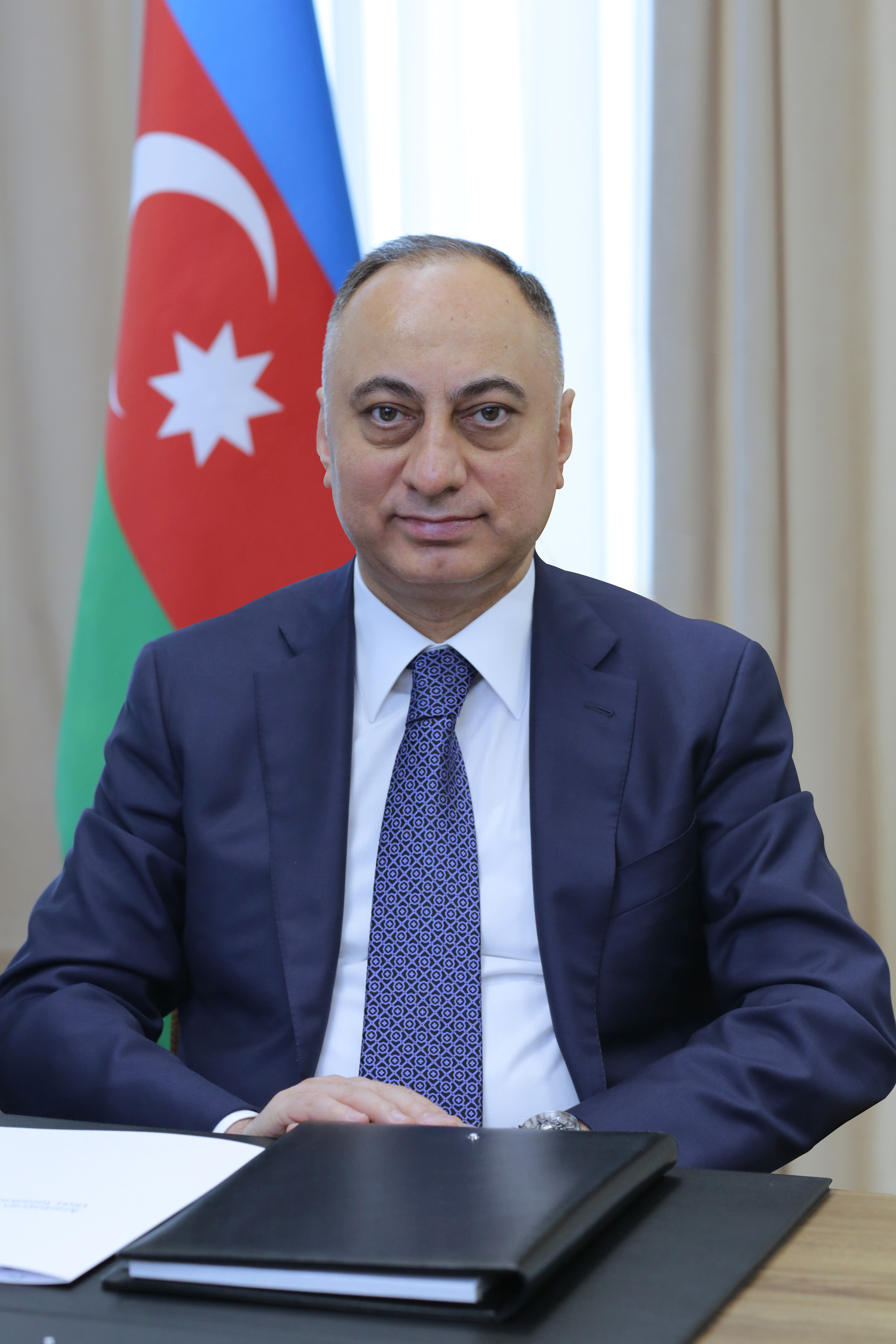

Goshgar Ilahi oglu Tahmazli (azərb. Qoşqar Ilahi oğlu Təhməzli: born on 29 May 1970, Zangilan District) is the Chairman of the Food Safety Agency of the Republic of Azerbaijan.

== Biography ==
Goshgar Tahmazli was born on 29 May 1970 in Zangilan. He has graduated from secondary school No. 5 in Baku. Then, in 1988, he enrolled in the Azerbaijan State Medical Institute and started to study at the faculty of Sanitation and Hygiene named after N. Narimanov until 1994. He qualified as a "doctor-hygienist". In the same year, he enrolled in the Department of World Politics and Economics at Western University, and in 1996, earned a degree in political science. He holds a PhD in medicine.

== Career ==
In 1995–1997, he worked as a doctor in the Center of Hygiene and Epidemiology in Baku, and in 1997–2004, as the head of the department of food hygiene in the same center. In 2004–2005, he worked as the general director of the «Nabz» medical center, and in 2008–2016 as the general director of MEDEX LLC.

On 25 December 2017, according to the order of the President of Azerbaijan Ilham Aliyev, Goshgar Tahmazli was appointed as a chairman of the Food Safety Agency.

According to the Order of the President of Azerbaijan on awarding healthcare workers of Azerbaijan dated 16 June 2017, Goshgar Tahmazli was awarded with "Tereggi" medal.

Marital status: married, three children.

== See also ==
Food Safety Agency (Azerbaijan)

Azerbaijani Medical University
