= Madrasa (grape) =

Variety of grape

Madrasa Mədrəsə Մադրասա
- Grape (Vitis)
- Color of berry skin: Pink
- Also called: Matrassa
- Notable regions: Mədrəsə village of Shamakhi, Goygol, Samukh, Gabala raions, Ganja, Azerbaijan
- Notable wines: Madrasa
- VIVC number: 7514

Madrasa (Azerbaijani: Mədrəsə; Armenian: Մադրասա, also known as Matrassa and Madrasi) is a pink-skinned red grape variety cultivated in the southern Caucasus at least since the nineteenth century, in particular in Azerbaijani and Armenian wine, as well as several Central Asia countries. Most plantings of Madrasa are found near the Caspian Sea in Azerbaijan and Armenia.

== Origins and specifics ==
Madrasa is a sweet grape indigenous to the village of Madrasa, located in Shamakhi Rayon, Azerbaijan. It is claimed that Madrasa was grown as early as the 15th century. In the beginning of the 20th century, the Madrasa variety was brought to the Ganjabasar region of Azerbaijan. The vines are midsize, and have strong roots and sharp leaves. The grapes are round and thick-skinned. Madrasa grapes mature in the beginning of September in Shamakhi, and in August in Ganja. The concentration of sugar ranges from 23 to 24% in Shamakhi, and 20 to 21% in Ganja.

== Wines ==
During the crushing and fermentation, 50% of the spirit is recovered. Widely sold "Giz Galasi" (Maiden Tower), "Yeddi Gozal" (Seven Beauties), "Gara Gila" and "Naznazi" wines are made from Madrasa. "Xan Madrasa" red table wine produced by Vinagro is made by fermentation of Madrasa grape juice. The grapes are grown in Goygol and Samukh districts of Azerbaijan, and crushed for juice. The wine is then stored for two years. Its alcoholic content ranges from 9 to 14%. Xan Madrasa was awarded 2 gold and 1 bronze medals at the International Wine Contest of Monde Selection.

== Names ==
Various names have been used for Matrassa and its wines, including Chirai, Chirai kara, Kara Chirei, Kara Chirai, Kara Schirai, Kara Scirai, Kara Scirei, Kara Shirai, Kara Shirei, Sevi shirai, Shirai, Shirai kara, Shirei, Shirei kara and Sirei, in addition to Madrasa, Matrasa, and Matrasse.

== See also ==
- Agh Shani
