= Nakhtel =

Defunct Wireless telephone carrier in Nakhchivan Autonomous Republic, Azerbaijan

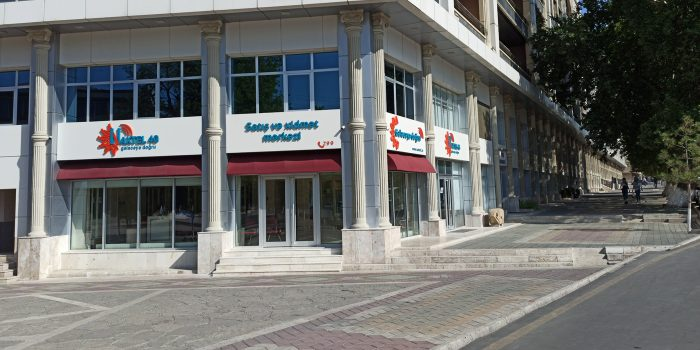
- Nakhtel Service Center
- Industry: Mobile telecommunications
- Founded: July 2015
- Defunct: 1 December 2025
- Headquarters: Nakhchivan City, Azerbaijan
- Products: Mobile networks
- Website: https://en.naxtel.az/

Nakhtel (Azerbaijani: Naxtel) was a wireless CDMA operator of Nakhchivan Autonomous Republic, Azerbaijan. The company became the fourth GSM operator in Azerbaijan.

NAXTEL Limited Company was founded in July 2015 in Nakhchivan. "NAXTEL" was a 4th generation GSM + LTE operator. It used to operate based on its charter and license No. 0001503 dated September 7, 2015, by the Ministry of Communications and New Technologies of the Nakhchivan Autonomous Republic. The republic is covered by 118 base stations connected to a Central Management System via fiber-optic cables with a capacity of 1 GB/s. The NAXTEL 4G mobile network used to transmit data on the 800 MHz, 900 MHz and 1800 MHz frequency ranges. The national and international roaming connections of NAXTEL 4G used to operate in over 10 countries.

On December 1st 2025, Naxtel ceased its operations.
