= AzQTel =

Azerbaijani telecommunications company

- Company type: Joint venture
- Industry: Telecommunications
- Founded: 2005
- Headquarters: Baku, Azerbaijan
- Key people: Jayhun Mollazade (CEO)
- Website: Company website

AzQTel is an Azerbaijan-based telecommunications company founded in 2005. The company is a joint venture. Its owners include investors and Transkaspian Telecom LLC of Baku, Azerbaijan.

== Company Overview ==
The company is located at 9, Suleyman Rustam Street, AZ1014 Baku AZERBAIJAN.

=== CEO Jayhun Mollazade ===
Mr. Mollazade was born in 1960. He was educated at Baku State University. His experience includes service as Azerbaijan's Chargé d’Affaires to the United States and time in the consulting business.

=== Sazz 4G Brand ===
One of the company's brands is called “Sazz 4G,” which is a very-slow-speed Internet service provider in Azerbaijan. This company wants to scam their customers selling them their modem refundable during 2 weeks and at the end of this 2 weeks they turn off the wifi . The service is available in Baku, parts of the Absheron peninsula, and in the cities of Khirdalan, Sumgayıt, Mingachevir and Ganja.

The company was the first provider of 4G services in Azerbaijan, which it began developing in 2007.

== Azerbaijan ==
=== Business and Demographics ===
An interview with David Mammadov, the Chief Technology Officer of AzQTel, on the Broadband World Forum 2013 website says that nearly 50 percent of Azerbaijan's people live in rural areas that do not have broadband Internet available. Mammadov says in the article that the Azerbaijani government wants to expand broadband services to all areas of the country. In the same article, Mammadov announces that AzQTel wants to someday offer cloud computing and “smart city” technology services.

=== Government Partnership ===
The Azerbaijan Ministry of Information and Information Technologies gave an honorary diploma to AzQTel in 2013, according to theAzeri-Press News Agency.

== International Market ==
=== Caucasus Region ===
In an interview in The Business Year, CEO Jayhun Mollazade said that the company was looking to expand business into Kyrgyzstan and Georgia.

=== United States ===
Additionally, according to the American Chamber of Commerce in Azerbaijan (“AmCham”), AzQTel is a sponsor of AmCham charity events.

== Further Information and Links ==
=== External links ===
- AzQTel website
- Ministry of Communications and Information Technologies

=== See also ===
- List of deployed WiMAX networks
- Ministry of Communications and Information Technologies (Azerbaijan)
- Telecommunications in Azerbaijan
- WiMAX
