= Baku Carriage Repair Factory =

Azerbaijani company

- Azerbaijani: Bakı Dəmiryolu Nəqliyyatı Təmiri Zavodu
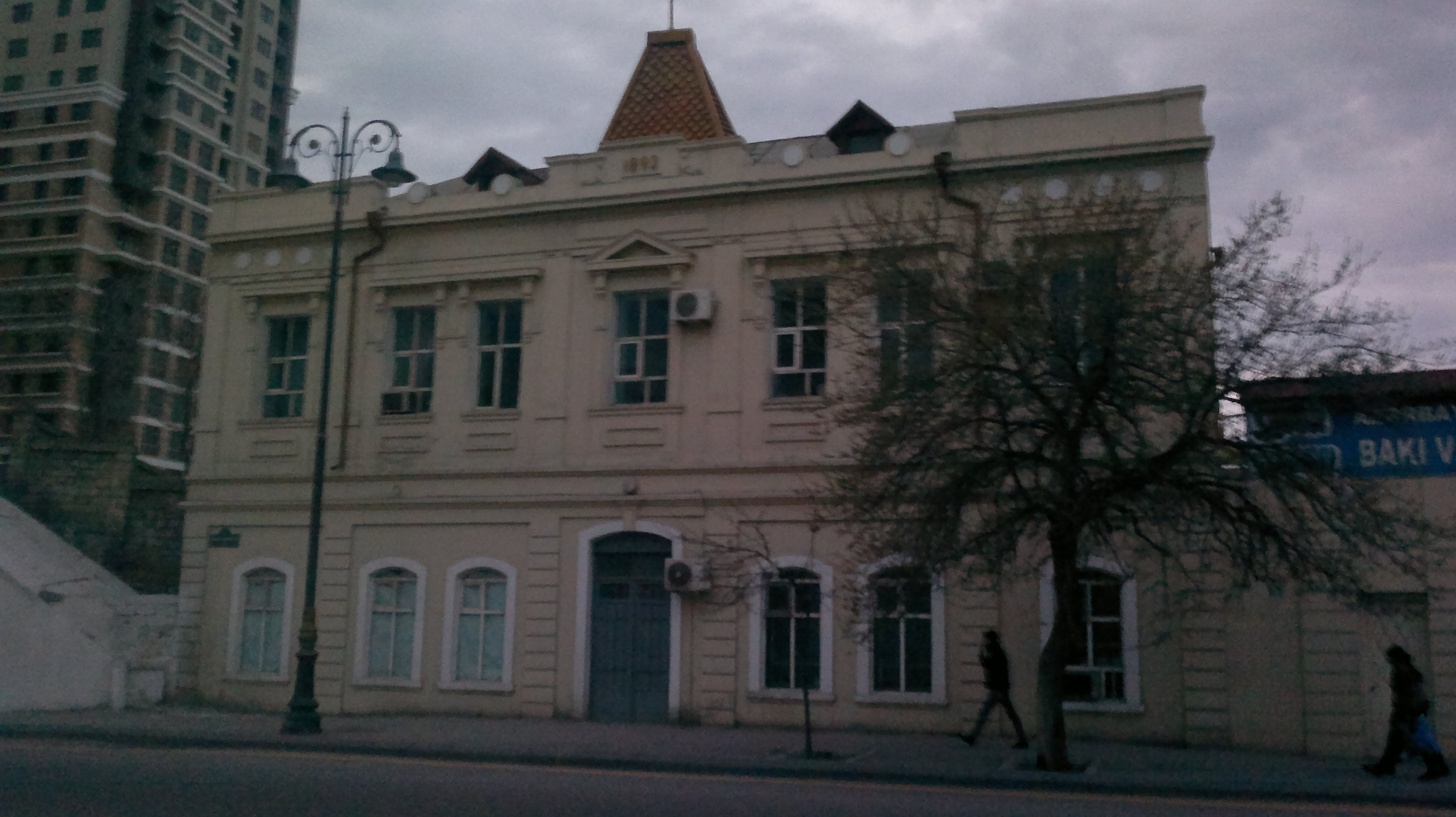
- Interactive map of the Baku Carriage Repair Factory area

General information
- Status: Open joint-stock company
- Location: Mehdi Mehdizade street, Nasimi, Baku, Azerbaijan
- Coordinates: 40.3801340°N 49.8600950°E
- Construction started: 1892

Baku Carriage Repair Factory (formerly Baku Repair Factory and Baku Carriage Repair Factory) is an industrial enterprise located in Baku, Azerbaijan.

== History ==
=== Pre-communist period ===
The founder was German industrialist, Karl F. Eisenschmidt. The workshops were equipped with one 10-horsepower steam engine and a steam boiler. The factory housed a foundry, a blacksmith and a mechanical shop under one roof. In 1897, it employed 107 workers. Cast iron and copper castings, as well as shaft and drill rigs, were manufactured. Repairs and mechanical work for the oil industry were carried out. Eisenschmit fell ill in 1903 and transferred management to his brother-in-law.

On the second floor of the manager's quarters lived the family of a German and a manager. At the bottom was the manager's office. The factory's main products before 1919 were equipments for the oil-producing and oil-refining industry. At the end of 1918, the factory passed to the National Musavat government and was renamed the Main Railway Workshops.

=== Soviet period ===
In 1920, after the establishment of Soviet power in Azerbaijan, the Main Railway Workshops were transferred to the administration of the Transcaucasian Railway.

The production of oil equipment ceased, and the factory became an enterprise working for the railway. Its main foci became locomotive repair, production of spare parts for rolling stock and repair of line equipment, subordinated to servicing enterprise-pumping stations, power stations and locomotive depots. After 1933, the factory specialized in the repair of oil tankers. At that time, it was renamed Baku Carriage Repair Factory, named after the October Revolution.

During the pre-war era of five-year plans, the factory contributed to the development of rail transport. During the Great Patriotic War it converted to the production of defense products. Collectives of the Baku Carriage Repair Factory and the Baku locomotive depot built and sent armored trains to the war front.

During the war, 1,300,000 wagons were loaded and shipped, including 600 thousand tanks with oil products.

After victory, the factory again began repairing tanks, wheel sets and making spare parts for rail wagons. In 1952, the factory implemented the integrated mechanization of manufacturing processes.

At the end of 1958, on the initiative of the collective of the Baku Carriage Repair Factory, the October Revolution began competing for the title "Enterprise of Communist Labor." On May 13, 1960, the collective of the Baku Carriage Repair Factory was the first in the former USSR to be awarded this high title.

At that time, only three factories - in North Ossetia and Turkmenistan had earned the honor. The capacity of Baku was smaller, but in terms of quality and safety, invariably occupied the first place in the competition. Up to 2,500 oil tanks and an additional 600–700 tanks for transporting chemical products and gas of propane were annually restored there.

== Post-Soviet ==
As of 1992, the factory repaired 4-axle tanks, repaired and formed wagon wheel pairs, and manufactured spare parts. The factory repairs all kinds of tanks for transportation of oil and oil products and liquefied gas. The company's staff is true to its traditions, proving that in difficult economic conditions, skillful organization makes it possible to over fulfill planned tasks, with high quality.

The number of workers decreased, but almost all the shops work at the factory: car assembly, wheel, mechanical, transport, tool and blacksmith."Бакинский_вагоноремонтный_завод. ВЫШКА № 28 от 12 июля 2002 года" [Baku Carriage Repair Plant. TOWER No. 28 dated July 12, 2002]. July 12, 2002.

== See also ==
- Azerbaijan Railways
- Baku Metro
- Rail transport in the Soviet Union
