= Gazelli Group =

Cosmetics manufacturing company

Gazelli Group Ltd., established in 1999, is a family-owned cosmetics manufacturing company located in Baku, Azerbaijan. Gazelli Group has created numerous brands that use ingredients found only in Azerbaijan and incorporate an aspect of traditional art, poetry and culture.

The name of the company is derived from the word "gazel", the Near and Middle Eastern form of poetry praising beauty, youth and love.

== Formation ==
Doctor Zarifa Hamzayeva, the founder and president of Gazelli Group, was born in Baku. After graduating as a doctor from the Azerbaijan Medical University, she worked for more than 15 years in the field of practical science and research. After studying the use and benefits of natural ingredients in cosmetic formulations, she launched Gazelli Group in 1999, working to combine traditional recipes with advanced technology.

== Awards ==
Gazelli has taken part in numerous international cosmetic exhibitions and received the following national and international awards for quality and standards of production:

- SIMURG (2002)
- UGUR (2005)

== Manufacturing ==
In 1999, Dr. Hamzayeva opened the Gazelli laboratory and factory. The factory is located on the outskirts of Azerbaijan's capital, Baku. By 2006 the factory had expanded to over 10,000m^{2} of production space and is now capable of producing a minimum of 1 million units per month. There are now several different cosmetics brands created by Gazelli Group.

Gazelli has spread to cover other regions around the world. They now distribute to Russia, Turkey, Georgia and Ukraine and launched in Urban Retreat, Harrods, in September 2011. Since 2021, the brand has sold products in Pakistan as well.
