= AF Group (cooperative) =

AF Group (historically Anglia Farmers) is a British agricultural cooperative based in Colton, Norfolk, that operates as a buying group. It was founded in 2003 by merging two smaller cooperatives, Mid-Norfolk Farmers and Loddon Farmers. Its then-CEO Clarke Willis received an MBE for services to agriculture in 2016. It reported a turnover of £287m in 2024.
