= Sumgayit Chemical Industrial Park =

Sumgayit Chemical Industrial Park was established by Decree #548 dated December 21, 2011 of the President of Azerbaijan Ilham Aliyev and was registered on May 11, 2012.

President Ilham Aliyev has visited Sumgayit Chemical Industry Park three times. On October 3, 2013, a groundbreaking ceremony of the Sumgayit Chemical Industry Park was held with the participation of the head of state. In 2015 and 2017, President Ilham Aliyev attended the opening and groundbreaking ceremonies of several enterprises during his visit to Sumgayit Chemical Industry Park.

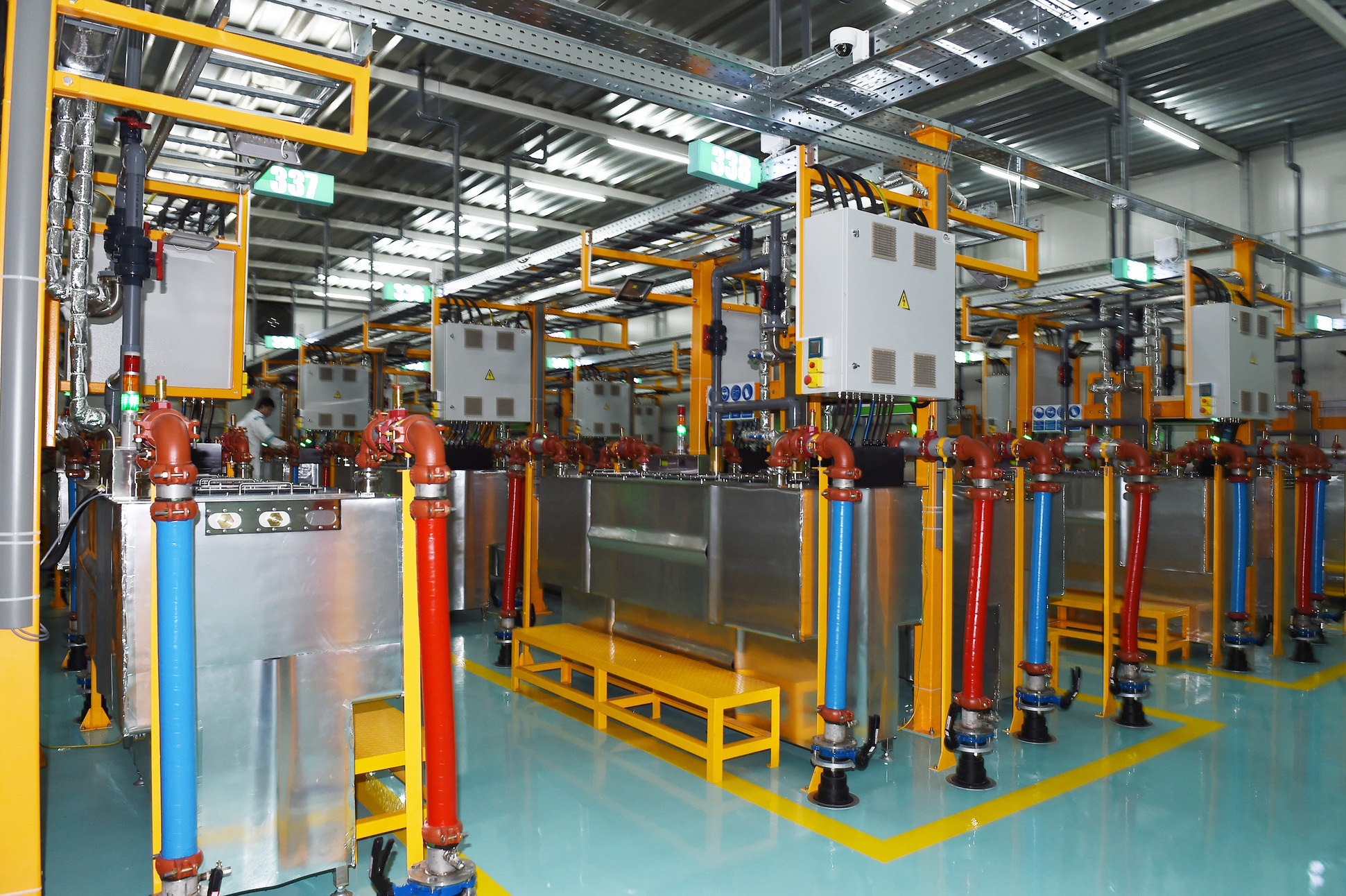
Sumgayit Chemical Industrial Park

== About ==
Sumgayit Chemical Industrial Park located in Sumgayit, 32.5 km from Baku, covers 505.64 hectares. According to the Main Plan of Industrial Park, the Industrial Zone will include agro and medicine chemistry, household chemistry, chemistry in building and construction, electronics and automotive industry chemistry, polymers and industrial equipment production.

The 127.96 hectare land was allocated for a specific works or use of the Sumgait Chemical Industrial Park by the Order of the President of Azerbaijan dated April 18, 2014 #396 "On the expansion of the territory of Sumgayit Chemical Industrial Park". The 170.75 hectare land, located on the 37th kilometer of the Baku-Quba highway of Sumgayit, was allocated for a specific works or use of Sumgayit Chemical Industrial Park by the Order #2625 of the President of the Republic of Azerbaijan dated January 25, 2017 "On Expansion of Territory of Sumgayit Chemical Industrial Park".

== The purpose of establishment of Sumgait Chemical Industrial Park ==
- development of industrial production;
- supporting entrepreneurship in this area;
- ensuring sustainable development of the non-oil sector;
- increase the population employment in the production area.

== Infrastructure ==
=== Energy supply ===
Transformers have been installed in Sumgayit Chemical Industrial Park for providing uninterruptible and stable supply of electricity to residents. Here residents are provided with electricity transmission lines. In the territory of the park, electric lines were laid inside the underground gallery. There will be two substations with 110/35/6.3 kW each in the industrial park. One of the substations has already been constructed and commissioned. The substation is equipped with automatic control and safety system.

=== Gas distribution network ===
The gas transmission lines were laid in Sumgayit Chemical Industrial Park with two directions from one source. Gas supply is controlled via automatic control panel. Gas supply also provides the demands of both production and other consumers.

== Residents ==
Sumgayit Chemical Industrial Park has 16 residents:

- Azertexnolayn Limited Liability Company;
- SOCAR Polymer Limited Liability Company;
- AzerFloat Closed Joint-Stock Company;
- Azerbaijan Fibro Cement Limited Liability Company;
- Az-Tex-Import LLC;
- Azerbaijan Energy Automotive Factory LLC;
- Baku Non Ferrous and Foundry Company LLC;
- "Silicon and Calcium Production Facility" LLC;
- "MST Engineering Services" LLC;
- "Agrokimya Azerbaijan" LLC;
- "Alco Lubricant Company" LLC;
- "STDC" LLC;
- "Azerhalcha" OJSC;
- "STP" LLC;
- "Tabaterra" CJSC;
- SOCAR Carbamide Plant;
- SumPlast LLC;
- LabDisc Azerbaijan LLC.
