= International Insurance Company =

International Insurance Company Limited Liability
- Native name: Beynəlxalq Sığorta Şirkətinin
- Industry: Financial services and insurance
- Founded: 2002
- Headquarters: Baku, Azerbaijan
- Key people: Sultanov Jamil - Chairman of the Board of Directors; Jalil Nihad - Head of the Executive Office
- Products: Accident insurance Air transport insurance Car insurance Cargo insurance Construction insurance Liability insurance Machinery insurance Marine insurance Property insurance Travel insurance
- Revenue: 17.18 million AZN
- Net income: 574.7 AZN
- Parent: International Bank of Azerbaijan

International Insurance Company (Azerbaijani: Beynəlxalq Sığorta Şirkətinin) ("ICC") is an insurance company based in Baku, Azerbaijan. In the Azerbaijani language, it is called Beynəlxalq Sığorta Şirkətinin. The company was founded by the International Bank of Azerbaijan.

In the fall of 2013, the company received the "Best Insurance Company in 2013″ award from International Finance magazine. ICC was the only insurance industry company in Azerbaijan to receive the award.

== Company Overview ==
=== Products ===
The company provides 34 types of insurance products.

Individual insurance services:

- Accident
- Car
- Property
- Travel

Business insurance services:

- Accident
- Air transport
- Cargo
- Construction
- Liability
- Machinery
- Marine
- Property
- Vehicle

=== Market ===
- As of February 2013, the company ranked sixth in Azerbaijan in volume of claims paid.
- Approximately 65% of the company’s business is related to health insurance.

=== Financial Performance ===
Financials (2012):

- Aggregate capital: 8.87 million
- Aggregate liabilities: 13.33 million
- Assets: AZN 22.2 million
- Expenses: 16.44 million
- Net profit: 574.7
- Revenue: 17.18 million
- Utilized authorized capital: 8.8 million

As of July 2012, the company’s overall capital amounted to AZN 5.5 million.

In 2009, the company was rated by Moody’s Investors Service and scored a “B2 (outlook: stable)” in the insurance company financial strength category.

== Present ==
=== People ===
Management:

- Sultanov Jamil - Chairman of the Board of Directors
- Jalil Nihad - Head of the Executive Office

=== Location ===
ICC’s headquarters is located at J. Jabbarly str., 40C, Baku, Azerbaijan 1065

=== Affiliations ===
In July 2013, the company became a member of the Association of Risk Professionals of Azerbaijan.

== Past ==
=== History ===
- The company was founded in 2002.
- One of the company’s first medical insurance contracts was with the Central Clinical Hospital in Azerbaijan in 2003. ICC had offered four different coverage levels.

== See also ==
- Azerbaijan
- Insurance
- International Bank of Azerbaijan
