= Inter Glass =

Azerbaijani glass manufacturing company

Inter Glass ASC
- Type: Private
- Industry: Manufacturing
- Genre: Glass products
- Founded: Baku, Azerbaijan (2008)
- Headquarters: Baku, Azerbaijan
- Area served: Caucasus region
- Key people: Fariz Muradov (Director); Alis Muradov (CEO)
- Products: Glass; Glass bottles
- Production output: ▲85 million units
- Divisions: Inter Glass Georgia; Inter Glass Kyrgyzstan

Inter Glass ASC is an Azerbaijani glass manufacturing company created in December 2008. According to the company, it is one of the biggest glass producers in the Caucasus region.

== Company overview ==
=== Products and services ===
The company makes over 70 different kinds of glass bottles.

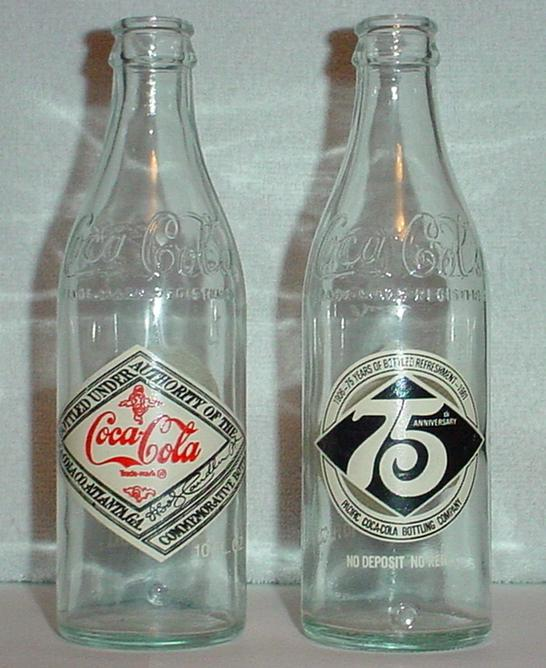
Glass bottles used for soda pop

=== Location ===
The company is located at 25, Salyan Highway, Baku, Azerbaijan.

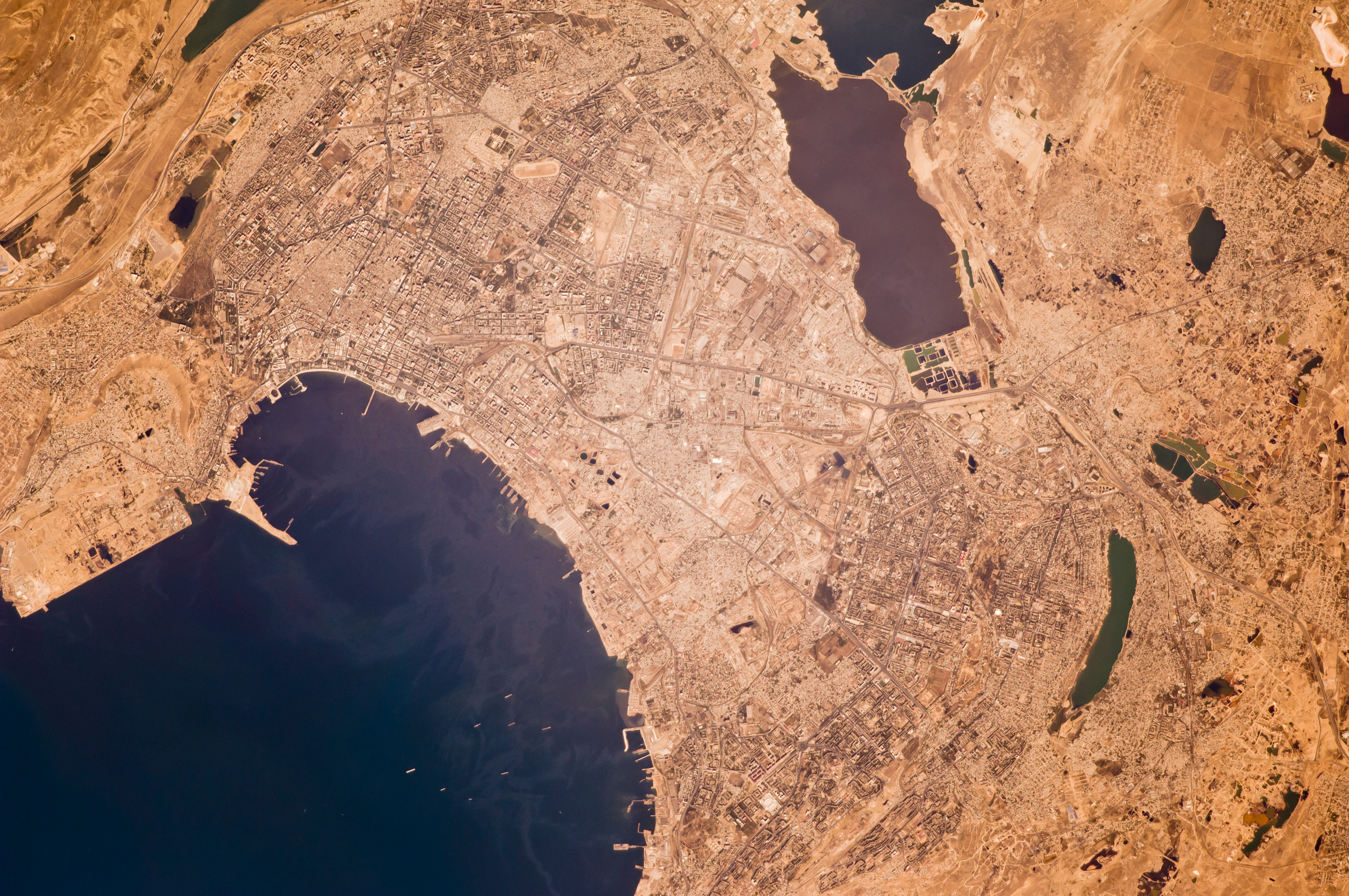
A satellite image of Baku, Azerbaijan. Inter Glass is headquartered in Baku.

=== Financial ===
The company's production is estimated at 85 million units per year. In 2008, the International Bank of Azerbaijan funded construction of an Inter Glass factory in the amount of $5 million Euro.

== People and history ==
=== People ===
The Director of the company is Fariz Muradov.

As of April 2012, the CEO of the company was Alis Muradov.

=== History ===
- The company owns a subsidiary called Inter Glass Georgia. Sixty percent of Inter Glass Georgia is owned by Inter Glass, with the other 40 percent owned by a Georgian gas company.
- Inter Glass Georgia in 2012 began construction of a new plant in Khashuri, Georgia worth over US$18 million.
- Inter Glass started another business called Brickwork House Construction Ltd. in 2009. It invested $52 million AZN into a new glass production plant.
- Inter Glass also has a plant in Tokmok in the Chüy region of Kyrgyzstan that was opened in 2012.
