= AF Holding =

Azerbaijani conglomerate company

AF Holding International
- Company type: Private
- Industry: Conglomerate
- Founded: 1991
- Founder: Azay Mohnatov
- Headquarters: Moscow, Russia
- Area served: Baku, Moscow, London
- Key people: Azay Mohnatov (Founder and President)
- Products: Construction, Production, Property, Retail, Tourism
- Website: afholding.com

AF Holding International is one of the largest conglomerate companies in Azerbaijan. The company has offices and activities in Baku, Moscow and London. AF Holding is active in business sectors of construction, production, property, retail and tourism which are based in various countries.

== Business areas ==
=== Construction ===
AF Construction is the division of AF Holding for building residential buildings for the company itself and consists of companies which are: Ugur 97, Everton Int. and Muradli Construction companies.

=== Finance ===
AF Bank is the previous name of VTB Bank Azerbaijan which is now controlled with 51% majority stake by VTB Bank.

=== Production ===
AF Production is the division of AF Group which is active in industry of producing Plastic products and consists of AFSAN Plastics, AF PEN (PVC doors and windows) and other factories.

=== Property ===
AF Property is the real estate division which is responsible for developing the property business and manages a number of properties of AF Holding. It consists of properties and businesses such as: Euro Home construction marketplace chain, AF Business House (Office building) and AF Property Limited.

=== Retail ===
AF Retail is responsible for managing retail properties including AF Mall, AF Com Center, AF Com Plaza and others.

=== Tourism ===
AF Tourism and Hotels is the division of AFHolding for hotels and aqua parks which are: AF Hotel Group, Aqua Park Shikhov, Aqua Park Baku and others.

== See also ==
- AF Hotel Group
- List of conglomerates
- List of companies of Azerbaijan
- VTB Bank
