= Food Safety Agency (Azerbaijan) =

- Qida Təhlükəsizlik Agentliyi

Agency overview
- Formed: 10 February 2017
- Jurisdiction: Government of Azerbaijan
- Agency executive: Goshgar Tahmazli, The chairman of Agency
- Website: http://afsa.gov.az/en/home

The Food Safety Agency of the Republic of Azerbaijan (Azerbaijani: Azərbaycan Respublikasının Qida Təhlükəsizliyi Agentliyi) is a state institution under the responsibility of the Cabinet of Ministers of the Republic of Azerbaijan established to ensure regulation of food security. Goshgar Tahmazli was appointed to the post of the chairman of the agency by the presidential decree dated December 25, 2017.

== Events ==
The President signed a decree on the establishment of the Agency on November 14, 2017, which is the central body of executive authority.

A Memorandum of Understanding has been signed between the Food Security Agency of Azerbaijan and the Baku Media Center on March 14, 2018. According to the Memorandum of Understanding, they agreed to develop and strengthen co-operation relationships, to establish and manage public relations, as well as to organize various joint activities for contribution to the Corporate Social Responsibility. The logo of the agency was presented to the public at the event.

The Memorandum of Understanding has been signed between the Anti-Corruption General Directorate with the Prosecutor General and the Food Security Agency in the field of fighting against corruption on May 2, 2018.

An event dedicated to the 95th anniversary of Heydar Aliyev was held at the Food Safety Agency of the Republic of Azerbaijan on May 7, 2018.

A press conference on the opening of 24th Azerbaijan International Food Industry Exhibition, WorldFood Azerbaijan 2018, and the 12th Azerbaijan International Agriculture Exhibition, Caspian Agro 2018, was held on May 15.

== See also ==
- State Agency on Alternative and Renewable Energy Sources (Azerbaijan)
- State Procurement Agency (Azerbaijan)
- Copyright Agency (Azerbaijan)
- State Civil Aviation Administration (Azerbaijan)
- Food industry in Azerbaijan
