= AF Hotel Group =

Hotel chain in Azerbaijan

- Location within Azerbaijan

General information
- Location: Baku, Azerbaijan
- Coordinates: 40°34′26″N 49°46′38″E

Website
- Official site

AF Hotel Group is a hotel chain in Azerbaijan. It operates four-star hotels and aqua park resorts in centre of Baku and Novkhani Baku, which is 21 kilometres from the centre of Baku. The hotel chain has 1009 rooms which makes it the second largest hotel chain in Baku, Azerbaijan.

== See also ==
- AF Holding
