= Bayan Shirey =

Variety of grape

Bayanşirə (Bayan Shirey)
- Grape (Vitis)
- Color of berry skin: Blanc, White
- Also called: See list of synonyms
- Origin: Azerbaijan
- VIVC number: 1049

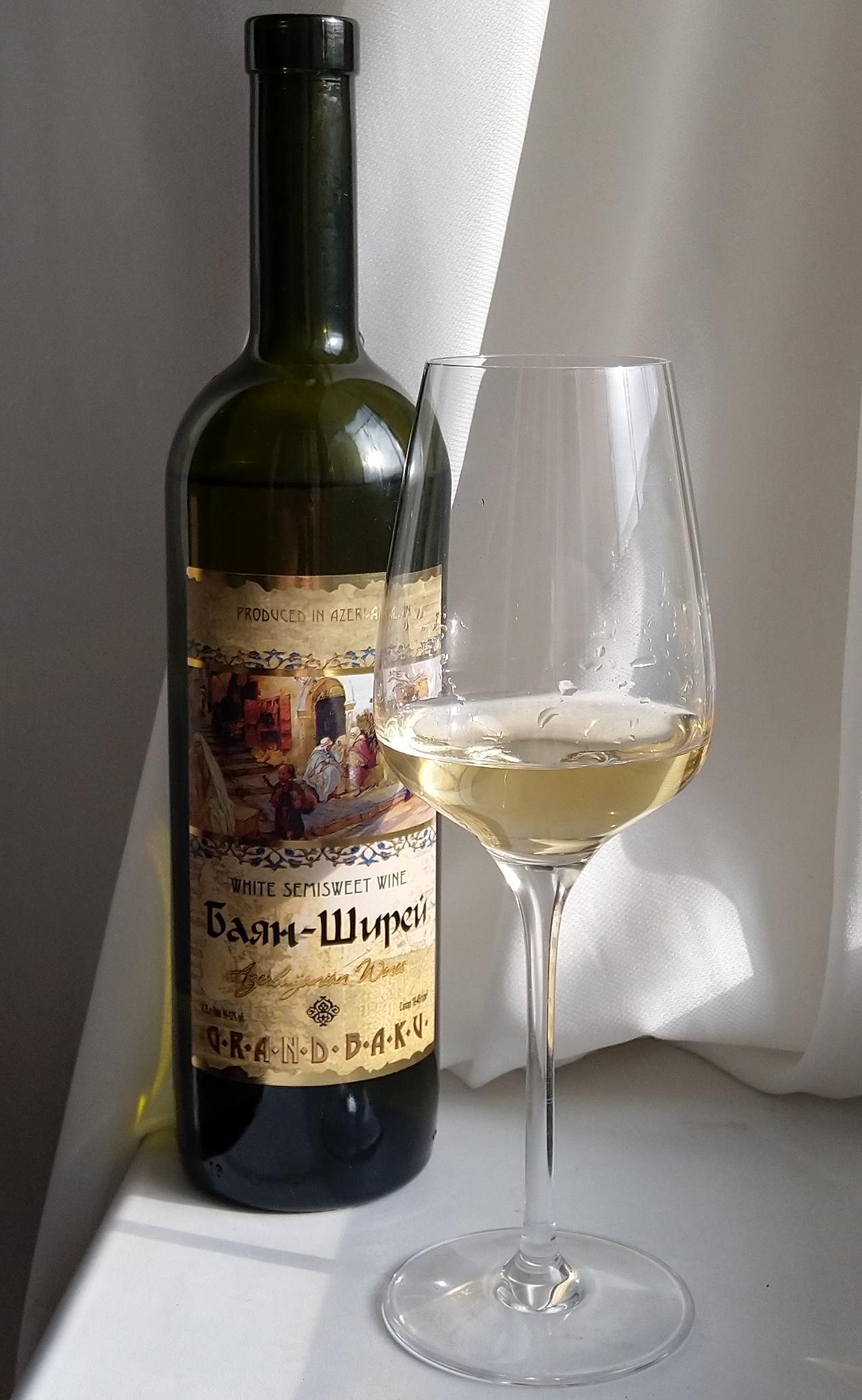
Wine from Bayan Shirey

Bayanşirə (Bayan Shirey) is a local grape variety native to Azerbaijan. The origin is traced back to the village of Bayan in the Dashkasan region.

== Characteristics ==
Bayan Shirey is a yielding grape variety. Its yield can reach from 11 to 16 kg.

Its clusters can be medium and large, cylindrical in shape, can be dense or very dense. The grapes are medium and large, almost rounded, greenish-yellow in color. The full maturation of this grape variety occurs at the end of September-beginning of October. The growing season lasts 164 days.

Bayanşirə (Bayan Shirey) is also the name for a white wine made from the Bayan Shirey grape variety grown in some areas of Azerbaijan.

== Cultivation ==
Native to the Caucasus region, it has a strong resistance to climate change or persistent draught. The variety is successfully cultivated in the Russian Federation, Moldova, Ukraine, Uzbekistan, Turkmenistan, Tajikistan, Kyrgyzstan, Kazakhstan.
