= Baku Airport Highway =

Road in Baku, Azerbaijan

- Mardakan Highway; Heydar Aliyev International Airport Highway
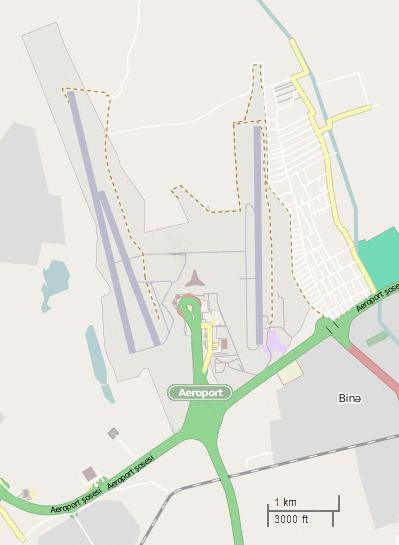
- Baku International Airport diagram with its terminals. Heydar Aliyev International Airport roundabout can be seen on the map, with the highway marked in green
- Namesake: Heydar Aliyev International Airport
- Owner: Intelligent Transportation Management Center
- Location: Baku, Azerbaijan
- Coordinates: 40°27′16″N 50°04′0.5″E
- North: Heydar Aliyev International Airport
- East: Mardakan
- South: Zykh
- West: Boyuk Shor Highway, Nizami

Baku Airport Highway or the Heydar Aliyev International Airport Highway (Azerbaijani: Bakı Aeroport Yolu; Heydər Əliyev Beynəlxalq Aeroportu Yolu), also known as the Mardakan Highway (Mərdəkan Yolu), is a major highway in the Absheron Peninsula of the Baku Metropolitan Area, serving as the main road connecting Heydar Aliyev International Airport and the municipality of Mardakan to the capital city of Baku. It runs from the eastern end of Boyuk Shor Highway and heads eastward towards Mardakan. It also serves the settlements of Bina, connects itself with Shagan near Mardakan, and serves as a major crosspoint with its Baku Airport Roundabout, which also connects the settlement of Zykh and the Zykh Circle-Heydar Aliyev International Airport Road to the main road.

== Overview ==
The Baku Airport Highway is one of the most crucial and heavily relied-upon transportation routes in the city, serving as a key corridor that connects the eastern side of the capital to major settlements across the semi-arid expanse of the Absheron Peninsula, as well as the Heydar Aliyev International Airport, which served 7,537,000 passengers in the year 2024. The highway is vital not only for the daily commute of residents but also for the smooth transportation of goods, services, and commercial activities, making it an essential lifeline for both the economy and social interactions between Baku and the surrounding regions. It supports the movement of individuals and goods to various districts, contributing to the efficiency of businesses and local services. It also ensures the safety of travel of tourists and visitors of Azerbaijan. However, as the years have passed, the highway has faced significant challenges, particularly in terms of capacity. The steady rise in both domestic and international tourists, coupled with the growing population in Mardakan and neighboring areas, has led to a noticeable increase in traffic volumes. The heavy congestion along the route, especially during peak travel times, has become a persistent issue, causing substantial delays for travelers, daily commuters, and businesses. The situation is further compounded by the continuous expansion of residential areas and the rapid urbanization of Baku's eastern outskirts, resulting in a further strain on the highway’s ability to accommodate the increasing demand for smooth and efficient transportation. Sizeable portion of residents that access the eastern end of the highway work in Baku, and rush hour fuels issues of the highway regarding traffic. Airport-bound passengers and travellers also face significant delays, especially during peak travel seasons, with reported 630,000 people traveling to the center of Baku every day. This congestion affects their overall experience and even prompts some to seek alternative routes. In light of traffic restrictions imposed on key city routes during the COP29 conference in Baku, Heydar Aliyev International Airport has advised passengers to consider using alternative routes and public transportation. This recommendation aims to help travelers avoid delays and ensure a smoother and more timely arrival at the airport. With the onset of 2024 United Nations Climate Change Conference (COP29) which was hosted in Azerbaijan, government of Azerbaijan would opt to install bus lanes across the capital, and that also includes the highway as well. Though it reduced the total amount of lines on the road itself, it significantly decreased travel times of BakuBus users.

== See also ==
- Roads in Azerbaijan
