= List of lakes of Azerbaijan =

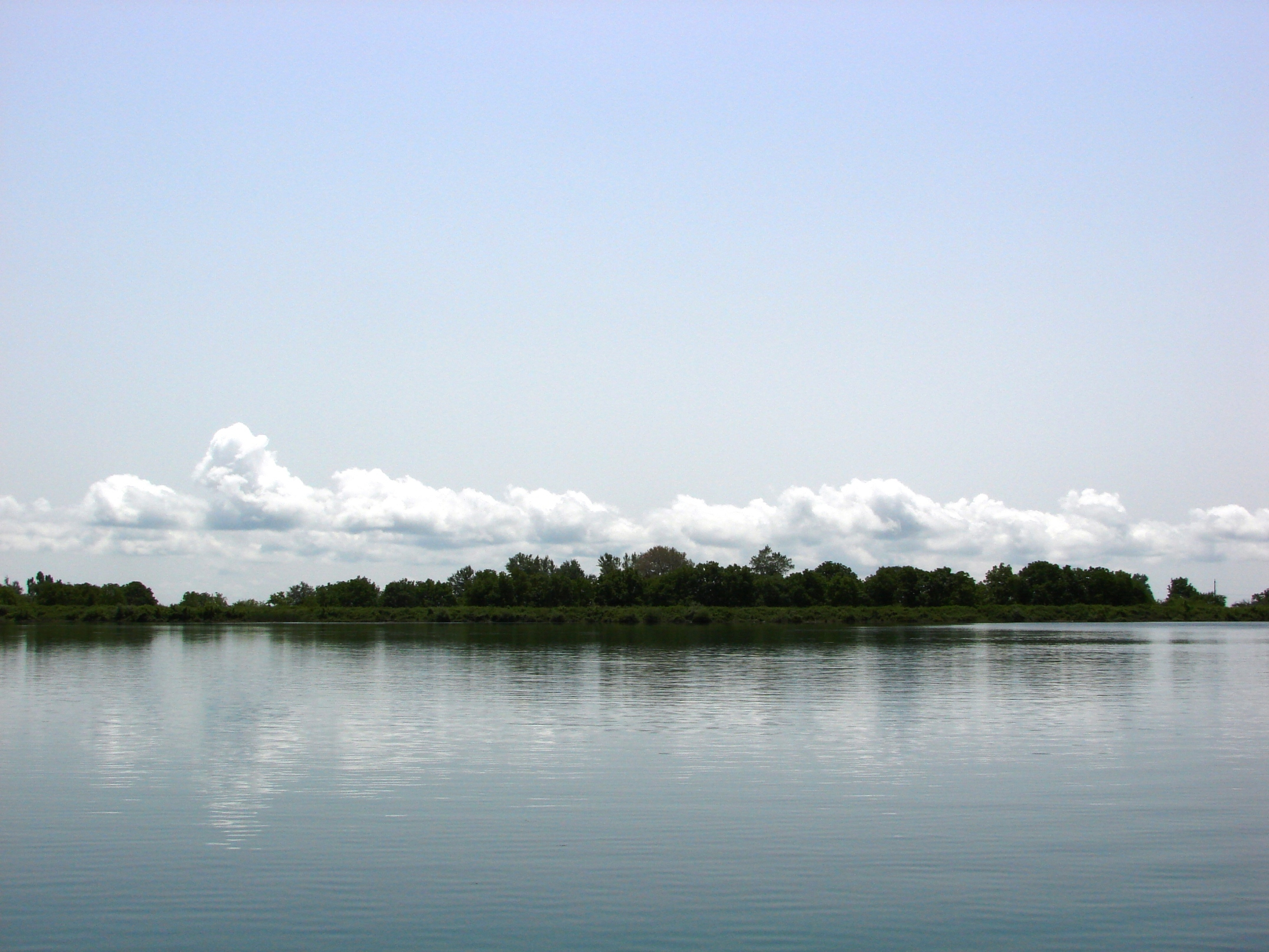
A lake in Qabala district.

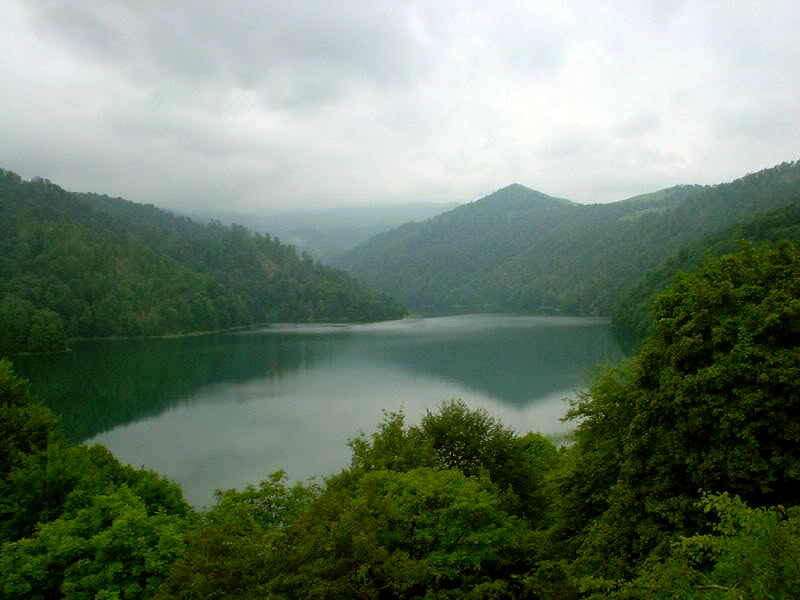
Lake Göygöl.

This is a list of lakes of Azerbaijan.

The list includes only natural lakes. Artificial lakes such as reservoirs are excluded from this list. The Caspian Sea, which is the largest lake on Earth by both area and volume and which borders Azerbaijan on the east, is also excluded from this list.

There are around 450 lakes in Azerbaijan. All of them are small in area and volume. There are only 5 lakes with a surface area of more than 10 km². Most of these lakes are fresh water, but some of them are salt lakes. In its origin, these lakes are tectonic lakes, landslide-dammed lakes, alluvial set lakes, delta set lakes, oxbow lakes, lagoons and so forth. The lakes can be divided into two major groups: mountain lakes and lowland lakes. In the mountainous areas, the lakes are tectonic lakes, landslide-dammed lakes and glacial lakes.

In the semi-arid Apsheron Peninsula, some lakes are salt lakes. During the dry summer months, heat from the Sun evaporates most of these lakes, leaving a salt layer behind.

== Lakes ==
| Lake | Surface Area (km²) | Volume (mln. m^{3}) |
|---|---|---|
| Lake Sarysu | 65.7 | 59.1 |
| Lake Ağgöl | 56.2 | 44.7 |
| Lake Böyükşor | 16.2 | 27.5 |
| Lake Agzybirçala | 13.8 | 10.0 |
| Lake Candar | 10.6 | 51.0 |
| Lake Hajikabul | 8.4 | 12.1 |
| Lake Böyük Alagöl | 5.1 | 24.3 |
| Lake Aschyk | 1.76 | 10.2 |
| Lake Göygöl | 0.79 | 24.0 |
| Lake Bulbula | 0.70 | 1.5 |
| Lake Karaçuk | 0.45 | 2.53 |
| Maralgöl | 0.23 | |
