= Lake Masazir =

Lake in Masazir, Azerbaijan

- Masazirgol; Masazır gölü
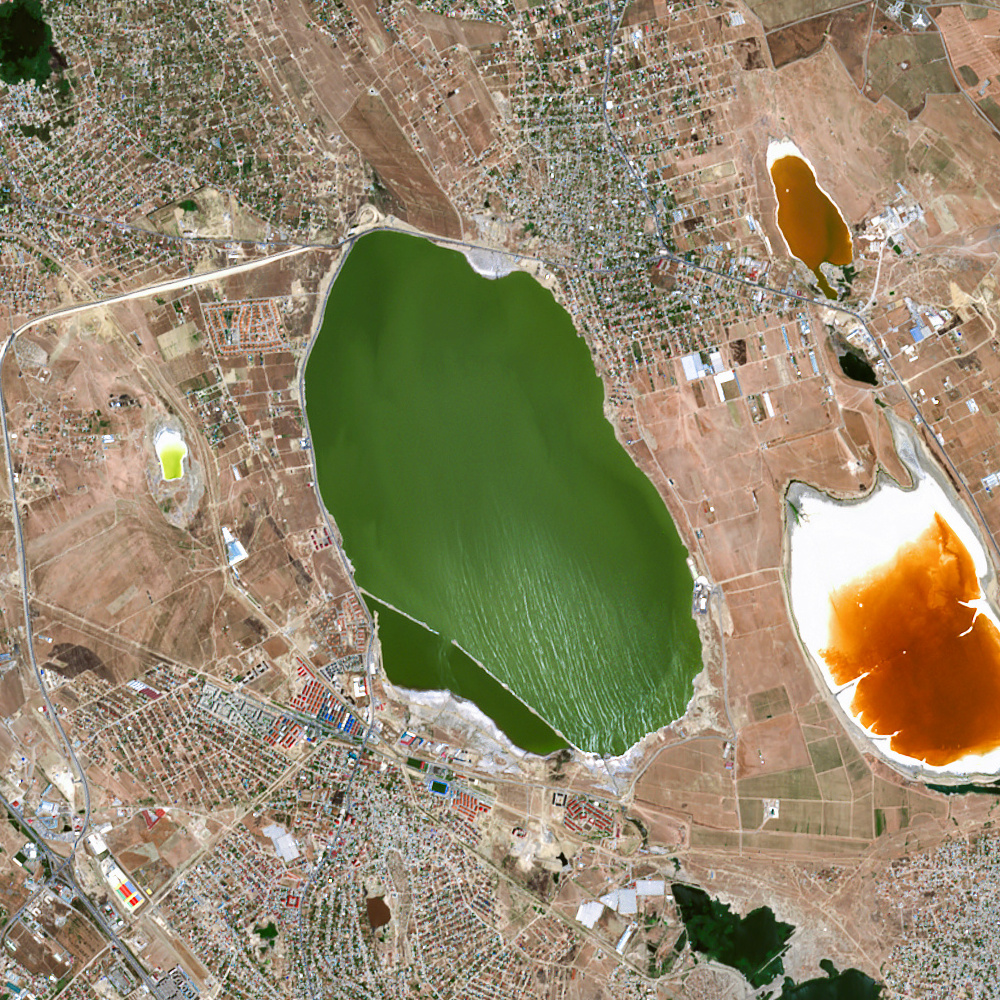
- Satellite photo of the lake

- Location within Azerbaijan
- Interactive map of Lake Masazir
- Location: Masazir, Azerbaijan
- Coordinates: 40°31′N 49°46′E
- Type: Endorheic lake
- Basin countries: Azerbaijan
- Surface area: 10 km^{2} (3.9 sq mi)

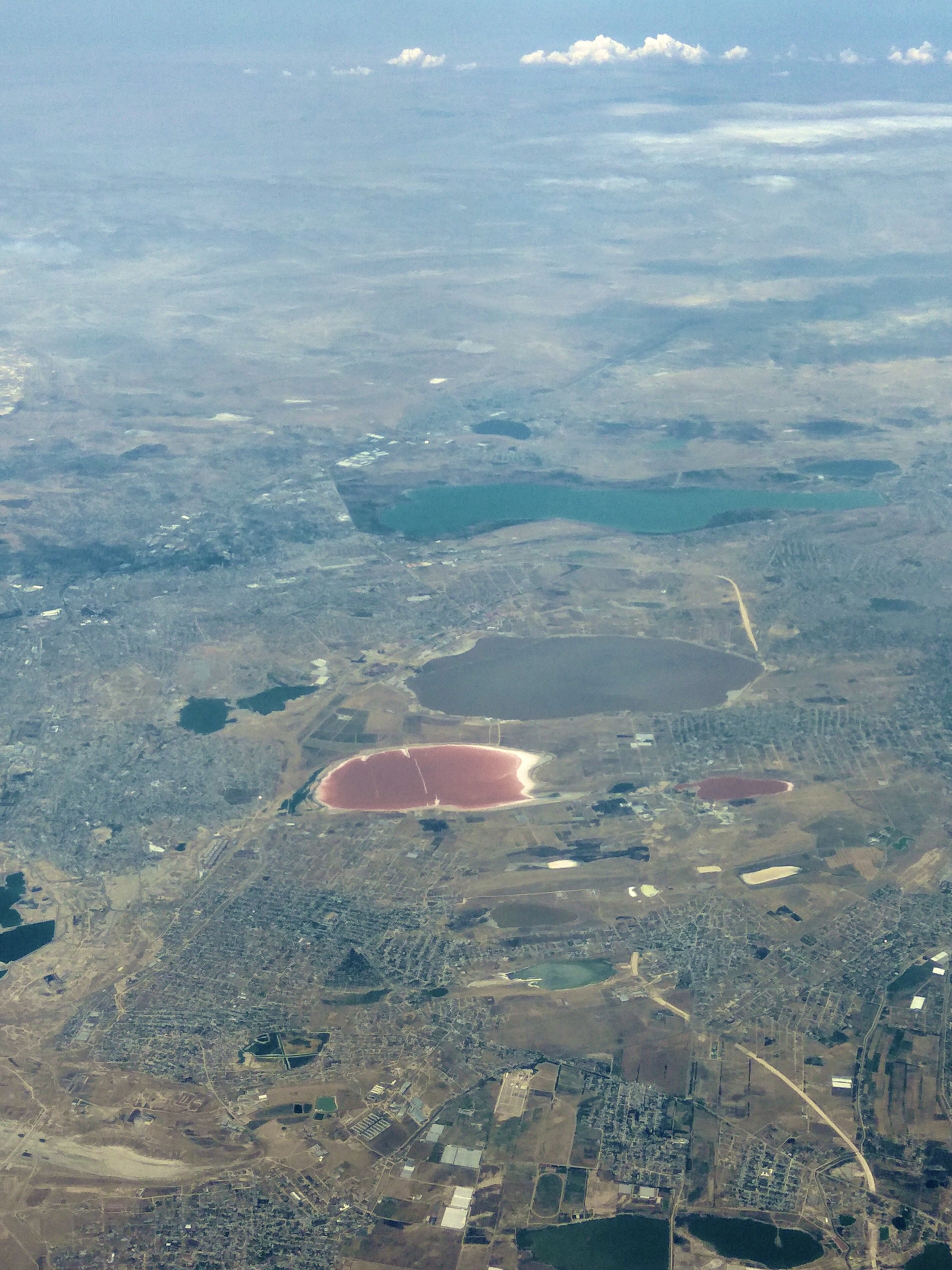
Lakes Masazır Gölü and Mirzələdi Gölü in Baku, Azerbaijan seen from a plane over Caspian Sea.

Lake Masazir (Azerbaijani: Masazır gölü), or Masazirgol, is a salty lake in Masazir, Azerbaijan, located on the Absheron Peninsula on the west coast of the Caspian Sea.

The overall area of the lake is 10 km^{2}. Large volumes of chloride and sulphate are concentrated in ion composition of the water. A new salt making plant was built here in 2010 for production of 2 Azerbaijani brands of salt. The estimated amount of recoverable salt is 1,735 million tons. It is available in liquid (water) and clay forms.

== Salt production ==
Salt extraction from the lake started in 1813. The salt is obtained either from the surface as a salt layer or from water as a solution. In 2010, a new salt-making plant was constructed for production of two Azerbaijani brands of salt. The collected salt is sent off to be refined. The estimated amount of recoverable salt is 1,735 million tons. Masazir Salt Refinery is built near the lake.

== See also ==
- Refinery
- Masazir
- Salt Lakes
