= Bulbula (lake) =

Lake in Azerbaijan

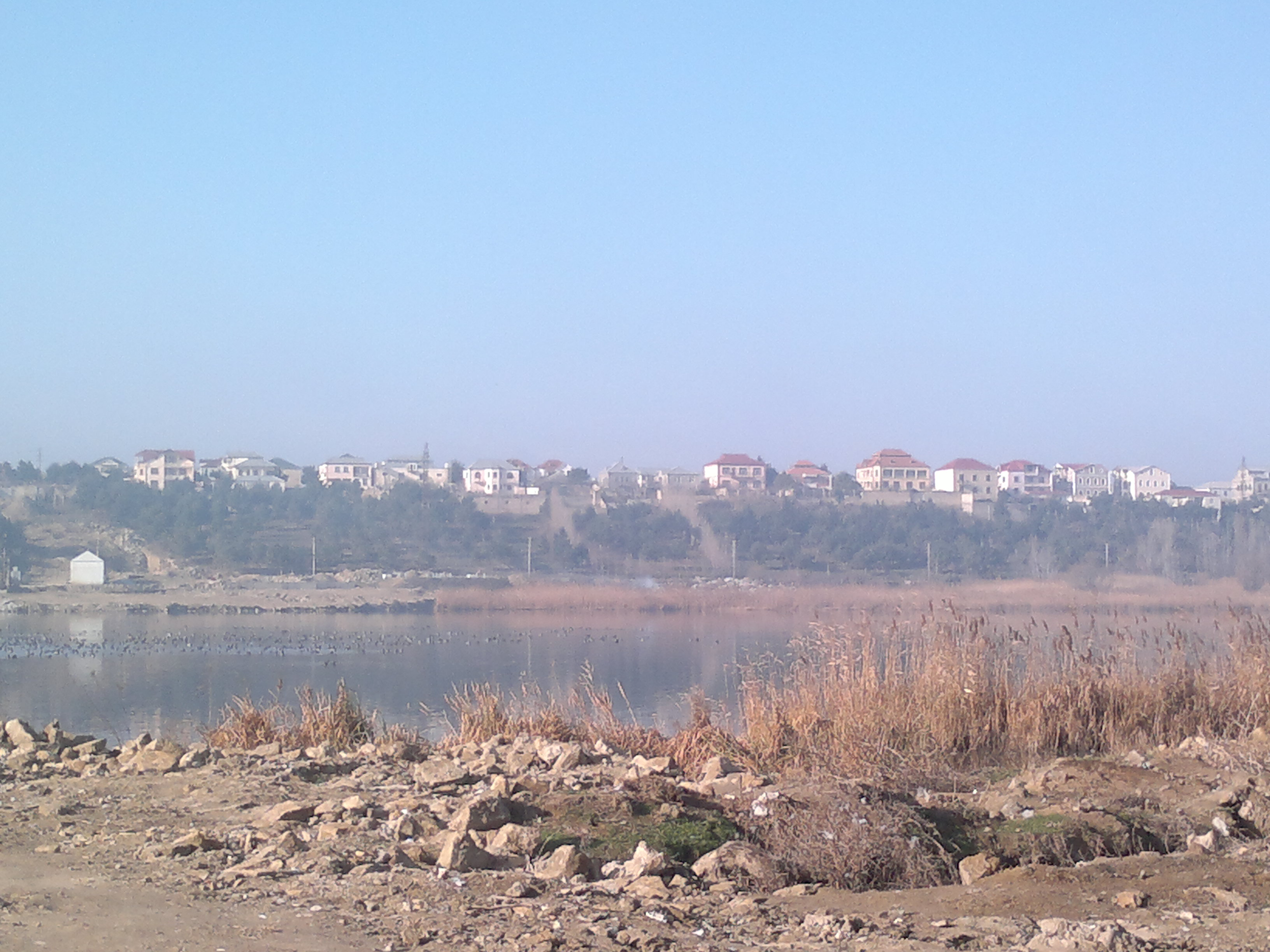

- Location within Azerbaijan
- Interactive map of Bulbula
- Location: Suraxanı, Baku, Azerbaijan
- Coordinates: 40°25′27″N 49°58′42″E
- Basin countries: Azerbaijan
- Max. width: 360 metres (1,180 ft)
- Surface area: 0.7 km^{2} (0.27 sq mi)
- Max. depth: 1.5 m^{2} (16 sq ft)
- Surface elevation: 8 metres (26 ft)

Bulbula (Azerbaijani: Bülbülə) is a lake in Azerbaijan, located on the Absheron Peninsula, between the villages of Bakikhanov and Amirjan at an altitude of 8 m above sea level.

According to its genesis, the lake Bulbula belongs to a tectonic group. The concentration of total nitrogen in the bottom sediments of the lake averages 0.18 mg/100 g.

The lake mirror area is 0.7 km^{2}, the maximum width is 360 m, the maximum depth is 1.5 m, the average depth is 1.1 m, and the length of the coastline is 6 km.

== See also ==
- Lake Mehman
- Agzybirchala
