= Heydar Aliyev International Airport =

International airport in Azerbaijan

Heydar Aliyev International Airport Heydər Əliyev adına Beynəlxalq Hava Limanı

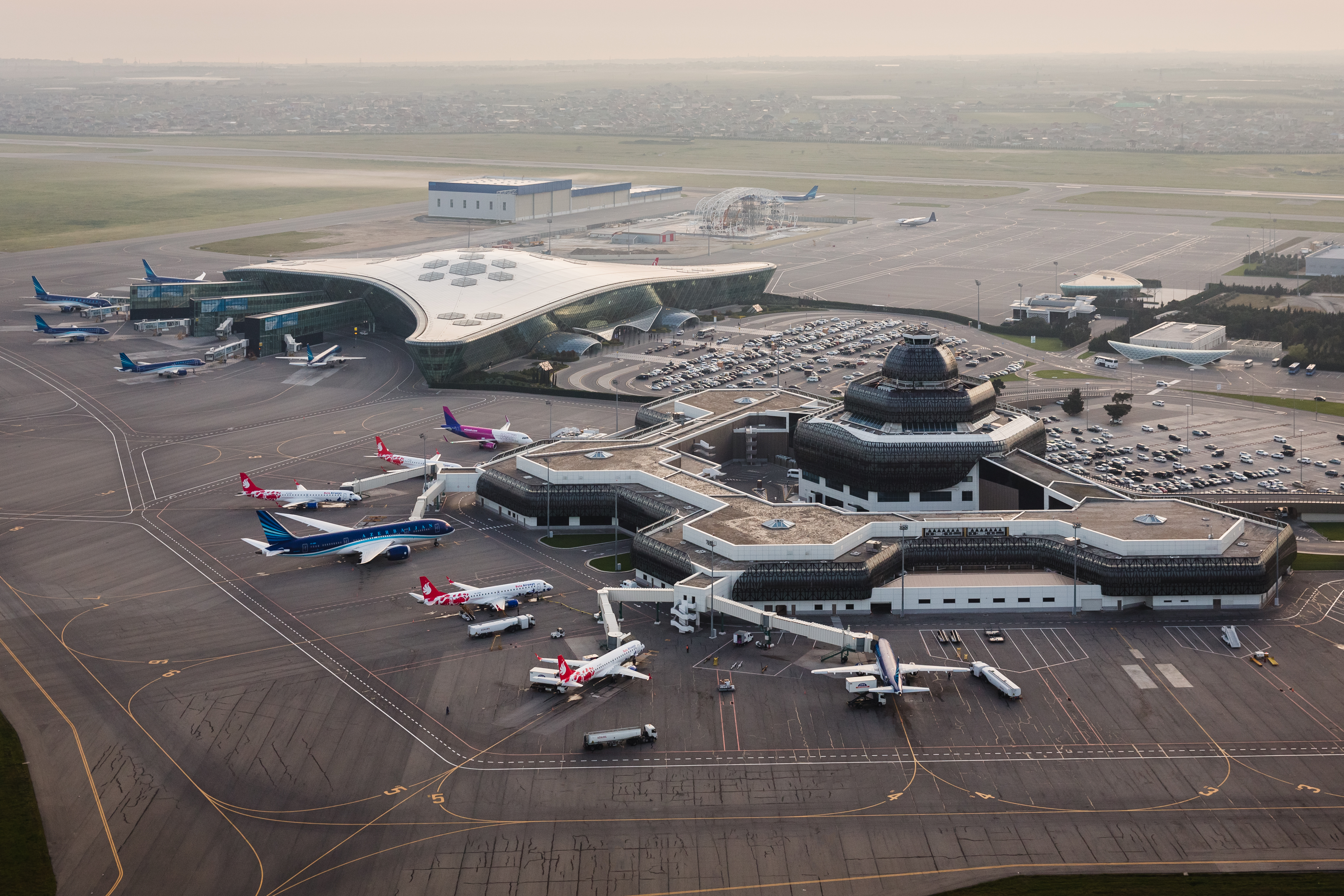
- View of Terminal 2 (front) and Terminal 1 (back)
- IATA: GYD; ICAO: UBBB

Summary
- Airport type: Public
- Owner: Government of Azerbaijan
- Operator: Azerbaijan Airlines
- Serves: Baku
- Location: Khazar, Baku, Azerbaijan
- Opened: 1933; 93 years ago
- Hub for: Azerbaijan Airlines; Azal Avia Cargo; Silk Way West Airlines; ASG Business Aviation; Silk Way Airlines
- Elevation AMSL: 3 m (9.8 ft)
- Coordinates: 40°28′03″N 050°02′48″E
- Website: airport.az

Map
- Location in Azerbaijan GYD/UBBB (Asia)

Runways
Direction	Length		Surface
Direction	m	ft	Surface
16/34	4,000	13,107	Asphalt/concrete
17/35	3,200	10,499	Asphalt/concrete

Statistics (2024)
- Passengers: 7,537,000
- Passenger change: ▲31.0%
- Flights: 59,238
- Source: Heydar Aliyev Intl. Airport, Azernews.az, Azerbaijani AIP at EUROCONTROL, ACI 2014 World Airport Traffic Report

Heydar Aliyev International Airport (Azerbaijani: Heydər Əliyev adına Beynəlxalq Hava Limanı; IATA: GYD, ICAO: UBBB) is an international airport serving Azerbaijan's capital, Baku, and one of the seven international airports of Azerbaijan. It is the busiest airport both in Azerbaijan and in the South Caucasus as well as one of the busiest in the post-Soviet countries. Formerly, it was called Bina International Airport, named after a suburb of Bina located within the metropolitan area of Baku. The airport is 20 kilometers northeast of Baku, connected to the city by Baku Airport Highway. It serves as the hub for national carrier Azerbaijan Airlines as well as for Azal Avia Cargo and Silk Way West Airlines.

== History ==
Baku Airport began operations in 1933, when the first flight to Moscow over the Caucasus Mountains took place. The Baku–Moscow route was established in 1937, offering daily service for 15 passengers. A year later, in 1938, flights to Rostov and Grozny were also introduced. After World War II, service to Ashgabat became available to the public. In 1955, the airport expanded its fleet with the addition of a multi-seat Ilyushin Il-14 aircraft. On 20 June 1959, the Ilyushin Il-18 made its first flight on the Baku–Moscow route.

On 9 February 1964, a new passenger terminal complex was opened and put into operation at Baku Airport.

On 31 August 1990, Baku Airport gained international status and opened up for flights outside the Soviet Union, which dissolved a year later in 1991. In October 1997, the presentation of a new passenger terminal was held, which was attended by the President of the Republic of Azerbaijan Heydar Aliyev. The newly opened terminal was soon known as Terminal 2. A year later, in 1998, a new runway was opened. The new passenger terminal complex was put into operation in 1999. Its ceremony was attended by Heydar Aliyev, and President of Turkey Suleyman Demirel. The same year, a new air traffic control (ATC) center at Baku Airport was put into operation, and the new Aviation Petrol Complex (TC1) commenced its operations as well.

On 10 March 2004, by decree of the President of the Republic of Azerbaijan, the airport was renamed after Heydar Aliyev, the long-standing Soviet party boss in the Azerbaijan Soviet Socialist Republic and later president of Azerbaijan.

On 7 May 2004, a new passenger terminal for domestic flights at Heydar Aliyev International Airport was put into operation. Currently, it serves as a major hub for domestic flights within the country, flying to cities such as Ganja and Nakhchivan. In March 2005, Baku Cargo Terminal (BCT) was opened. The opening ceremony was attended by the President of the Republic of Azerbaijan Ilham Aliyev.

President of Azerbaijan Ilham Aliyev attended the groundbreaking ceremony of a new terminal building at the airport on 17 March 2011 and reviewed the progress of construction that December. On 20 April 2012, a new runway at the airport was opened. The opening ceremony was attended by the President of the Republic of Azerbaijan, Ilham Aliyev, who was briefed on the reconstruction and construction works at the existing air terminal complex. A new hangar complex of Silk Way Technics and the International Logistics Centre opened on 6 May 2013. Ilham Aliyev observed and reviewed two new Airbus A340-500 passenger liners. That October, a new building of the main air traffic control center of the AZANS Air Traffic Department under the Azerbaijan Airlines closed joint-stock company was held.

The opening of Terminal 1 of the Heydar Aliyev International Airport was held on 23 April 2014. The President of the Republic of Azerbaijan, Ilham Aliyev, and members of his family attended this ceremony. The first flight from Terminal 1 took place the same day, with the plane departing for Sabiha Gökçen International Airport in Istanbul. The airport gained a direct link to North America when Azerbaijan Airlines began flying to New York City in September 2014.

In November 2014, the airport received Skytrax' 4-star rank. The airport received this rank again on 24 December 2016.

The opening ceremony of the Azerbaijan Efficiency, Strategy, and Development Center (ASEC) took place at Heydar Aliyev International Airport on 8 November 2018.

In March, the airport would be recognized as the "Best Airport of the Countries of CIS." The airport was named the "Best Airport among Airports in Russia and the CIS Countries" for the second time at Skytrax World Airport Awards 2018. On 7 May 2018, Heydar Aliyev International Airport was awarded a 5-star Regional Airport title by Skytrax.

On 11 May 2020, Heydar Aliyev International Airport's status of the "Best Airport among Airports in Russia and the CIS Countries" was confirmed and assigned by Skytrax. On 12 April 2021, the airport received the highest rating for safety measures against the COVID-19 pandemic. In 2022, Heydar Aliyev International Airport topped the ranking of the best airports in Central Asia and the CIS for the fifth time in a row, according to Skytrax World Airport Awards 2022. It won an award for the "Best Airport Staff in Central Asia and the CIS" the same year. On 16 March 2023, the airport was recognized as the “Best Regional Airport in Central Asia and the CIS” for the second time in a row. It won the “Best Airport Staff in Central Asia and the CIS” category as well.

On 26 October 2023, Heydar Aliyev International Airport made history and officially became the first airport in the world to completely switch to cloud technologies. April 2024 saw the airport once again win the prestigious Skytrax World Airport Awards 2024. It won the “Best Airport in Central Asia and the CIS” and “Best Airport Staff in Central Asia and the CIS" categories. On 19 April 2024, the airport joined the ranks of Airports Council International (ACI Europe), the only global organization of airport operators.

In March 2026, Heydar Aliyev International Airport became the winner of the Skytrax World Airport Awards 2026 in the "Best Airport in Central Asia and CIS" category.

== Facilities ==
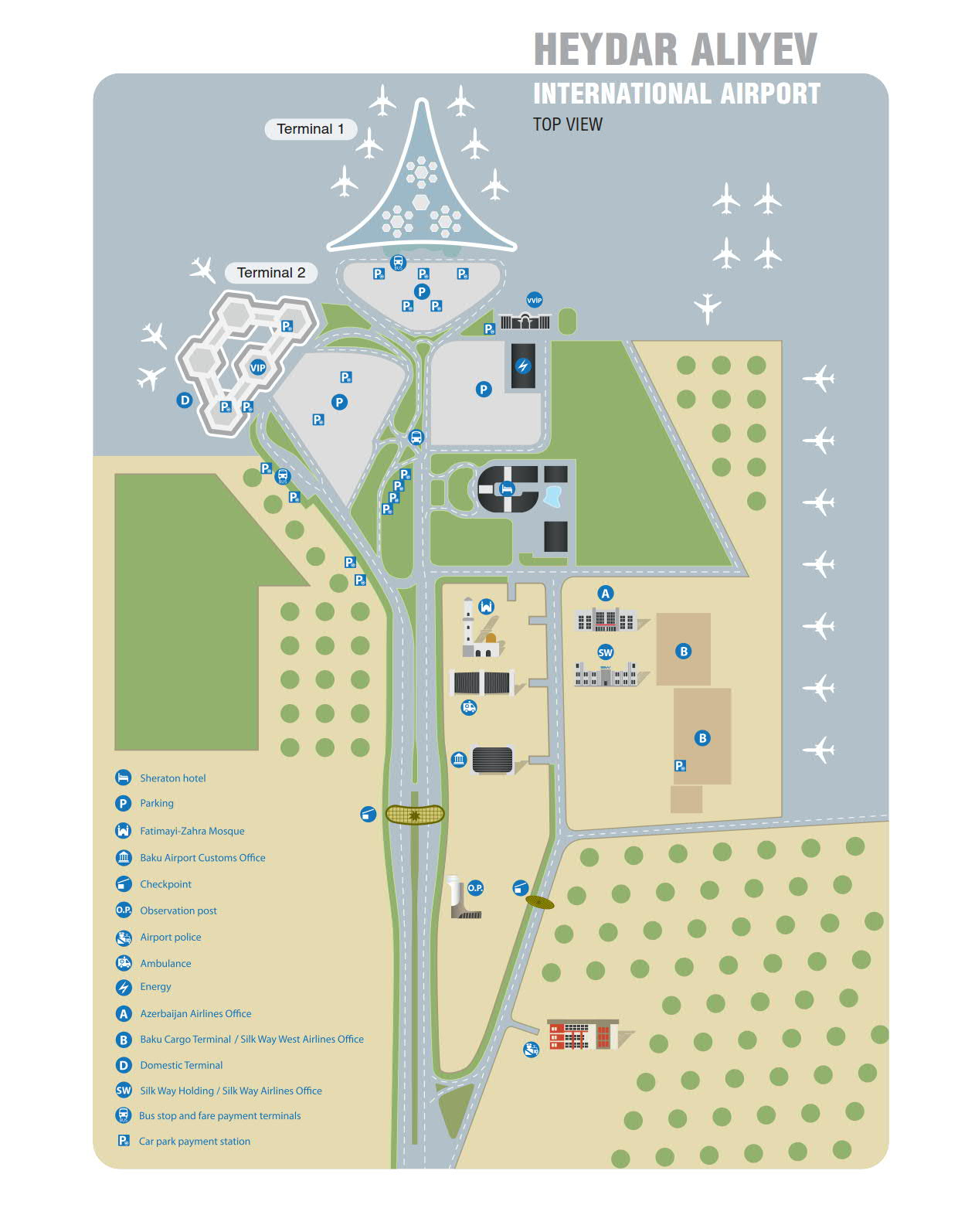
Plan map of Heydar Aliyev International Airport

=== Terminals ===
The airport consists of two passenger terminals, with Terminal 1 being the newer one. Terminal 1 primarily serves international flights, handling the majority of the airport's passenger traffic. In contrast, Terminal 2 prioritizes domestic and short-range flights. Due to its role in accommodating international travelers, Terminal 1 is the busier of the two terminals, seeing a higher volume of passengers throughout the year.

==== Terminal 1 ====
Terminal 1 was commissioned in April 2014. Its total area is 65,000 square meters (700,000 sq ft). The terminal is designed for 6 million passengers per year. It includes 12 boarding bridges, 15 gates, 40 check-in desks, 24 passport control desks, and 4 baggage carousels. It currently serves up to 3 million passengers annually. The total parking area is 20,000 square meters (220,000 sq ft) for 600 vehicles. The airport has a wide range of shops, restaurants, cafés, and duty-free stores in both the departures and arrivals areas. Terminal 1 contains five lounges and a spa. Terminal 1 operates jet bridges capable of receiving 12 aircraft simultaneously. Two jet bridges are intended for accommodating the world's largest passenger aircraft, the Airbus A380.

The four-level engineering design of Terminal 1 was developed in 2010 by the Arup Group, featuring a tricorn shape and a semi-transparent roof. The interior, designed by the Turkish company AUTOBAN, includes a series of oak-veneer 'cocoons.' The terminal is equipped with a Vanderlande baggage handling system and L-3 equipment for baggage inspection, which uses scanners to produce layered images of an object's internal structure. Additionally, Terminal 1 houses 30 Schindler escalators and 21 elevators. The terminal also features a Building Management System (BMS), which automates various processes and operations typically found in modern buildings, forming the backbone of an intelligent building. Furthermore, Terminal 1 is supported by a separate system for essential resources such as electricity, lighting, ventilation, heating, air conditioning, water supply, and sewage.

==== Terminal 2 ====
Terminal 2 is located approximately 200 meters away from Terminal 1. The terminal features 4 gates, 10 passport control desks, 4 baggage carousels, and 48 check-in desks. Architect Viktor Denisov is the creator of the project of Terminal 2, which currently serves both domestic flights (south entrance) and international flights of low-cost airlines (north entrance). The project was awarded the first prize in a competition in 1981 and was implemented in 1989.

==== Cargo ====
The cargo terminal was opened on 23 March 2005. That same year, the Baku Cargo Terminal became a member of the International Air Transport Association (IATA) for Ground Handling and took part in the International Business Partners Program of the Airports Council International (ACI). The terminal building houses companies such as Silk Way Airlines, Imair Air Company, Euroasian Air Services, Lufthansa Cargo and Panalpina. The terminal claims to be able to serve nine Boeing 747, Antonov An-124 fifteen Ilyushin Il-76 or two Boeing 777-type aircraft simultaneously.

=== Runways ===
The airport has two near-parallel runways; Runway 16/34 is 4,000 by 60 m (13,120 by 200 ft), while Runway 17/35 is 3,200 by 45 m (10,499 by 148 ft). Runway 16/34 is located on the western side of the airport, while Runway 17/35 is positioned on the eastern side. Runway 17/35 was put on hold, and resumed operations following a major refurbishment project that began in January 2024. The work included replacing the artificial asphalt concrete pavement, upgrading the Instrument Landing System (ILS), improving drainage, repairing existing taxiways, and adding three new taxiways.

== Airlines and destinations ==
=== Passenger ===
Airlines	Destinations
Aegean Airlines	Seasonal: Athens
Air Arabia	Abu Dhabi, Sharjah
Air Astana	Almaty, Atyrau
Airblue	Lahore
Air Cairo	Sharm El Sheikh
Air Serbia	Belgrade
AJet	Ankara, Antalya, Istanbul–Sabiha Gökçen; Seasonal: Izmir
arkia	Tel Aviv
Azerbaijan Airlines	Almaty, Antalya, Aqtau, Aqtöbe, Astana, Astrakhan, Atyrau, Baghdad Bahrain, Barcelona, Batumi, Beijing–Capital, Berlin, Bishkek, Brussels (begins 8 May 2027), Chișinău, Dammam, Delhi, Dubai–International, Dushanbe, Fuzuli, Geneva, Islamabad, Istanbul, Istanbul–Sabiha Gökçen (ends 3 January 2027), Jeddah, Kars, Lahore, London–Gatwick, London–Heathrow, Malé, Milan–Malpensa, Minsk, Mumbai, Nakhchivan, Paris–Charles de Gaulle, Prague, Riyadh, Samarqand, Sharm El Sheikh, Şymkent, Tashkent, Tbilisi, Tel Aviv, Trabzon, Urgench, Vienna; Seasonal: Adana/Mersin, Bodrum, Dalaman, Heraklion, Izmir, Tivat; Seasonal charter: Cairo
azimuth	Astrakhan
Centrum Air	Tashkent
China Southern Airlines	Guangzhou, Ürümqi
Fly Baghdad	Baghdad
Flyadeal	Seasonal: Jeddah
FlyArystan	Aqtau
Flydubai	Dubai–International
FlyErbil	Erbil
Flynas	Seasonal: Jeddah, Riyadh
FlyOne	Tashkent
Gulf Air	Bahrain
IndiGo	Delhi
IrAero	Nizhnevartovsk, Orenburg, Perm; Seasonal: Chelyabinsk
Iran Air	Tabriz, Tehran–Imam Khomeini
Iran Airtour	Tehran–Imam Khomeini
Iraqi Airways	Sulaymaniyah
Kuwait Airways	Kuwait City
LOT Polish Airlines	Warsaw–Chopin
Lufthansa	Frankfurt
Pakistan International Airlines	Islamabad, Karachi, Lahore
Pegasus Airlines	Ankara, Antalya, Istanbul–Sabiha Gökçen, Izmir
Royal Jordanian	Charter: Amman–Queen Alia
Red Wings Airlines	Moscow-Zhukovsky, Yekaterinburg
S7 Airlines	Novosibirsk
Salam Air	Seasonal: Muscat
Turkish Airlines	Istanbul; Seasonal: Antalya
Uzbekistan Airways	Tashkent
Wizz Air	Bratislava, Budapest, Rome–Fiumicino

=== Cargo ===
Airlines	Destinations
Atlas Air	Delhi, Zaragoza
Nippon Cargo Airlines	Tokyo–Narita
Silk Way West Airlines	Amsterdam, Aqtau, Atyrau, Baghdad, Bagram, Bishkek, Chicago–O'Hare, Dallas/Fort Worth, Delhi, Dhaka, Djibouti, Dubai–Al Maktoum, Dubai–International, Hahn, Hong Kong, Istanbul, Istanbul–Sabiha Gökçen, Jakarta–Soekarno-Hatta, Kandahar, Kuwait City, Kuala Lumpur–International, London–Stansted, Los Angeles, Luxembourg, Maastricht/Aachen, Manila, Milan–Malpensa, Moscow–Sheremetyevo, Mumbai, New York–JFK, Oslo, Seoul–Incheon, Shanghai–Pudong, Singapore, Tbilisi, Tehran–Imam Khomeini, Tel Aviv, Tokyo–Narita, Ürümqi

== Statistics ==
As of 2024 it is the busiest airport in Azerbaijan as well as the 11th busiest in the Post-Soviet states.

Traffic by calendar year, official statistics
	Passengers
2016	3,260,000
2017	4,060,000
2018	4,430,000
2019	4,730,000
2020	1,030,700
2021	3,000,000
2022	4,400,000
2023	5,700,000
2024	7,537,000

== Ground transport ==
=== Bus ===
Heydar Aliyev International Airport is connected to central Baku via Aeroexpress buses, which operate between the airport (Terminals 1 and 2) and 28 May Metro Station. The service was launched in 2015, and runs from 06:00 to 23:15 with departures every 20 minutes, transitioning to 45-minute intervals overnight, with an average travel time of 30 minutes. Additionally, the BakuBus H1 line provides 24-hour service between the airport and the city center.

=== Taxi ===
The state-operated Baku Taxi service, operating TX4 and LEVC TX models, is available at designated stands outside Terminal 1. It is the only taxi service operating in the airport. Baku taxi cabs at the airport have a distinct red colour. Private taxi services offer transfers between Baku and the airport, typically completing the journey in approximately 20 minutes.

=== Parking ===
The airport provides over 2,000 parking spaces across Terminals 1 (835 spaces) and 2 (1,166 spaces), including designated areas for disabled passengers and commercial vehicles. Separate zones accommodate freight transport and buses.

=== Car rental ===
International car rental agencies such as Hertz (operating since 2014), Sixt (since 2020), and Avis Car Rental (since 1997) maintain counters at Terminal 1. These companies offer vehicles for short- and long-term user.

=== Rail ===
The Baku Metro system is linked to the Baku Suburban Railway at several key interchange points. The interchange stations are on the Red Line as well as the Green Line, providing easy access to the suburbs. As part of the Baku development plan until 2040, it is planned to increase the number of metro stations, but the construction of metro lines to the airport is not envisaged. However, according to Zaur Huseynov, Baku Metro CJSC chair, it is possible that the issue of the construction of a station that will serve the Heydar Aliyev International Airport will be raised after 2040.

There are two major transfer points to the suburb railway on the west side of the metro. 28 May Station of Red Line. Closest to 28 May is Jafar Jabbarli Station on the Green Line, the second point of transfer between passengers moving from metro to suburban railway. Since the two stations are so close together, there is an unbroken transfer from the metro to the suburban railway with no loss of travel disturbance for commuters.

To the east are a number of stations that connect transfer paths with the Baku Suburban Railway. Koroglu, which is one of the Red Line stations, is a major transfer point, particularly for passengers traveling to the eastern suburbs of Baku. The station is one of the city's major transport hubs with a large number of daily passengers. Another Bakikhanov Station on the emerging Green Line will also enhance connectivity by having another direct transfer to the suburban rail network. Upon completion, Bakikhanov will facilitate improved access to users of Baku's eastern districts. Gara Garayev Station is another one of the alternatives, as it is one of the closest Baku Metro stations to the airport.

Besides, other stops of the M-11 corridor will be transfer points in the future and will enhance the integration between the metro and suburban railway even more. Heydar Aliyev International Airport will also be eventually linked by Azerbaijan Railways to the Baku Suburban Railway. Officials have announced the construction of a Yeni Surakhani–Heydar Aliyev International Airport railway line as part of Azerbaijan's railway expansion. Officials report that approximately 400,000 passengers travel daily from the suburbs to the capital, increasing the demand for improved railway connections, including a direct link to the airport. The project aims to improve access to the airport by integrating it into the Baku Suburban Railway network. To support this development, authorities plan to increase train frequency on the Absheron Ring Road and commission the Guzdek-Qaradag railway to divert freight traffic. Additionally, previously inactive railway routes, including Bakikhanov–Bina–Qala–Yeni Surakhani–Hovsan, will be reactivated to enhance connectivity.

=== Road ===
Baku Airport Highway, often referred to as Mardakan Highway, serves as the main road that links the airport to the Baku Metropolitan Area, including the surrounding municipalities in close proximity to the airport, while Baku Airport Roundabout and Zykh-Airport Highway link the Khatai rayon and the municipality of Zykh to the airport. Baku Airport Highway pairs up with Boyuk Shor Highway. It begins at the Koroglu Metro station at the intersection of Heydar Aliyev Avenue with the Darnagul Highway, and continues east towards to the airport.

== See also ==
- Transport in Azerbaijan
- List of the busiest airports in the former Soviet Union
