= Binə, Baku =

Bina Binə
- Municipality
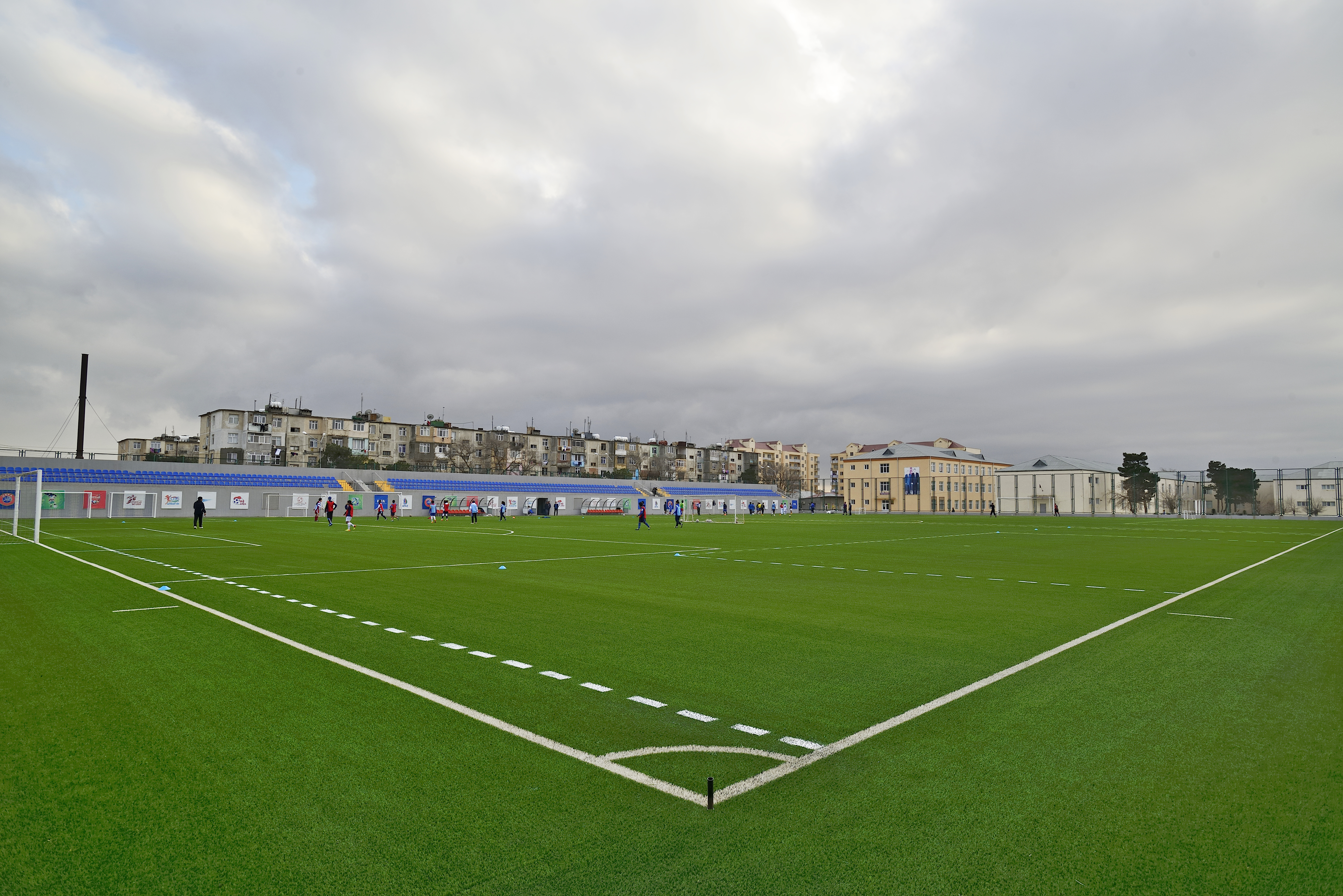
- Bina Stadium

- Location within Azerbaijan
- Coordinates: 40°27′14″N 50°04′35″E
- Country: Azerbaijan
- City: Baku
- District: Khazar

Population (2023)
  - Total: 80,133
- Time zone: UTC+4 (AZT)
  - Summer (DST): UTC+5 (AZT)

Binə (Bina) is a settlement and municipality in Baku, Azerbaijan. It has a population of 80,133. It is the nearest urban area to Heydar Aliyev International Airport, and was once home to one of the biggest markets in the country till that was moved to a location at the southernmost edge of Baku, near Lökbatan. The new market retains the name Binə Bazaar despite its lost geographical relevance.

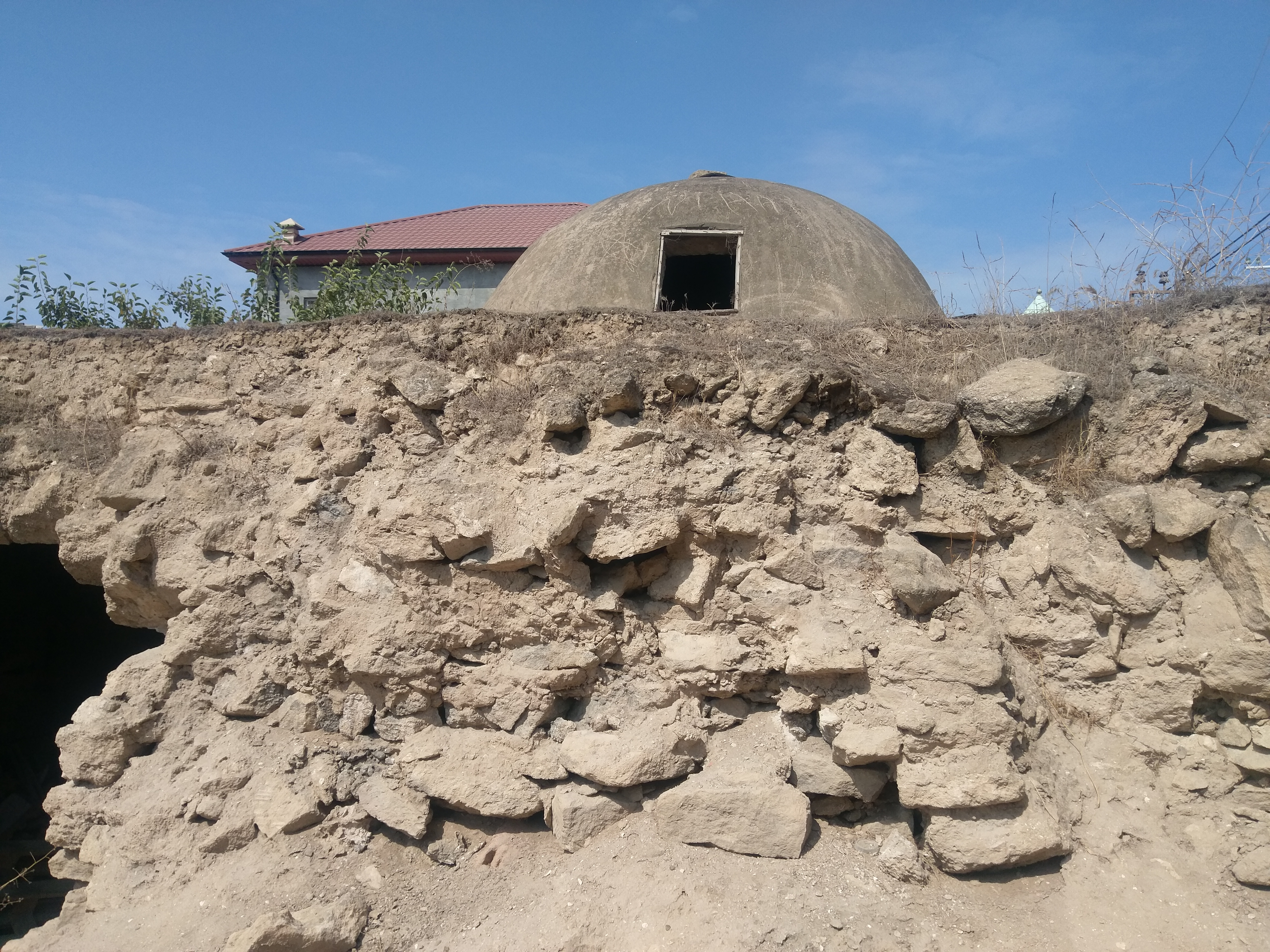
Old Bath

== Road ==
Baku Airport Highway

== Rail ==
Baku suburban railway station is planned here.

== Notable natives ==
- Movsum Salimov — Oil Magnate during 1918~1920 ( a historical figure associated with late 19th and early 20th-century Baku, Azerbaijan, and the oil industry (neft). He was a wealthy industrialist or "millionaire" during the oil boom of that era. )
