= Masazir =

Masazir Masazır
- Municipality
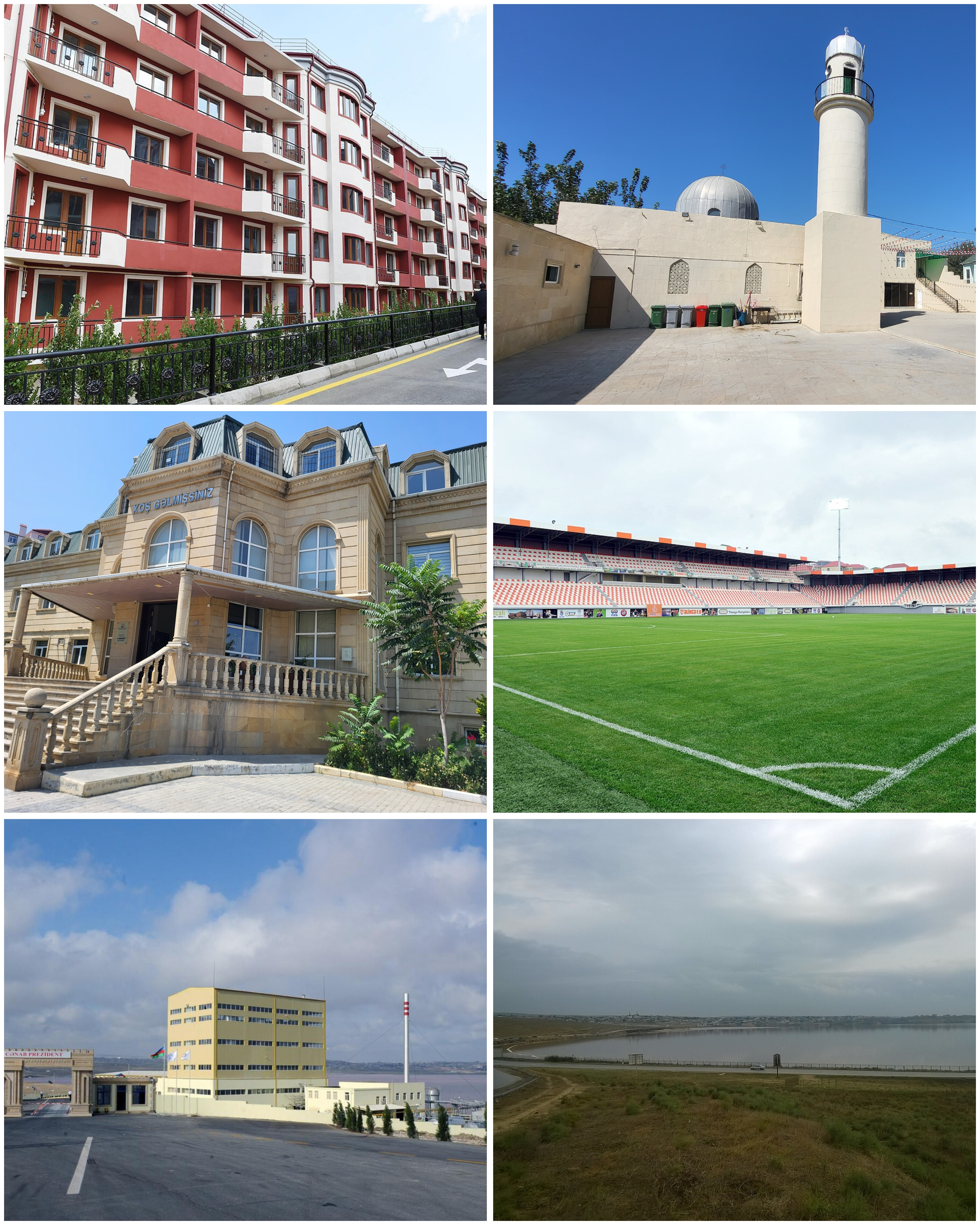
- Clockwise from top: New apartment blocks; Juma Mosque; Bank Respublika Arena; Salt factory; №3 middle school

- Location within Azerbaijan
- Coordinates: 40°28′57″N 49°45′35″E
- Country: Azerbaijan
- Rayon: Absheron

Population (2024)
  - Total: 18,967
- Time zone: UTC+4 (AZT)
  - Summer (DST): UTC+5 (AZT)

Masazir (Azerbaijani: Masazır; also Masazyr) is a settlement and municipality in the Absheron District of Azerbaijan. It has a population of 18,967 and lies on the Lake Masazir.

== Etymology ==
Masazir is composed of the Persian ماسه, maseh, 'sand' and the suffix زار, -zar, meaning place with sand. In written sources, other variants such as Musazir, Musadir or Mostazkhir are also found.

== History ==
In 1913, Masazir belonged to the Baku uezd. 1926, according to the administrative-territorial division of the Azerbaijan SSR, it was subordinated to the Binagadi District of Baku and in 1929, placed under the control of the Baku City Council of the Azerbaijan SSR, after the administrative divisions were abolished. According to the administrative division of 1961, Masazir was part of the Khirdalan settlement of the Kirov district. On January 4, 1963, it was integrated into the newly created Absheron district. According to the 1977 administrative territorial division, the settlement was part of the Khirdalan council of Absheron region. On May 25, 1991, Masazir council separated itself from the Khirdalan council. In 1999, an administrative reform was carried out in Azerbaijan, and the Masazir municipality of Absheron district was established within the Masazir administrative territorial circle.

A salt factory was built in Masazir in 2010, with the opening being attended by Ilham Aliyev. Additionally, since 2017, Masazir has its own football club Sabah FK, that play their games in the Bank Respublika Arena, built in 2014. The local Juma mosque was renovated in 2018.

== Population ==
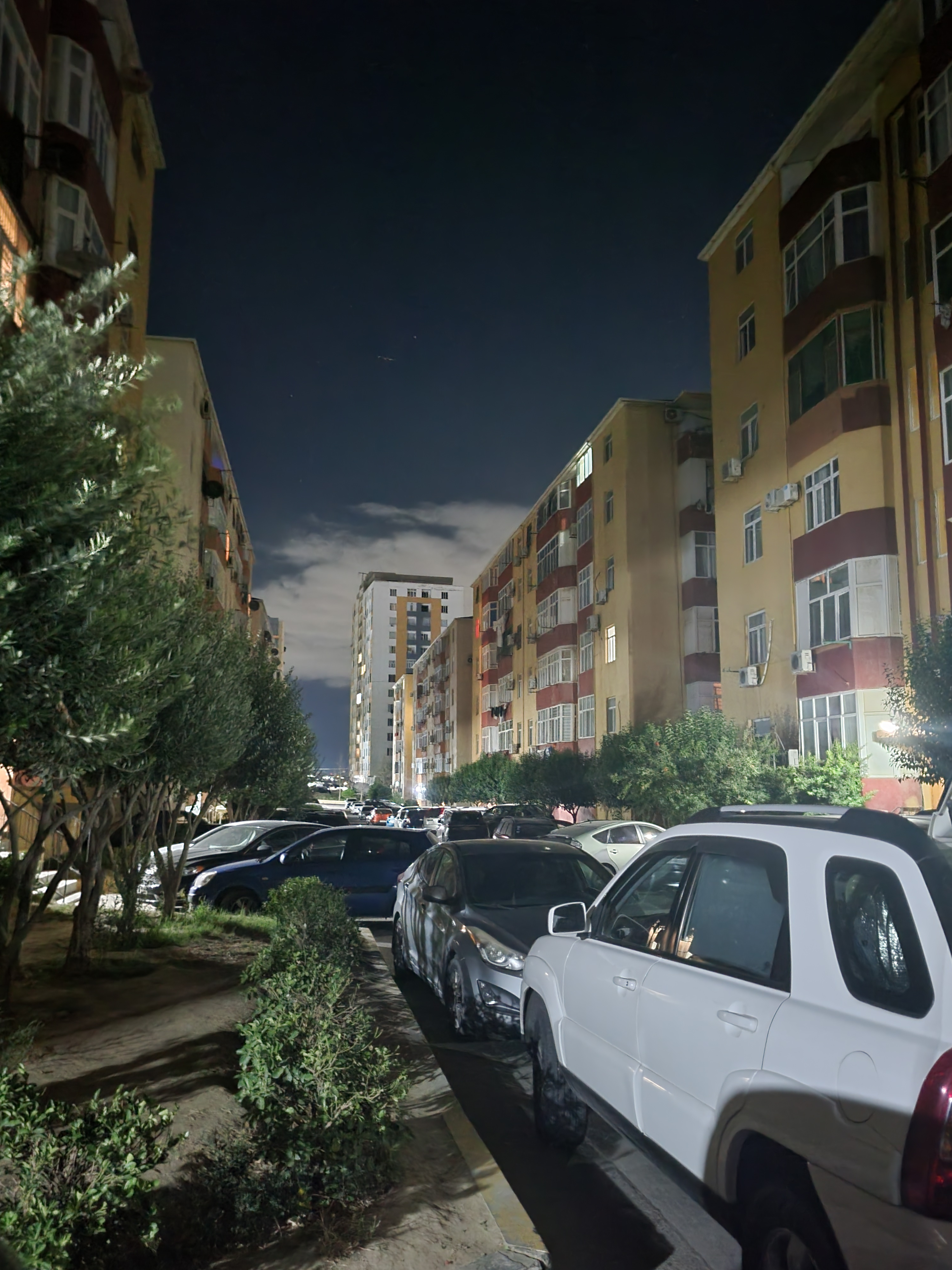
Qurtuluş 93, part of Masazir

In 1886, the population consisted of 663 Shia Tats. The population experienced a boom post independence, with the population rising to 2,337 in 1999 and then 10,817 in 2009. As of 2024, the population lies at 18,967.

== Geography and climate ==
The terrain around Masazir is flat towards the northeast, but towards the southwest it is hilly. The highest point nearby is Shabandagh, 354 meters above sea level, 8.0 km south of Masazir. Around Masazyr it is densely populated, with 982 inhabitants per square kilometer. The nearest larger community is Baku, 16.2 km southeast of Masazir. In the area around Masazyr there are unusually many named mountains. The surroundings around Masazir are essentially an open bush landscape. Climate in the area is temperate. Average annual temperature in the neighborhood is 17 °C . The warmest month is August, when the average temperature is 30 °C, and the coldest is December, at 6 °C. Average annual rainfall is 477 millimeters. The rainy month is November, with an average of 83 mm rainfall, and the driest is August, with 6 mm rainfall.
