= Bakıxanov =

- Municipality
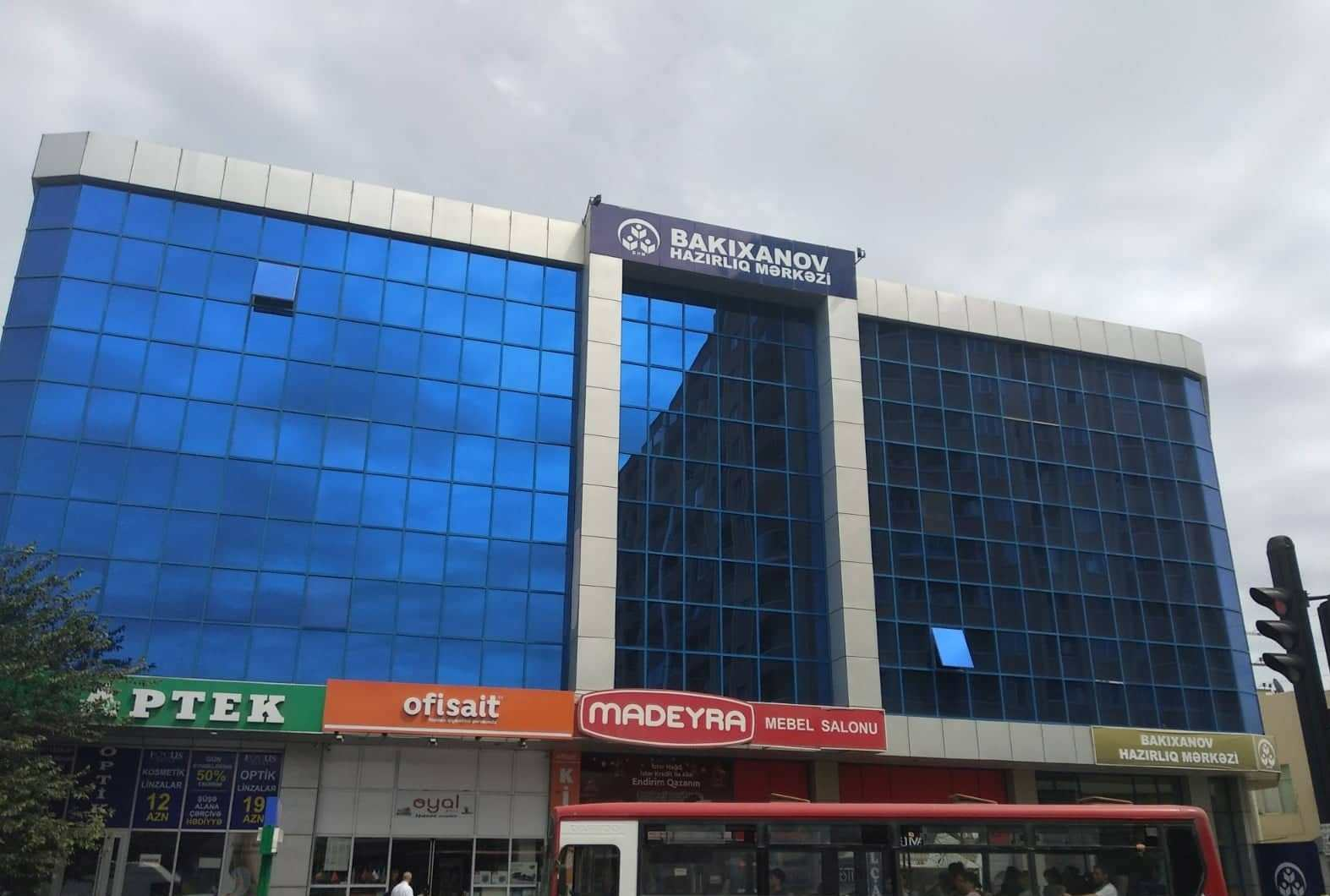
- Educational Training Center

- Location within Azerbaijan
- Coordinates: 40°25′18″N 49°57′52″E
- Country: Azerbaijan
- City: Baku
- District: Sabunchu

Population (2008)
  - Total: 73,680
- Time zone: UTC+4 (AZT)
  - Summer (DST): UTC+5 (AZT)

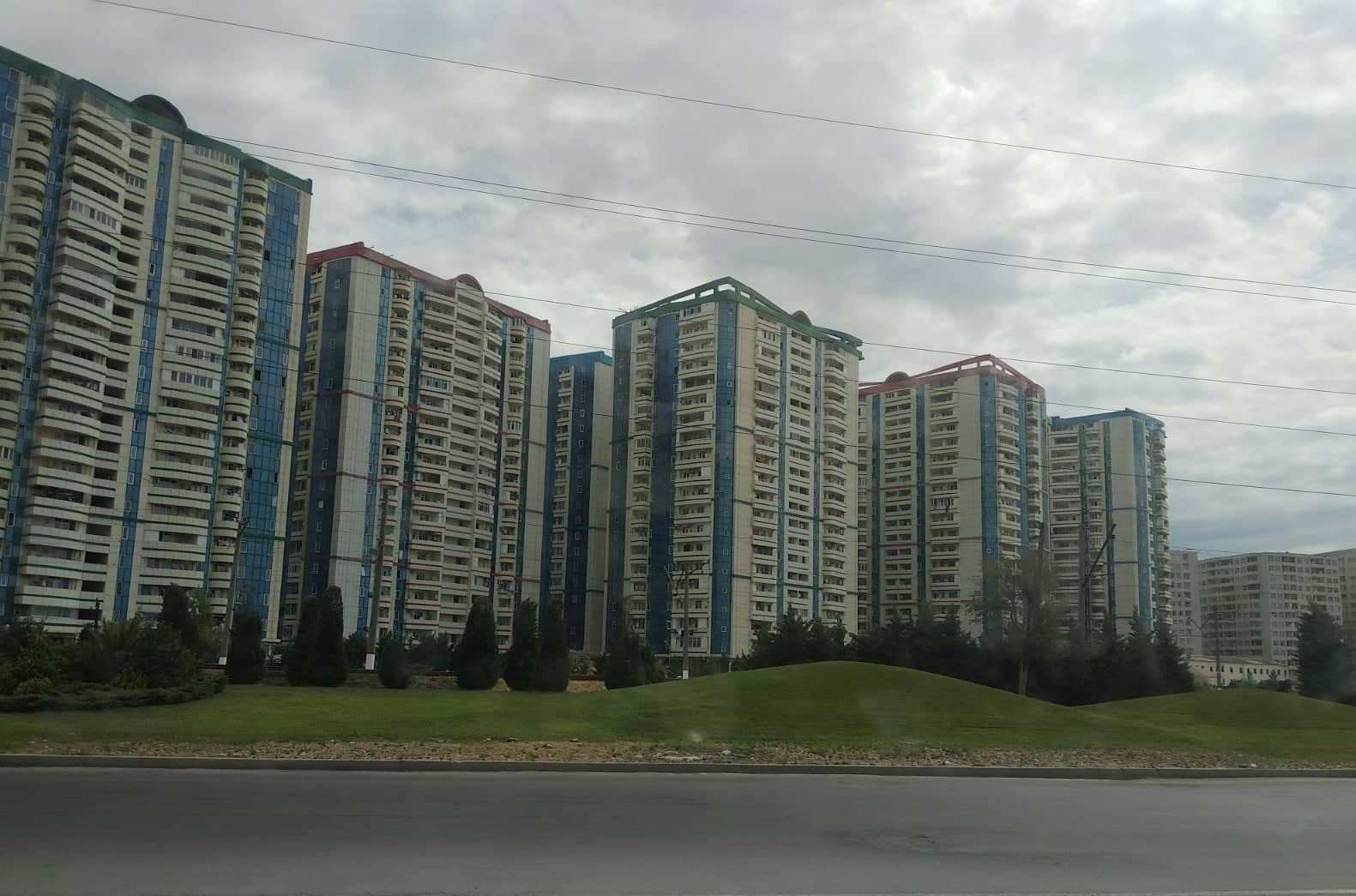
Youth Town in Bakikhanov settlement

Bakıxanov (Bakikhanov) is a settlement and municipality in Baku, Azerbaijan. It was named after Abbasgulu Bakikhanov and has a population of 71,600.

It contains a mosque and a public park. On the eastern side of the town is Bulbula Lake. Sabunchu lies near northwestern Bakıxanov.

Prior to 1992, it was known as Stepan Razin, named for the Cossack uprising leader Stepan Razin.

== Transportation ==
=== Road ===
Baku Airport Highway by pass Bakikhanov.

=== Railroad ===
The Bakixanov station of Baku suburban railway.

=== Metro ===
The Bakixanov Metro Station Y-22 in

- Green line
- Blue Line M-11

are planned in this area by Baku Metro in the future.

== Notable natives ==
Huseyn Derya - was an award-winning Azerbaijani rapper and actor.

== Gallery ==
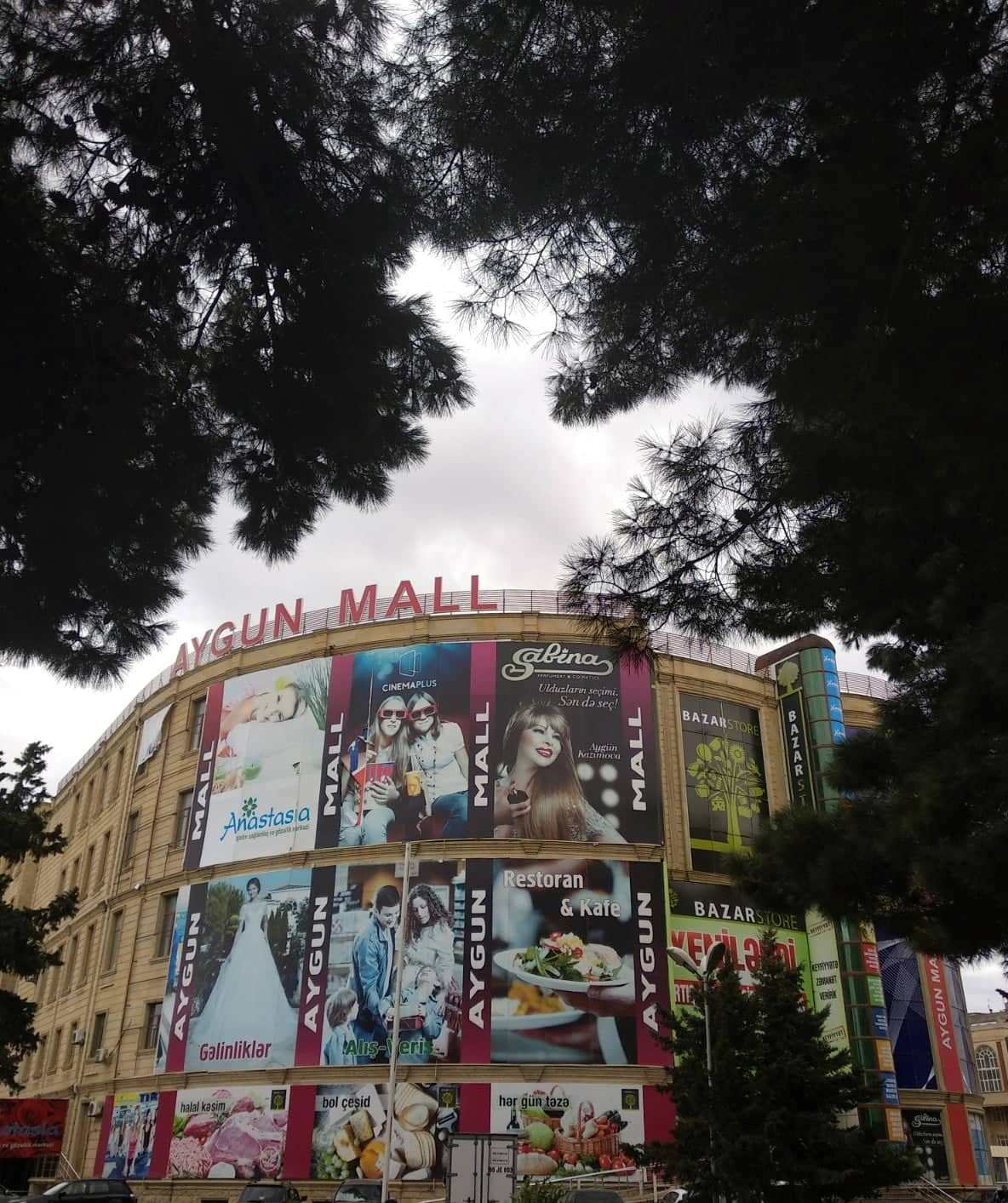

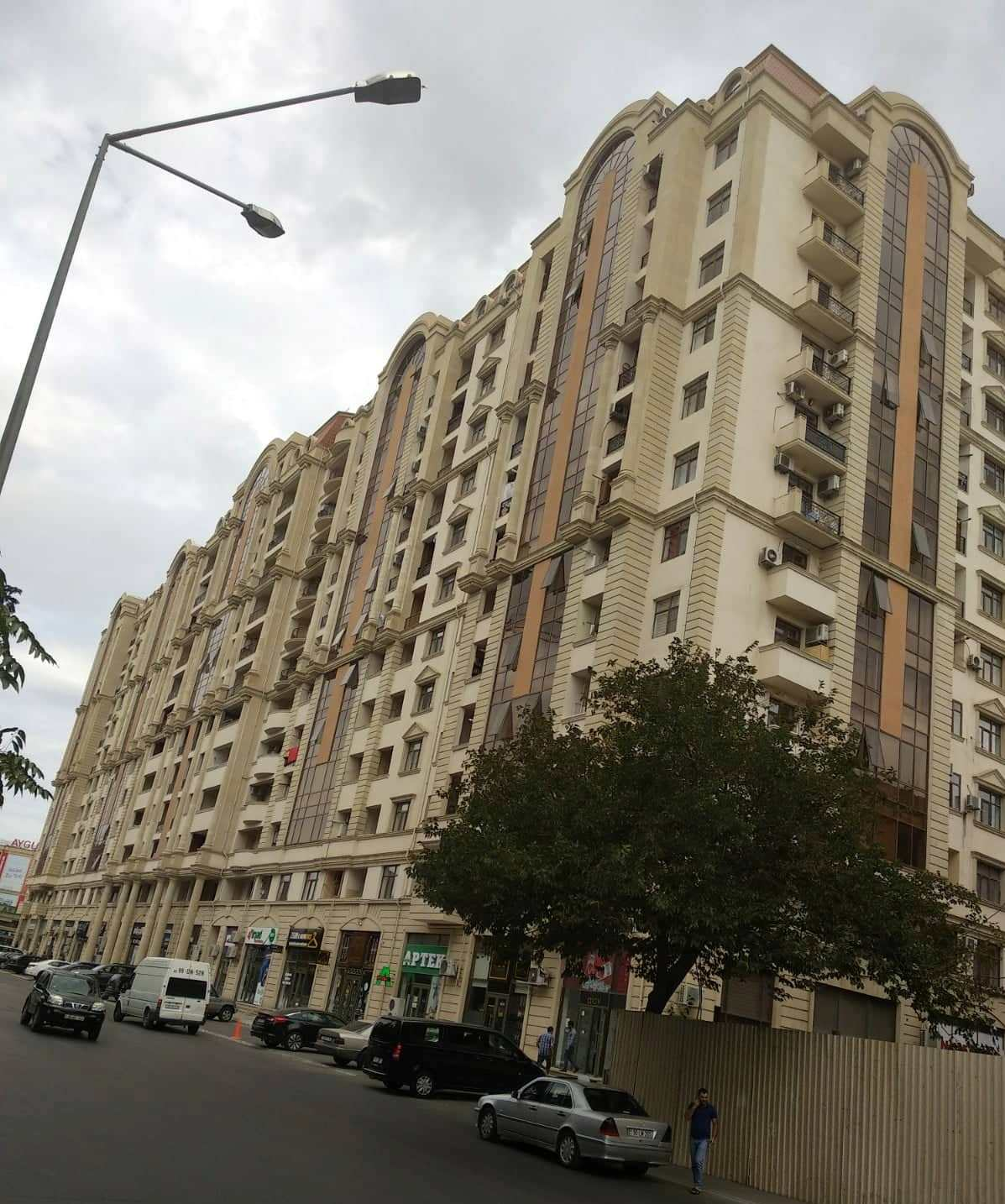

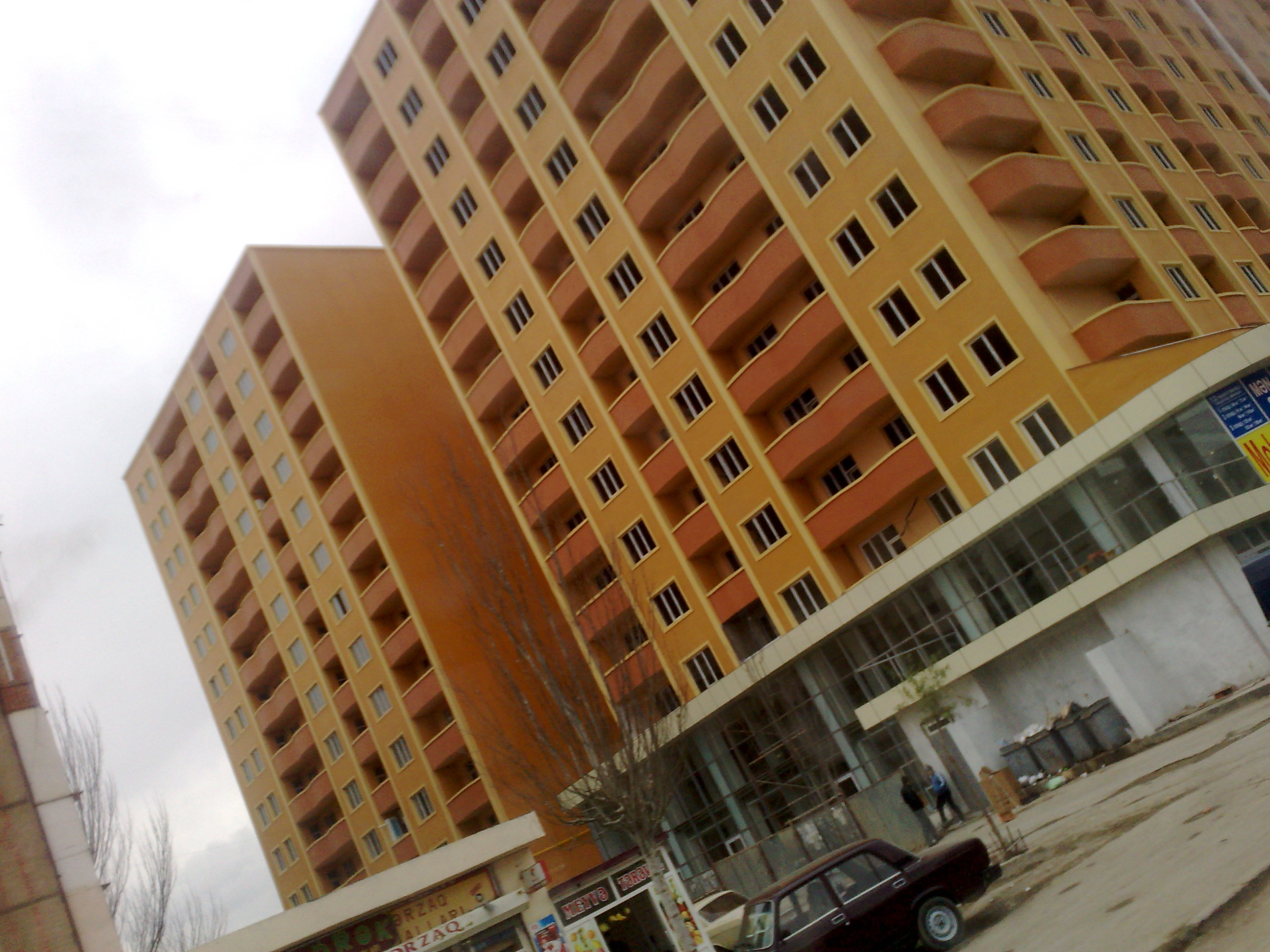

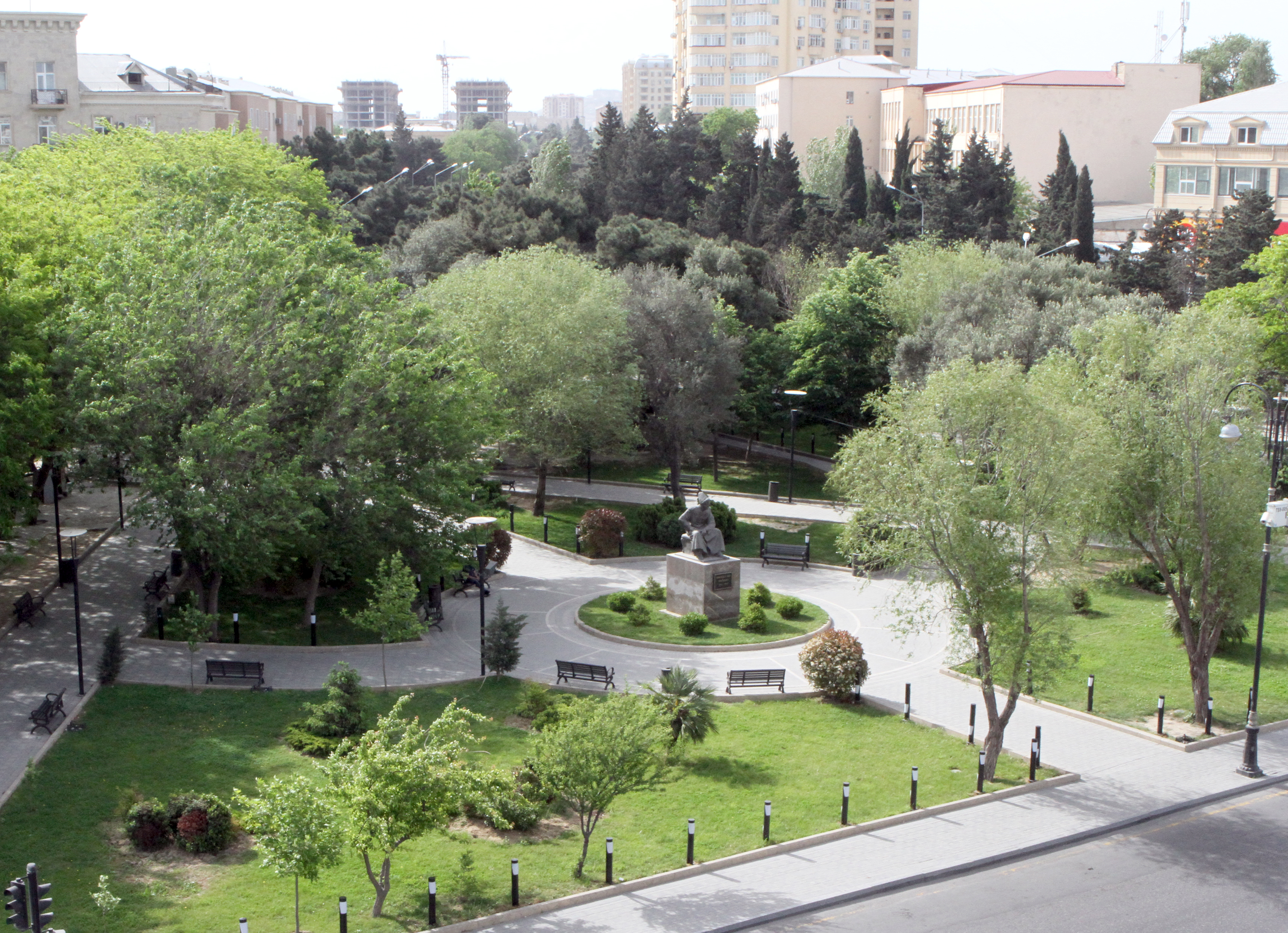

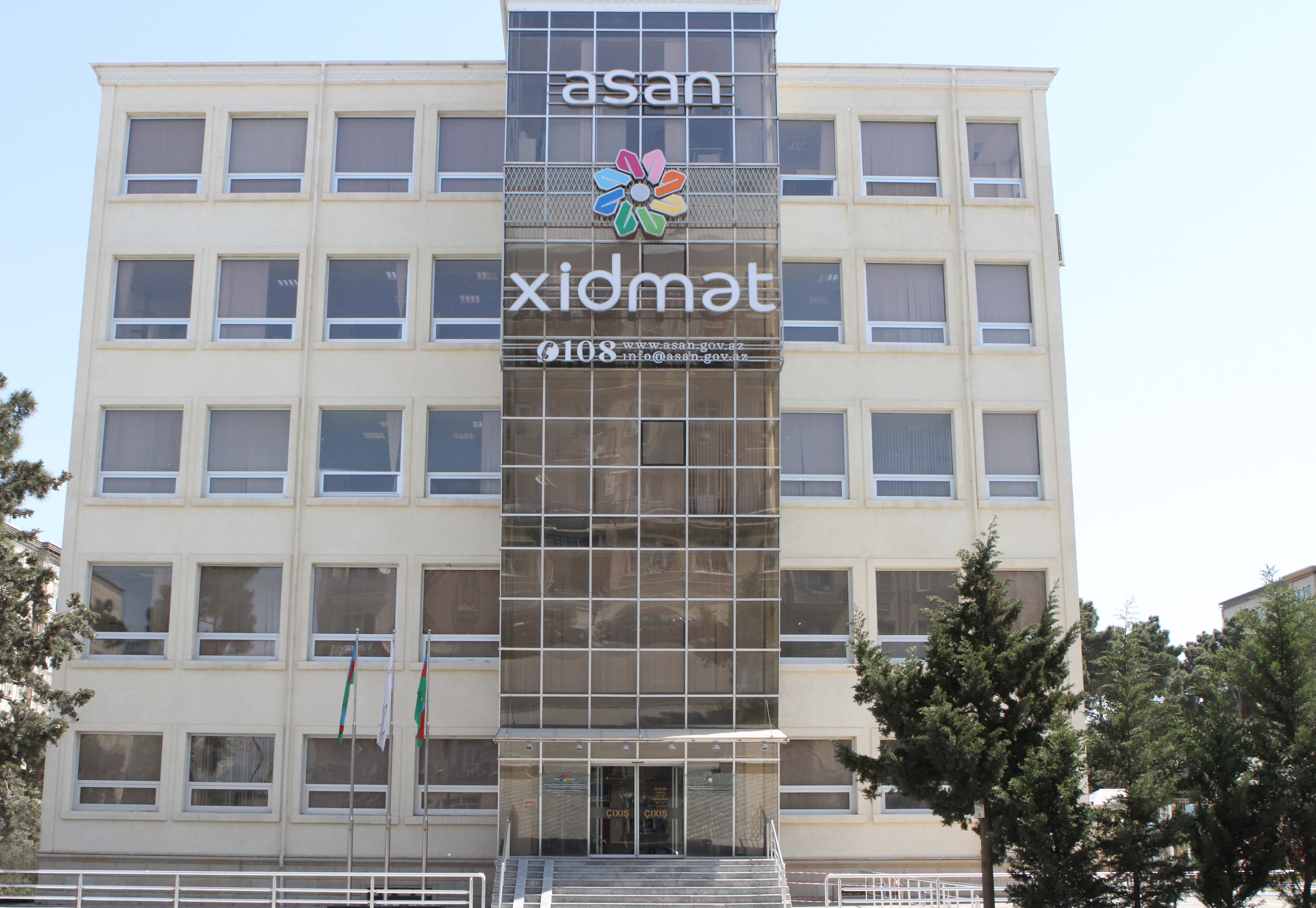
