= Boyuk Shor Highway =

Road in Baku, Azerbaijan

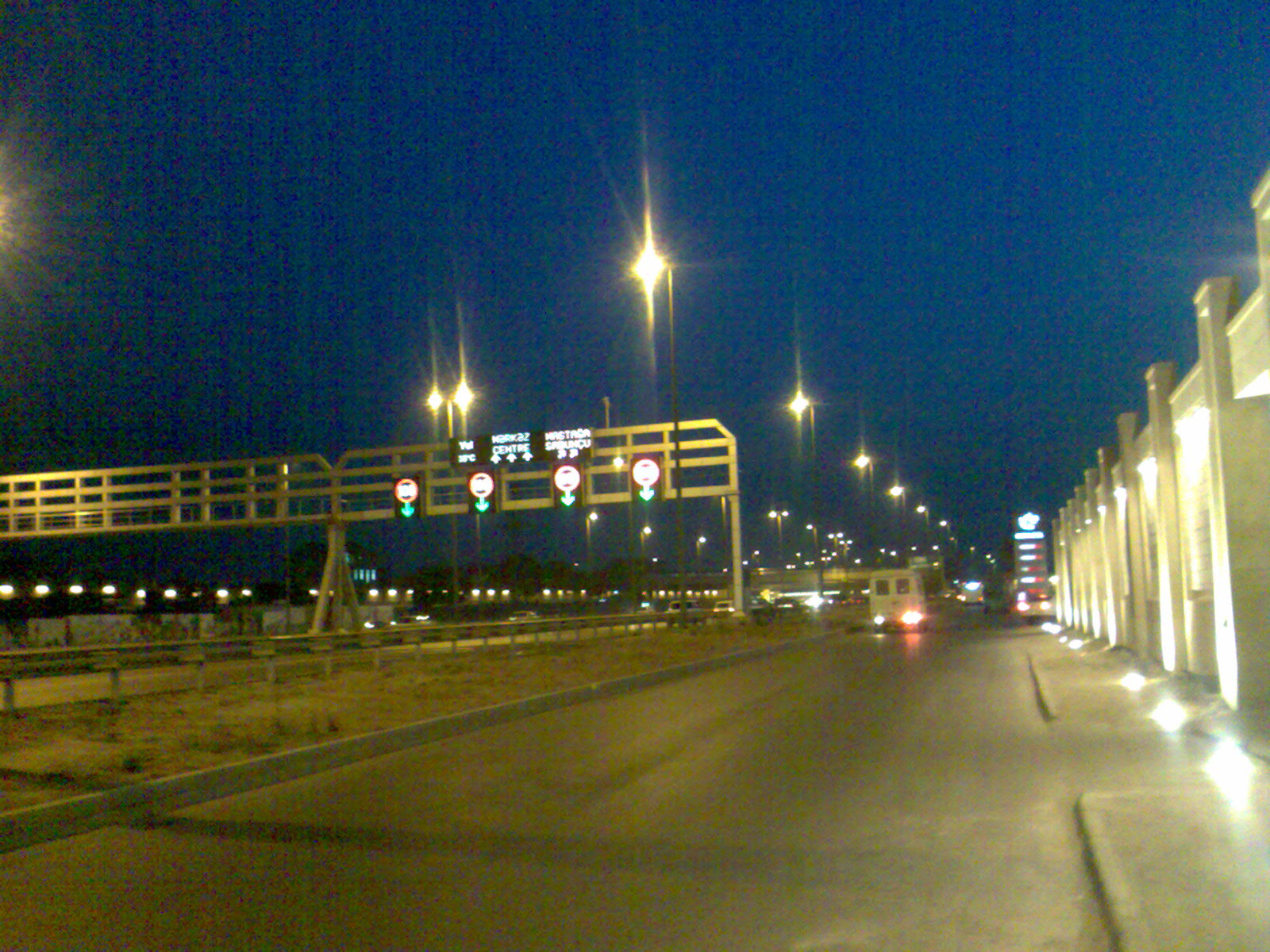
- Maintained by: City of Baku
- Location: Nizami raion, Baku
- East end: Baku Airport Highway
- Major junctions: Zabrat Highway
- West end: Koroğlu

Boyuk Shor Highway (Azerbaijani: Böyük Şor yolu) is a highway in Baku, Azerbaijan. It begins at the Koroglu Metro station with the intersection of Heydar Aliyev Avenue with the Darnagul Highway. It continues east towards Mardakan. It is named for nearby Lake Boyukshor though the lake is no longer visible from the highway due to the construction of the Olympic Stadium.

== History ==
Reconstruction and upgrading of the highway from Boyukshor roundabout to Heydar Aliyev International Airport, Baku city, km 0+000 ÷ km 12,2 2007 - 2010.

== Technical specifications of the road ==
4 lanes of the 8-12-lane road are the express roads, and they provide direct movement of the vehicles to the airport. In order to provide more convenient movement of vehicles in the area of settlements, 12-lane road from Boyukshor roundabout to Sabunchu roundabout and the 8-lane road from Sabunchu roundabout to the airport were constructed. The length of the road is 12,2 km.

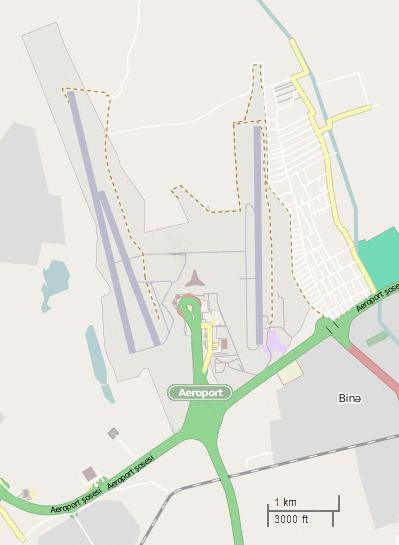
The Baku Airport Road and Airport Terminals Map

== Sources ==
- Boyuk Shore Highway
