= Azal Avia Cargo =

Azerbaijan airline

IATA	ICAO	Call sign
-	AHC	AZALAVIACARGO
- Founded: 1996
- Ceased operations: 2007
- Hubs: Heydar Aliev International Airport
- Fleet size: 4
- Destinations: 40
- Parent company: Azerbaijan Airlines
- Headquarters: Baku, Azerbaijan
- Website: www.azal.az

Azal Avia Cargo was a cargo airline based in Baku, Azerbaijan and a subsidiary of Azerbaijan Airlines. It operated scheduled and charter cargo services within Azerbaijan and to other CIS countries. Its main base was Heydar Aliev International Airport in Baku.

== History ==
The airline was established in 1996 and was wholly owned by Azerbaijan Airlines.

== Fleet ==
=== Current fleet ===
The Azal Avia Cargo fleet included the following aircraft (at March 2007):

- 2 Antonov An-12
- 1 Antonov An-26B

=== Previously operated ===
- 1 Antonov An-32
- 1 Ilyushin Il-76TD

== See also ==
- List of Azerbaijani companies
- Baku Cargo Terminal
