= Nizami raion =

Nizami
- Raion
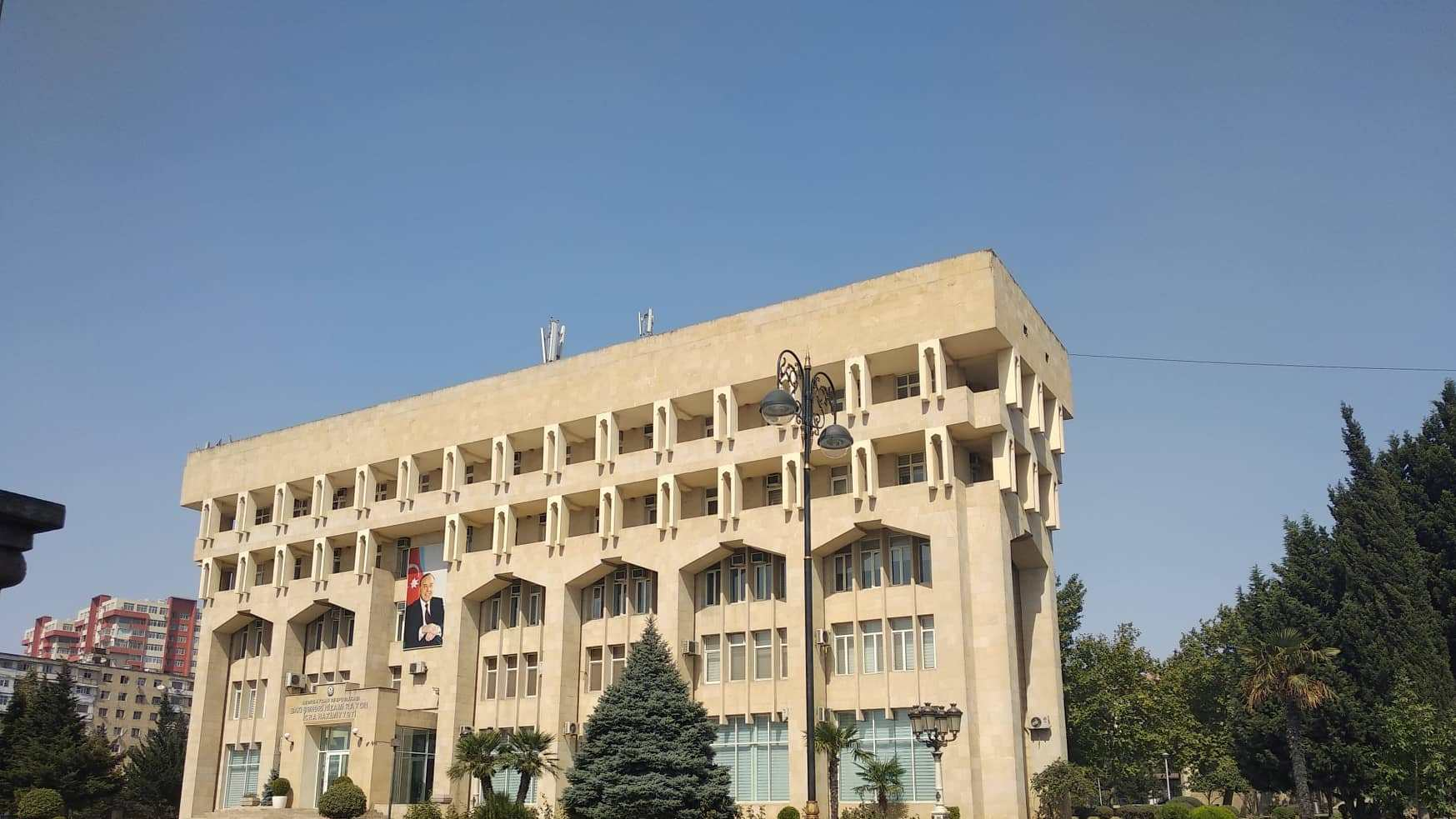
- Building of Nizami District Executive Authority.

- Location within Azerbaijan
- Coordinates: 40°23′N 49°50′E
- Country: Azerbaijan
- City: Baku

Government
  - Body: Nizami District Executive Power
  - Mayor: Jabrayilov Coshgun Adil-oglu

Area
  - Total: 10.4 km^{2} (4.0 sq mi)

Population
  - Total: 185,313
  - Density: 17,800/km^{2} (46,100/sq mi)
- Time zone: UTC+4 (AZT)
- Website: www.nizami-ih.gov.az

Nizami Rayon (Azerbaijani: Nizami Rayonu) is a municipal district of the city of Baku, the capital of Azerbaijan. Its population is 201,239, and it includes the municipality of Keşlə. Of these, 25,626 lives in Keşlə municipality. The raion's area is 19.6 km². It is positioned on the north-eastern corner of the capital city, near the Heydar Aliyev International Airport.

== Name ==
The district is named after poet Nizami Ganjavi. There is an urban type settlement called 8th kilometer at Nizami raion. The stadium "Bakcell Arena" is situated at 8th kilometer district of Nizami raion.
