= Mehman (lake) =

Lake in Azerbaijan

- Location within Azerbaijan
- Interactive map of Mehman
- Location: Aghjabadi District, Beylagan District, Azerbaijan
- Coordinates: 40°06′48″N 47°44′40″E
- Basin countries: Azerbaijan
- Surface area: 12 km^{2} (4.6 sq mi)
- Max. depth: 1.5 m^{2} (16 sq ft)
- Surface elevation: 7 metres (23 ft)

Mehman (Azerbaijani: Mehman) is a lake in Azerbaijan located in the northern part of the Mil plain on the territory of the Aghjabadi and Beylagan districts.

== Description ==
The lake is located two kilometers far from the right bank of the Kura river. The lake periodically dries up. It lies at a height of 7 meters below sea level. The surface of the basin area of the lake is 12 km^{2} or 15 km^{2}. Dimensions - 8 by 4 km, according to other sources 1.7 by 1.3 km. The maximum depth is 1.5 m, while on 85% of the lake area, the depth is 0.5 - 0.7 m.

== Fauna ==
During the drying up of Aggol in 1943, the strongest specimens of nutria that lived in the lake, settled in Mehman lake.

The lake is inhabited by 34 species of plankton. There are populations of pike, carp, bream, and pike perch.

In May–June 1954, the expedition of K. Gambarov observed a mixed nesting colony, with white-tailed lapwing rare for Azerbaijan. Although the expedition did not identify bird nests, observations suggested that the white-tailed lapwing is likely to nest here. In the colony, in addition to these birds, were also common terns, black terns, barnacle terns, black-headed gulls, prairie beetles, and stilt.
