= Agzybirchala =

Lake in Azerbaijan

- Davachi limany
- Ağzıbirçala (Azerbaijani)
- Location within Azerbaijan
- Interactive map of Agzybirchala
- Location: Shabran district
- Coordinates: 41.2869°N 49.0731°E
- Type: Lake
- Primary inflows: Shabran, Davachi and Takhtakorpu
- Primary outflows: Garadakhna river
- Basin countries: Azerbaijan
- Surface area: 13.8 km^{2} (5.3 sq mi)
- Water volume: 10 m^{3} (350 cu ft)
- Surface elevation: 28 metres (92 ft)

Agzybirchala (Azerbaijani: Ağzıbirçala) or Davachi limany (Azerbaijani: Dəvəçi limanı) is a swampy freshwater lake on the shores of the Caspian Sea located in the Samur-Davachi lowland on the territory of the Shabran district of Azerbaijan. In the past, the lake was an estuary and was of a great fishery importance. The area is 13.8 km^{2} (5.3 sq mi) and the volume is 10 m^{3} (350 cu ft).

The rivers Shabran, Davachi and Takhtakorpu flow into the lake Agzybirchala, where from it takes its beginning the 4 km (2.5 mi) Garadakhna river which flows out into the Caspian Sea.

Bird hunting and fishing is practiced here during the hunting season. In the 1930's, 500 - 600 centners of fish per year were caught in it.
