= Lake Boyukshor =

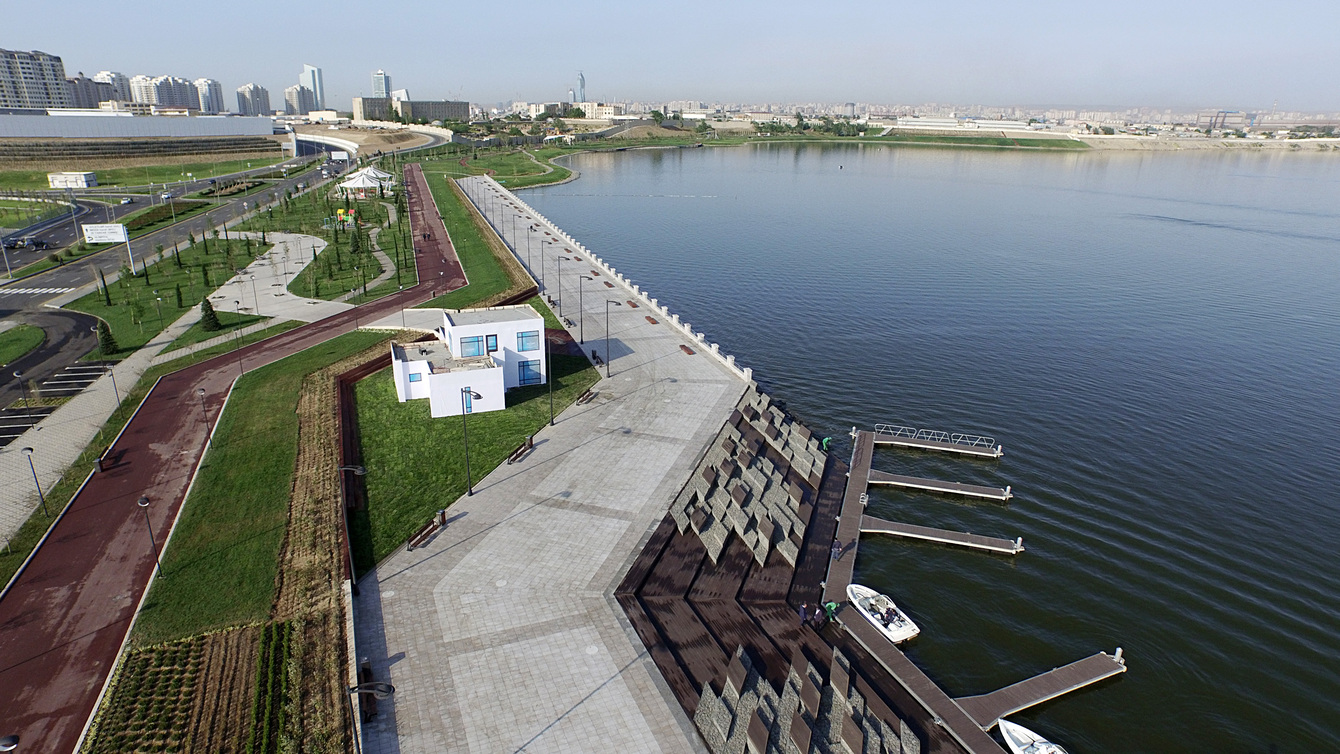

- Location within Azerbaijan
- Interactive map of Lake Boyukshor
- Location: Absheron Peninsula, Azerbaijan
- Coordinates: 40°27′02″N 49°53′15″E
- Lake type: Endorheic lake
- Basin countries: Azerbaijan
- Max. length: 10 km (6.2 mi)
- Max. width: 1.5–2.0 km (0.93–1.24 mi)
- Surface area: 16.2 km^{2} (6.3 sq mi)
- Average depth: 2.35 m (7.7 ft)
- Max. depth: 4.20 m (13.8 ft)
- Water volume: 45 million cubic metres (1.6×10^{9} cu ft)

Boyukshor (Azerbaijani: Böyük Şor gölü), also spelled separately Boyuk Shor (in translation refers to "Big Salty"), is the second-largest lake of Azerbaijan and the largest on Absheron Peninsula. It is located in the center of the Absheron peninsula, on the boundaries of Binagadi, Sabunchu and Narimanov raions of the city of Baku.

== Overview ==
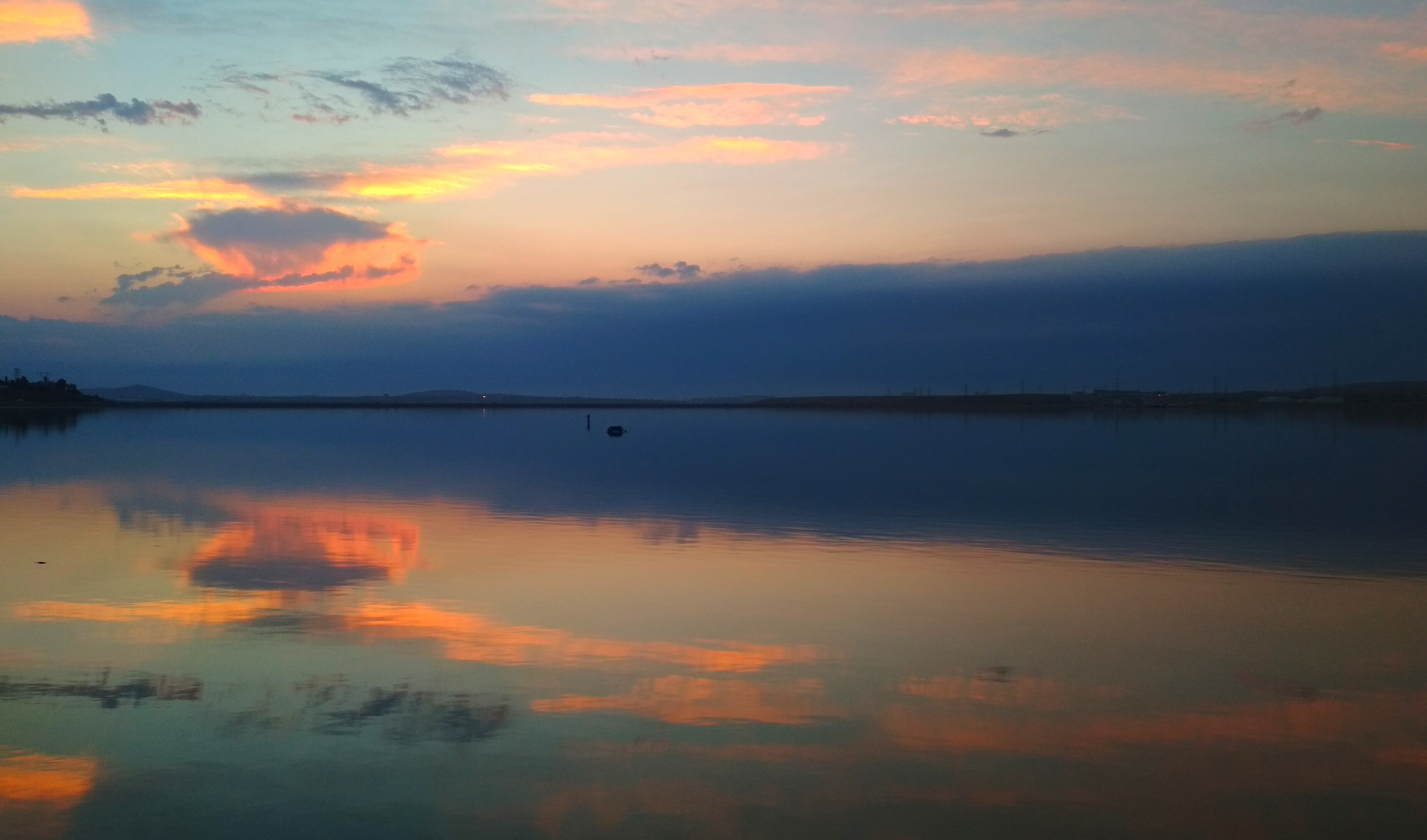
View of Boyukshor Lake

According to geological data, the average depth of the water in the lake is 3.40-3.95 meters; the maximum depth is 4.20 meters. The shoreline depth ranges from 0.50 to 1.70 meters. The lake is in oval shape and its length from the northwestern to southeastern bank is about 10 km whilst the maximum width is 1.5-2.0 km. The lake feeds from the underground waters and completely contained from any rivers. The lake surface is 1,300 hectares and the volume is 45 million cm^{3}.

=== Ecology ===
The ecological situation of the lake is in a bad state. It is polluted with waste from surrounding businesses. According to the Ministry of Ecology, about 18 thousand m^{3} of industrial and communal waste is disposed to the lake. One of the main sources of pollution is the oil waste waters from oil exploration and production boom of the 1930s. The first oil storage reservoir was built near the lake in 1866. In 2004, the ecological state of the lake was placed in extremely poor category. Additionally, the construction works which started with drying out of the lake caused more pollution for the residents of the area. The strong winds of Baku create dust from the sand transported to the lake location to dry the lake. Experts have also alleged that while dehydrating the lake, sediments spread by the wind will cause more ecological problems.

The good news is that cleanup has begun in 2015. The government of Azerbaijan has already completed work on the east side of Boyukshor lake. Plans are underway to clean at least eight more of the most heavily contaminated lakes and transform them into recreational sites.

== Construction of entertainment complex ==
In the 2000s, the Baku authorities prepared a plan for construction of a big entertainment complex on the place of the Boyuk Shor lake. The lake is planned to be dried out and a set of parks and buildings be constructed on its territory. The first stage of the project plans to consume 128 hectares of the territory, with 70% to be composed of soil and 30% of a yet to be created clean artificial lake. It will include an entertainment park, sports and resort facilities and gardens. Azerbaijan's Oil Museum, Azerbaijani Tea and Azerbaijani Wines museums are proposed to be built as well. A new mall on 4.5 hectares will be built too. The main entrance to the park will be from the Boyuk Shor Highway (known as the "airport highway") Close to the entrance, "Children's World" complex will be constructed. It will include a movie theater, a concert hall, a café, a zoo (14 ha), attractions park (10 ha). The center of the complex will have an artificial lake with small boats tours, a 300-meter-high (980 ft) waterfall. The complex will also include a 1,000-meter-long (3,300 ft) railroad for kids.
