= Zığ, Baku =

Zığ
- Municipality
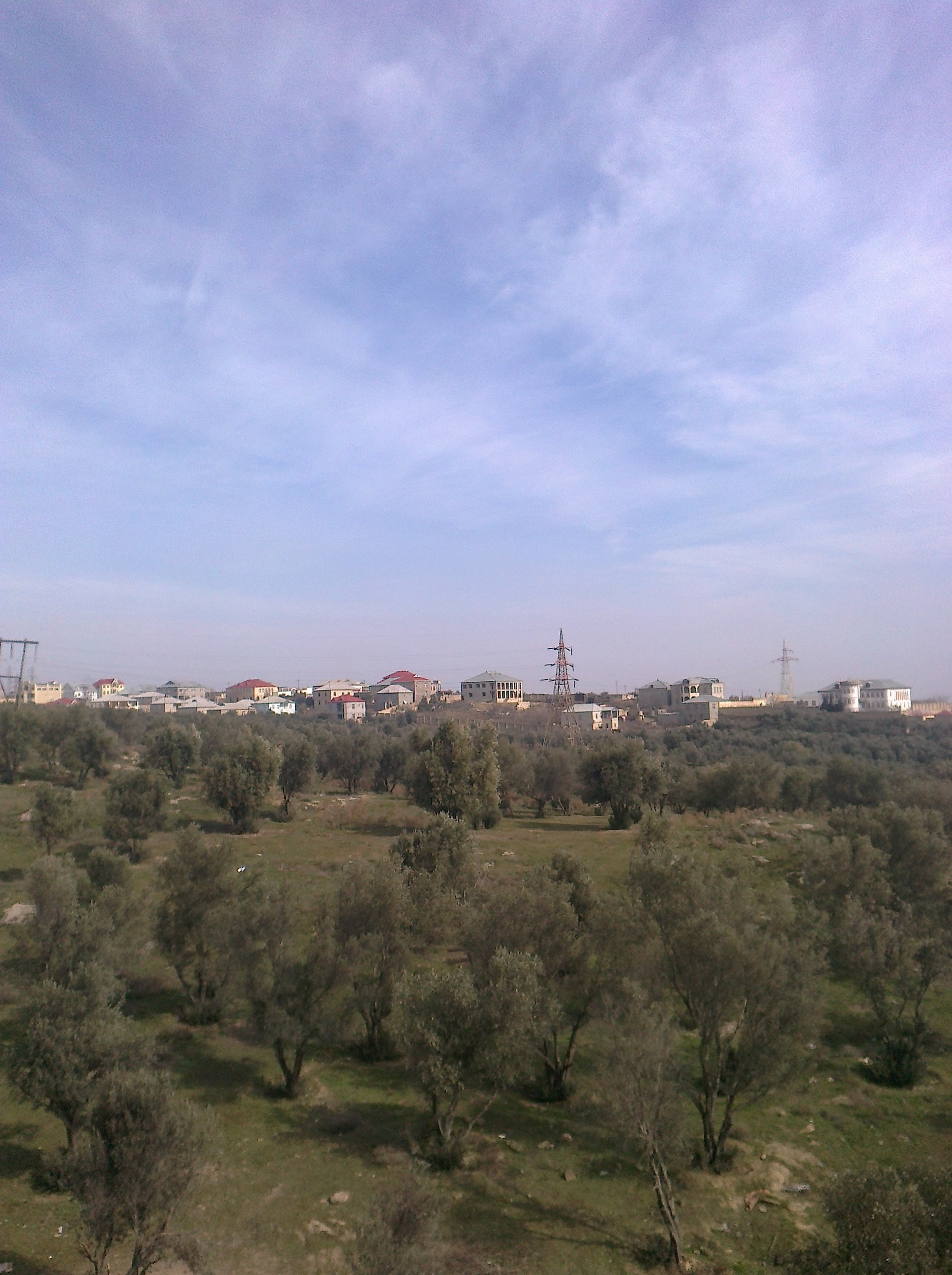
- Olive Garden in Zig

- Location within Azerbaijan
- Coordinates: 40°22′14″N 49°59′03″E
- Country: Azerbaijan
- City: Baku
- District: Suraxanı (Surakhani)

Population
  - Total: 15,755
- Time zone: UTC+4 (AZT)
  - Summer (DST): UTC+5 (AZT)

Zığ (also, Zykh) is a municipality in Baku, Azerbaijan. It has a population of 15,755. Zığ is a suburb in Baku Region, Azerbaijan and Zığ is situated nearby to the quarter Zeytunluq Yaşayış Sahəsi, as well as near Yeni Günəşli \ D massivi.

== Road ==
Zikh Baku Airport Highway.

== Metro ==
The Zikh Metro Station Q-19 in

Red line

is planned by Baku Metro in this area in the future.
