= Daşbulaq =

Daşbulaq or Dashboulagh or Dashbulak or Dashbulakh or Dashbulaq or Dashbolagh or Dash Bolagh or Dash Bulaq may refer to:

== Azerbaijan ==
- Dağ Daşbulaq, Azerbaijan
- Daşbulaq, Gadabay, Azerbaijan
- Daşbulaq, Kalbajar, Azerbaijan
- Daşbulaq, Khojali, Azerbaijan
- Daşbulaq, Shaki, Azerbaijan
- Daşbulaq, Shamkir, Azerbaijan
- Dəllər Daşbulaq, Azerbaijan

== Iran ==
=== Ardabil Province ===
- Dash Bolagh, Germi, a village in Germi County
- Dash Bolagh, Anguti, a village in Germi County
- Dash Bolagh, Meshgin Shahr, a village in Meshgin Shahr County
- Dash Bolagh Kandi, a village in Meshgin Shahr County
- Dash Bolagh, Nir, a village in Nir County

=== East Azerbaijan Province ===
- Dashbolagh, Ahar, a village in Ahar County
- Dashbolagh-e Moghar, a village in Ahar County
- Dash Bolagh-e Olya, a village in Charuymaq County
- Dash Bolagh-e Pain, a village in Charuymaq County
- Dash Bolagh, Hashtrud, a village in Hashtrud County
- Dash Bolagh, Malekan, a village in Malekan County
- Dash Bolagh, Maragheh, a village in Maragheh County
- Dash Bolagh, Meyaneh, a village in Meyaneh County

=== Kurdistan Province ===
- Dash Bolagh, Kurdistan, a village in Qorveh County

=== West Azerbaijan Province ===
- Dash Bolagh, West Azerbaijan, a village in Takab County

=== Zanjan Province ===
- Dash Bolagh, Zanjan, Iran
- Dash Bolagh, Abhar, Zanjan Province, Iran
- Dash Bolagh, Khodabandeh, Zanjan Province, Iran

== See also ==
- Bash Bolagh (disambiguation)
