= Zəyəm =

Zəyəm or Zagyam or Dzagam or Dzagem or Zeyam may refer to:

- Zəyəm Cırdaxan, Azerbaijan
- Zəyəm, Qakh, Azerbaijan
- Zəyəm, Shamkir, Azerbaijan
- Zəyəm, Zaqatala, Azerbaijan
