= Zagam =

Zagam may refer to:

- Zagan (demon), a demon
- Zagam (drug), a brand name for the medication sparfloxacin
- Zəyəm Cırdaxan, Azerbaijan
- Zəyəm, Qakh, Azerbaijan
- Zəyəm, Shamkir, Azerbaijan
- Zəyəm, Zaqatala, Azerbaijan
- Zagem, a former town in the Caucasus
