= Hüseynbəyli =

Hüseynbəyli or Guseynbeyli may refer to:

- Hüseynbəyli, Barda, Azerbaijan
- Hüseynbəyli, Fizuli, Azerbaijan
- Hüseynbəyli, Qazakh, Azerbaijan
- Zəyəm, Shamkir, Azerbaijan
