= Haji Molla Ahmad Nuruzade =

Azerbaijani leader (1881–1930)

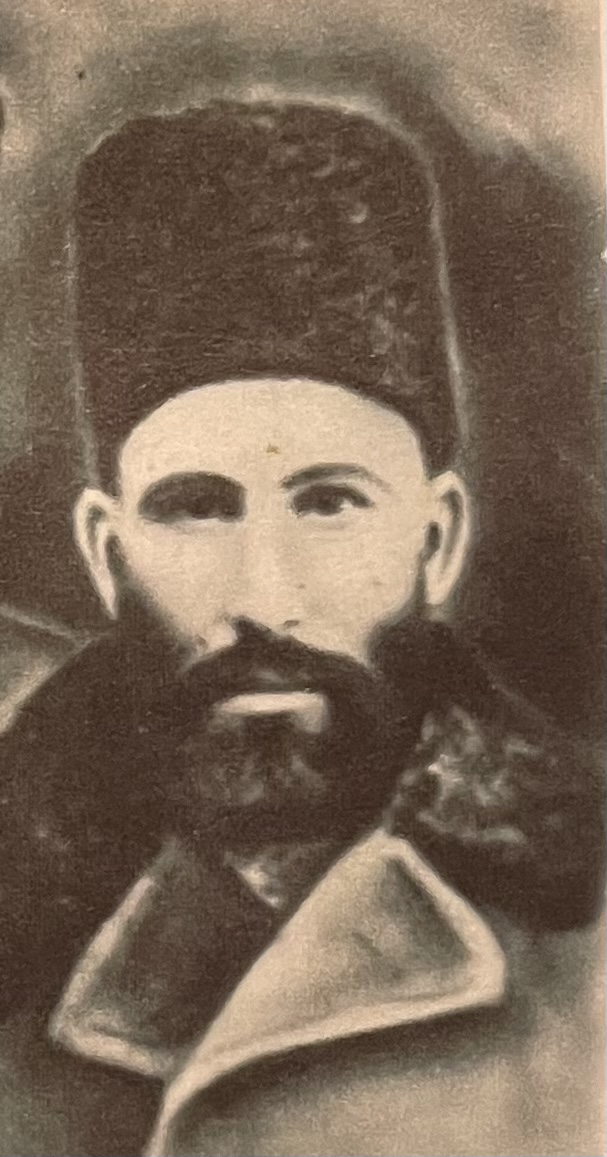
- Born: 1881; Duyarli, Elizavetpol uezd, Elizavetpol Governorate, Russian Empire
- Died: 1930 (aged 48–49); Duyarli, Shamkir, Azerbaijan SSR, Soviet Union
- Citizenship: Russian Empire; Azerbaijan Democratic Republic; Soviet Union
- Occupations: Politician and leader of the rebellion

Haji Molla Ahmad Nuruzade (Azerbaijani:Hacı Molla Əhməd Nuruzadə; b. 1881, Duyarli, Elizavetpol uezd, Elizavetpol Governorate, Russian Empire — d. 1930, Duyarli, Shamkir, Azerbaijan SSR, Soviet Union) — also known by the alias Haji Akhund. Haji Molla Ahmad served as a deputy in the parliament of the Azerbaijan Democratic Republic era and was a member of the Musavat Party. He actively resisted the Bolshevik occupation of Azerbaijan and in 1930 shot himself rather than be recaptured by his enemies.

== Life ==
Haji Ahmed Nuruzadeh was born in 1881 in the village of Duyarli in the family of Haji Piri. He was the fourth of 5 children in the family. Ahmad received his religious education in Najaf, one of the religious-educational centers of the Shia, and after completing his education, he returned to his village and was appointed akhund of the mosque. After the Azerbaijan Democratic Republic declared its independence in 1918, he became a member of the parliament and a representative of the Ahrar Party on the Ganja district. During the struggle with the Bolsheviks-Dashnaks, under the leadership of Haji Molla Ahmad Nuruzade, Yeg Mustafa and Karbalayi Ismayil, the residents of Duyarli tried to collect material and technical supplies for the Islamic Army of the Caucasus. Some of these people joined the Caucasian Islamic Army together with Molla Ahmed and participated in the battles for Baku. Until May 1920, Nuruzade stayed in the city of Ganja. After the start of the Ganja rebellion against the Bolshevik occupation, Nuruza joins the rebellion. When the rebellion was defeated, Nuruzadeh's supporters, Mashadi Hasan and Mashadi Ali, came to take him away in a carriage. Nuruzade's young wife Alaviya also joins them. While they were driving away from Ganja in a carriage, they were hit by artillery fire and the carriage drivers were seriously injured. The wounded died two days after reaching Diyarli.

Molla Ahmed again becomes the akhund of the village. In September 1927, the NKVD sent people from the village of Zayam to detain him, after which he became a Qaçaq (A Qaçaq is a person who flees to the mountains and fights against the central government). He gathered supporters around him and started an armed struggle against the Soviet authorities to restore the Azerbaijan Democratic Republic. Bapban Mail, another qaçaq from the village of Duyarli, started to support him with his group. Haji Akhund went to the mountains together with 200 fugitives, founded a printing house there and started publishing "Azadlig" (Freedom) newspaper. In his articles, he urged the people to fight against the Soviet government and revive the national republic. After the death of Bapban Mail, Nuruzade's troops began to attack the Soviet infrastructure more actively. After starting the partisan life, his wife Alaviya returned to Ganja. After that, Nuruzade married a woman named Govhar, and a son was born from this marriage.

From the beginning of 1930, the Bolsheviks held daily meetings at the post office, the social center of the village of Duyarli. At the meetings, they carried out propaganda against Haji Akhund and his supporters. Nuruzadeh and his troops were members of the "Allahlılar" organization, ideologically close to the "Ittihad" party. In the summer, Nuruzade held a meeting and decided that the acts of robbery and damage to the local population should be stopped. It was also decided to establish relations with Karabakh partisans. In July, Nuruzade, Sultanov brothers and others gathered around Gadabey left for Dastafur region. Their total number was 60–80 people. The group's goal was to join Pirverdi's group in Dastafur region. In September, 13 people from his group were in the Duyarli region and were armed with Turkish rifles and revolvers. In recent times, internal conflicts between partisan groups and gangs have also appeared. Detachments were sent from both Baku and Ganja to eliminate Nuruzade's group.

The commander of the 24th regiment was appointed as the commander of this army. On the night of November 17, Nuruzade's group started active sabotage activities. They carried out three main operations in the areas near the location of the Soviet army units. At 22:00, Nuruzade's group cut the telegraph line between Zayam and Dulyar stations. In addition, they set fire to the Baku-Batumi kerosene pipeline and burned the 4-meter-long railway bridge. At the same time, an attempt was made to attack the 5-kilometer kerosene line from Zayam station. At 23:00, a 2-meter railway bridge near Dallar station was set on fire, the kerosene line was first set on fire, and then burned. Also, at the same time, the groups there set fire to a 10-meter railway bridge, thereby disrupting rail connectivity for some time. By the order of Joseph Stalin, the village of Duyarli was considered a "nest of bandits" and was completely destroyed within three days. On the night of November 20–21, the operation began and Duyarli was captured without a fight. As they moved north through the village, the Chekists spotted a partisan checkpoint. As a result, 25 cavalry partisans gathered at the place called Chugunda immediately began to retreat towards Kur. The second part of the partisans changed their direction after seeing that the security forces were going in the direction of Chugunda and headed towards Lower Ayyublu. After the capture of Duyarli, a group of security forces organized a meeting with the village community. In the meeting it was demanded the handover of all weapons, the surrender of bandit supporters and partisans. A commission was assembled to collect the weapons and a troika was created to surrender the partisans hiding in the neighboring areas. A collective farm – kolkhoz was organized in Duyarli, and the territory of Nuruzade was also included in it. Most of the Gulags disappeared from the village. On November 25, Nuruzadeh and his group of about 30 people tried to burn the bridge located in the village of Gushchu Ayrim. On November 27, they moved to the left bank of the Kur – to the territory of Jeyranchol. The total number of partisans who came here reached about 300 people. At the beginning of December, South Caucasus GPU reported that battles against rebels took place in Ganja district. In the report, the number of rebels is indicated as a thousand people:

The bandit movement is led by Mollah Haji Akhund, a former member of the Musavat parliament and a former Ittihadist. The main task of the bandit gangs under his leadership is to start a general rebellion. For this purpose, Haji Akhund started a large-scale propaganda. There are constant rumors about the "imminent collapse of Soviet power, the arrival of the British, Turkish armies, etc." The peasants are called to fight against the collective farms, they are called to fight "against the Russian invaders, to get rid of religion and poverty" and so on. Similar announcements were distributed in Gadabay. To spread the rumors about the arrival of the Turkish army, one of the bandits (on the orders of Haji Akhund) went around the surrounding villages dressed as a Turkish officer, and the bandits here called him "Pasha". At the same time, thug propagandists assured the villagers that "right-wing circles are supporting Hajl Akhund".

As a result of this preparation, more than 1,000 people gathered around Nuruzade, and as a result, he influenced a large number of villages in Shamkhor, Gasim-Ismailovsky districts. Qulaks in these regions played an important role in the material and technical provision of this movement and in providing it with information. In one of the battles, Nuruzade was seriously injured and lost one of his legs. He was forced to spend days and nights in the shepherd's hut belonging to the Shimanli tribe. After learning about this, the informants of the Soviet authorities informed the relevant authorities about it. The area of the hut where Nuruzade was staying was surrounded by security personnel. Nuruzade asks the shepherd to tell the soldiers that he is dead. After the shepherd did this, Nuruzade, who killed five of the soldiers who came to check it, immediately tried to get on his horse and run away. Nuruzade, who fought with the Bolsheviks on horseback, committed suicide by shooting himself with the last bullet. After his death, the Red Army captured some of Haji Akhund's troops, including former police officers, members of the Communist Party, and former rural party officials who were dissatisfied with the repressive policies of the Bolsheviks. Some of his supporters left the scene of the shooting, including his nephew Hamid, Seyyed Nizam, his right-hand man Tat Fattah and Kor Alibey. They stopped for the night in the village of Irmaşli. One of the shepherds who saw them reported this to the NKVD. Although the Qaçaqs were forced to flee to the village of Garataj, they could not escape and were killed there. Another 20 people from Nuruzade's group were captured and taken to Baku and killed in gas chambers. Another 12 people were shot near the village post office on the instructions of Jafarov, a member of the NKVD. Nuruzade's brother was among them. Their bodies were buried in the mass grave in Ganli Gova settlement near Saritepe village. Nuruzade's body was burned and thrown into a well near Shamkir station. After the execution ceremony, the wives and children of the partisans were gathered in the village square. 6 children were vaccinated from those gathered and died a week later. The dead included Nuruzadeh's son, his brother Yekya Muhammad's son and grandson, and the sons of guerrillas named Hasan, Husayn and Alagan.
