= Tatarlı =

Tatarlı or Tatarly may refer to:

- Tatarlı, Goranboy, Azerbaijan
- Tatarlı, Shamkir, Azerbaijan
