= Dashbulag =

Dashbulag may refer to:

- Dambulaq, Azerbaijan
- Daşbulaq (disambiguation), Azerbaijan
