= Church of the Saviour, Baku =

Lutheran church in Baku, Azerbaijan

Church of the Saviour
- Azerbaijani: Xilaskar kilsəsi; German: Erlöserkirche
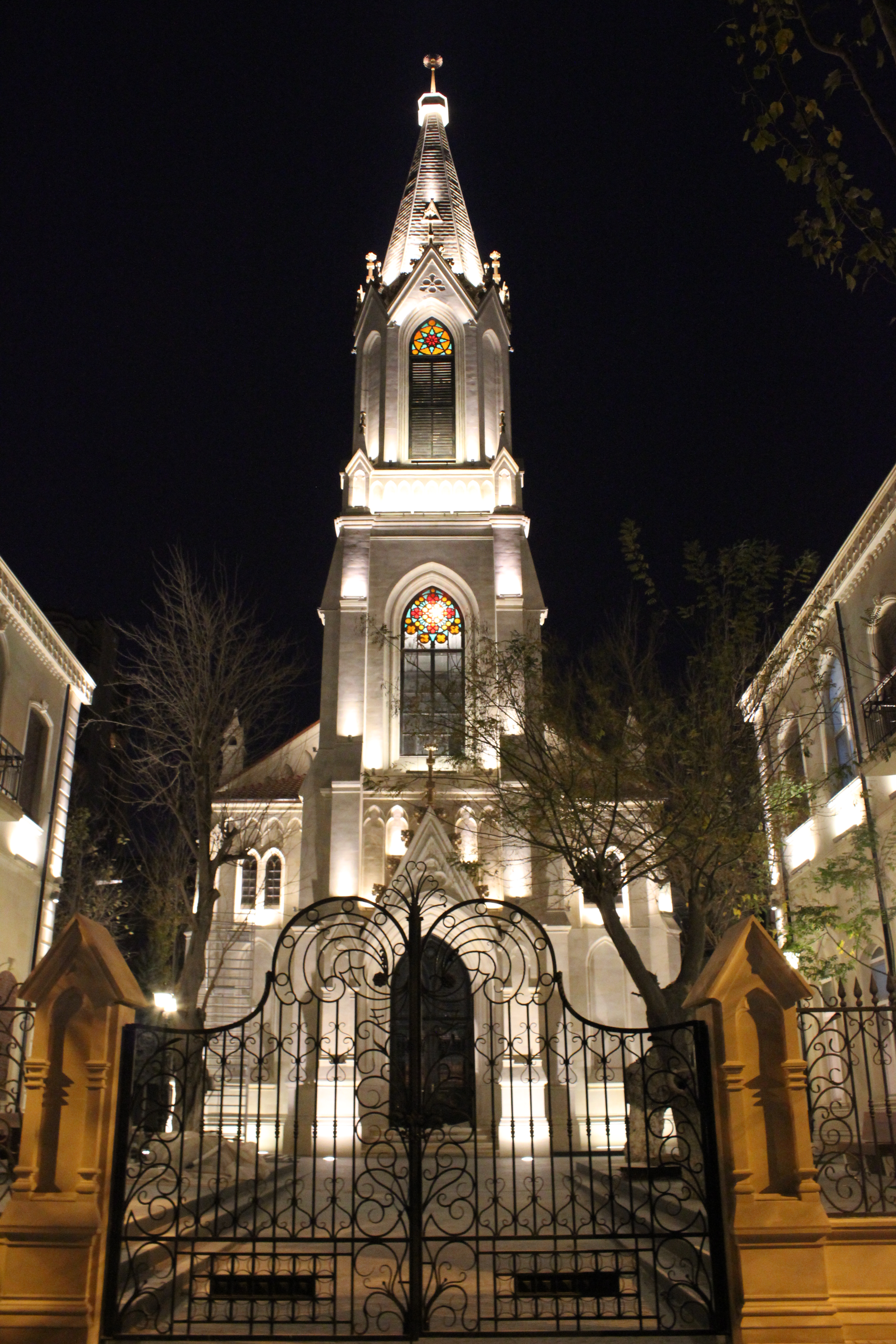
- Erlöserkirche
- Church of the Saviour
- 40°22′37″N 49°50′52″E
- Address: 28th May Street, 17, Nasimi town, Baku
- Country: Azerbaijan
- Denomination: Lutheranism

History
- Status: Parish church

Architecture
- Functional status: Active
- Architect: Adolf Eichler
- Architectural type: Church
- Style: Gothic Revival
- Groundbreaking: 1896
- Completed: 1899

The Church of the Saviour (Azerbaijani: Xilaskar kilsəsi; German: Erlöserkirche, also known as the kirkha, from the German word "Kirche" (church)) is a Lutheran church located at 28 May Street (formerly Telefonnaya Street) in Baku, Azerbaijan. Built between 1896 and 1899, it was designed in the Gothic Revival style by architect Adolf Eichler.

The church's plan features an elongated rectangular hall with a deep apse. A prominently profiled Neo-Gothic arch stands out against the plain wall background. The apse, together with the vaulted ceiling and arched side windows, forms the central axis of the interior space. The single-tower vertical composition of the church is situated in the depths of the courtyard. The building is highly expressive, with well-proportioned dimensions, clear divisions of its structural elements, and restrained use of Neo-Gothic decorative elements to create volumetric plasticity. The central portal is accentuated by austere, slightly protruding pilasters and is completed with a decorative, dynamic pediment.

== History ==
=== Evangelical-Lutheran Community ===
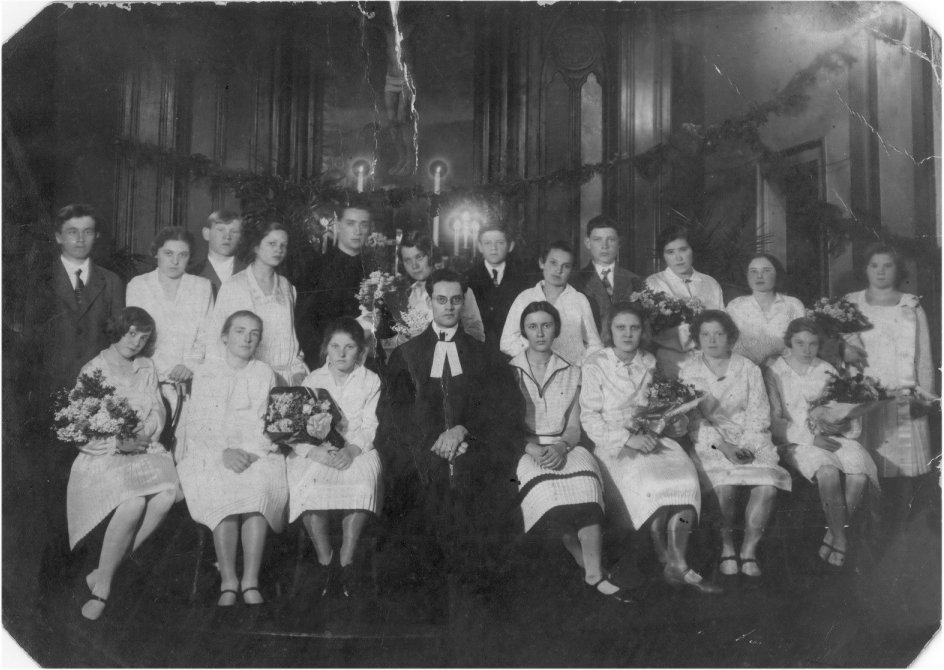
Confirmation at the Church of the Holy Savior, 1931

Lutheranism in the South Caucasus began spreading from the 1820s, following the establishment of German colonies in what is now the territory of Azerbaijan, such as Helenendorf and Annenfeld. During that period, the colonists were subordinate to the Evangelical Lutheran Supreme Consistory. In 1810, the Central Administration for Foreign Faiths (Главное управление иностранных исповеданий) was established, and from 1817, it became part of the Ministry of Religious Affairs of the Russian Empire. Until its dissolution in 1937, the Evangelical Lutheran Society of Azerbaijan was part of the United South Caucasus Evangelical Lutheran Society.

In 1864, individuals such as Eichler, the De Burr brothers, Otto Lend, and others migrated from Moscow to Baku. The Evangelical Lutheran Community established in Baku in 1870 was also organized by German Lutherans.In 1873, alongside Robert Nobel, Swedish Lutherans also settled in Baku. By 1877, there were 3,430 Germans living in the Baku Governorate.

=== Location selection ===
In 1877, Valerian Pozen, the Governor of Baku and a Major General, granted Lutherans permission to elect representatives and church council members, as well as to build a church (kirche) and a primary school. The council included engineer Tol, engineer Ferdinand Lemkul, pharmacist Karl Eichler, mechanical factory owner Otto Lend, Wilhelm Sorge (father of the intelligence officer Richard Sorge), Gottlieb Zinne, and Swiss national Sungreen. On May 2, 1878, members of the Baku Evangelical Lutheran Council, including Lemkul, Meyer, Eichler, Lentz, Zinne, and others, submitted a petition to the City Administration requesting land for constructing a house of worship and a primary school. They requested a plot on the former Nikolayevskaya Street (now Istiglaliyyat Street), where the current Building of Baku City Executive Power is located.

In February 1879, the Lutheran Church Council submitted another request to the City Administration, asking for land at the initially proposed location. If that was not possible, they requested a plot on the eastern side of the Tatar Cemetery, opposite the prison grounds (currently the site of the "Monolit" building). Although burials in that cemetery had been prohibited since 1859, people continued to visit graves there. According to Baku’s 1878 master plan, the area along the fortress walls was designated for artisan workshops, while the square opposite the prison was intended for commercial purposes. As a result, the City Administration suggested that the Church Council select another location.

On June 28, 1879, F. Lehmkuhl, along with Church Council members K. Eichler and O. Lenz, again petitioned the City Administration, requesting another plot of land not far from the city center. On April 25, 1885, Karl Ludwig Limmerman, the chairman of the Baku Evangelical Lutheran Community Church Council, submitted another request. He stated that the 6,002 sazhen plot allocated on Karantinnaya Street (now Həzi Aslanov Street) was too small for constructing a house of worship and a school. Therefore, he requested a vacant plot on Telefonnaya Street (now 28 May Street). On November 30, 1885, the Baku City Duma approved the allocation of a vacant plot near Masumov’s factory and Vermishev’s mill on Telefonnaya Street for the construction of a church and school. On January 2, 1886, a plot measuring 14,002 sazhen was surveyed and handed over to the Lutheran community. Thus, the Evangelical Lutheran Society took 14 years to secure land in Baku.

=== Construction ===
In 1886, with the involvement of the Eichler family, a school building was constructed on Suraxanskiy Street (now Dilara Aliyeva Street), which also temporarily served as a place of worship. That same year, architect Johann Edel prepared a plan for the construction of a house of worship. However, on February 13, 1894, a general assembly decided to build a dedicated church instead. The task of designing the church was entrusted to 24-year-old architect Adolf Eichler, the nephew of Karl Eichler. On March 6, 1894, Adolf Eichler presented the church design to the community assembly for approval. On March 14, 1896, the Russian Empire’s Ministry of Internal Affairs approved the project and granted permission for construction.

On March 21, 1896, a Sunday, the ceremonial laying of the church’s foundation took place. The event was attended by Baku Governor Pavel Lileyev and Mayor Iretsky, as well as Emmanuel Nobel, who traveled to Baku for the occasion. During the ceremony, it was announced that the church would be named the Church of the Savior. The church was built with donations from believers, including the Nobel brothers, and the total construction cost amounted to 70,000 rubles.

=== Blessing ===
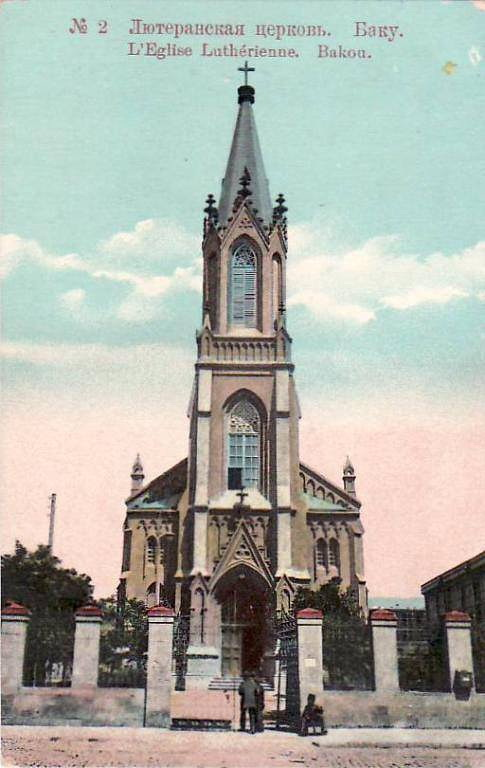
The Church of the Savior on a postcard from the Russian Empire

On June 24, 1898, in a ceremony attended by a large crowd, a gold-plated cross weighing 13 poods (approximately 213 kilograms) was raised onto the church tower. The cost of the cross, amounting to 15,000 rubles, was covered by Bruno de Burr, the brother of Lutheran community chairman Lev de Burr. In 1899, bells and an organ were installed in the church. The first organ music was heard in the church on February 4, 1899. On March 14, 1899, the consecration ceremony of the German-Swedish Parish’s Church of the Savior was held. More than a thousand people attended the event, including Governor Vladimir Rogge.

On April 23, 1900, the first religious organ concert was held in the church, featuring works by J.S. Bach. These concerts became a tradition and continued until 1928.

=== During the USSR ===
In 1934, a decision was made to demolish the Church of the Savior. However, the Evangelical Lutheran community of Azerbaijan continued its activities until 1937. The last pastor, Paul Hamberg, left the church in 1934, but the Church Council continued to fight for the preservation of the church and the rights of its visitors. In 1936, Rudolf Wagner, a council member, initiated an effort funded by donations from churchgoers. Amaliya Andreyevna Karpenko was sent to Moscow with a special letter addressed to the Soviet government and directly to Stalin. The letter requested permission to preserve the German church in Baku and allow worshippers to continue praying for Stalin's well-being for the remainder of their lives. Unlike other major religious sites in Baku—such as the Church of the Immaculate Conception, Alexander Nevsky Cathedral, the Church of St. Bartholomew, and the Bibi-Heybat Mosque—the Church of the Savior was not destroyed. However, on November 1, 1937, tragedy struck. Community activists, including Paul Leopoldovich Hamberg, Rudolf Rudolfovich Wagner, Christian Kasparovich Dittscheul, John Christianovich Winter, Ida Bernhardovna Temnikova, Maria Augustovna Friedrichson, Amaliya Andreyevna Karpenko, and Dietrich Cornelievich Tissen, were executed by gunfire.

However, the demolition of the church was ultimately prevented. In 1934, after the sudden death of Sergey Kirov, the Soviet government urgently decided to erect a statue in his honor in Baku. The task of creating the statue was assigned to sculptor Pinchos Sabsay. Sabsay requested a large space with a high ceiling to continue working on the statue and asked for the church building to be allocated as his workshop. As a result, the demolition of the church was postponed, and the building was repurposed as Sabsay’s workshop. In the following years, by a decision of the Cabinet of Ministers, the building was renamed the Chamber and Organ Music Hall and was placed under the administration of the Azerbaijan State Philharmonic Society.

=== In modern times ===
On March 15, 2010, the President of Azerbaijan Ilham Aliyev signed a decree “Considering the importance of the Chamber and Organ Music Hall of the Azerbaijan State Philharmonic as a historical and architectural monument and a cultural center,” and the President of the Republic of Azerbaijan allocated 1 million manat from the Reserve Fund of the President of the Republic of Azerbaijan for the restoration work. After one year of restoration, the opening ceremony of the restored church building took place on December 30, 2010, with the participation of the President of Azerbaijan and the First Lady. The restoration work, carried out by Azerbaijani specialists, preserved the building's original style and ancient historical architecture. Special attention was given to the acoustics of the building, a fine example of traditional German Gothic architecture. Furthermore, a ventilation system was installed, and foreign experts restored the organ.

In 2016, Vera Viktorovna Nesterev, the head of the Evangelical Lutheran Church in Baku, reported that the church was charging a 20 AZN fee for Sunday services, but the congregation was unable to pay this amount consistently. In response, the State Committee for Work with Religious Associations stated that, like all religious communities, the Lutheran congregation also receives state funding from the national budget.

== Architectural features ==
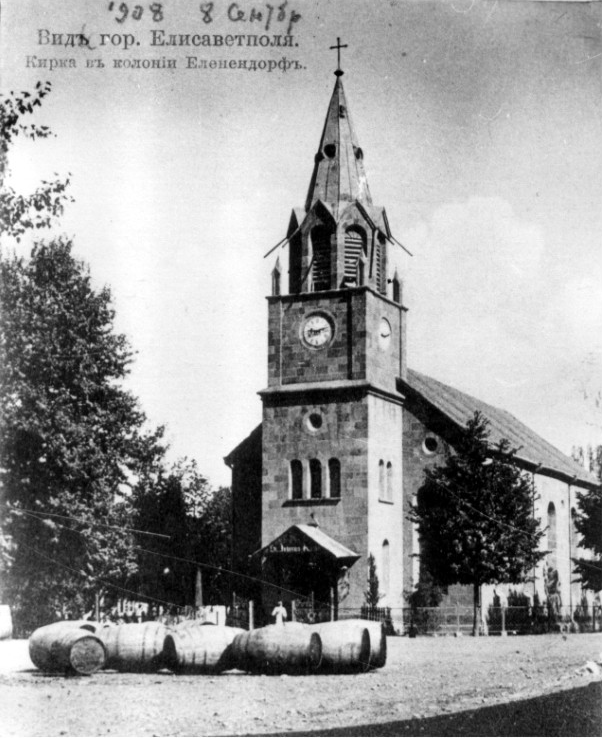
St. John's Church (Goygol) in Goygol city

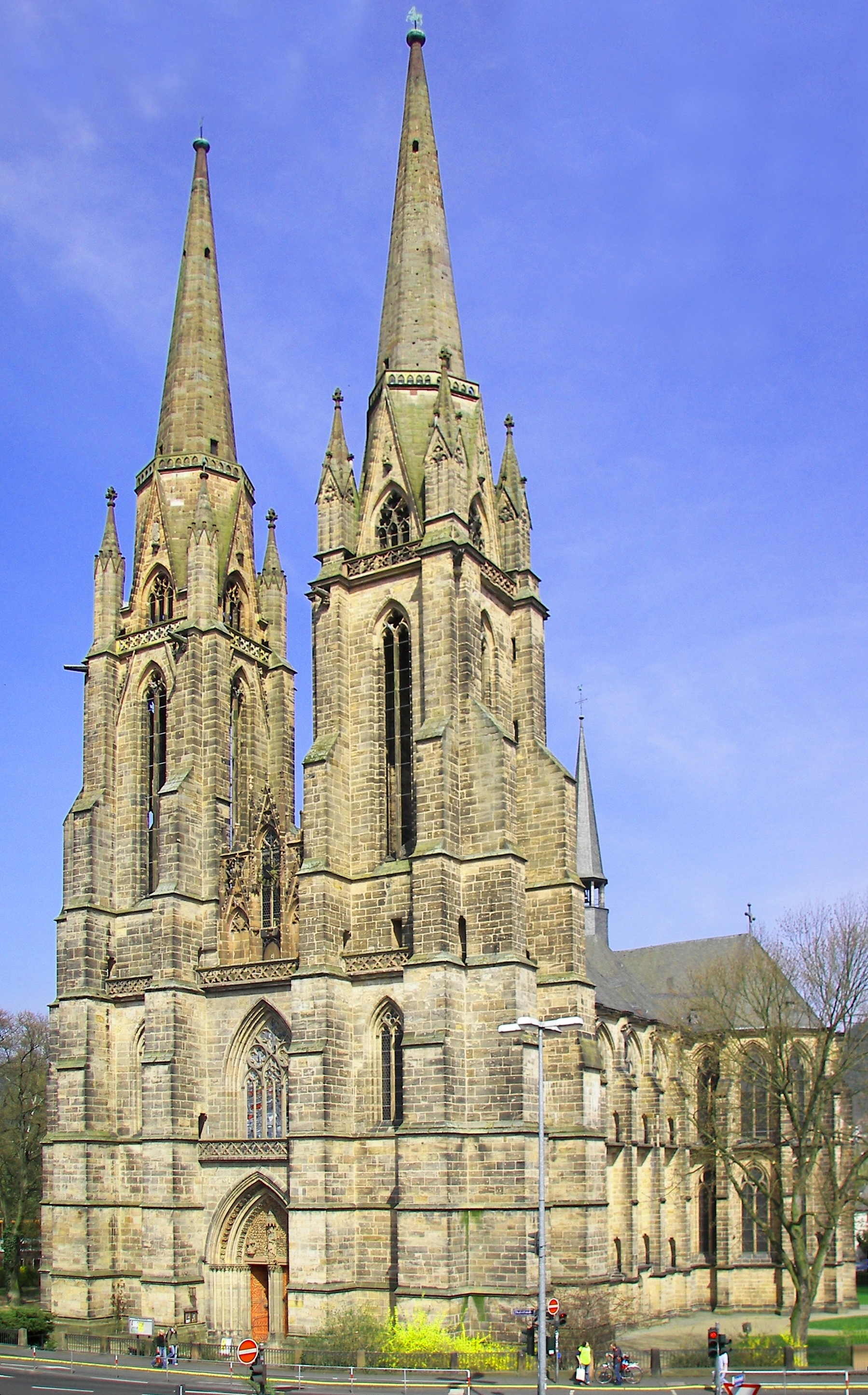
St. Elizabeth's Church (Marburg)

The main clients of the project, the German-born residents of Baku, presented a request to architect A. Eyxler to design the church in a manner that would resemble the church in the Yelenendorf (now Göygöl) colony. Although the architect of the Yelenendorf church is unknown, its design somewhat recalls the religious structures in the provinces of medieval Germany.

However, for Baku, which had become one of the major industrial centers of the Caucasus and the Russian Empire at the turn of the 19th and 20th centuries, the church in Yelenendorf could not serve as an architectural model. Adolf Eyxler, a talented architect and artist, had a refined architectural style. His deep erudition and high professionalism allowed him to design the church in the best traditions of German Gothic. The high quality of the construction and decoration of the church made it stand out, even when integrated into a unified complex with auxiliary buildings, distinguishing it from the surrounding ordinary structures.

=== Location ===
Architectural researcher Shamil Fatullayev-Fiqarov notes that the church's location, set significantly behind the red line of 28 May Street (formerly Telefonnaya), can be considered fortunate. This strategic placement allowed the building's volumetric-spatial structure to fully unfold. According to the researcher, "the chosen position is very convenient for observing the building's brilliant beauty."

Unlike other public and civic buildings located along the narrow streets of Baku with limited architectural panoramas, the church stands out as the only religious structure where the scale and spatial atmosphere are distinctly felt. The surrounding buildings do not create any discomfort for the church, and it acts as a compositional dominant in its architectural expression.

=== İnterior ===
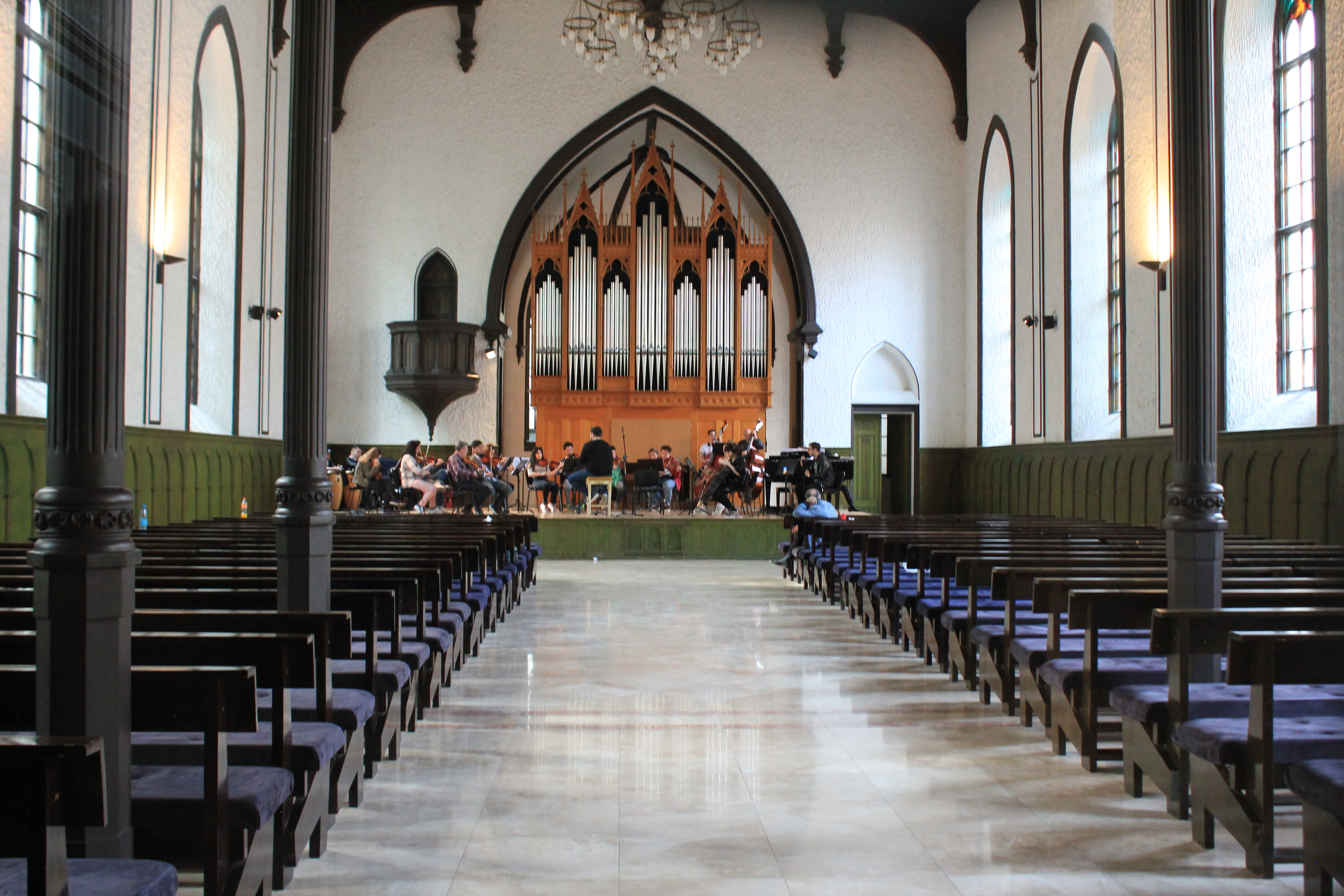
Church interior

The church's plan features an elongated rectangular hall with a deep apse. Noteworthy is the bold, profiled Gothic arch against the clean background of the walls. The apse's dome, along with the arched window placements on the sides, defines the central axis of the interior space. The interior design is strict and simple, with light coming from the traditional Neo-Gothic-style windows on the sides. The ceiling, crafted in the best traditions of wooden architecture, is characteristic of the German Gothic style.

The coffered ceiling sits gracefully atop the clean walls, accompanied by beautiful cornices. The architectural elements, contrasted with the large flat surfaces of the walls, form an interesting compositional solution.

Above the main entrance of the worship hall, opposite the apse, is a balcony for organ music on the second floor. Despite its simple design, the hall achieves high merit due to the proportional division of its architectural masses, the tasteful application of decorative elements, and the high quality of the work carried out in the interior.

=== Exterior ===
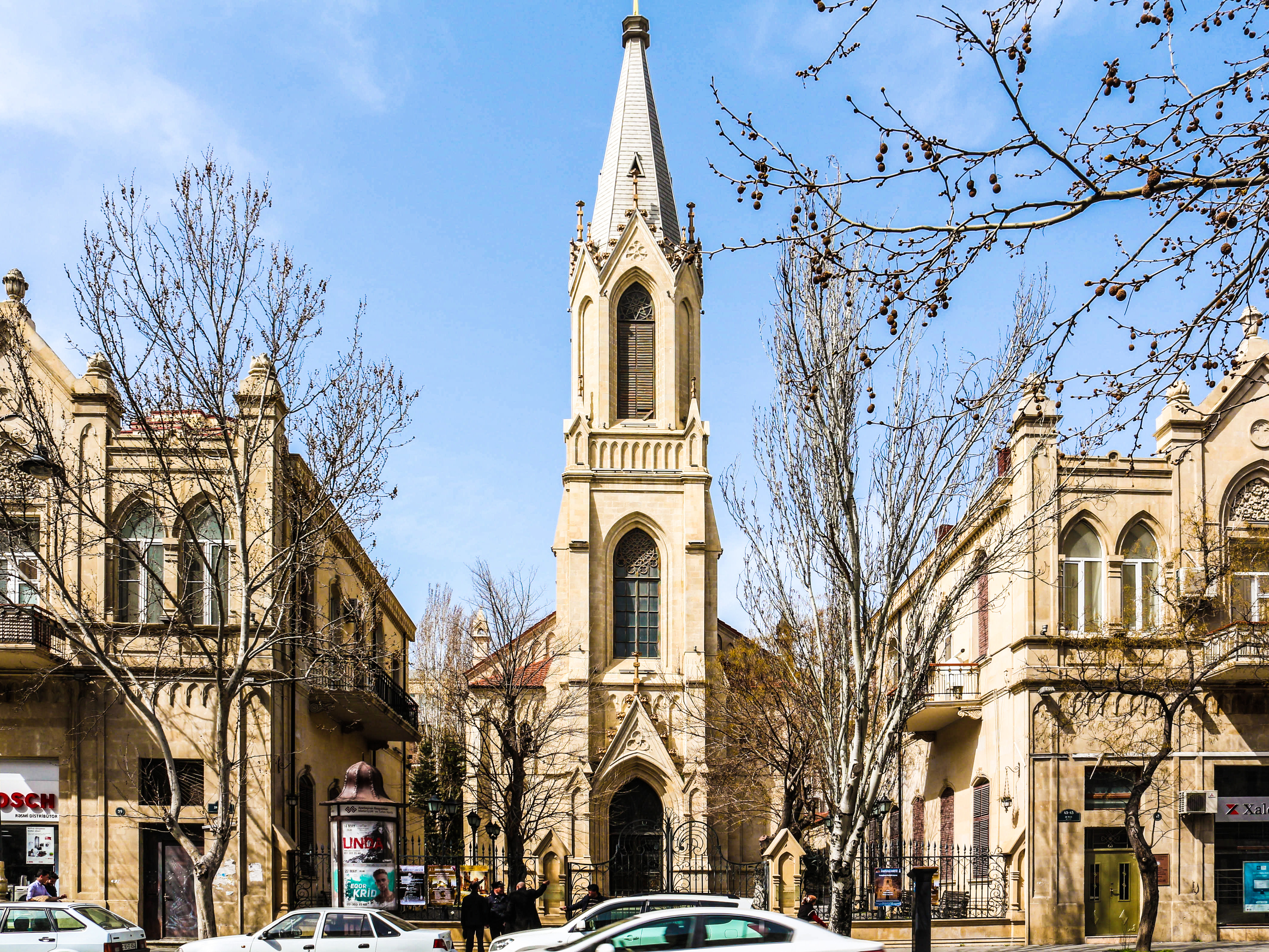
The church in 2016

The church features a one-towered vertical composition that is situated deep within the courtyard. The harmonious proportions, the smooth division of the main construction parts, and the avoidance of excessive Gothic decorative elements result in a highly expressive volumetric form. The solid, slightly protruding pilasters draw attention to the central portal, which is completed with a dynamic decorative pediment. The slopes of the pediment are adorned with crabs and cross-shaped flowers.

Shamil Fatullayev notes that compared to the Saint Elizabeth Church in Marburg, the tasks faced by Adolf Eyxler in terms of both the building’s scale and its volumetric-spatial composition were simpler. However, the architect was likely inspired by the Marburg structure to some degree.

The portal's bold, profiled pointed arch draws attention to the rose motif above the door through soft profiles, creating an atmosphere of joy and tranquility. The forms of Gothic architecture, characterized by pointed arches, find their place in a dynamic sequence, accentuated by the octagonal tower. This interesting technique, a hallmark of German Gothic, is repeated in the pediments, crabs, and cross-shaped flowers. The architecture displays a dynamic scale that reflects the creativity of Baku craftsmen, the high-quality stone from the Absheron quarries, and the talent of architect A. Eyxler, making this church a pinnacle of Gothic Revival architecture in Baku.

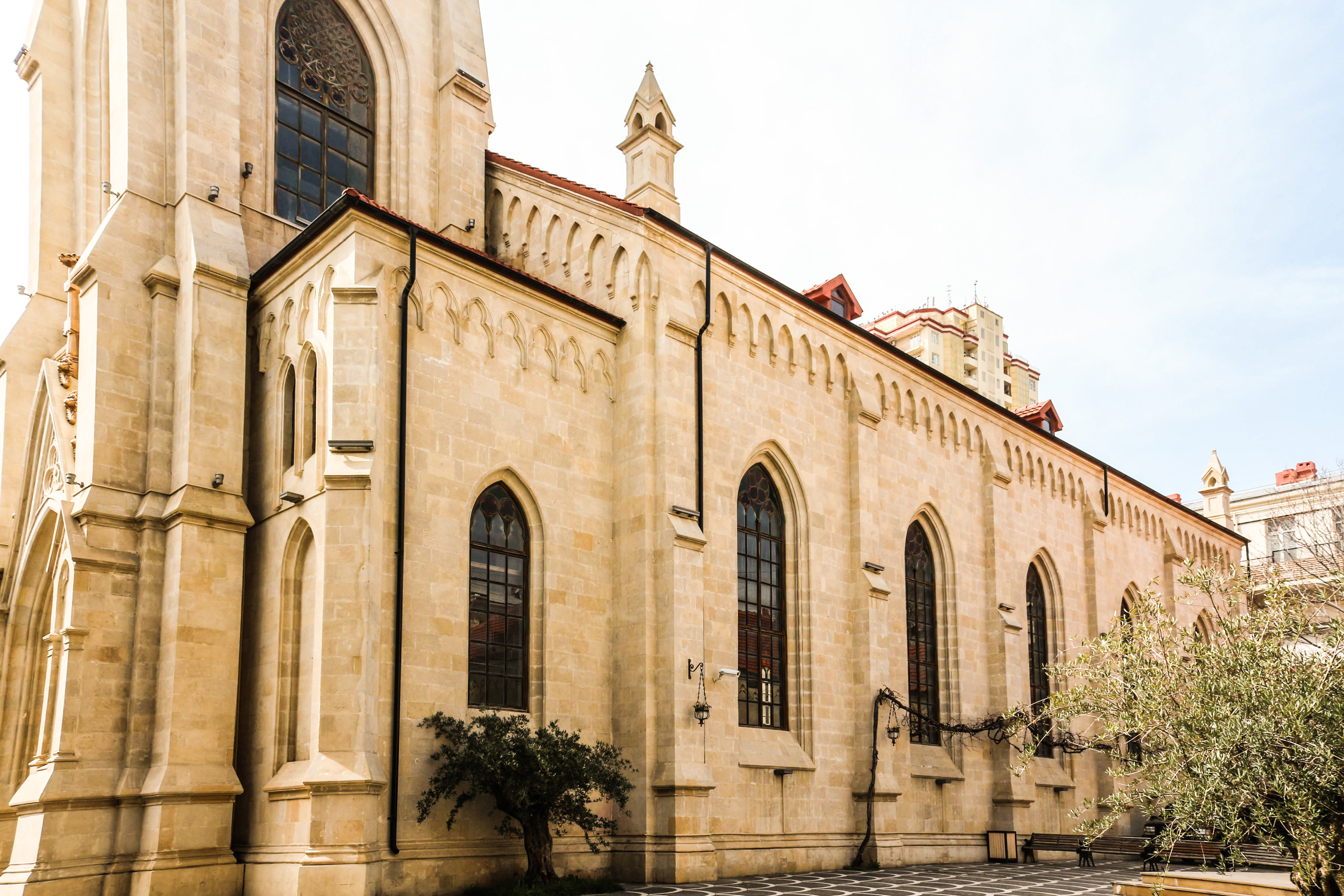

The vertical structure of the church has a subtle yet undeniable impact. It maintains its dominant position, even when harmoniously integrated with the adjacent masses. The architectural elements that close off the arched spaces are prominently expressed.

The overall volume and spatial composition of the church allowed architect Adolf Eyxler to bring a fresh perspective to Gothic Revival architecture. His design was shaped within an Eastern context, where he created a Neo-Gothic structural form that emerged from a different constructive and framework system. This approach not only maintained the essence of Gothic Revival architecture but also adapted it to the local environment and the unique conditions of the region.

== See also ==
- Caucasus Germans
- Christianity in Azerbaijan
- Germans in Azerbaijan

== Sources ==
- Fətullayev-Fiqarov, Şamil (2013). Bakının memarlıq ensiklopediyası [Architectural encyclopedia of Baku] (in Azerbaijani). Baku: Şərq-Qərb, Azərbaycan Respubliksı Memarlar İttifaqı.
- Fətullayev-Fiqarov, Şamil (2013). Bakı memarları - XIX əsrin sonu XX əsrin əvvəllərində [Baku architects - late 19th century, early 20th century] (in Azerbaijani). Baku: Şərq-Qərb, Azərbaycan Respubliksı Memarlar İttifaqı.
- Gumbatova, Tamara Filippovna (2008). Баку и немцы [Baku and the Germans]. Baku.
- Verdiyeva, Hadjar (2009). Немцы в Северном Азербайджане [Germans in Northern Azerbaijan] (PDF). Baku: Elm. Archived from the original (PDF) on March 28, 2018.
- Zeynalova, Sudaba (2008). Немцы на Кавказе [Germans in the Caucasus] (PDF). Baku: Mütərcim. ISBN 978-9952-28-010-4. Archived from the original (PDF) on December 25, 2019.
