= Bash Bolagh =

Bash Bolagh (Persian: باش بلاغ), also rendered as Bash-Bulag, may refer to:

- Bash Bolagh, East Azerbaijan
- Bash Bolagh, West Azerbaijan

== See also ==
- Dash Bolagh (disambiguation)
