= Düyərli =

Düyərli or Dugyarli or Dugyarly or Dyugyarli or Dyukyarli may refer to:

- Düyərli, Shamkir, Azerbaijan
- Düyərli, Tartar, Azerbaijan
