= Kyur =

Kyur may refer to:

- Kür, a village in the Shamkir Rayon of Azerbaijan
- KYUR, a television station (virtual channel 13, digital channel 12) licensed to Anchorage, Alaska, United States
