= Məşədihüseynli =

Coordinates: 40°52′N 46°06′E

Məşədihüseynli is a village and municipality in the Shamkir District of Azerbaijan. It has a population of 1,883. The main economic activities are livestock farming and agriculture.
