= Garanuy =

Qaranuy
- Municipality
- Location within Azerbaijan
- Coordinates: 40°55′10″N 46°04′45″E
- Country: Azerbaijan
- Rayon: Shamkir

Population
  - Total: 850
- Time zone: UTC+4 (AZT)
  - Summer (DST): UTC+5 (AZT)

Garanuy (also, Karanuy and Karanyuy) is a village and municipality in the Shamkir Rayon of Azerbaijan. It has a population of 850.
