= Nüzgər =

Nərimanlı
- Location within Azerbaijan
- Coordinates: 40°41′13″N 46°05′06″E
- Country: Azerbaijan
- Rayon: Shamkir
- Time zone: UTC+4 (AZT)
  - Summer (DST): UTC+5 (AZT)

Narimanly (also, Nuzger) is a village in the Shamkir Rayon of Azerbaijan.
