= Könüllü =

- Municipality
- Location within Azerbaijan
- Coordinates: 40°47′03″N 46°14′29″E
- Country: Azerbaijan
- Rayon: Shamkir

Population
  - Total: 4,019
- Time zone: UTC+4 (AZT)
  - Summer (DST): UTC+5 (AZT)

Könüllü (also, Kënyullyu) is a village and municipality in the Shamkir Rayon of Azerbaijan. It has a population of 4,019.
