= Şiştəpə =

- Municipality
- Location within Azerbaijan
- Coordinates: 40°50′48″N 45°55′40″E
- Country: Azerbaijan
- Rayon: Shamkir

Population
  - Total: 5,259
- Time zone: UTC+4 (AZT)
  - Summer (DST): UTC+5 (AZT)

Şiştəpə (also, Shishtepe) is a village and municipality in the Shamkir Rayon of Azerbaijan. It has a population of 5,259.

This village surrounds a hill named "Shishtapa" (Shish (orig:Şiş): High and Tapa (orig:Təpə-Hill)). Placed 5 km far from Shamkir Rayonu.
