= Sarıtəpə =

Village and municipality in Shamkir Rayon, Azerbaijan

Sarıtəpə is a village and municipality in the Shamkir Rayon of Azerbaijan founded in 1988. It has a population of 1,939.
