= Varlı Həyat =

- Municipality
- Location within Azerbaijan
- Coordinates: 40°41′39″N 45°58′18″E
- Country: Azerbaijan
- Rayon: Shamkir

Population
  - Total: 128
- Time zone: UTC+4 (AZT)
  - Summer (DST): UTC+5 (AZT)

Varlı Həyat is a village and municipality in the Shamkir Rayon of Azerbaijan. It has a population of 128.
