= Miskinli =

Miskinli or Misginli may refer to:

- Miskinli, Gadabay, Azerbaijan
- Miskinli, Shamkir, Azerbaijan
