= Atabay =

Atabay may refer to:

== People ==
- Kambiz Atabay (1939–2025), Iranian sports administrator

== Places ==
- Atabəy, Azerbaijan
- Atabay, a barangay in Salcedo, Ilocos Sur, Philippines
- Atabay, a barangay in Ayungon, Negros Oriental, Philippines
- Atabay, a barangay in San Jose, Antique, Philippines
- Atabay, a barangay in San Remigio, Antique, Philippines
- Atabay, a barangay in Alcoy, Cebu, Philippines
- Atabay, a barangay in Hilongos, Leyte, Philippines
- Atabay, a barangay in Alimodian, Iloilo, Philippines
- Atabay, a barangay in Tobias Fornier, Antique, Philippines
