= Ahmad Jamil (poet) =

Ahmad Jamil Əhməd Cəmil
- Born: Ahmad Sattar oghlu Jamilzade; October 20, 1913; Erivan, Erivan uezd, Erivan Governorate, Russian Empire
- Died: September 24, 1977 (aged 63); Baku, Azerbaijan SSR, USSR
- Occupations: poet, writer
- Years active: 1928–1977
- Awards: State Prize of the Azerbaijan SSR

Ahmad Sattar oghlu Jamilzade (Azerbaijani: Əhməd Səttar oğlu Cəmilzadə, October 20, 1913 – September 24, 1977), known as Ahmad Jamil, was an Azerbaijani poet, member of Union of Azerbaijani Writers (1939), laureate of the State Prize of the Azerbaijan SSR (1980).

== Biography ==
Ahmad Jamil was born on October 20, 1913, in the city of Erivan, Erivan Governorate. When he was in the seventh grade of secondary school, his first poem called "Gözel Qafqaz" was published in 1928 in "Qızıl Gəncə" magazine. Actively participated in the Ganja branch of the Society of Proletarian Writers of Azerbaijan. His poems were published from time to time in the newspapers and magazines "Qızıl Gəncə", "Dağıstan füqərası", "Gənc bolşevik", "Hücum", "İnqilab və mədəniyyət". Then he continued his education at the Faculty of Literature of the Pedagogical Institute in Baku (1930–1933).

He was a Methodist, a secondary and higher school teacher in the village of Zayam, Shamkir District (1933–1936), then in Ganja (1936–1940). From September 1940, he worked as a consultant in the poetry section of the Union of Azerbaijani Soviet Writers, as a literary worker and secretary in charge of "Literary newspaper", then he was elected as the secretary in charge of the union (1940–1942).

During the World War II, he worked in the editorial offices of North Caucasus, Crimean front newspapers ("Battle strike", "Attack", "Forward for the Motherland") (1942–1943). Executive Secretary of the Writers' Union board of directors (1944–1947) and elected member of the board of directors. For a long time, he was a member of the editorial board of "Ədəbiyyat qəzeti" newspaper, "Azərbaycan" and "Ulduz" magazines.

He worked as the editor at Azernashr (1953–1955), consultant at the Ministry of Culture of Azerbaijan (1956–1959), editor of "Azərbaycan" magazine (1959–1960), chief editor of Azernashr (1962–1963), editor at Ganjlik publishing house (1964–1967), editor-in-chief of "Ulduz" magazine (1973–1977).

For his services, he was twice awarded the Order of the Red Banner of Labour, honorary decree of the Presidium of the Supreme Soviet of Azerbaijan and medals.

He died on September 24, 1977, in Baku.
