= Xuluf =

Human settlement in Azerbaijan

Coordinates: 40°51′N 46°08′E

Xuluf is a village in the municipality of Keçili in the Shamkir Rayon of Azerbaijan.
