= Yeniabad =

- Municipality
- Location within Azerbaijan
- Coordinates: 40°53′21″N 46°10′12″E
- Country: Azerbaijan
- Rayon: Shamkir

Population
  - Total: 1,671
- Time zone: UTC+4 (AZT)
  - Summer (DST): UTC+5 (AZT)

Yeniabad (also, Bitdili and Bittili) is a village and municipality in the Shamkir Rayon of Azerbaijan. It has a population of 1,671.
