= Ahmad Jamil =

Ahmad Jamil may refer to:

- Ahmad Jamil (poet) (1913-1977), Azerbaijani poet
- Ahmad Jamil (footballer) (born 1999), Emirati footballer
- Ahmed Jamil Madani, Saudi Arabian footballer
