= Qaracəmirli =

Garajamirli Qaracəmirli
- Municipality
- Location within Azerbaijan Location within West and Central Asia
- Coordinates: 40°51′01″N 46°13′05″E
- Country: Azerbaijan
- Rayon: Shamkir

Population
  - Total: 5,243
- Time zone: UTC+4 (AZT)
- Postal code: AZ5721
- Area code: (+994)

Qaracəmirli (also, Garajamirli, Qaracamirli and Karadzhamirli) is a village and municipality in the Shamkir Rayon / Shamkhor of Azerbaijan. It has a population of 5,243.

In 2008, the ruins of a palace dating to the 6th–4th centuries BC were discovered in the village. The building’s foundation was constructed from river stone, while the walls were made of the sun-dried brick typical of that period.

== See also ==
- Persian propyleion, Karacamirli
