= Takhnali =

- Village
- Location within Azerbaijan
- Coordinates: 40°55′26″N 46°11′46″E
- Country: Azerbaijan
- Rayon: Shamkir
- Time zone: UTC+4 (AZT)
  - Summer (DST): UTC+5 (AZT)

Takhnali is a village in the Shamkir Rayon of Azerbaijan.
