= Əliyaqublu =

Coordinates: 40°50′N 46°05′E

Aliyaqublu is a village and municipality in the Shamkir Rayon of Azerbaijan. It has a population of 2,208. The village mosque was constructed in 1998.
