= Dəllər Daşbulaq =

- Municipality
- Location within Azerbaijan
- Coordinates: 40°54′23″N 46°02′44″E
- Country: Azerbaijan
- Rayon: Shamkir

Population
  - Total: 2,101
- Time zone: UTC+4 (AZT)
  - Summer (DST): UTC+5 (AZT)

Dəllər Daşbulaq (also, Daşbulaq and Dashbulak) is a village and municipality in the Shamkir Rayon of Azerbaijan. It has a population of 2,101.
