= Imam Hussein Mosque (Baku) =

Mosque in Baku, Azerbaijan

- Azerbaijani: İmam Hüseyn Məscidi
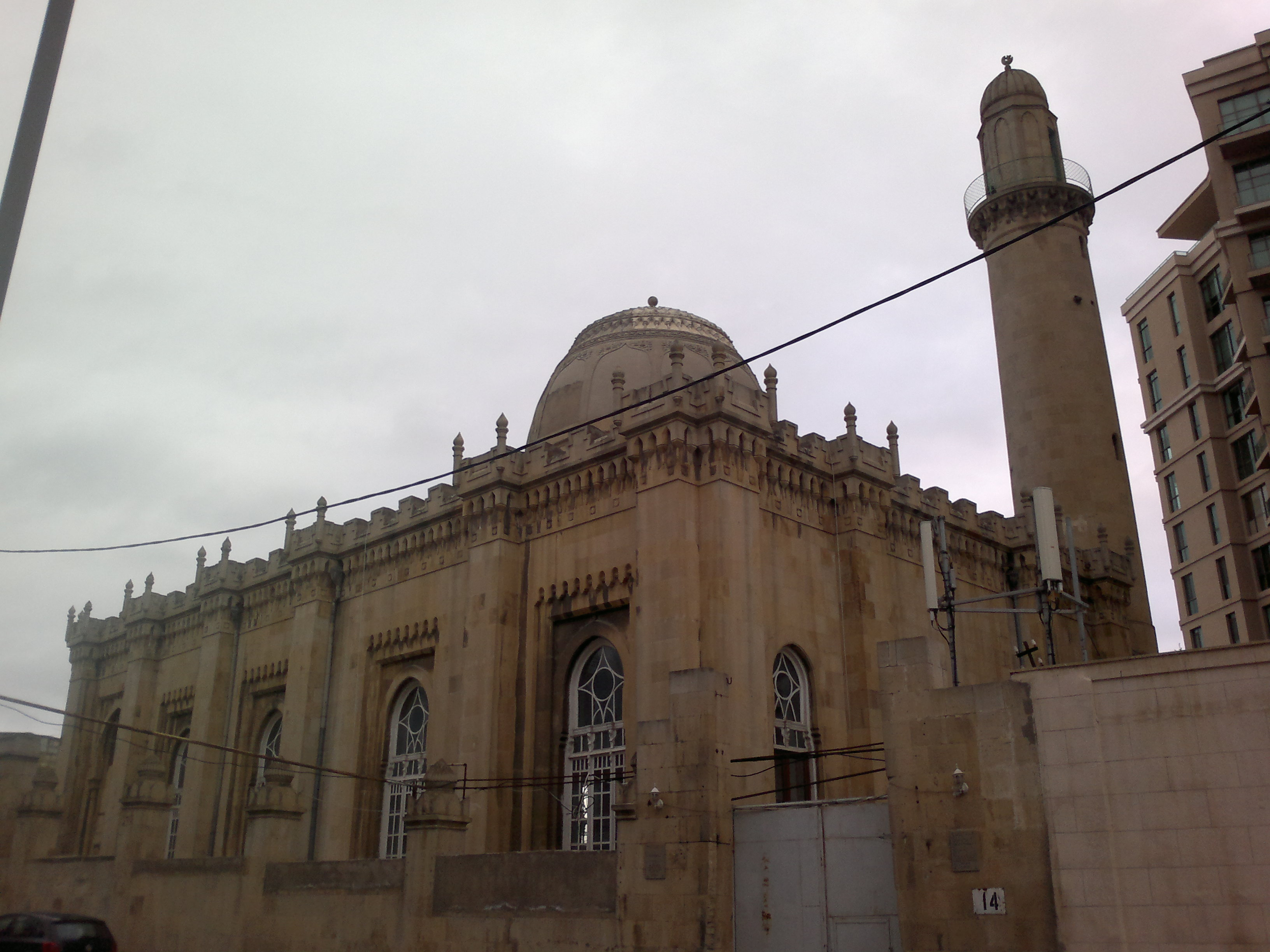

- Location of the mosque in Baku

Religion
- Affiliation: Islam
- Ecclesiastical or organisational status: Mosque (1896–1928); Profane use (1928–1988); Mosque (since 1992)
- Status: Active

Location
- Location: Baku
- Country: Azerbaijan
- Coordinates: 40°22′10″N 49°49′35″E

Architecture
- Architect: Adolf Eichler
- Type: Mosque architecture
- Funded by: Haji Hajibaba Hashimov
- Completed: 1896

Specifications
- Dome: One
- Minaret: One

The Imam Hussein Mosque (Azerbaijani: İmam Hüseyn məscidi), also known as the Ashumov Mosque, is a mosque and historical architectural monument, located in the city of Baku, the capital of Azerbaijan.

Completed in 1896, the former mosque was included in the list of local significant immovable historical and cultural monuments by the decision of the Cabinet of Azerbaijan on August 2, 2001, numbered 132.

Following its restoration, the mosque continued to operate as a place of worship.

== History ==
The mosque was built in 1896 by order of philanthropist Haji Hajibaba Hashimov (Ashumov). It is located on Abdulla Shaik Street, in the Yasamal District of Baku. The architect of the mosque is Adolf Eichler.

After the Soviet occupation, they officially started to fight against religion in 1928. In December of the same year, the Central Committee of the Communist Party of Azerbaijan handed over many mosques, churches and synagogues to clubs for use in educational purposes. If there were 3,000 mosques in Azerbaijan in 1917, in 1927 this number was 1,700, and in 1933 it was 17. Imam Hussain mosque is also closed for worship during this period. In the early days, a warehouse and a small factory producing table lamps operated here. Since 1978, the Baku branch of the "Hiproteatr" institute has been located in the building of the mosque. Since 1988, the mosque has started functioning again at the initiative of the Tawba society.

After Azerbaijan restored its independence, the mosque was included in the list of local significant immovable historical and cultural monuments by the decision of the Cabinet of Ministers of the Republic of Azerbaijan on August 2, 2001, numbered 132. Since 2010, the mosque has been actively engaged in religious activities under the state registration. In 2017, extensive renovation and restoration works began at the mosque. Additionally, a ceremony hall with a capacity of 130 people was constructed on the mosque's premises. In 2018, the mosque was reopened for the worship of the faithful.

== Architecture ==
The mosque is located a bit behind the red line of the street and is surrounded by significant damage. Upon entering through the mosque's portal, there is initially a vestibule, followed by the three-nave structure of the prayer hall. The prayer hall extends along the length of the mosque and culminates with the mihrab. The profile of the supporting arches of the dome follows traditional patterns. While the minaret of the mosque shares common features with other minarets in the Baku-Absheron region, it stands out with its unique characteristics.

A large gallery is located in front of the eastern façade of the prayer hall. Large arched entrances open to the gallery. At the turn of the 19th and 20th centuries, arched galleries were actively used on the facades of religious buildings in the Baku-Absheron region. This new architectural composition observed in the work of Baku architects was formed under the influence of the row of thrones in the Divankhana of the Shirvanshahs Palace Complex and the courtyard surrounding it. The same method was used by Gafar Ismayilov in the Kasim Bey Mosque, Zivar Beg Ahmadbayov in the Taza Pir and Ajdarbey Mosques.

The architect Adolf Eichler used the methods and motifs applied in the construction of the famous Cordoba mosque in the solution of the facade architecture of the building. Its vertical pylons, complementary elements and architectural details were a source of inspiration for the architect.

== See also ==
- Islam in Azerbaijan
- List of mosques in Azerbaijan
- List of mosques in Baku
