= Abbaslı =

Abbasly
- Municipality
- Azerbaijani: Abbaslı
- Location within Azerbaijan
- Coordinates: 40°46′04″N 46°08′10″E
- Country: Azerbaijan
- District: Shamkir

Population
  - Total: 2,970
- Time zone: UTC+4 (AZT)
  - Summer (DST): UTC+5 (AZT)

Abbaslı (also, Abbasly) is a village and municipality in the Shamkir District of Azerbaijan. It has a population of 2,970.
