= Qapanlı, Shamkir =

Qapanlı
- Municipality
- Location within Azerbaijan
- Coordinates: 40°53′N 46°15′E
- Country: Azerbaijan
- Rayon: Shamkir

Population
  - Total: 2,749
- Time zone: UTC+4 (AZT)
  - Summer (DST): UTC+5 (AZT)

Qapanlı (also, Kapanly, known as Məmmədalılar until 1994) is a village and municipality in the Shamkir Rayon of Azerbaijan. It has a population of 2,749.
