= İrmaşlı =

- Municipality
- Location within Azerbaijan
- Coordinates: 40°50′31″N 45°53′15″E
- Country: Azerbaijan
- Rayon: Shamkir

Population
  - Total: 4,001
- Time zone: UTC+4 (AZT)
  - Summer (DST): UTC+5 (AZT)

İrmaşlı (pronounced Irmashly) is a large village and municipality in the Shamkir Rayon of Azerbaijan. It has a population of 4,001.

== History ==
İrmaşlı combines an ancient Azerbaijani settlement with the 19th-century German 'colony' village of Eigenfeld (spelled as Eichenfeld or Aigenfeld in some sources). In 1932 the place was renamed Engelskənd in honour of socialist philosopher Friedrich Engels but after Azerbaijan's independence in 1992 it reverted to the traditional name of İrmaşlı which locals believe is derived from a semi-mythical visit of Roman soldiers to this place in the 1st century.

== Twin Village ==
Strong family ties, probably based on seasonal shepherding traditions, still link the village with Daşbulaq on a hilltop ridge some 15 km southwest which is alternatively known as Dağ İrmaşlı (ie Mountain Irmashli).
