= Gadimgala =

Gadimgala last name Mukhtariyyat
- Municipality
- Location within Azerbaijan
- Coordinates: 40°49′23″N 46°06′19″E
- Country: Azerbaijan
- Rayon: Shamkir

Population
  - Total: 3,088
- Time zone: UTC+4 (AZT)
  - Summer (DST): UTC+5 (AZT)

'Gadimgala(also, Komunist and Mukhtariyat) is a village and municipality in the Shamkir Rayon of Azerbaijan. It has a population of 3,088. The municipality consists of the villages of Muxtariyyət and Miskinli.
