= Çinarlı, Shamkir =

Çinarlı
- Municipality
- Location within Azerbaijan
- Coordinates: 40°46′27″N 46°06′39″E
- Country: Azerbaijan
- Rayon: Shamkir

Population
  - Total: 3,739
- Time zone: UTC+4 (AZT)
  - Summer (DST): UTC+5 (AZT)

Çinarlı (known as Georgsfeld until 1932 and Leninfeld or Lenin until 1992) is a village and municipality in the Shamkir Region of Azerbaijan. It has a population of 3,739.

== History ==
The village was founded by German colonists from Helenendorf (now Goygol) in 1888, where it was named Georgsfeld in honor of Grand Duke George Alexandrovich of Russia. Due to the Russian Empire and German Empire coming into conflict during World War I, the village was renamed to Georgievskoe or Georgiyevsk in 1916.

During the Soviet period as the Azerbaijan SSR, the village was renamed to Leninfeld in 1932. Following the deportation of Caucasus Germans in response to Nazi Germany's invasion of the Soviet Union in World War II, it was renamed to Leninkend in 1942. After the village was declared an urban-type settlement, the settlement was last renamed to Lenin in 1962.
