= Persian propyleion, Karacamirli =

Persian architectural design

Persian propyleion, Karacamirli refers to an Achaemenid Persian "propyleion" (more properly, a pavilion) which was discovered in 2006-2007 near the village of Karacamirli (Qarajamirli) in western Azerbaijan. The main building at the propyleion is a palace of an Achaemenid Persian chief magistrate (a satrapal residence), and was most likely considered to be an important residence in its own day. The palace was built on a 450-by-425-meter garden enclosure. It is built of mudbricks and extends 22 × 23 meters. The height of the building is estimated to be at least 5 meters. The dimensions of the architectural plan come close to similar buildings in Pasargadae and Susa. Matthew P. Canepa notes that although the estate was built within one of the provinces of the Persian Empire, there was "nothing provincial about its architecture". Canepa adds that "its construction methods, materials, and plans are the same as those used at the royal palaces at Persepolis". In terms of architectural forms, the palace at Karacamirli bears close similarities to the forms used at the imperial center of the Achaemenids, especially the hadiš of Xerxes I (r. 486–465 BC).

The Achaemenid site at Karacamirli bears strong similarities with the nearby Achaemenid finds at Gumbati (Georgia) and Sary Tepe (Azerbaijan). It was probably founded shortly after the Achaemenid conquest of the region in the late 6th century BC, most likely during the campaign of Darius the Great (r. 522–486 BC) against the Scythians in 513/2 BC. When the site was built, it was located in the satrapy of Media. Pierre Briant, citing Knauss et al. (2010): "Karacamirli shows us that, even at the periphery of the empire, Persian rule left its grandiose mark". The site was probably abandoned in the dawn of the invasion and assault by Alexander the Great. As there is no evidence of a violent destruction, it may be that the Persian residents of the site took their goods with them as they returned home following the news of the decisive Persian defeat by Alexander and the death of Darius III (r. 336–330 BC).
