= Adolf Eichler =

German architect

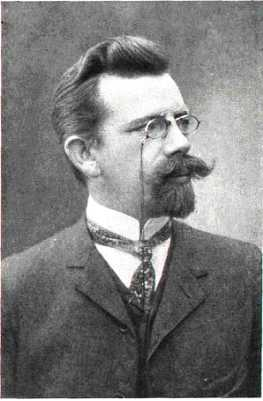
- Born: October 8, 1869; Oryol
- Died: February 5, 1911 (aged 41); Baku
- Occupation: Architect
- Spouse: Lidia Eleonora-Nagel
- Parent(s): Wilhelm Eichler (father); Yelena-Elisabeth Govorko (mother)
- Buildings: Saviour's Church (1899)

Adolf Eichler (November 8, 1869 – February 5, 1911) was a Russian civil architect of German origin, best known for building the Saviour's Church (at the age of 24) and participating in boulevard development, both in Baku. He committed suicide after developing smallpox in 1911.

== Early life and family ==
Adolf Eichler was born on November 8, 1869, to Wilhelm Edward Eichler and Yelena Elisabeth Eichler (née Govorko) in his mother's hometown Oryol. His father moved to Baku already in 1864, his elder sister Wilhelmina Elisabeth (1866) and younger sister Victorina Valentina (1870) were both born in Baku. His younger brother Robert Karl died early at the age of 1 in 1881. After his father's death in 1891 at the age of 66, his education was supervised by his uncle Karl-Edward. He was sent to achieve higher education in St. Petersburg.

== Adult life ==
One of his early works was a school building located on Surakhani streets (nowadays, Dilara Aliyeva) in 1892. His uncle Karl Edward was chosen to council of Lutheran Society of Baku in 1877. Under his authority a plot of land was bought in order to establish a parish building for society in 1895. Nobels were among benefactors to this cause. His uncle's dream came to existence when Adolf constructed the Saviour's Church in 1899. Church was supposed to be in a modern design, like the church in Helenendorf, however Eichler resorted to tradition of German Gothic style. Among his other projects Ashumov's Mosque is also spectacular one. He was appointed chief architect of second section of Baku centrum in 1904. In the same year he established a charity organisation named "Manger".

== Personal life ==
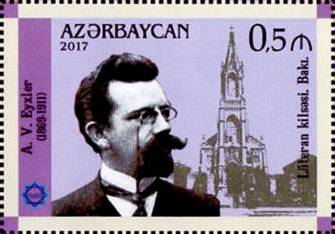
Stamps of Azerbaijan, 2017

He was married to Lidia Eleonora-Nagel on 24 July 1907 who was from a Roman Catholic family. Their children Irene (1908) and Cornelia (1910) were both baptized in Saviour's Church, Baku. However, not long after his second daughter's birth, he contracted smallpox and shot himself on 5 February 1911. He was buried in Lutheran Cemetery of Baku (which was destroyed during Soviet rule in 1928).

== Major works ==
Building	Photo	Designed	Constructed
Imam Husayn Mosque (Former Ashumov's Mosque)		1895	1896
Saviour's Church		1896	1899
