= Shamkir Lutheran Church =

Former Lutheran church, now cultural center, in Şəmkir, Azerbaijan

- Azerbaijani: Alman lüteran kilsəsi
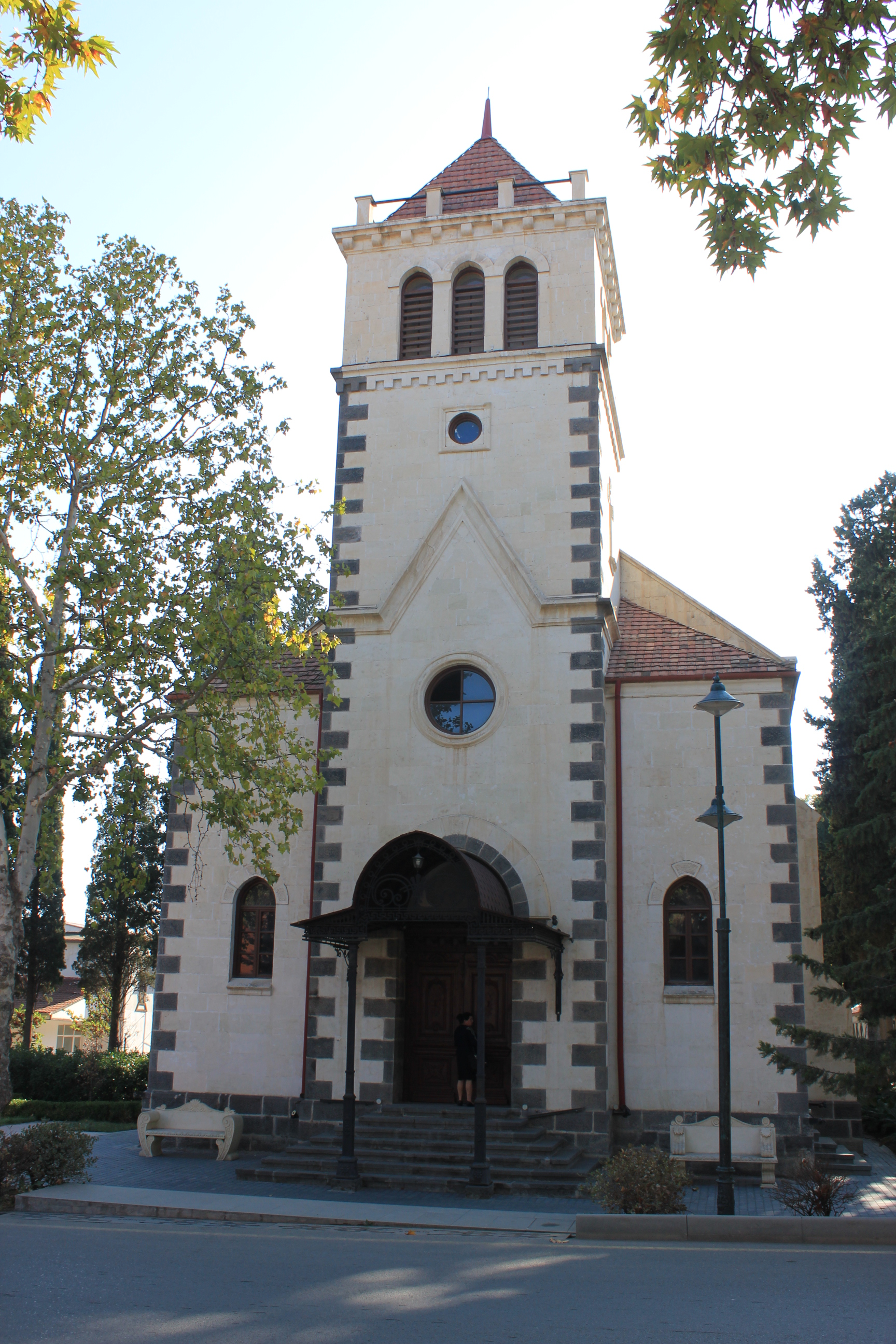
- The former church, now cultural center, in 2018
- Shamkir Lutheran Church
- 40°50′01″N 46°01′24″E
- Address: U. Hajibeyov Street, 57, Şəmkir
- Country: Azerbaijan
- Denomination: German Lutheran Church (former)

History
- Status: Church (1909–1937); Profane use (1941–1991); Cultural center (since 2012)
- Founder: Caucasian Germans

Architecture
- Functional status: Abandoned (as a church); Repurposed
- Architect: Ferdinand Lehmkuhl
- Architectural type: Church
- Style: Romanesque Revival
- Completed: 1909

The Shamkir Lutheran Church (Azerbaijani: Alman lüteran kilsəsi) is a former German Lutheran church, and now historical architectural monument and cultural center, located in the city of Shamkir, Azerbaijan.

After Azerbaijan regained its independence, the church was included in the list of local significant immovable historical and cultural monuments by the decision No. 132 of the Cabinet of Ministers of the Republic of Azerbaijan on August 2, 2001.

== History ==
In 1817, with the approval of Russian Tsar Alexander I, hundreds of German families belonging to the Lutheran-Pietist faith from the Swabian region of Germany were relocated to the territory of the Russian Empire. By 1819, 500 families from Württemberg were settled in the Elisabethpol Governorate of Azerbaijan. After the establishment of the first German colony in Azerbaijan, called Helenendorf, the foundation of the second German colony, Annenfeld, was laid about 40 km (25 mi) away.

In 1909, the Lutheran Church was constructed in Annenfeld in the Romanesque Revival style, sponsored by Johann Beppl and Johann Bek's endowment. The architect responsible for the construction of the church was Ferdinand Lemkul.

=== Soviet occupation ===
Soviet occupation led to the official initiation of the anti-religious campaign in 1928. In December of the same year, the Azerbaijan Communist Party Central Committee transferred many mosques, churches, and synagogues to the balance of educational clubs for enlightening purposes. Between 1936 and 1938, all Lutheran church priests in the country were arrested. The last pastor of the church, Emil Roisch, was initially arrested in 1931. Though released later, he was rearrested in 1937, accused of anti-Soviet and religious propaganda, and subsequently sentenced to execution by firing squad by the NKVD troika. Following the expulsion of Germans in 1941, the church ceased its activities. Later on, the building was used as a Cultural House, Teachers' House, and a History Ethnography Museum.

=== After independence ===
After Azerbaijan regained independence, the church building was included in the list of locally significant historical and cultural monuments by the decision No. 132 of the Cabinet of Ministers of the Republic of Azerbaijan on August 2, 2001.

Due to a lack of repairs and restoration for an extended period in the 1990s, the building fell into a dilapidated condition. In 2012, as part of the "Address of Tolerance - Azerbaijan" project by the Heydar Aliyev Foundation, the church building underwent comprehensive restoration under the initiative of the Ministry of Culture and Tourism of Azerbaijan. The area surrounding the church was developed, and a park was established. An organ was installed in the church to facilitate religious services and musical events.

== See also ==
- Germany–Azerbaijan relations
- Christianity in Azerbaijan
