= Miskinli, Shamkir =

Miskinli
- Location within Azerbaijan
- Coordinates: 40°49′04″N 46°06′38″E
- Country: Azerbaijan
- Rayon: Shamkir
- Municipality: Muxtariyyət
- Time zone: UTC+4 (AZT)
  - Summer (DST): UTC+5 (AZT)

Miskinli (also, Misginli and Miskinlyu) is a village in the Shamkir Rayon of Azerbaijan. The village forms part of the municipality of Muxtariyyət.
