= Keçili, Shamkir =

Keçili
- Municipality
- Location within Azerbaijan
- Coordinates: 40°51′20″N 46°09′45″E
- Country: Azerbaijan
- Rayon: Shamkir

Population
  - Total: 5,704
- Time zone: UTC+4 (AZT)
  - Summer (DST): UTC+5 (AZT)

Keçili (also, Kechili and Ketschily, known as Plankənd until 1994) is a village and municipality in the Shamkir Rayon of Azerbaijan. It has a population of 5,704. The municipality consists of the villages of Keçili and Xuluf.
