= Dallyar Jirdakhan =

Dallyar Jirdakhan Dəllər Cırdaxan
- Municipality
- Location within Azerbaijan
- Coordinates: 40°53′55″N 46°04′43″E
- Country: Azerbaijan
- Rayon: Shamkir

Government
  - Executive: Ali Salmanov

Population
  - Total: 3,740
- Time zone: UTC+4 (AZT)
  - Summer (DST): UTC+5 (AZT)

Dallyar Jirdakhan (also Dəllər Cırdaxan, Jafar Jabbarly) is a village and municipality in the Shamkir Rayon of Azerbaijan.It has a population of 3,662.

== History ==
Dallyar Jirdakhan was settled at the beginning of the 18th century. During the first 30 years of the 20th century the village was occupied seasonally in the summer or winter. Areas the village are called Gimirly, Hajimamedly and Mollaly. It is sometimes referred to by the name: Jafar Jabbarly. Residents of the village are also called Jafar Jabbarly. There are a variety of opinions about the meaning of Dallyar name. According to one version, this name is associated with Koroghlu's army, which are called "Deliler".

== Culture and education ==
There is a school, kindergarten, hospital and library in the village. The students study in "Dallyar Jirdakhan secondary school in the name of Shahin Amirov". The park which is named Ashig Yehya bey Dilgam is here and there is a club. It serves the country folk.

== Geography ==
The village of Dallyar Jırdakhan is 4 kilometers from the right bank of the Kura River. It is in the plains of Ganja-Gazakh economic region. The village is situated 10 km north from Shamkir city and 5 km from Dallyar railway station, which is situated on Baku-Tbilisi road.

== Population ==
The current population is 3662. The vast majority of the population is ethnic Azeris, who are Shia Muslims. Also Meskhetian Turks live in the village.

1977	1989	2011	2012
1659	2813	3542	3662
