= Zəyəm Cırdaxan =

- Municipality
- Location within Azerbaijan
- Coordinates: 40°53′12″N 45°49′35″E
- Country: Azerbaijan
- Rayon: Shamkir

Population
  - Total: 7,546
- Time zone: UTC+4 (AZT)
  - Summer (DST): UTC+5 (AZT)

Zəyəm Cırdaxan (also Dzegam-Dzhirdakhan, Dzegam-Dzhyrdakhan, and Zeyamdzhirdakhan) is a village and the most populous municipality, except for the capital Şəmkir, in the Shamkir Rayon of Azerbaijan. It has a population of 7,546.
