= Kür =

- Municipality
- Location within Azerbaijan
- Coordinates: 40°55′27″N 46°11′36″E
- Country: Azerbaijan
- Rayon: Shamkir

Population
  - Total: 15,372
- Time zone: UTC+4 (AZT)
  - Summer (DST): UTC+5 (AZT)

Kür (also, Kyur) is a village and municipality in the Shamkir Rayon in north-western Azerbaijan. It has a population of 15372.
