= Dash Bolagh-e Olya =

Dash Bolagh-e Olya داشبلاغ عليا
- Village
- Location within Iran
- Coordinates: 37°03′18″N 46°55′21″E
- Country: Iran
- Province: East Azerbaijan
- County: Charuymaq
- Bakhsh: Central
- Rural District: Charuymaq-e Jonubegharbi

Population (2006)
  - Total: 66
- Time zone: UTC+3:30 (IRST)
  - Summer (DST): UTC+4:30 (IRDT)

Dash Bolagh-e Olya (Persian: داشبلاغ عليا, also Romanized as Dāsh Bolāgh-e ‘Olyā; also known as Dāsh Bolāghī-ye ‘Olyā) is a village in Charuymaq-e Jonubegharbi Rural District, in the Central District of Charuymaq County, East Azerbaijan Province, Iran. At the 2006 census, its population was 66, in 11 families.
