= Tatarlı, Goranboy =

Tatarlı is a village and municipality in the Goranboy Rayon of Azerbaijan. It has a population of 1,941.
