= Dash Bolagh, Meyaneh =

Dash Bolagh داش بلاغ
- Village
- Location within Iran
- Coordinates: 37°23′46″N 47°29′28″E
- Country: Iran
- Province: East Azerbaijan
- County: Meyaneh
- Bakhsh: Central
- Rural District: Owch Tappeh-ye Sharqi

Population (2006)
  - Total: 141
- Time zone: UTC+3:30 (IRST)
  - Summer (DST): UTC+4:30 (IRDT)

Dash Bolagh (Persian: داش بلاغ, also Romanized as Dāsh Bolāgh) is a village in Owch Tappeh-ye Sharqi Rural District, in the Central District of Meyaneh County, East Azerbaijan Province, Iran. At the 2006 census, its population was 141, in 26 families.
