= Hüseynbəyli, Qazax =

Hüseynbəyli is a municipality and village in the Qazakh Rayon of Azerbaijan. It has a population of 1,468.
