= Dashbolagh-e Moghar =

Dashbolagh-e Moghar داش بلاغ مغار
- Village
- Location within Iran
- Coordinates: 38°36′49″N 47°24′37″E
- Country: Iran
- Province: East Azerbaijan
- County: Ahar
- Bakhsh: Central
- Rural District: Vargahan

Population (2006)
  - Total: 160
- Time zone: UTC+3:30 (IRST)
  - Summer (DST): UTC+4:30 (IRDT)

Dashbolagh-e Moghar (Persian: داش بلاغ مغار, romanized: Dāshbolāgh-e Moghār; also known as Dāshbolāgh) is a village in Vargahan Rural District, in the Central District of Ahar County, East Azerbaijan Province, Iran. At the 2006 census, its population was 160, in 29 families.
