= Atabəy =

- Municipality
- Location within Azerbaijan
- Coordinates: 40°45′02″N 45°49′17″E
- Country: Azerbaijan
- Rayon: Shamkir

Population
  - Total: 654
- Time zone: UTC+4 (AZT)
  - Summer (DST): UTC+5 (AZT)

Atabəy (also, Atabek and Atabey) is a village and municipality in the Shamkir Rayon of Azerbaijan. It has a population of 654.
