= Tatarlı, Shamkir =

Tatarlı
- Municipality
- Location within Azerbaijan
- Coordinates: 40°51′08″N 45°44′21″E
- Country: Azerbaijan
- Rayon: Shamkir

Population
  - Total: 2,487
- Time zone: UTC+4 (AZT)
  - Summer (DST): UTC+5 (AZT)

Tatarlı (also, Tatarly) is a village and municipality in the Shamkir Rayon of Azerbaijan. It has a population of 2,487.
