= Dambulaq =

- Location within Azerbaijan Location within East Zangezur Economic Region
- Coordinates: 39°51′25″N 46°19′37″E
- Country: Azerbaijan
- District: Lachin
- Time zone: UTC+4 (AZT)
  - Summer (DST): UTC+5 (AZT)

Dambulaq (Dambulag) is a village in the Lachin District of Azerbaijan.
