= Frédéric DuBois de Montperreux =

Swiss traveller and antiquarian (1798–1850)

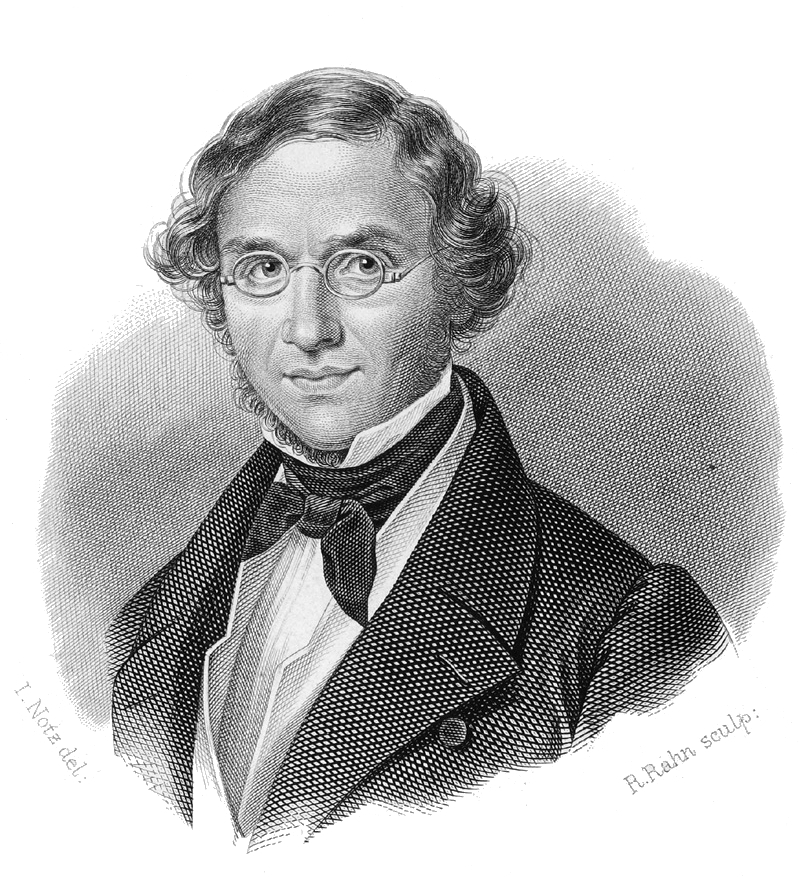
Frédéric DuBois de Montperreux

Frédéric DuBois de Montperreux (28 May 1798 – 7 May 1850) was a Swiss traveller and antiquarian.

== Life and career ==
Born in Môtiers, he was the son of a merchant. Educated in Neuchâtel, he soon moved to Courland and Lithuania. In 1829–31, he studed at the University of Berlin studied under classical scholar August Boeckh, geographer Carl Ritter, geologist Leopold von Buch, and naturalist Alexander von Humboldt.

He travelled alone to the southern regions of the Russian Empire in 1833–34 on an exploratory journey, thereafter completing the six-volume Voyage Autour du Caucase (1839–43). He taught archaeology at the Neuchâtel Academy starting in 1838. He excavated and took an interest in medieval monuments. He died in Peseux.

== Legacy ==
His travelogue to the Caucasus introduced the monuments of the region to modern Europe. It is regarded as an important early scholarly publication on Armenian architecture. Christina Maranci wrote that Dubois was "the first westerner to identify an Armenian style of architecture" and that his work earn Dubois "the most significant position in the nineteenth-century scholarship on Armenian architecture."

His views on Georgian architecture has received mixed reception. He believed Georgians were "loyal copyists" of the Armenians, prompting some scholars to dismiss his views. The Georgian Encyclopedia notes that Georgian art historians have refuted his "erroneous theory" that saw the Georgian style as a branch or reflection of Byzantine and Armenian architecture.

The Georgian Encyclopedia describes him as "the first Western European researcher of the geological structure of Georgia and the entire Caucasus."
