= Daşbulaq, Shamkir =

Daşbulaq
- Municipality
- Location within Azerbaijan
- Coordinates: 40°56′48″N 45°48′55″E
- Country: Azerbaijan
- Rayon: Shamkir

Population
  - Total: 591
- Time zone: UTC+4 (AZT)
  - Summer (DST): UTC+5 (AZT)

Daşbulaq is a village and municipality in the Shamkir Rayon of Azerbaijan. It has a population of 591 and sits on a ridgetop in the foothills of the Lesser Caucasus. It is sometimes known as Dağ İrmaşlı as there is a strong family connection between the village and the small town of İrmaşlı on the plains below, though at present the only roads between the two are unpaved and unsuitable for city cars. There is a small, recently semi-restored Caucasian-Albanian church ruin on the lip of the ridge surveying a wide panorama to the north.
