= Ferdinand Lehmkuhl =

Engineer-technologist and architect

- Born: 1823
- Died: Unknown
- Occupation: Architect
- Buildings: Tagiyev's Theater; Shamkir Lutheran Church

Ferdinand Lehmkuhl was an engineer-technologist and architect.

Between 1880 and 1889, Ferdinand Lehmkuhl worked as an engineer-technologist in the Baku City Duma. He participated in the construction of several buildings in Baku.

== About ==
Ferdinand Lehmkuhl was born in 1823. From 1880 to 1889, he worked as an engineer-technologist in the Baku City Duma. He was involved in the construction of various buildings in Baku. His first project in 1880 was the design of the "Sun Clock." His main projects were low-rise residential buildings, mostly constructed in neighborhoods such as Kubinka, Ganly-Tapa, Dagustu, Chamberakend districts, and within the Inner City during that period. In 1883, he supervised the construction of Tagiyev's Theater designed by the architect Khrisanf Vasilyev. In 1909, he became the architect of the Lutheran Church built in the Roman Gothic style in Annenfeld, funded by Johann Beppl and Johann Bek.
