= Dash Bolagh, Kurdistan =

Dash Bolagh داش بلاغ
- Village
- Location within Iran
- Coordinates: 35°00′25″N 48°07′32″E
- Country: Iran
- Province: Kurdistan
- County: Qorveh
- Bakhsh: Chaharduli
- Rural District: Chaharduli-ye Sharqi

Population (2006)
  - Total: 62
- Time zone: UTC+3:30 (IRST)
  - Summer (DST): UTC+4:30 (IRDT)

Dash Bolagh (Persian: داش بلاغ, also Romanized as Dāsh Bolāgh; also known as Dasht Bulāq) is a village in Chaharduli-ye Sharqi Rural District, Chaharduli District, Qorveh County, Kurdistan Province, Iran. At the 2006 census, its population was 62, in 13 families. The village is populated by Azerbaijanis.
