= Bash Bolagh, East Azerbaijan =

Bash Bolagh باش بلاغ
- Village
- Location within Iran
- Coordinates: 37°15′44″N 48°07′56″E
- Country: Iran
- Province: East Azerbaijan
- County: Meyaneh
- Bakhsh: Kaghazkonan
- Rural District: Kaghazkonan-e Markazi

Population (2006)
  - Total: 24
- Time zone: UTC+3:30 (IRST)
  - Summer (DST): UTC+4:30 (IRDT)

Bash Bolagh (Persian: باش بلاغ, also Romanized as Bāsh Bolāgh; also known as Bash-Bulag, Bāshbūlāgh, and Bāshbulāq) is a village in Kaghazkonan-e Markazi Rural District, Kaghazkonan District, Meyaneh County, East Azerbaijan Province, Iran. At the 2006 census, its population was 24, in 8 families.
