= Dash Bolagh-e Pain =

Dash Bolagh-e Pain داشبلاغ پائين
- Village
- Location within Iran
- Coordinates: 37°03′06″N 46°55′14″E
- Country: Iran
- Province: East Azerbaijan
- County: Charuymaq
- Bakhsh: Central
- Rural District: Charuymaq-e Jonubegharbi

Population (2006)
  - Total: 138
- Time zone: UTC+3:30 (IRST)
  - Summer (DST): UTC+4:30 (IRDT)

Dash Bolagh-e Pain (Persian: داشبلاغ پائين, also Romanized as Dāsh Bolāgh-e Pā’īn; also known as Dāsh Bolāghī-ye Soflá) is a village in Charuymaq-e Jonubegharbi Rural District, in the Central District of Charuymaq County, East Azerbaijan Province, Iran. At the 2006 census, its population was 138, in 27 families.
