= Shamil Fatullayev =

Shamil Fatullayev Şamil Fətullayev
- Born: 24 December 1928; Derbend, Dagestan ASSR, USSR
- Died: 10 March 2015 (aged 86); Baku, Azerbaijan
- Education: Azerbaijan Polytechnic Institute
- Occupation: Architect
- Awards

Shamil Seyfulla oghlu Fatullayev (Azerbaijani: Şamil Seyfulla oğlu Fətullayev, 24 December 1928—10 March 2015) was an Azerbaijani-Soviet architect, Doctor of Architectural Sciences, professor, full member of ANAS (academic) (2014), Honored Architect of the Azerbaijan SSR (1979), member of the Union of Azerbaijani Architects (1965).

== Biography ==
In 1953, he graduated from the architectural faculty of the Azerbaijan Polytechnic Institute. In 1959, he graduated from the postgraduate course of the Institute of Architecture and Art of the Academy of Sciences of Azerbaijan. In 1990, he became a professor. He was known for his study of the history of Azerbaijani architecture in the XIX-XX centuries.

He died on March 10, 2015, in Baku.

== Awards ==
- State Prize of the Azerbaijan SSR — April 26, 1988
- Order of the Badge of Honour — 1986
- Medal "Veteran of Labour" — April 25, 1989
- Honored Architect of the Azerbaijan SSR — December 5, 1979
- Shohrat Order — April 19, 2000
