= Daşbulaq, Shaki =

Daşbulaq
- Municipality
- Location within Azerbaijan Location within Shaki-Zagatala Economic Region
- Coordinates: 41°04′45″N 47°02′08″E
- Country: Azerbaijan
- Rayon: Shaki

Population
  - Total: 434
- Time zone: UTC+4 (AZT)
  - Summer (DST): UTC+5 (AZT)

Daşbulaq (also, Dashbulag and Dashbulak) is a village and municipality in the Shaki Rayon of Azerbaijan. It has a population of 434.
