= Hüseynbəyli, Fuzuli =

Hüseynbəyli
- Location within Azerbaijan Location within Karabakh Economic Region
- Coordinates: 39°36′01″N 47°08′35″E
- Country: Azerbaijan
- District: Fuzuli
- Time zone: UTC+4 (AZT)

Hüseynbəyli is a village in the Fuzuli District of Azerbaijan.
