= Dashbolagh, Ahar =

Dashbolagh داش بلاغ
- Village
- Location within Iran
- Coordinates: 38°39′25″N 47°26′44″E
- Country: Iran
- Province: East Azerbaijan
- County: Ahar
- Bakhsh: Central
- Rural District: Vargahan

Population (2006)
  - Total: 104
- Time zone: UTC+3:30 (IRST)
  - Summer (DST): UTC+4:30 (IRDT)

Dashbolagh (Persian: داش بلاغ, romanized: Dāshbolāgh) is a village in Vargahan Rural District, in the Central District of Ahar County, East Azerbaijan Province, Iran. At the 2006 census, its population was 104, in 23 families. In 2016, the population dropped to 49.
