= Düyərli, Shamkir =

Düyərli
- Municipality
- Location within Azerbaijan
- Coordinates: 40°55′09″N 45°50′58″E
- Country: Azerbaijan
- Rayon: Shamkir

Population
  - Total: 7,496
- Time zone: UTC+4 (AZT)
  - Summer (DST): UTC+5 (AZT)

Düyərli (also, Dugyarli, Dugyarly, Dyugyarli, and Dyukyarli) is a village and municipality in the Shamkir Rayon of Azerbaijan. It has a population of 7,496.
