= Zəyəm, Qakh =

Zəyəm
- Municipality
- Location within Azerbaijan Location within Shaki-Zagatala Economic Region
- Coordinates: 41°24′42″N 46°40′55″E
- Country: Azerbaijan
- Rayon: Qakh

Population
  - Total: 1,553
- Time zone: UTC+4 (AZT)
  - Summer (DST): UTC+5 (AZT)

Zəyəm (also, Zagam, Zagyam, and Zeyam; Avar: Закам) is a village and municipality in the Qakh Rayon of Azerbaijan. It has a population of 1,553. It was named in memory of the historic bazaar town of Zagem, destroyed in the early 17th century, but there is no proof that this was Zagem's original site, which was on the bank of the Alazani River.
