= Zəyəm, Zaqatala =

Zəyəm
- Municipality
- Location within Azerbaijan Location within Shaki-Zagatala Economic Region
- Coordinates: 41°33′N 46°44′E
- Country: Azerbaijan
- Rayon: Zaqatala

Population
  - Total: 767
- Time zone: UTC+4 (AZT)
  - Summer (DST): UTC+5 (AZT)

Zəyəm (also, Zagam and Zagyam) is a village and municipality in the Zaqatala Rayon of Azerbaijan. It has a population of 767.
