= Zəyəm, Shamkir =

Zəyəm
- Municipality
- Location within Azerbaijan
- Coordinates: 40°53′58″N 45°53′09″E
- Country: Azerbaijan
- Rayon: Shamkir

Population (2010)
  - Total: 7,907
- Time zone: UTC+4 (AZT)
  - Summer (DST): UTC+5 (AZT)

Zəyəm (also, Dzagam, Dzegam, Dzegan, Guseynbeili, Guseynbeyli, Pzegam, and Star Agozam) is a village and municipality in the Shamkir Rayon of Azerbaijan. It has a population of 7,775.
