= Shamkir District =

District in northwestern Azerbaijan

Coordinates: 40°49′57″N 46°1′35″E

- District
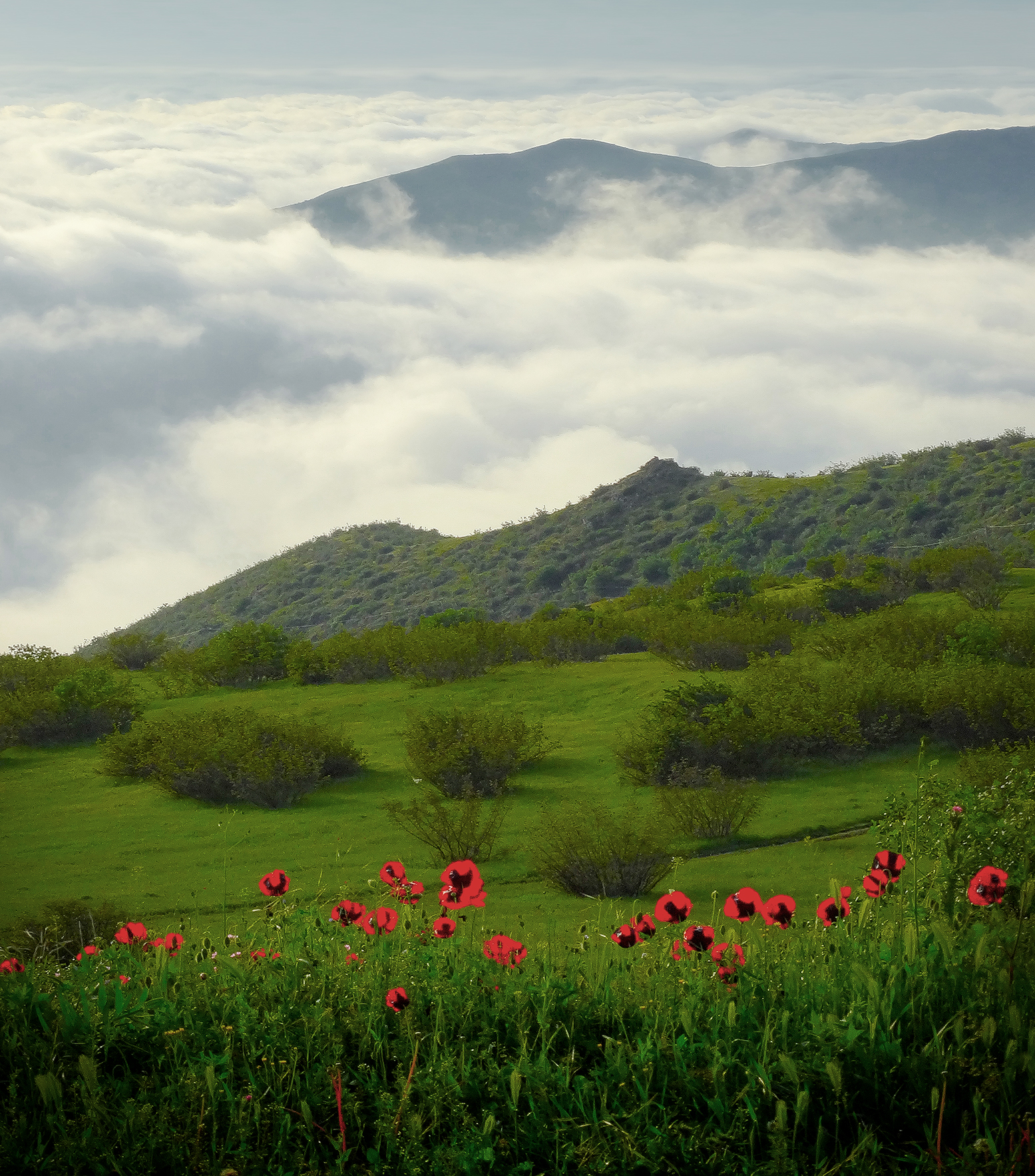

- Map of Azerbaijan showing Shamkir District
- Country: Azerbaijan
- Region: Gazakh-Tovuz
- Established: 8 August 1930
- Capital: Shamkir
- Settlements: 66

Government
  - Governor: Rashad Taghiyev

Area
  - Total: 1,660 km^{2} (640 sq mi)

Population (2020)
  - Total: 219,500
  - Density: 132/km^{2} (342/sq mi)
- Time zone: UTC+4 (AZT)
- Postal code: 5700
- Website: shamkir-ih.gov.az

Shamkir District (Azerbaijani: Şəmkir rayonu) is one of the 66 districts of Azerbaijan. It is located in the north-west of the country and belongs to the Gazakh-Tovuz Economic Region. The district borders the districts of Gadabay, Tovuz, Samukh, Goygol, and Dashkasan. Its capital and largest city is Shamkir. As of 2020, the district had a population of 219,500.

== Overview ==
The district includes one city, Shamkir city; seven city-type settlements, which include Chinarlı settlement, Dallar settlement, Zayam settlement, and Kura settlement; and 58 villages.

There are 59 large and middle-size schools, 53 pre-schools, 81 secondary education schools, 1 technical vocational establishments, 22 hospitals and healthcare offices, and 156 cultural establishments in the raion.

=== Statistics ===
General territory	1660.00 km^{2}
General area of the agricultural land	1245.00 km^{2}
Area of the land unfit for agricultural use	415.00 km^{2}
Area of the pastures for cattle-breeding	827.00 km^{2}
General area of the planted land	388.00 km^{2}
General area of the fruit gardens	27.70 km^{2}

=== Population ===
The population of the district is 221,200 people with 33.49% being urban and 66.51% living in the country. An estimated population density 113.49 person/km^{2}. Men constitute 49.58% of the population, and women 50.42%. Children make up 11.26% of the population, while 33.18% of overall district population are residents below the age of 18 and 57.86% are from 18 to 60 years of age. Of the population, 5.79% have higher education and 56.1% have secondary education only. The number of refugees and IDPs from Nagorno-Karabakh conflict is 12,240 and 1,897, respectively.

== History ==
In the Middle Ages, Arab and Persian sources mentioned the city name as Şəmkür (Shamkur), Turkish sources varied from Şəmkür (Shamkur) to Şəmkir (Shamkir). In his book on the history of Azerbaijan published in 1924 while he was in Istanbul, Zeynaloğlu argued that name of the city was translated as Şəms (Sun) - Kür (Rayed).

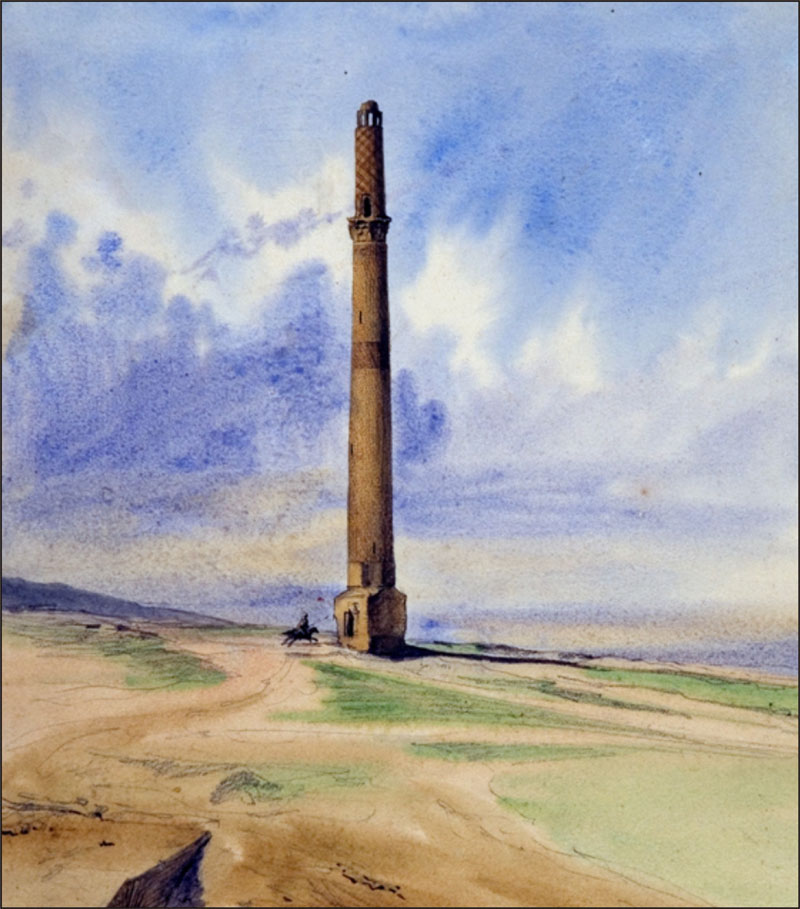
Minaret in Shamkir

Jahangirov explained otherwise referring to Şəm (Bank of) - Kür (Kür river), i.e. on the bank of the Kura River. The ruins of ancient Shamkir city which was in the form of a fortress and was 20 ha is located on the right bank of the Kura river. The city had two bridges over Kura. In the 7th century the city was occupied by the Arabian Caliphate and was named Mütəvəkkilliyə. It was renamed back to its original name later. The times of prosperity of Shamkir are attributed to 9th-12th centuries when it was conquered by Seljuqs. In the 12th century when Shamkir was a part of Atabek Empire, special attention was given to the city. In the 13th century Shamkir was one of the main points of resistance to Mongol invasion. In the 16th century, the leader of local Zülqədər (Zulgadar) tribe took the power. Later, Shamkir was part of Ganja khanate. In 1803, Shamkir was occupied by and annexed to the Russian Empire. During the Russo-Persian War of 1826-1828, Shamkir was one of the frontlines where Russian troops defeated the Persian army on September 3, 1826. In the first half of the 19th century, Russian Tsar relocated a large number of German colonists to Caucasus, placing a big community in Shamkir. From that time on until 1938, Shamkir was called Anino, after which it was renamed Shamkhor. It was renamed again to Shamkir in 1991.

== Architecture monuments ==
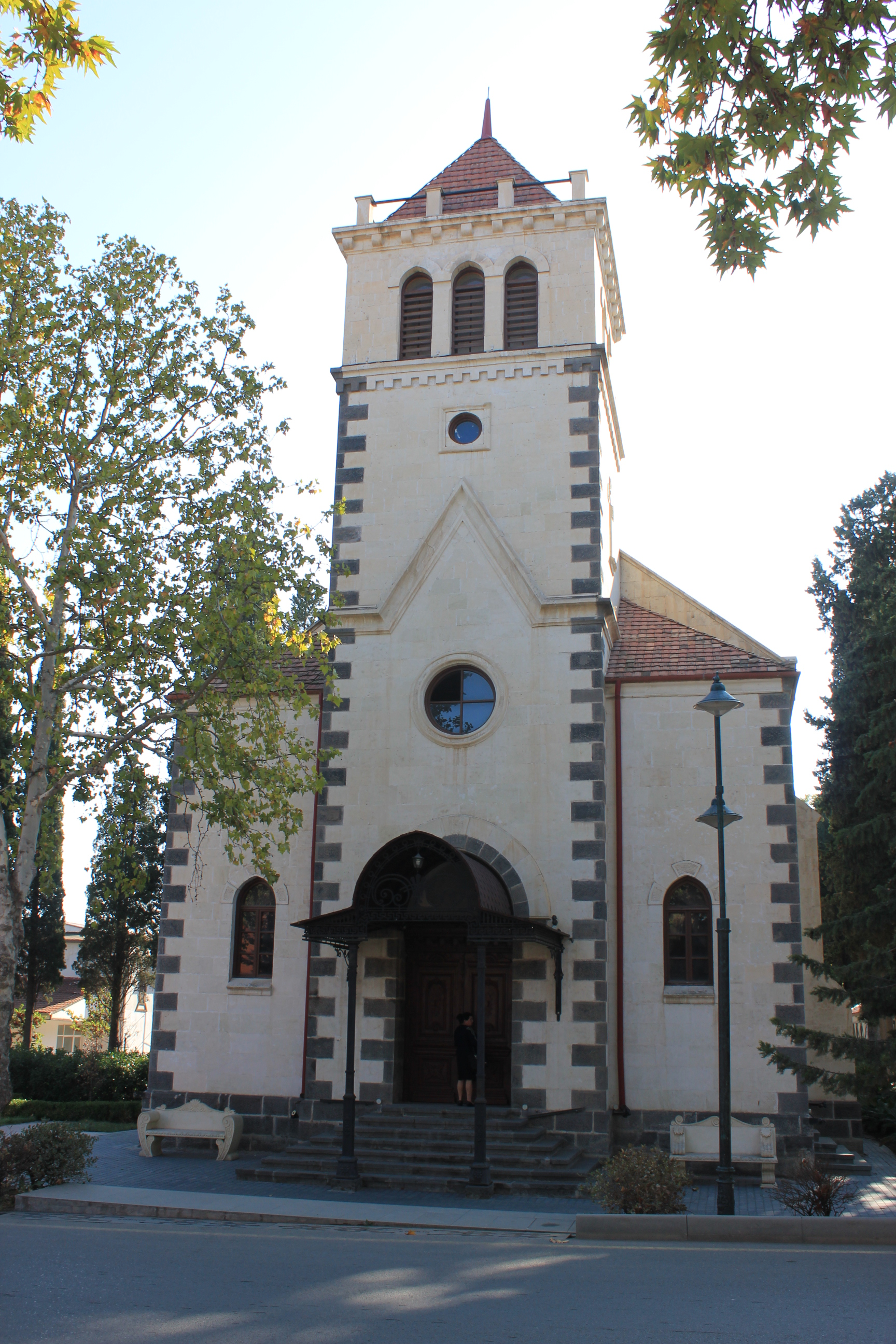
Deutsche Lutherische Kirche in Shamkir

Historic architectural monuments include 9th-12th century Shamkir city ruins, 9th-12th Shamkir bridge, 11th-12th century Shamkir fortress in Muxtariyyət village, Baydar city ruins in Bayramlı village, 9th-12th century Maiden Tower in Seyfali village, 16th-17th-century mosque in Abbaslı village, 11th century Maiden Tower in Tatarlı village, 16th-17th-century bridge in Tahnalı village, 16th-17th century Koroglu fortress in Şəmkir, Qalaboynu Fortress in Atabəy village, Pir monument from early Middle Ages pertaining to Caucasian Albania in Daşbulaq village, a church built in 1909 by German settlers in Şəmkir, 11th-12th century Oghuz cemetery in Yeni Seyfali village, 16th-18th-century bridge over Zəyəm River.

During archaeological excavations carried out by a joint Azerbaijani-German expedition since 2006, ruins of an ancient Achaemenid palace were discovered near Qaracəmirli.

Among the modern built monuments are the Victory Complex built in 1975 in Şəmkir city, mosque in Düyərli village, Victory Complex in Çinarlı settlement built in 1980, memorials to Black January in Sərxan and Naxırçılar neighborhoods of Şəmkir city unveiled in 1990, Ashig Huseyn Shamkirli monument unveiled in 1991, Ali-Agha Shikhlinski bust, mosque built in 1992 in Keçili village, a 1993 Koroglu monument in Muxtariyyə village, bust of Azerbaijani National Hero, Zaur Sarıyev, Alley of Martyrs to people who died from Armenian occupation. mosque built in 1998 in İrmaşlı village, Heydar Aliyev spring built in 1998, a Memorial to Azerbaijani Genocide of March 31, 1918 built in 2001, mosque built in Əliyaqublu village in 1998, Memorial to Azerbaijani Genocide victims in Qapanlı village, a 2001 monument to Yəhyabəy Dilqəm in Dəllər Cırdaxan village, monument to Ashig Alasgar, unveiled in 1997 in Çənlibel village.

== Government and economy ==
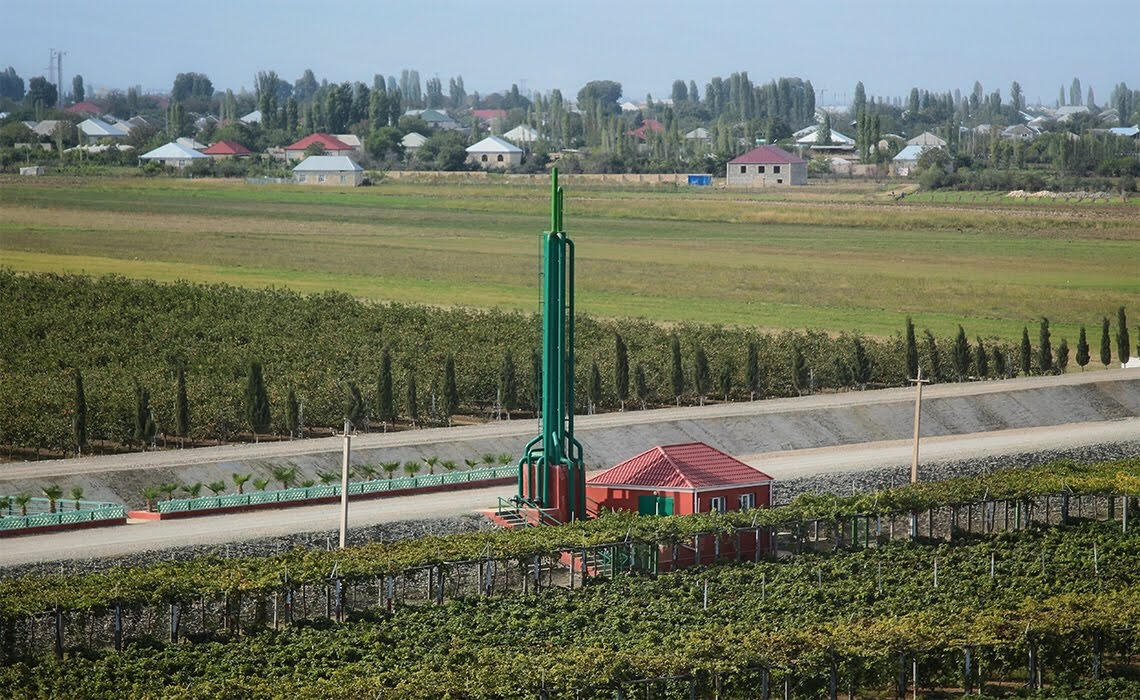
One of the vineyards in the Shamkir district

The Shamkir district is one of the largest agrarian districts of the Republic of Azerbaijan, covers 1660.00 km2, and the population is estimated at 213400 according to the official registration data in 2017. The major part of the employed population works in agriculture, industry, construction, trade, and public services. The basis of the economy Shamkir is dependent on agriculture. Poultry raising, cattlebreeding and silkworm breeding are major branches of agriculture. Agricultural machinery production, grape processing plants, construction plants constitute a big part of the economy. Wheat, barley, corn, grapes, onion, cabbage, tomato, cucumber, aubergine, sunflower, potato, viniculture, and livestock provide the main agricultural output. Electricity is received through power generation at Shamkir Hydroelectric Power Station on Shamkir reservoir which processes water from Kura River and also provides Shamkir and surrounding rayons with irrigation water. The new reservoir in the rayon will double that capacity and will come online in 2012. 2nd Shamkir Winery was established and operated in 1860-1896 by Christo Forer brothers and is active at the present. The total value of output in the economy of district during the first half of 2017 was around 219747 thousand AZN, and industrial products alone 22149 thousand AZN. During the first half of 2017, the volume of trade in goods amounted to 65,341 thousand AZN, and the volume of trade turnover increased by 17% compared to the same period of 2016 and amounted to 197030 thousand AZN. Total volume of gross product per person amounted to 315 AZN. “Sharg Ulduzu” Limited Liability Company owns a wine plant with 2000 tons of grape processing capacity, “Shamkir Poultry” farm producing 300,000 eggs per day, bread factory producing 55 tons of flour in a day, and “AzAqro” LLC which specialized in cultivation of Dutch cut rose varieties are the main industrial enterprises operating within the city. During the first period of 2017, through the National Fund for Entrepreneurship Support, 112,000 AZN state loans were issued to Shamkir region, creating 17 new jobs at the expense of these loans. According to statistics of 2017, 3149 jobs were created, of which 1984 were permanent and 1165 were temporary jobs. Shamkir Hydroelectric Power Station on Shamkir reservoir provides Shamkir and surrounding rayons with electricity and irrigation water. Municipality government was established in 1999. There are 57 municipalities in 64 populated settlements. One city, four settlements and 52 village municipalities function as regional governments The role of the municipalities expands as the renovation and city, village development, laying roads and development of social infrastructure continue.

=== Industry ===
The industry of Shamkir region includes food, electricity and production of construction materials. The 8 out of 13 industrial enterprises were small businesses in 2016. “Sharg Ulduzu” LLC which has a capacity of 2000 tons of grape processing capacity, processes 9 varieties of wine products and also produces cognac alcohol from wine products. In the Shamkir district “AzAqro” LLC, a greenhouse complex, grows over two million roses in a year over 2.5 hectares land. Currently, the portfolio is composed of 14 varieties: Red Naomi, Myrna, Peach Avalanche, Avalanche, Candy Avalanche, WoW, Hot bubble, Be-bubble, White bubble, Alegria, Pany Lane, Luxor, Jumilia and Sweet Dolomite. Shamkirchay hydroelectric power station has 25 Megawatt power capacity and built in order to meet local electricity and irrigation water demands.

	2010	2012	2013	2014	2015	2016
Number of operating enterprises total, unit	27	24	20	17	25	23
Industrial product (actual price of the relevant year), thousand AZN	44439	18171	17938	17969	25170	33687
Industrial product, relative to previous year, in percent (at comparable prices)	111,7	75,8	91,3	85,3	146,2	118,8
Share of non-public sector in industrial product, in percent	8,5	17,2	13,0	13,0	31,7	28,7
Remaining balance of finished goods for the year, thousand AZN	257,0	128,2	115,3	65,6	50,6	74,5
Average number of employees - total	948	891	1036	999	1093	1152
Average monthly salary of employees, AZN	276,4	296,0	307,5	337,3	506,4	399,3
Availability of the main industrial and production assets (at the end of the year with the balance sheet) million, AZN	171,8	155,3	156,9	160,8	1766	224,4
Production of basic types of products in natural expression:						
Wine, thousand dekaliter	3,2	5,2	4,5	-	1,1	-
Cognac, a thousand dekaliter	2,2	2,0	0,2	-	-	-
Electricity, million, kilowatt hour	1575,0	887,6	803,3	755,5	917,9	1057,0
Flour, ton	3602,0	4512,0	199,0	375,5	1470,0	6215,0
Soft drinks, min	0,9	-	-	-	27,0	-
Lean fish and other meat, tons	3,2	-	-	-	-	-
Limestone for construction, tons	19951	31352	29214	29063	19523	12174
Construction sand, thousand tons	22,3	19,7	24,6	9,7	7,0	10,7
Gravel, crushed stone, small river stone and flint stone, thousand tons	32,2	56,3	54,4	31,0	50,5	34,7
Structural structures of ferrous metals, thousand manats	-	-	-	-	3417	2522

==== Construction ====
	2010	2012	2013	2014	2015	2016
Putted into operation						
fixed assets, thousand manat	33069,8	42832,6	54488,8	40659,4	800322,3	109594,3
residential buildings, total area, thousand sq. m	57,9	60,5	61,0	62,8	58,1	39,3
individual houses from total buildings	57,2	57,8	58,4	62,8	58,1	38,4
Investments into fixed capital, thousand AZN	115023,4	269214,8	252545,2	162905,5	79297,7	96433,3
including:						
construction and installation works	92672,1	233808,8	215271,5	140881,8	71522,6	85604,7
Number of construction organizations, units	8	10	14	17	14	20
The number of employees working there	126	137	163	152	112	234
Cost of construction works with own capabilities, thousand AZN	4328,5	10760,6	11152,9	7882,2	5840,2	5299,4

=== Agriculture ===
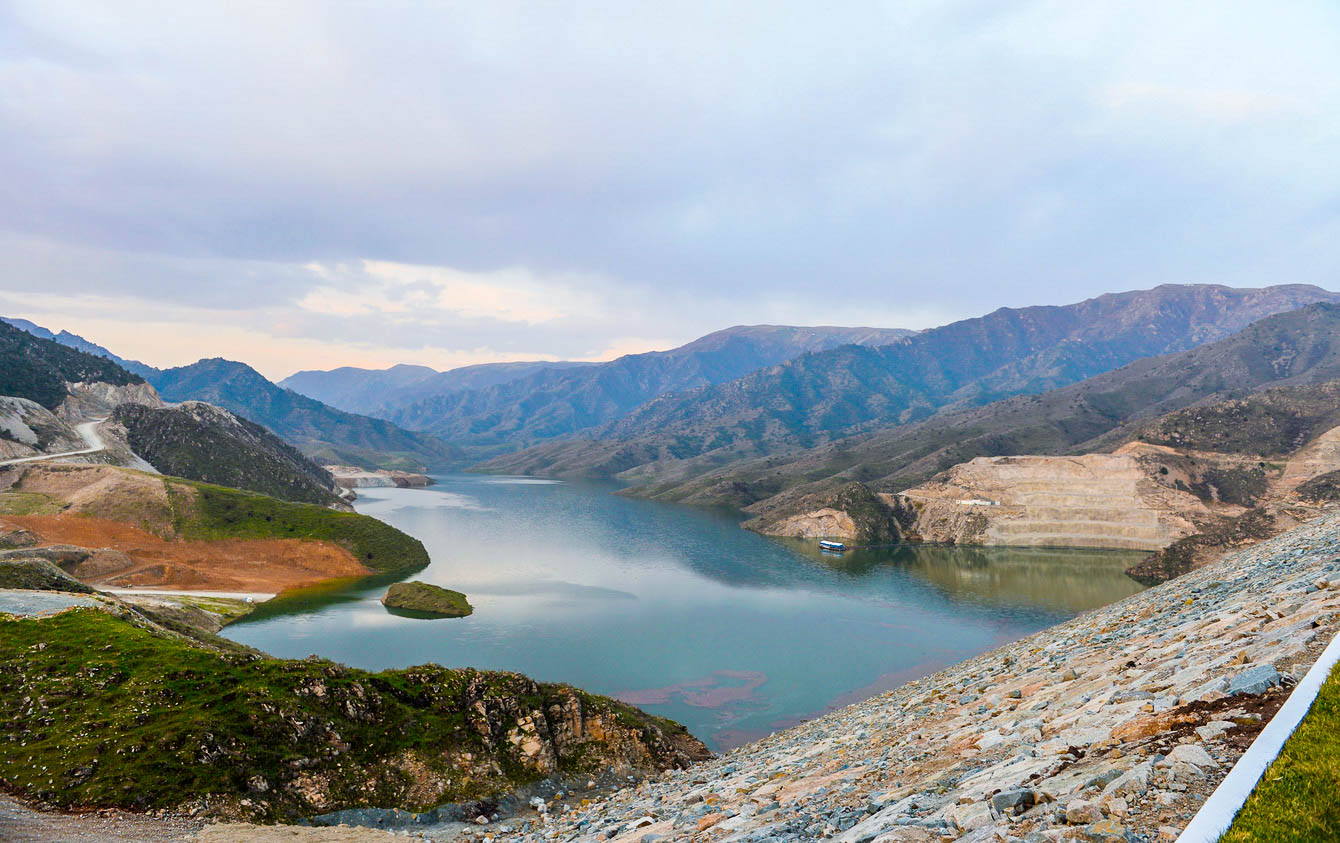
Shamkirchay Water Reservoir

Viticulture, grain growing, vegetable growing and livestock constitutes the basis of agriculture in Shamkir district.8. For the current year's harvest, in 14129 hectares of area grain were planted during autumn and spring in 2016. Its 8304 hectares were used to plant wheat, and 5777 hectares were for barley. High-quality vegetables such as tomatoes, cucumbers have been grown over the 906.7 ha greenhouse area in the district. There are total 5791 greenhouses which are heated by different sources: 285 natural gas, 637 of oil products, 2254 firewood and coal, 2811 are non-heated.

	2010	2012	2013	2014	2015	2016
Total area of sown agricultural crops (ha)
Cereals and cereal legumes	19357	19450	24575	20938	20621	21012
including wheat	12618	12643	16212	13178	10738	11757
Sugar beet	-	-	-	-	49	1046
Sunflower for seed production	414	590	592	917	872	968
Potato	6357	6391	6397	6406	6455	6497
Vegetables	6095	6152	6159	6164	6310	6317
viticulture	244	252	254	256	258	259
Fruit and berry	2940	2957	2968	2998	3123	3130
Grape	509	526	526	537	554	556
Production of main crops (in all categories of farms), tons
Cereals and cereal legumes	72012	80916	100685	70496	78927	74949
including wheat	45551	49903	64152	40110	37086	37819
Sugar beet	-	-	-	-	1470	32885
Sunflower for seed production	588	857	876	1536	1428	1660
Potato	106556	107572	108350	108447	109130	113655
Vegetables	118518	121928	121996	122082	127253	136769
viticulture	5615	5742	5673	5752	5806	5866
Fruit and berry	59877	59970	60203	60116	60160	60225
Grape	21855	21910	21956	21964	22155	22165
Productivity (in all categories of farming), centner / ha
Grain	37,2	41,6	41,0	33,7	38,3	35,1
including wheat	36,1	39,5	39,6	30,4	34,5	32,2
Sugar beet	-	-	-	-	300	348
Sunflower for seed production	15,0	14,9	14,8	16,8	17,0	17,0
Potato	168	168	169	169	169	175
Vegetables	185	189	190	190	194	210
viticulture	230	228	223	225	225	227
Fruit and berry	219,3	218,1	212,4	210,5	210,3	203,7
Grape	195,5	255,2	258,5	256,6	261,4	260,5
Number of livestock (in total)
cattle	59735	60583	60993	61053	61249	61358
including cows and buffaloes	28562	28904	29132	29190	29202	29295
Sheep and goats	278453	282170	285408	288375	290618	298585
Birds	518424	519447	923136	1021777	540200	531711
Bee Families, Unit	7974	7792	7912	8238	8301	8469
Production of animal products, ton
Meat	5050	5276	5383	5613	5928	6114
Milk	45027	47293	48769	51450	54608	56355
Eggs, thousand	41183	41421	101983	135740	73015	41510
Wool (in physical weight)	448	461	477	480	481	482

== Sport ==
As of 2014, the city is hosting Shamkir Chess tournament in honour of the memory of the chess grandmaster Vugar Gashimov.

== Notable natives ==
- Ahmad Javad, writer, poet, author of National Anthem of Azerbaijan
- Farman Salmanov, famous Azerbaijani and Soviet geologist
- Fazil Mammadov, former Minister of Taxes of Azerbaijan Republic
- Mubariz Gurbanli, deputy chief of Yeni Azerbaijan Party.
- Tajaddin Mehdiyev, former Minister of Defense of Azerbaijan
