= Azerbaijanis in Germany =

Total population
- 140,000-200,000 (census 2008)

Regions with significant populations
- Berlin, Cologne, Bremen, Hamburg, Mainz, Frankfurt am Main, Munich, Düsseldorf, Stuttgart

Languages
- Azerbaijani, German, Persian, Russian, Turkish,

Religion
- Shia Islam

Related ethnic groups
- turks in Germany

Currently, there are more than 200,000 Azerbaijanis in Germany (Azerbaijani: Almaniya azərbaycanlıları; German: Aserbaidschaner in Deutschland). About 17,000 of them live in the capital city of Berlin. The majority of Azerbaijanis work in the field of service and construction. The minority of Azerbaijanis are involved in state structures, universities and hospitals. There are no compact settlements of Azerbaijanis in Germany.

The majority of Azerbaijanis, who settled in Germany, moved from Turkey, Iran and Azerbaijan.

== Azerbaijani volunteers ==
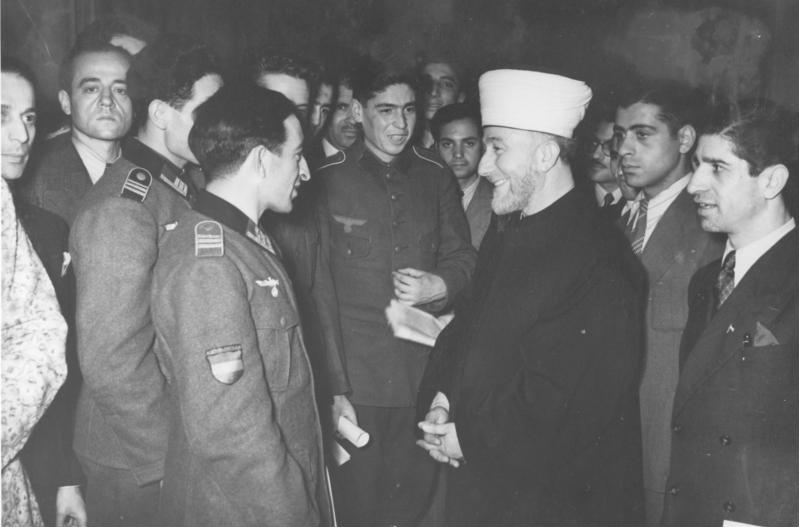
Azerbaijani legionnaires chatting with the Grand Mufti of Jerusalem, Haj Amin al-Husseini, on 19 December 1942, Haus der Flieger, Berlin

National Committee of Azerbaijan was created in Berlin by Azerbaijani political immigrants in 1941. Aserbaidschanische Legion was formed in 1942 mainly of former Azerbaijani POW volunteers but also volunteers from other peoples in the area. Many Azerbaijanis joined here in hopes of liberating their homeland (which they often used to mean 'class') from Soviet rule. One Azerbaijani soldier who was captured said to the Germans he was anti-Bolshevik and only wanted an opportunity to free his homeland. According to Argumenty i Fakty newspaper, 40,000 Azerbaijani nationals fought for Third Reich.

== History of settlement ==
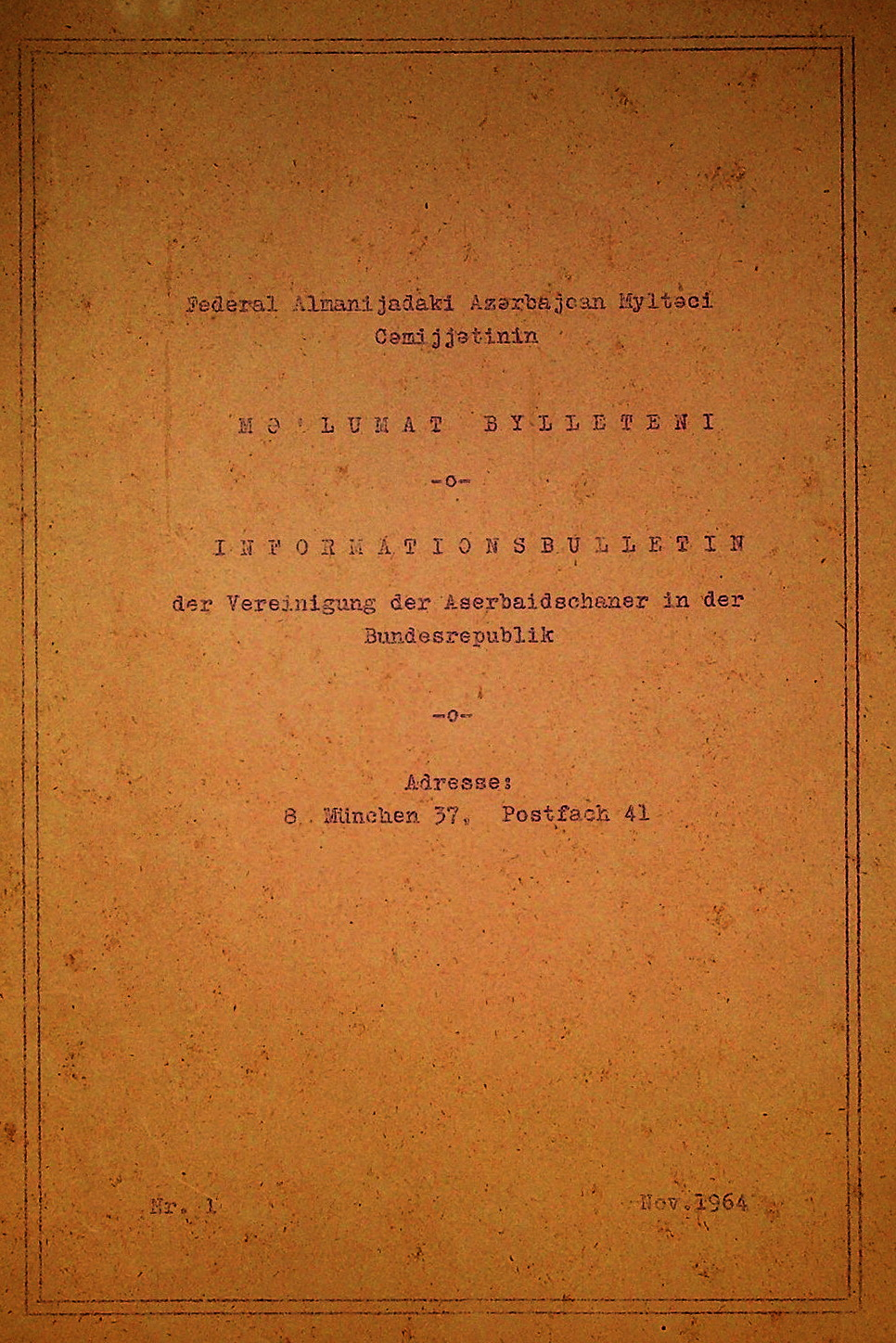
Information Bulletin of the Association of Azerbaijanis in the Federal Republic of Germany (No. 1, 1964)

The first wave of Azerbaijanis appeared in Germany in the 1960s of the twentieth century. The mass flow of Azerbaijanis to Germany occurred in the early 1990s of the twentieth century. The main reasons for this flow were the Nagorno-Karabakh conflict, the increase in the number of refugees, as well as the economic crisis.

In 2015, the expert on migration issues Azer Allahveranov said that hundreds of Azerbaijanis anticipate a deportation from European countries according to the readmission agreement. This agreement was signed by the Azerbaijani government with the EU in September 2014. In winter of 2014, such an agreement was signed with the Kingdom of Norway.

In April 2018, Azerbaijanis living in Germany held a two-hour action of solidarity in front of the Azerbaijani embassy in the capital city of Berlin. The organization of the action was supported by the Azerbaijan House in the city of Berlin, as well as the Congress of European Azerbaijanis, the German-Azerbaijani Cultural Center, the Magdeburg Society of Culture Azerbaijan-Germany. Approximately 200 Azerbaijanis participated. Chairman of the Congress of Azerbaijanis of Europe – Sahil Gasimov, deputy president of the Congress of Azerbaijanis of Benelux – Elsever Mamedov, chairman of the German-Azerbaijani society in Bonn – Naiba Hajiyeva, head of the Cultural Center Germany-Azerbaijan – Faig Mammadov, president of the Association of Azerbaijanis of Finland – Vasif Muradly, Chairman of the Society of Azerbaijani Women – Arzu Oqtay and others.

== Current Azerbaijani societies in Germany ==
The Azerbaijani diaspora in Germany is considered as one of the largest representative offices of the Azerbaijani diaspora in Europe. In 1988, the "Azerbaijan-German Society" was founded in the city of Berlin. Earlier, in 1986, an organization named the "Azerbaijan-German Academy" was established.

=== Berlin ===
The following Azerbaijani societies operate in Berlin: the German-Azerbaijani Cultural Society (German Deutsch-Aserbaidschanischer Kulturverein) (Chairman Ibrahim Ahrari), the Society of Azerbaijani Academicians (Vereinigung der aserbaidschanischen Akademiker) (Chairman Ahmed Yazdani), Nizami Gandjavi (German Kulturinstitut Nizami Gandschavi) (chairman: Dr. Nurida Ateshi), Verein der deutsch-aserbaidschanischen Freundschaft (chairman Mansour Rashidi), Society "Verne Odlar Yurdu" (German: Verein Odlar Yurdu), Azerbaijan Odlar Yurdu – Country of Lights) (Chairman Jafar Jafarzadeh)

=== Cologne ===
The following Azerbaijani societies function in Cologne: the Society for Azerbaijani Culture (German Aserbaidschanischer Kulturverein) (Chairman Chalice Tazel was appointed in 1990), the Society for Friendship of Azerbaijan and Germany (German Verein der deutsch-aserbaidschanischen Freundschaft) (Chairman Ufug).

=== Stuttgart ===
There is the Society of Azerbaijan Culture (German Aserbaidschanischer Kulturverein) (chairman Jumali Turan) in Stuttgart.

=== Bochum ===
There is the Academic Azerbaijan Society (German Aserbaidschanische Akademikerverein) (chairman Mardan Agayev) In Bochum.

=== Nuremberg ===
There is the Society for Friendship and Culture between Azerbaijan and Germany (German Aserbaidschanisch-Deutscher Freundschaft und Kulturverein) (chairman Asad Rahimov) in Nuremberg. Circle of Azerbaijani Culture "(1990)

=== Würzburg ===
There is the Cultural Azerbaijani Society "Güney" (German Aserbaidschanischer Kulturverein "Güney") (Chairman Gulamhuseyn Shahmari) In Würzburg.

There are also the "Center of Azerbaijani Culture" in Bonn, the "Azerbaijan-German Society" (1991) in Düsseldorf, the "Azerbaijan Society for Cultural Relations" in Frankfurt, the "Azerbaijan House" (1997) in Limburg an der Lahn and other organizations functioning in Germany. In 1996, all the Azerbaijani communities in Germany were united in a single organization – the Federation of German-Azerbaijani Societies (FGAO). The Federation was established in the city of Mainz and included 8 organizations. The main goal of the federation is to strengthen external relations between the organizations of the Diaspora. The president of the federation is Nusret Delbest.

On 21–22 August, in 1999, the first congress of FGAO was held in Bonn. Since October 2004, the Institute of Culture named in honor of Nizami Ganjavi has started functioning in Berlin. Simultaneously, courses on studying German and Azerbaijani languages, teaching courses in the field of music and computer knowledge were opened. Members of the Federation celebrate the national holidays of Germany and Azerbaijan.

Since 2011, in Dresden every 15 June, the society "Alm.az" holds an event in honor of the Day of National Salvation. The chair of the society is Agahuseyn Babayev.

Nowadays, there are approximately 35–40 Azerbaijani organizations on the territory of Germany.

The Azerbaijani people who live in Germany now have an opportunity to visit the city of Baku for a week, becoming a participant in the so-called project "My Motherland – Azerbaijan". The project itself was organized as a result of the activities of the State Committee for Work with the Diaspora and the Germany-Azerbaijan Friendship Society.

In 2014 a meeting was held between the delegation of the State Committee of Azerbaijan for Work with the Diaspora and the heads of Azerbaijani Diaspora organizations in the city of Frankfurt. The meeting was attended by the chairmen and activists of the organizations – Samira Pater-Ismayilova, Etibar Ganiyev, Bashar Komur, Agahuseyn Babayev, Tarana Taghiyeva, Tofiq Garaev, Elnur Richter, and others.

A report of the plans which were implemented in 2014 was introduced to participants of the meeting. The existing problems in the field of ensuring the participation of Azerbaijanis, who live in Europe, in social and political life, were discussed.

== Culture ==
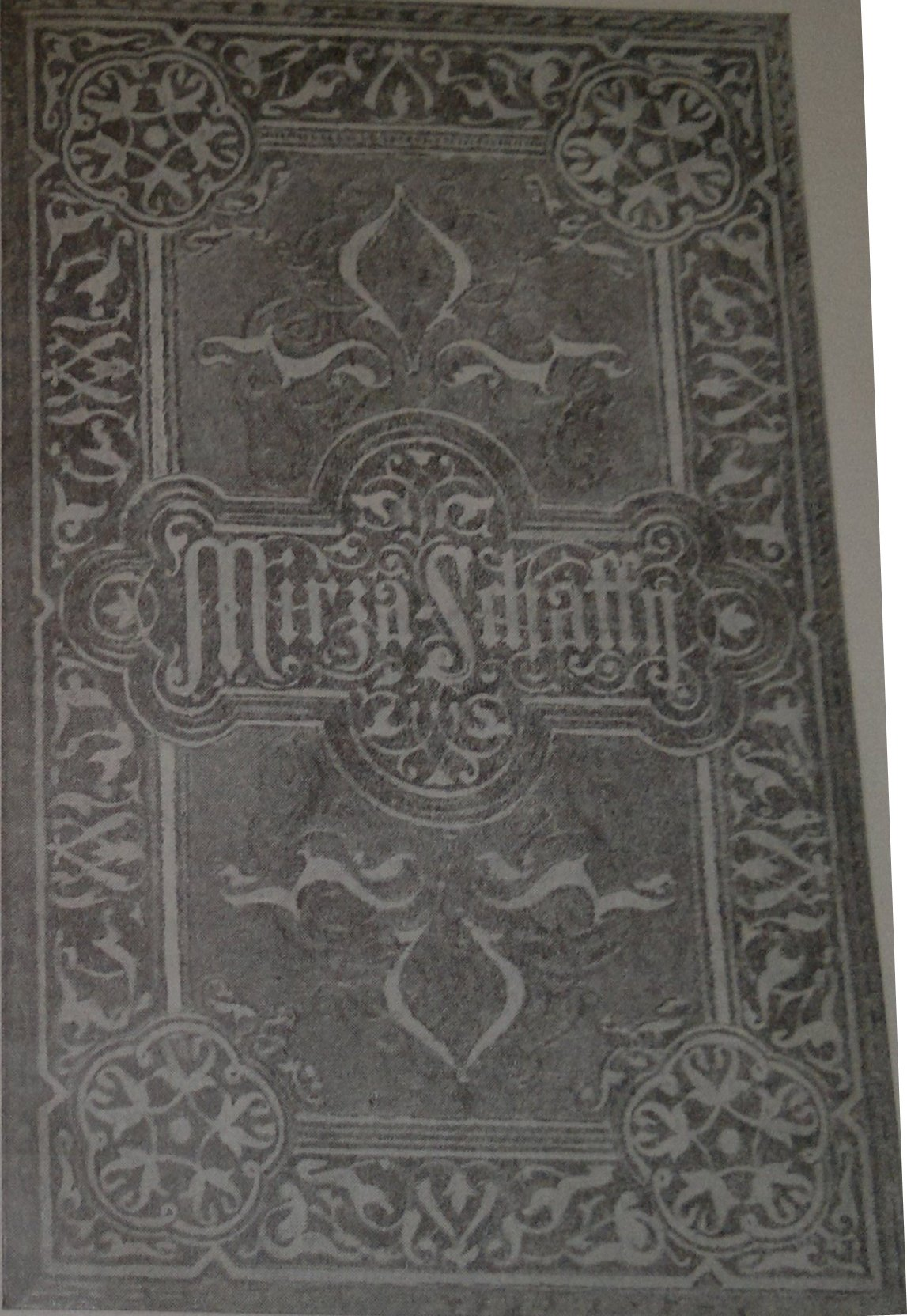
Poems of Mirza Shafi Vazeh

Friedrich Martin von Bodenstedt, a German poet and traveler translated Mirza Shafi Vazeh's poetry into German, upon his return from Caucasia to Germany. His first book about Shafi was entitled Thousand and One Days in the Orient. This contained an account of Bodenstedt's sojourn in Asia and included many of Shafi's poems. His publisher asked him to issue separately the poems contained in it and as a result these were published in 1851 as a book named Die Lieder des Mirza Schaffy (The Songs of Mirza Shafi), which contained many additional poems.

The Khojaly Massacre Memorial in Berlin is the first public memorial in Germany dedicated to victims of the Khojaly Massacre. The monument is near Gottfried Benn Library in Steglitz-Zehlendorf. The memorial was unveiled on 30 May 2011, while the opening ceremony was attended by Norbert Kopp, Mayor of Steglitz-Zehlendorf; Adalat Valiyev, Azerbaijani Deputy Minister of Culture and Tourism; expatriate Azerbaijanis and leading scientific and cultural figures from both countries.

Cultural night was organized at Berlin History Museum in September 2011 on the occasion of 20th anniversary of the independence of the Republic of Azerbaijan, besides cultural evenings were held in Munich, Shtutgart, Cologne, Hamburg in 2013, in Hanover, Düsseldorf, Dresden in 2014, in Frankfurt in 2015 organized by Heydar Aliyev Foundation with support of Azerbaijani Embassy in Germany.

Meydan TV, a Berlin-based Azerbaijani non-profit media organization was founded by Emin Milli in 2013.

== Notable people ==
- Abdurrahman Fatalibeyli – Soviet army major who defected to the German forces during World War II; chief of the Azerbaijani desk of Radio Liberty in Munich
- Dimitrij Nazarov – Azerbaijani footballer who plays for Erzgebirge Aue in the 2. Bundesliga
- Emin Milli – writer, human rights activist, and dissident living in exile
- Franghiz Ali-Zadeh – Azerbaijani composer and pianist
- Igor Lukanin – ice dancer, competes internationally for Azerbaijan
- Ilham Mammadov – Azerbaijani footballer
- Vugar Aslanov – writer and journalist

=== Iranian origin ===
- Ali Samadi Ahadi – Iranian-German filmmaker and scriptwriter
- Akbar Behkalam – painter and sculptor
- Aziz Asli – Iranian retired football goalkeeper, manager and actor
- Kazem Sadegh-Zadeh – analytic philosopher of medicine
- Kiyan Soltanpour – an Azerbaijani-Iranian footballer who plays for Berliner SC in the Berlin-Liga
- Misha Bolourie – poet and painter
- Rahim Rahmanzadeh – surgeon and physician
- Razie Golami Shabani – politician and activist.
- Shahla Aghapour – Iranian artist, author and gallery director

=== Turkish origin ===
- Sinan Şamil Sam – Turkish-Azeri heavyweight professional boxer

== See also ==
- Caucasus Germans
- Azerbaijan–Germany relations
- Azerbaijan in the Eurovision Song Contest 2011
- Iranians in Germany
- Turks in Germany
- Russians in Germany
