= Azerbaijan–Germany relations =

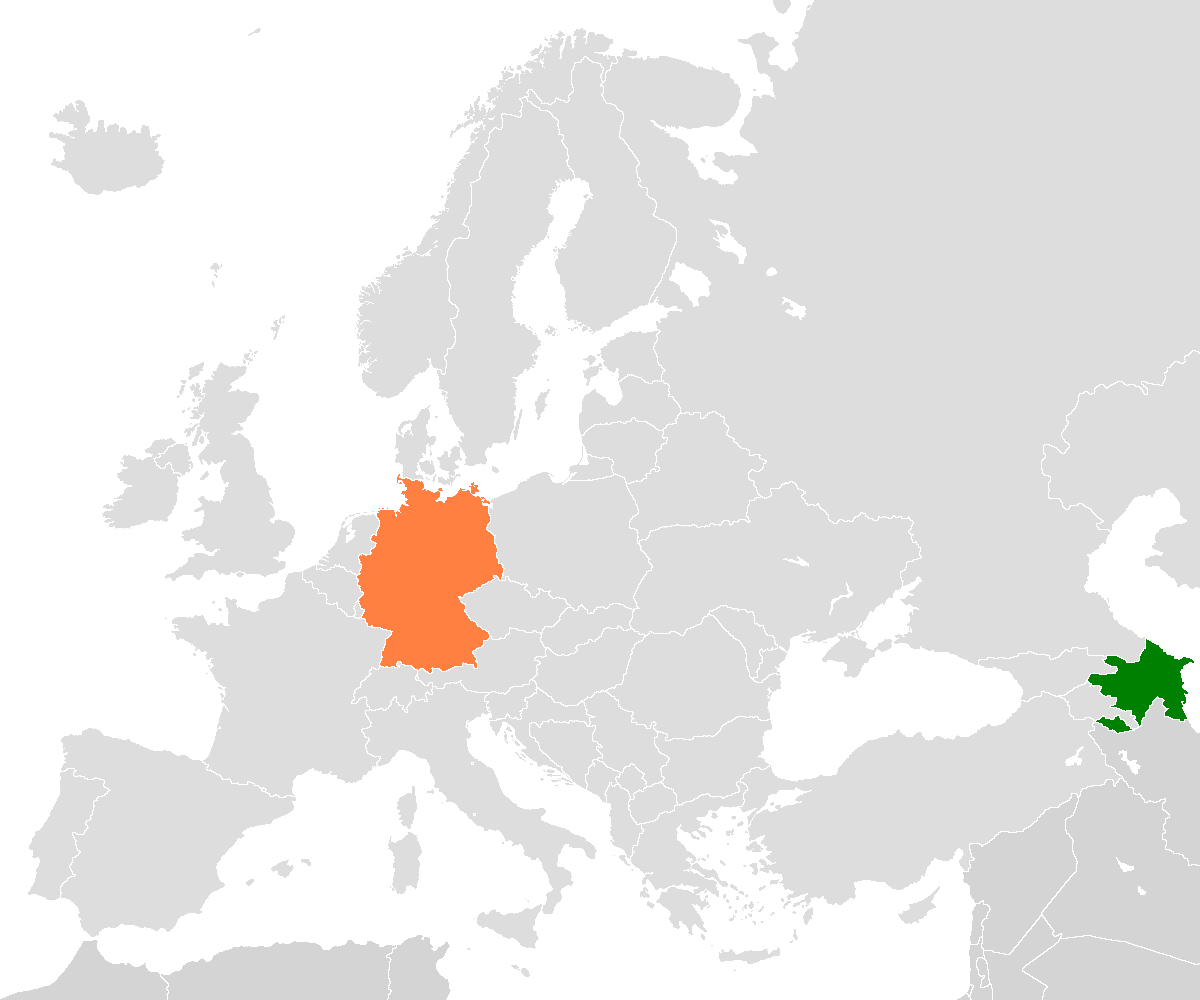

- Azerbaijan: Germany

Diplomatic mission
- Embassy of Azerbaijan, Berlin: Embassy of Germany, Baku

The diplomatic relations between Azerbaijan and Germany were established in 1992 after Germany recognized the independence of Azerbaijan.

== History ==
=== Germans in Azerbaijan ===
The beginning of mutual relations dates back to the 19th century. German company “Siemens Brothers” built copper smelting plants in Gadabay, and a cobalt plant in Dashkesan. As the result of the construction of these plants, the activity of German industrialist grew in Azerbaijan and German colonies emerged in surrounding areas, especially in Goygol (Helenendorf) and Shamkir (Annenfeld).

Six of the first German colonies were established in Georgia. However, as there was insufficient suitable state land in the vicinity of Tbilisi to accommodate all of the immigrants, some German families were relocated to the Elizavetpol (Ganja) region. In his correspondence, General Aleksey Yermolov noted that the region contained extensive state-owned land suitable for the settlement of colonists. Following this decision, a number of German families were settled in the region in the spring of 1819, leading to the establishment of the colonies of Helenendorf and Annenfeld. A total of 127 German families (approximately 600 people) settled in Helenendorf, while 67 families (approximately 300–400 people) settled in Annenfeld. By the beginning of the 20th century, there were eight German colonies in Azerbaijan. These were Helenendorf, Annenfeld, Georgsfeld, Alexeevka, Grünfeld, Eigenfeld, Traubenfeld, and Elizavetinka. These colonies were located in the Khanlar (present-day Goygol), Shamkir, Gazakh, Tovuz, and Aghstafa districts. The German population of Azerbaijan reached 23133 until 1939 living in 8 colonies. In 1941, Soviet authorities deported German population of Azerbaijan to Kazakhstan and Siberia.

=== Diplomatic relations ===
Germany recognized the independence of Azerbaijan on January 12, 1992. Diplomatic relations between Azerbaijan and Germany established on February 20, 1992. Azerbaijan opened its first embassy in Western Europe, in Germany on September 2, 1992, and Embassy of Germany to Azerbaijan was opened on September 22, 1992. Ramin Hasanov was accredited as the ambassador of Azerbaijan to Germany in September 2016. Michael Kindsgrab is the ambassador of Germany in Azerbaijan since August 2016.

In November 2023, Azerbaijan summoned the German ambassador to protest at what it said were "illegal financial operations" to support independent online outlet Abzas Media, three of whose staff were arrested the week before.

== Legal base of bilateral relations ==
Several documents signed between the two countries: the Agreement on Financial Cooperation (April, 1995); Agreement on Air Transport (July 1995); Agreement on Cultural Cooperation (December 1995); Agreement on abrogation of double taxation in respect to income and property taxes (August 2004); Agreement on military cooperation between the Ministry of Defense of Azerbaijan and the Federal Ministry of Defense of Germany; Joint Declaration on Legal Cooperation between the Ministry of Justice of Azerbaijan and the Federal Ministry of Justice of Germany; Memorandum of Understanding on the establishment of a high-level Working Group on Trade and Investment between the Ministry of Economic Development of Azerbaijan and the Federal Ministry of Economy and Technology of Germany (May 2011); Agreement between the Government of the Federal Republic of Germany and the Government of the Republic of Azerbaijan on the establishment of the German-Azerbaijani Foreign Trade Chamber in Baku (March 2012).

== High level visits ==
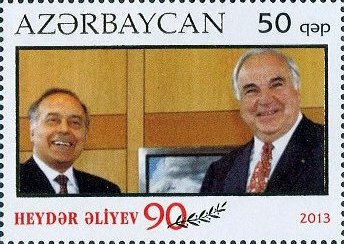
Heydar Aliyev met with Helmut Kohl

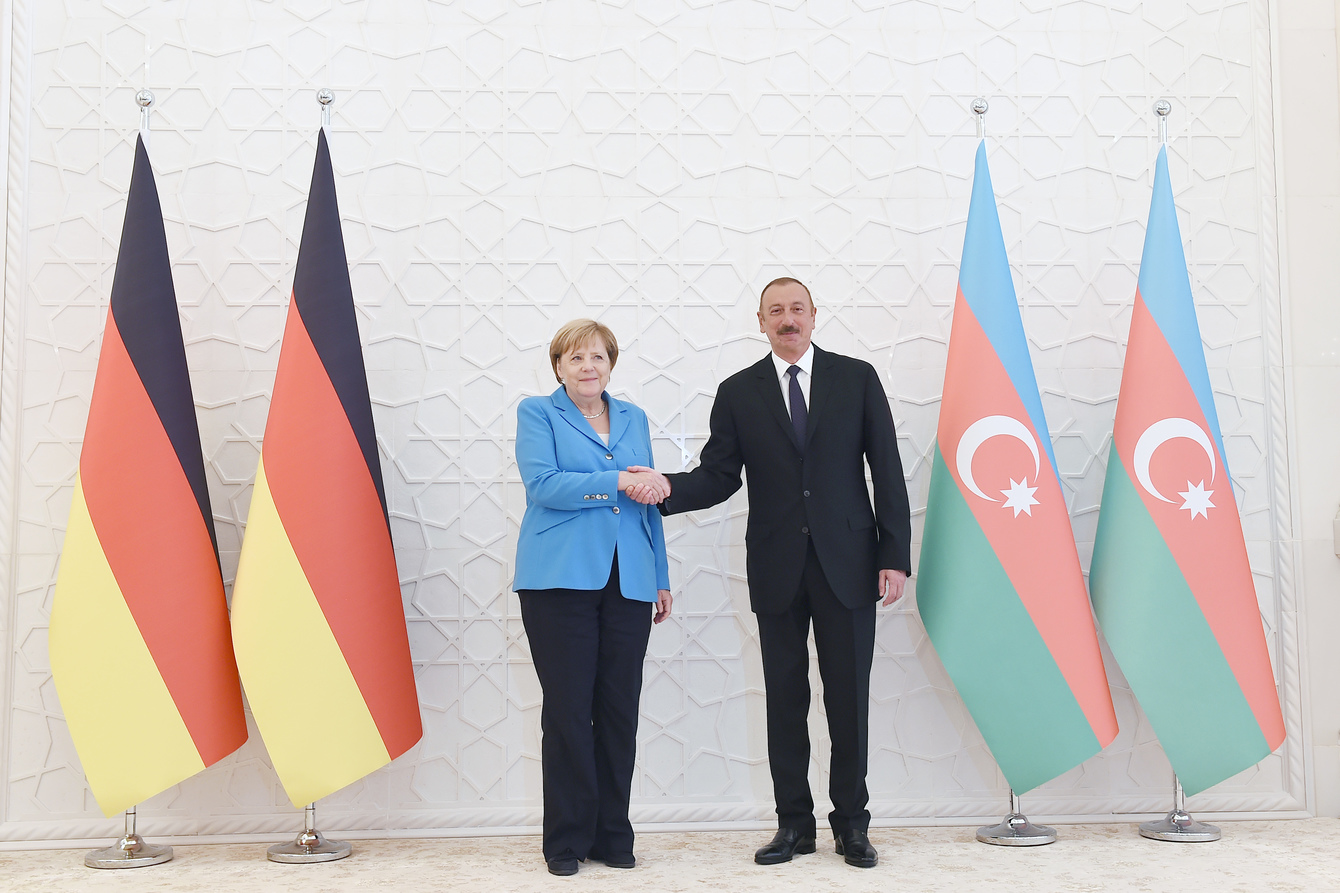
German chancellor Angela Merkel meet with Azerbaijani President Ilham Aliyev in Baku, 10 August 2018

Visits from Azerbaijan to Germany

- President Heydar Aliyev (1996)
- President Ilham Aliyev (2004, 2006, 2007, 2009, 2010, 2012, 2015, 2016. 2023, 2024)
- Minister of Foreign Affairs Elmar Mammadyarov (2006, 2008, 2010, 2011, 2012, 2013, 2014 and 2016)
- Deputy Minister of Foreign Affairs Araz Azimov (22–23 February 2016)

Visits from Germany to Azerbaijan

- President Frank-Walter Steinmeier (2007, 2014 and 2016)
- Chancellor Angela Merkel (2018)
- Minister of Foreign Affairs Guido Westerwelle (2012)
- Minister of Foreign Affairs Klaus Kinkel (1995)
- Minister of Foreign Affairs Joseph Fischer (2001, 2004)

== Inter-parliamentary relations ==
The inter-parliamentary cooperation between the two countries is carried out by the Working Group on Azerbaijan-Germany inter-parliamentary relations from Azerbaijan, and the German-South Caucasus Parliamentary Group from Germany. Milli Majlis established the Working Group on Azerbaijan-Germany inter-parliamentary relations on 7 March 1997. According to the decision of Milli Majlis dated 4 March 2016, the head of the Working Group on Azerbaijan-Germany inter-parliamentary relations is Rovshan Rzayev.

== Consular relations ==
The Consular Section of the Embassy of Azerbaijan to Germany carries out the consular service of Azerbaijan in Germany.

Honorary Consulate of the Republic of Azerbaijan in Germany is located in Stuttgart, and the Honorary Consul of Azerbaijan is Otto Hauser.

== Cultural relations ==
The foundations of cultural relations between Azerbaijan and Germany date back to the 19th century. The settlement of Germans in Azerbaijan in the early 19th century contributed to the development of cultural interaction between the two communities. Following the restoration of Azerbaijan’s independence, cultural relations entered a new phase. The main legal framework for cooperation in this field was established through the Azerbaijan–Germany Agreement on Cultural Cooperation, signed on 22 December 1995. Cultural relations between the two countries continue through various exhibitions, artistic activities, and cultural events.

In 2007 the Berlin-Baku gallery was opened in Berlin as a partner of the Maiden Tower Gallery in Baku. “Year of Azerbaijan” was held in Germany in 2008, and German Culture Weeks were organized in Azerbaijan in 2009. The German church located in the area of former Helenendorf was restored in 2008 with the support of the Federal Government.

Cultural night was organized at Berlin History Museum in September 2011 on the occasion of 20th anniversary of the independence of the Republic of Azerbaijan, besides cultural evenings were held in Munich, Stuttgart, Cologne, Hamburg in 2013, in Hanover, Düsseldorf, Dresden in 2014, in Frankfurt in 2015 organized by Heydar Aliyev Foundation with support of Azerbaijani Embassy in Germany.

German Embassy in Azerbaijan organized the first German teachers’ day in Azerbaijan, Shaki city in March 2017. A concert dedicated to the 25th anniversary of diplomatic relations between Azerbaijan and Germany was organized in Berlin on December 1, 2017.

== Economic relations ==
According to the statistics, bilateral merchandise trade between Azerbaijan and Germany totaled 1.914 million USD in 2015. Import volume of Azerbaijan was 690,08 million USD, and export was 1.224 million USD in 2015. In 2015, the share of Germany was 9.27% in the foreign trade turnover of Azerbaijan, including 7.48% in imports and 10.71% in exports.

Germany-Azerbaijan High-level Working Group on Trade and Investment was established on May 5, 2011. Head of the Office of the Ministry of Economy of Azerbaijan Samir Valiyev and Director General for Foreign Economic Policy of the Ministry of Economy and Technology of Germany Eckhard Franz are the Co-chairs of the Group. The Group organized meetings in 2011 and 2015 in Berlin, in 2013 and 2014 in Baku. The 7th meeting was held in Berlin on November 22, 2017.

German-Azerbaijani Foreign Trade Chamber was opened in Baku on November 12, 2012. The Chamber has more than 13 member-organizations from the two countries. Representations of some of the Azerbaijani companies are operating in Germany, as SOCAR Germany and AZAL in Frankfurt and Berlin, IBA in Frankfurt.

According to the German Federal Ministry for Economic Affairs and Energy, Azerbaijan accounted for approximately 65% of the total trade volume between Germany and the South Caucasus in 2020. In the same year, Azerbaijan became Germany’s ninth-largest supplier of crude oil, exporting approximately 2.5 million tons of crude oil to Germany. High-level bilateral visits and promotional events held in Germany under the “Made in Azerbaijan” brand contributed to the development of economic and trade relations between the two countries.

Trade turnover between Azerbaijan and Germany (in thousand USD)
Year	Import	Export	Trade turnover
2012	779 971	964 767	1.744.738
2013	823 024	356 735	2.179.759
2014	703 636	1.925.563	2.629.200
2015	689 996	1.223.961	1.913.958
2016	399 192	610 831	1.010.023
2017	352 238	1 002 868	1 355 106
2018	433.709	1.875.803	1.008.385
2019	439.634	1.348.284	1.787.918
2020	358.775	734.051	1.092.826
2021	634.4	650.26	1. 284.66
2022	663.6	591.3	1.254.9
2023	916.42	907.92	1824.34
Extracted from mfa.gov.az

== Resident diplomatic missions ==
- Azerbaijan has an embassy in Berlin.
- Germany has an embassy in Baku.
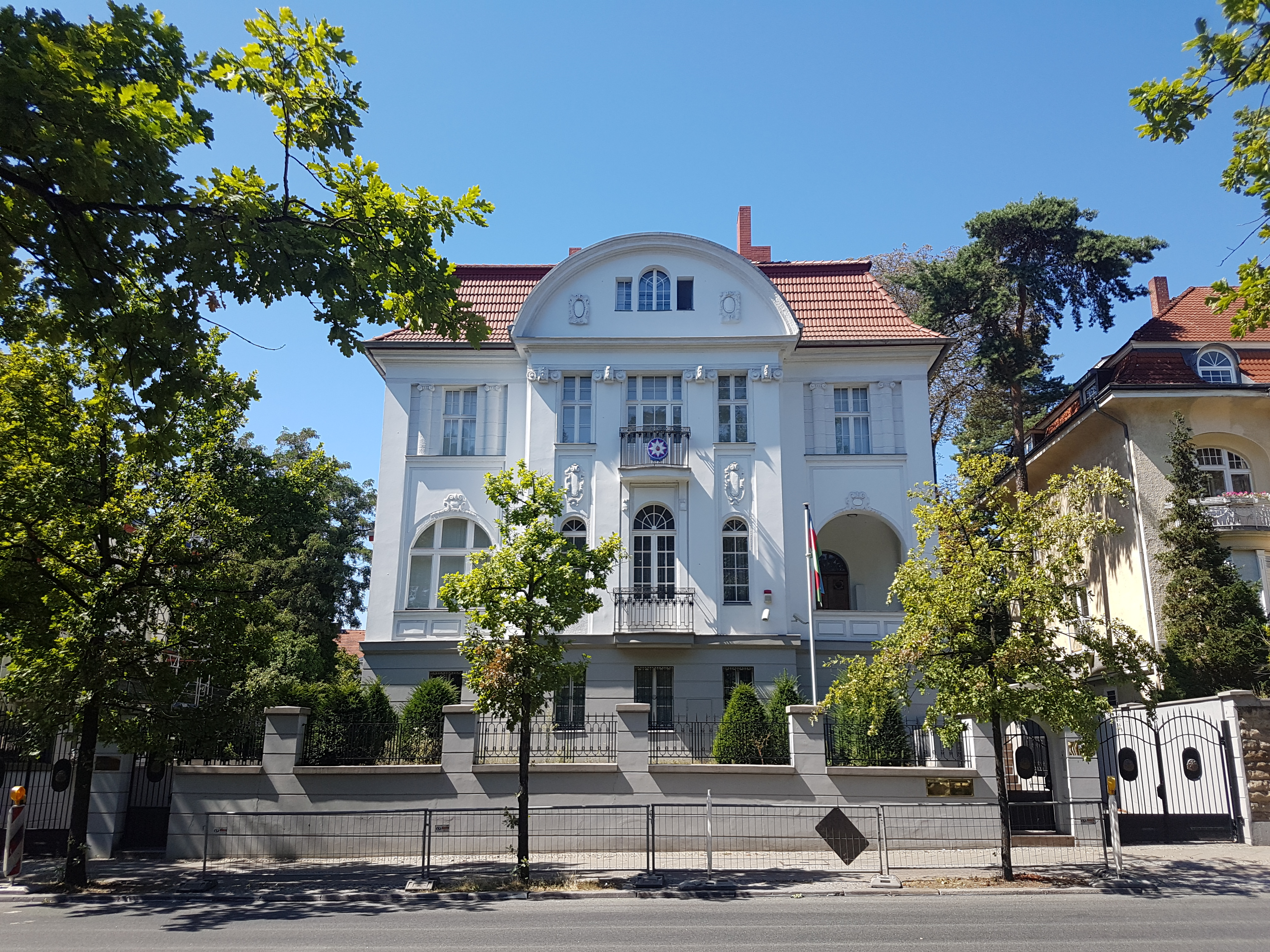
Embassy of Azerbaijan in Berlin

== See also ==
- Foreign relations of Azerbaijan
- Foreign relations of Germany
- Azerbaijanis in Germany
- Azerbaijanis in Europe
- Germans in Azerbaijan
- Caucasus Germans
- Church of the Saviour, Baku
- St. John's Church, Goygol
- Azerbaijan–European Union relations
