= House-Museum of Victor Klein =

Museum in Azerbaijan

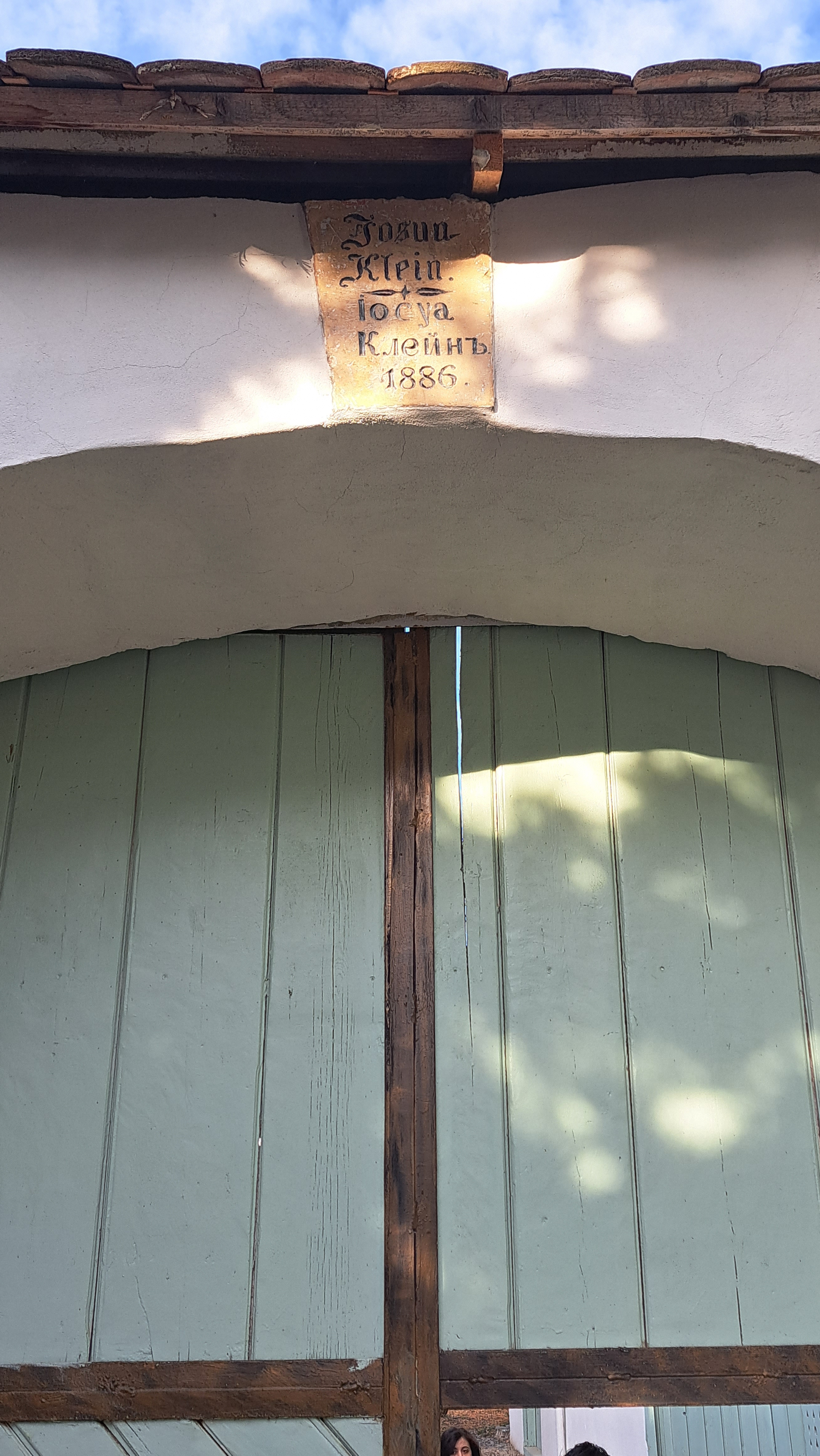
- Coordinates: 40.588142°N 46.318068°E

House-Museum of Victor Klein is a house-museum from the early 19th century. It was the house of Victor Klein, the last German who lived in Goygol.

== About ==
Victor Klein was born on September 1, 1935, in Goygol. He was a radio technician. He was not married. The house where he lived was built in 1886 by Victor Klein's grandfather Joshua Klein. When the Germans were deported from the territory of the USSR in 1941, they did not deport mixed families. Victor Klein's father was Polish, so he and his mother were not deported. Before his death, Viktor Klein bequeathed the house he lived in to the German embassy in Azerbaijan. On March 29, 2007, he died in Goygol. He was buried in the German cemetery in Goygol.

The house where he lived was renovated as a museum to keep the memory of the Germans.
