= Razieh =

Razieh is a given name. Notable people with the surname include:

- Razieh Gholami-Shabani (1925–2013), Azerbaijani politician and activist
- Razieh Shirmohammadi (1976/1977–2019), Iranian Paralympic archer
