= Vohrer's house =

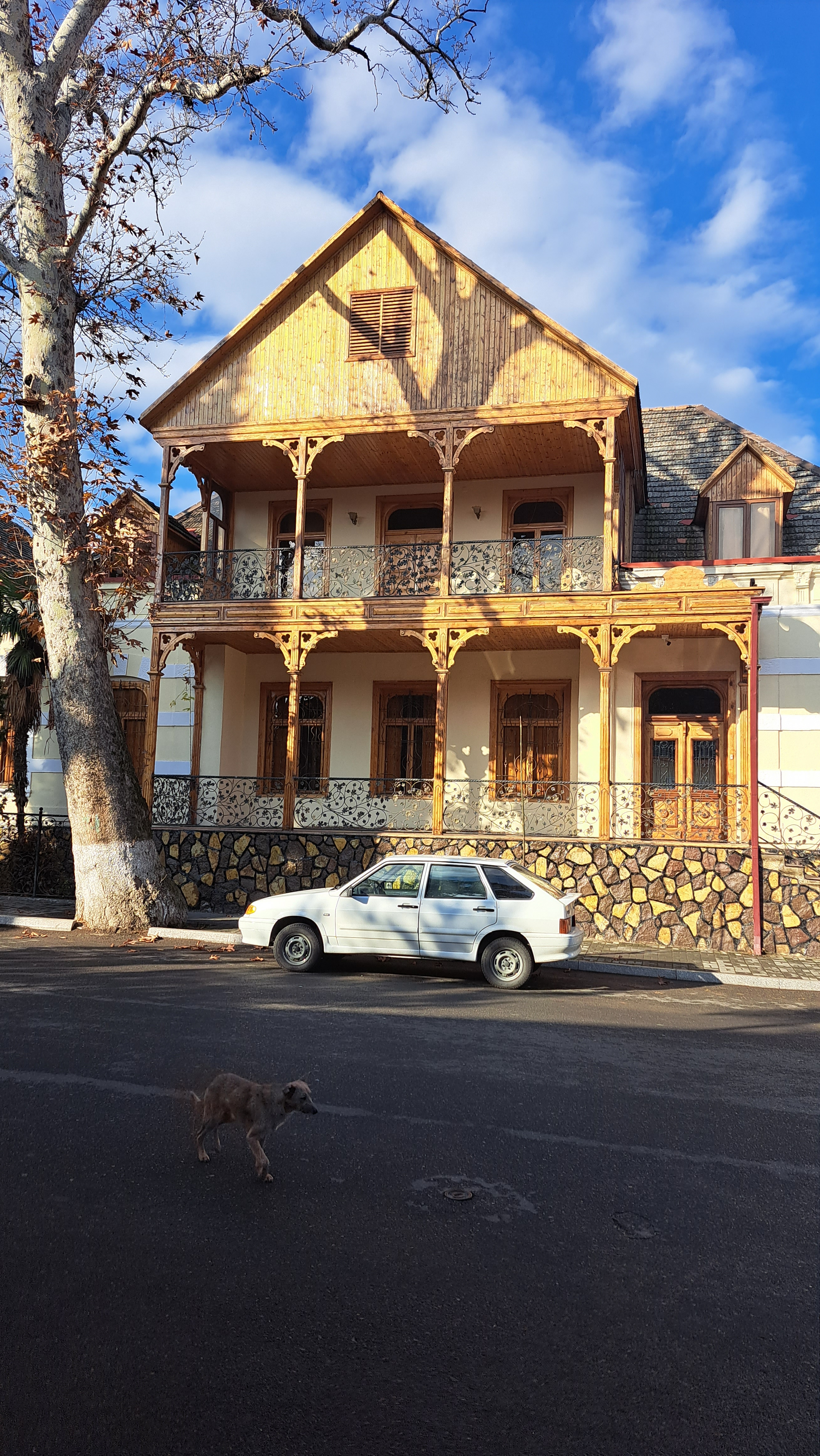

Vohrer's house is an architectural structure in the city of Goygol, Azerbaijan, built by German settlers in the 19th century. This house, embodying elements of the German architectural style, stands out from the other buildings on the street. Its facades are decorated with carved elements, and the owner's name is engraved on the top of the wooden doors. These houses were created by German families who moved to the region from Europe and built more than 500 houses, forming 6 streets. Currently, traces of German heritage can be found in the city in the form of architectural examples.

== Restoration ==
Journalists visited these buildings, during which they inspected the restoration work. The largest of these monuments is located on the main street of Homer, covering an area of 1380 square meters and consisting of 7 large rooms. In the 1850s, European traders visiting Goygol admired the wines produced by the Germans. Subsequently, the export of Goygol wines to European countries and Tsarist Russia began. To store the wines produced, a factory was built and underground cellars were created, reminiscent of "underground cities".

== Legacy and Continuation of Tradition ==
The article notes the importance of these underground cellars for storing wine and emphasizes that the stable air temperature in these cellars played a key role in the long-term preservation of the drink. Work has been carried out to restore and clean these buildings, and they are now supplied with electricity. It is expected that in the coming years these cellars will be made available as a tourism facility for visitors and local residents.

=== Architectural Heritage and History ===
Vohrer's house is an architectural structure in the city of Goygol, Azerbaijan, built by German settlers in the 19th century. This castle is distinguished by its outstanding style, which represents elements of German architecture. The structure was part of a settlement consisting of 124 German families resettled in the Caucasus. They created 6 streets and built over 500 houses, leaving their mark in the form of magnificent architectural examples.

=== History and Meaning ===
The history of Vohrer's house is connected with the development of winemaking in the region. In the 1850s, traders from Europe visiting Goygol admired the local wines, and wine exports to Europe and Russia began. A wine production plant was built and underground cellars were created for storing wine, important for maintaining a stable temperature.

== Tourism and Recovery ==
Today, Vohrer's house is undergoing restoration and restoration work. This work includes updating the electrical supply and cleaning the structure. There are plans to make these cellars available for use by tourists and local residents in the coming years as a tourism facility.

Vohrer's house is not only an architectural artifact, but also a symbol of the cultural heritage of the German population. With its restoration and opening to tourists, it is a key tourism destination in Goygol, attracting the attention of both local and foreign visitors to the rich history of the region.

== See also ==
- Goygol
