= Qızılqaya =

Qızılqaya may refer to:

- Qızılqaya, Goygol, Azerbaijan
- Qızılqaya, Kalbajar, Azerbaijan
