= Lawrence Kun =

Soviet politician (1884–1942)

Lawrence Kun Лоренц Яковлевич Кун

member of Parliament of the Azerbaijan Democratic Republic
- In office December 1918 – April 1920

Personal details
- Born: 1884 Yelenendorf, Russian Empire (today the city of Goygol in Azerbaijan)
- Died: 1942 (aged 57–58) Ukhta, Komi ASSR, Russian SFSR, USSR

Lawrence Jacob Kun (German:, 1884–1942) was an engineer and member of the parliament of the Azerbaijan Democratic Republic from the National Minority faction.

== Life ==
Born in 1884 in Yelenendorf (today the city of Goygol in Azerbaijan) in German family by nationality.

From 1915 he worked for the oil industrialist Beckendorf as a field manager. He was a member of the German National Committee of Yelenendorf.

During the years of Azerbaijan's independence (1918-1920), he was elected a deputy of the ADR parliament from the German population. He was a member and chairman of the "National Minorities" faction. In his welcoming speech, on behalf of the German population, at the second sitting of the parliament on December 10, 1918, he stressed that over 100 years of life in Azerbaijan between Azerbaijani Turks and Germans “the most sincere good-neighborly relations have never been broken; the Germans of the ADR calmly look into their future, firmly believing in the preservation of their own national identity and the continuation of a peaceful working life, working for the benefit and prosperity of free Azerbaijan ”.

After the occupation of Azerbaijan by Bolsheviks, in the 1920s he worked as an engineer in the local industry department of the Ganja region. He was a member of the board of the production cooperative of winegrowers and winemakers of the Ganja region "Concordia". His responsibilities included the management of the technical part, as well as office work and cultural and educational work.

In 1925 he was arrested by the State Political Directorate and sentenced to 8 years. He was released five years later. From 1930 he worked in the Gruzneft in the positions of: head of the planning and production department, then chief engineer. During 1933–1934, he worked as a chief engineer of the Mirzaan field (Georgia).

Arrested again on February 18, 1938, sentenced to 5 years in prison. In 1940 he was exiled to the Urals. He died in exile in 1942.

== Family ==
- Wife - Forer Lina Henryovna Kun (b. 1898-d.?, daughter of Henry Forer, one of the founders of the "Forer Brothers Company")
- Daughter - Getruda Kun (b. 1917 - d.?)
- Son - Alfred Kun (b. 1925-d.?)
- Brothers - Robert Kun (b. 1870-d.?), Emmanuel Kun (b. 1881-?)

== See also ==
- Germans in Azerbaijan
