= St. John's Church, Goygol =

Former Lutheran church, now museum, in Goygol, Azerbaijan

St. John's Church
- Azerbaijani: Müqəddəs İohann kilsəsi; German: St. Johanniskirche
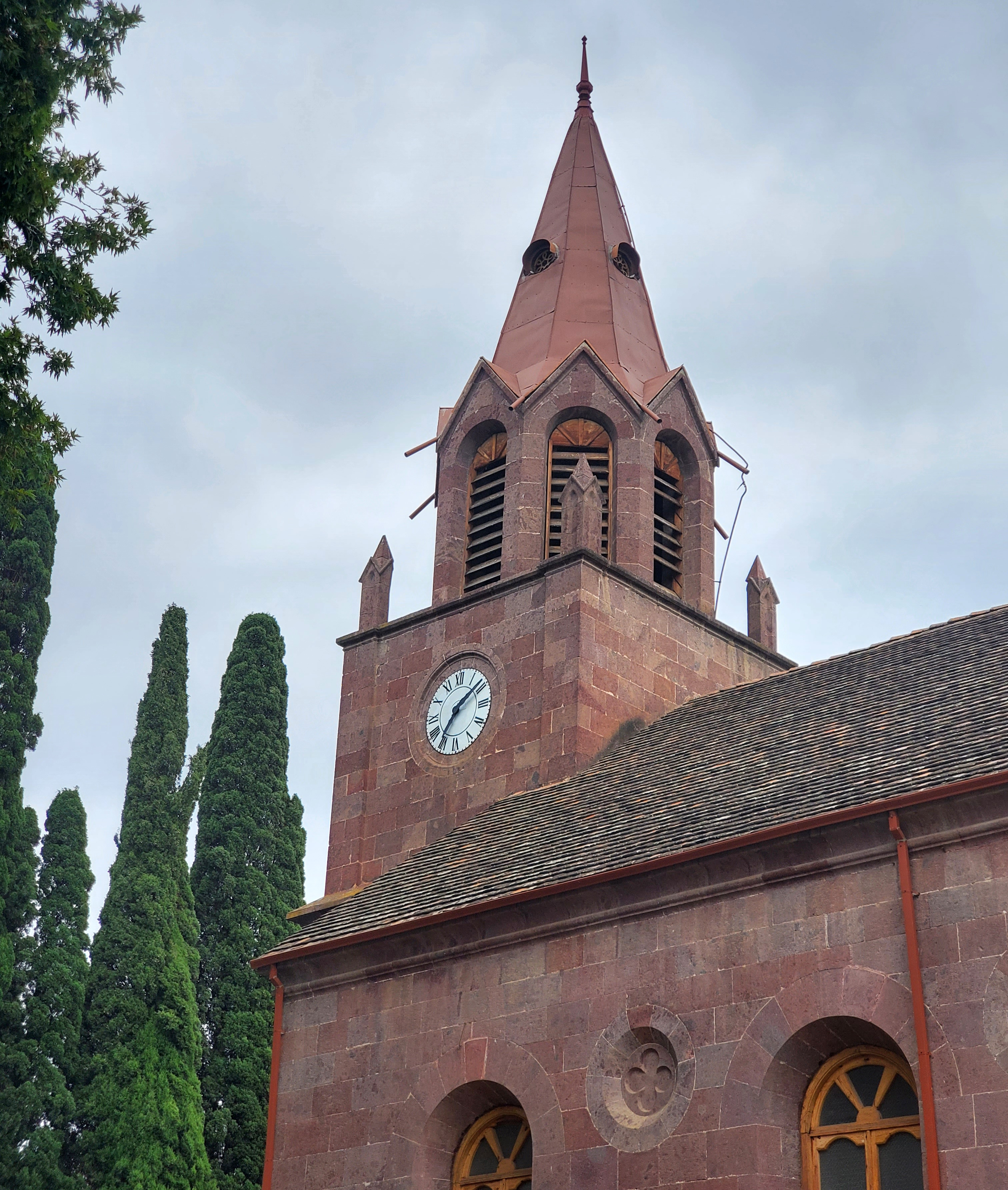
- Clocktower of the former church, now museum, in 2022
- St. John's Church
- 40°35′13″N 46°18′57″E
- Address: Goygol, Goygol District
- Country: Azerbaijan
- Denomination: German Lutheran Church (former)

History
- Status: Church (1857–1939); Profane use (1939–1991); Museum (since 2005)
- Consecrated: 1857

Architecture
- Functional status: Abandoned (as a church); Renovated and repurposed (as a museum)
- Style: Gothic Revival
- Groundbreaking: 1854
- Completed: 1857

Specifications
- Length: 36.6 m (120 ft)
- Width: 13.3 m (44 ft)

The Saint John's Church (Azerbaijani: Müqəddəs İohann kilsəsi; German: St. Johanniskirche) is a former Lutheran church in Goygol (formerly known as Helenendorf and later Khanlar), Azerbaijan. Completed in 1857, it was the first German Lutheran church built in Azerbaijan.

The church was included on the list of immovable historical and cultural monuments of local importance by decision No. 132 issued by the Cabinet of Ministers of the Republic of Azerbaijan on August 2, 2001, soon after Azerbaijan restored its independence.

The former church building currently houses the Goygol Museum of History and Ethnography.

== History ==
In 1817, several hundred families of Swabian Lutheran pietists arrived in Russian Empire with the permission of Emperor Alexander I. Nearly 700 of them were resettled in Transcaucasia, where as many as 120 of them founded the colony of Helenendorf. After the colony was established, a Lutheran congregation was officially established. The first religious rituals were held by teachers of the parish school until a priest from Hanover was invited in 1832 to run the congregation.

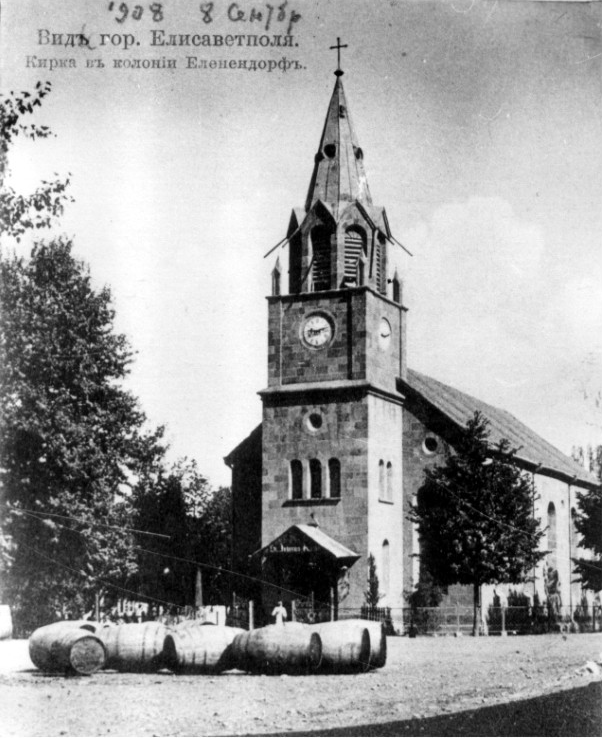
St.John's church in 1908

Over time, the need for a place of worship became apparent. The cornerstone for the church was laid next to the parish school on 24 April 1854. The Gothic Revival church, constructed over three years and consecrated as St. John's Church, became the first Lutheran church building in Azerbaijan. Its first appointed pastor was Georg Heinrich Reitenbach. The church organ was manufactured by E. F. Walcker & Cie., a Ludwigsburg-based company. The building, constructed from red brick, has a single clock tower, 16 large and two small windows, all crafted from wood, and two entrance doors. The church measures 13.3 m (44 ft) in width, 36.6 m (120 ft) in length, and has a ceiling height of 8.6 m (28 ft).

=== During the Soviet era ===
In 1928, eight years after the Sovietisation of Azerbaijan, the Soviet government launched an anti-religious campaign. Between 1936 and 1938, all Azerbaijani Lutheran pastors were arrested. The last priest of Helenendorf's St. John's Church, Reverend Otto Wenzel, was arrested for the first time in 1931. He was liberated shortly afterwards and continue to exercise his duties until 1936. The last confirmation ceremony at St. Jonh's Churchtook place in the church in 1934 and was attended by 85 teenagers. In 1936, Wenzel was arrested a second time and freed in 1939, only to be arrested again later that year. After his arrest, the church bell and the organ were removed from the church. The church building was locked down after the central government in Moscow ordered for all citizens of German origin to be deported from Azerbaijan and Georgia in 1941–1942, following the German army's offensive towards the Caucasus during World War II. At different times, the building served as an indoor arena and a military hospital.

== After independence ==
The church was included on the list of immovable historical and cultural monuments of local importance by decision No. 132 issued by the Cabinet of Ministers of the Republic of Azerbaijan on August 2, 2001, just after the Azerbaijan Republic restored its independence.

Since 2005, the church houses the Goygol Museum of History and Ethnography.

In 2008, St. John's Church underwent renovatation with the financial support of the German Development Cooperation. The tower was supplied with a clock and bells thanks to fundraising efforts of EuroKaukAsia, a German society for culture and science.

== Gallery ==
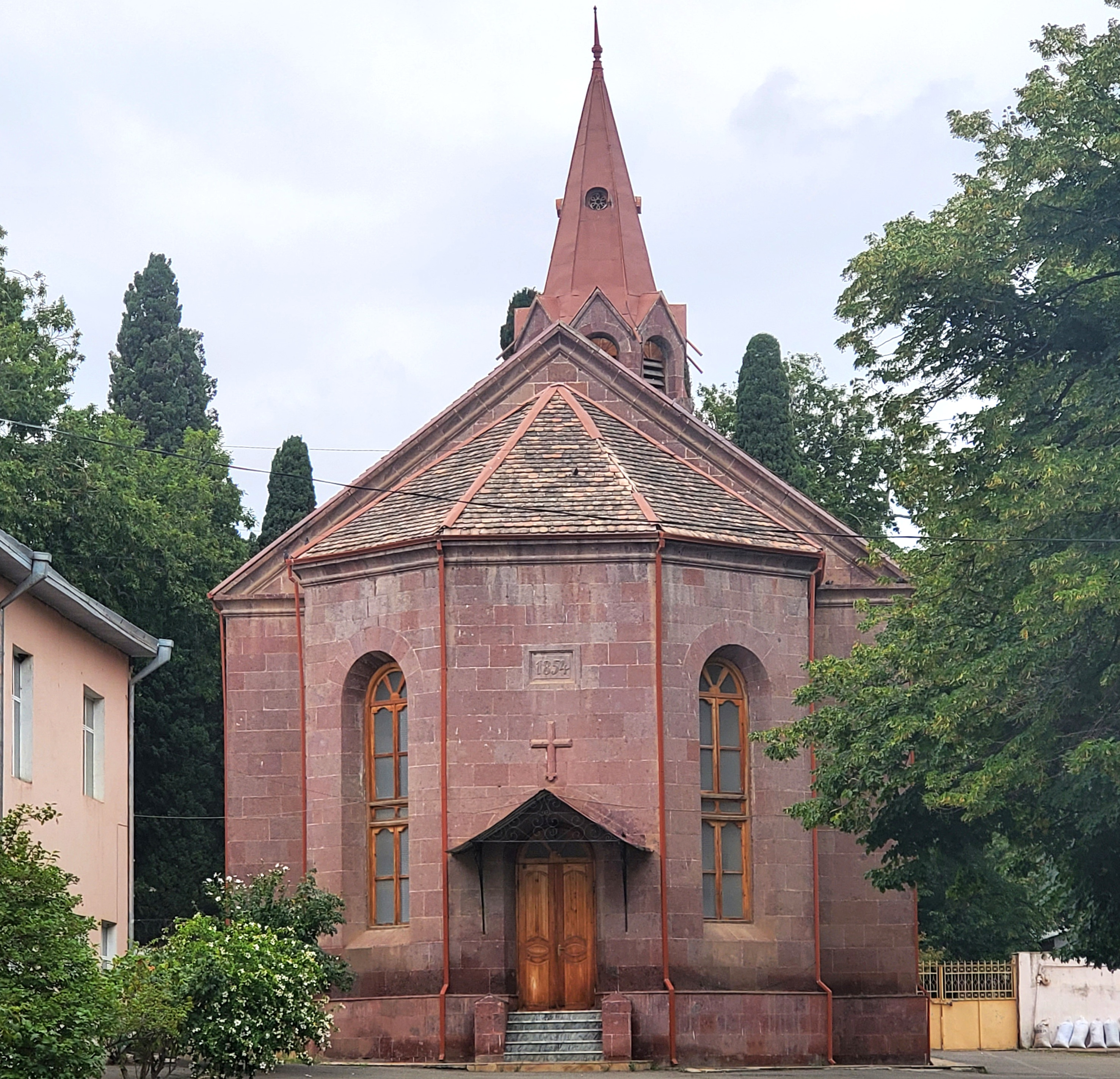

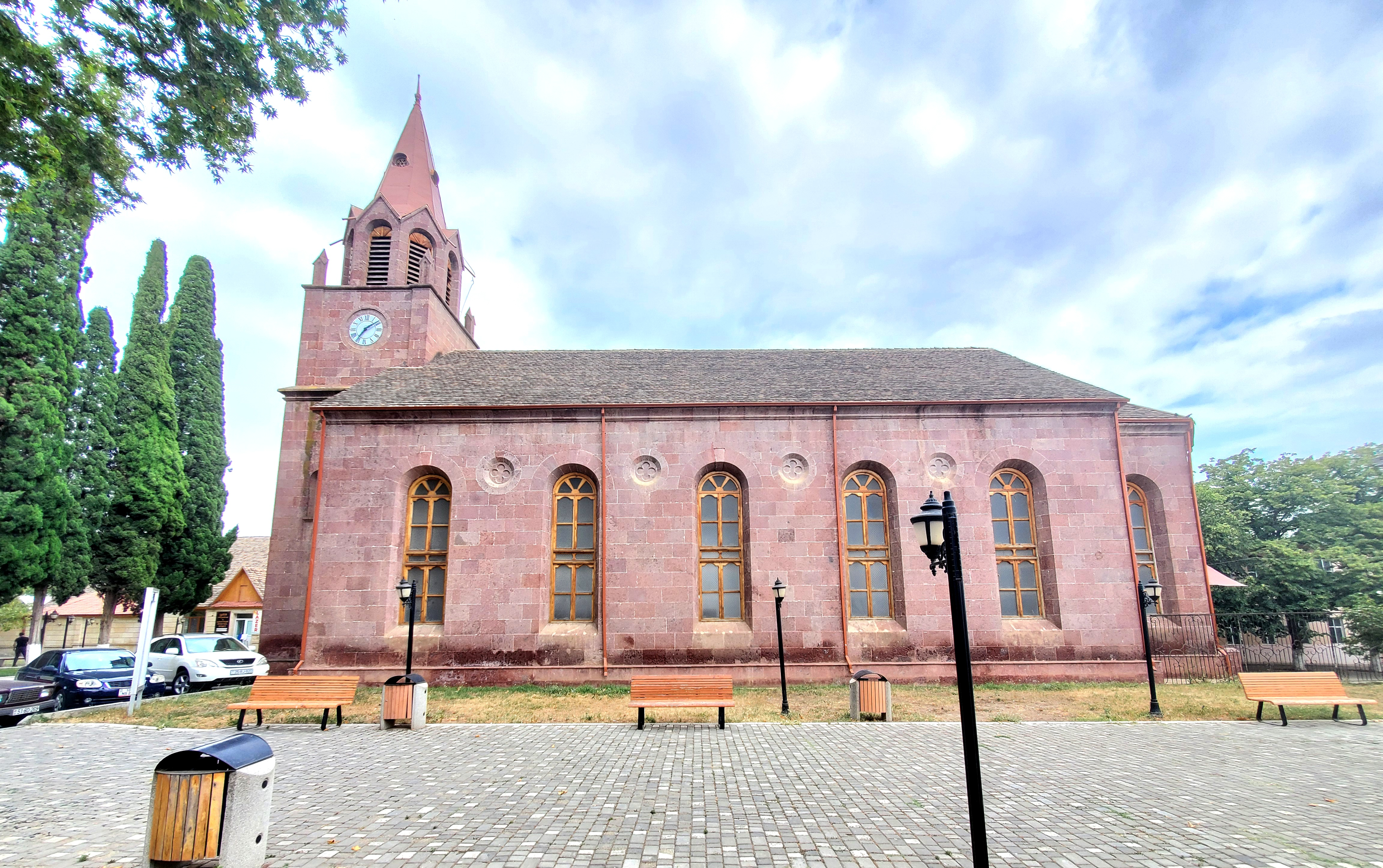

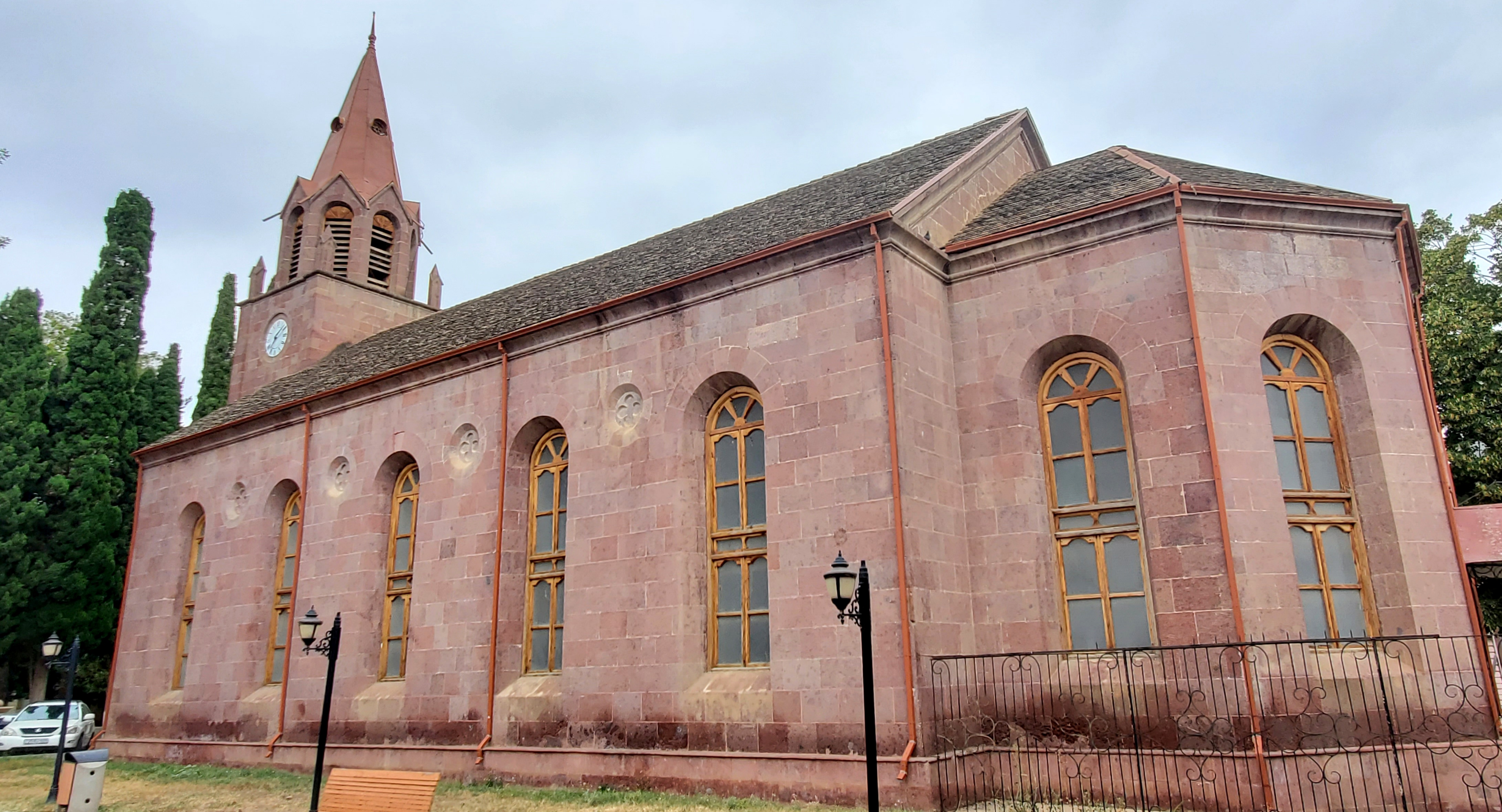

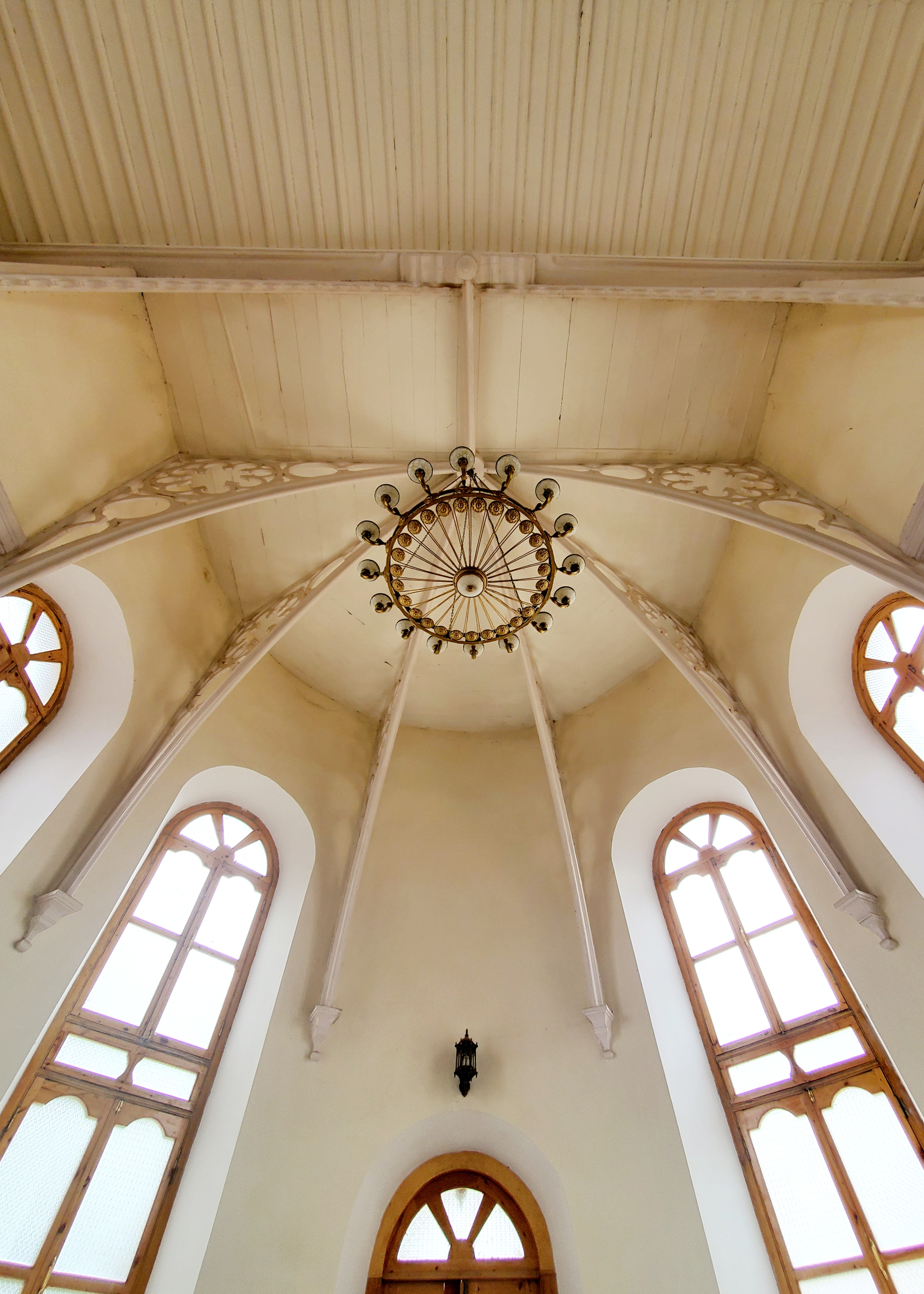

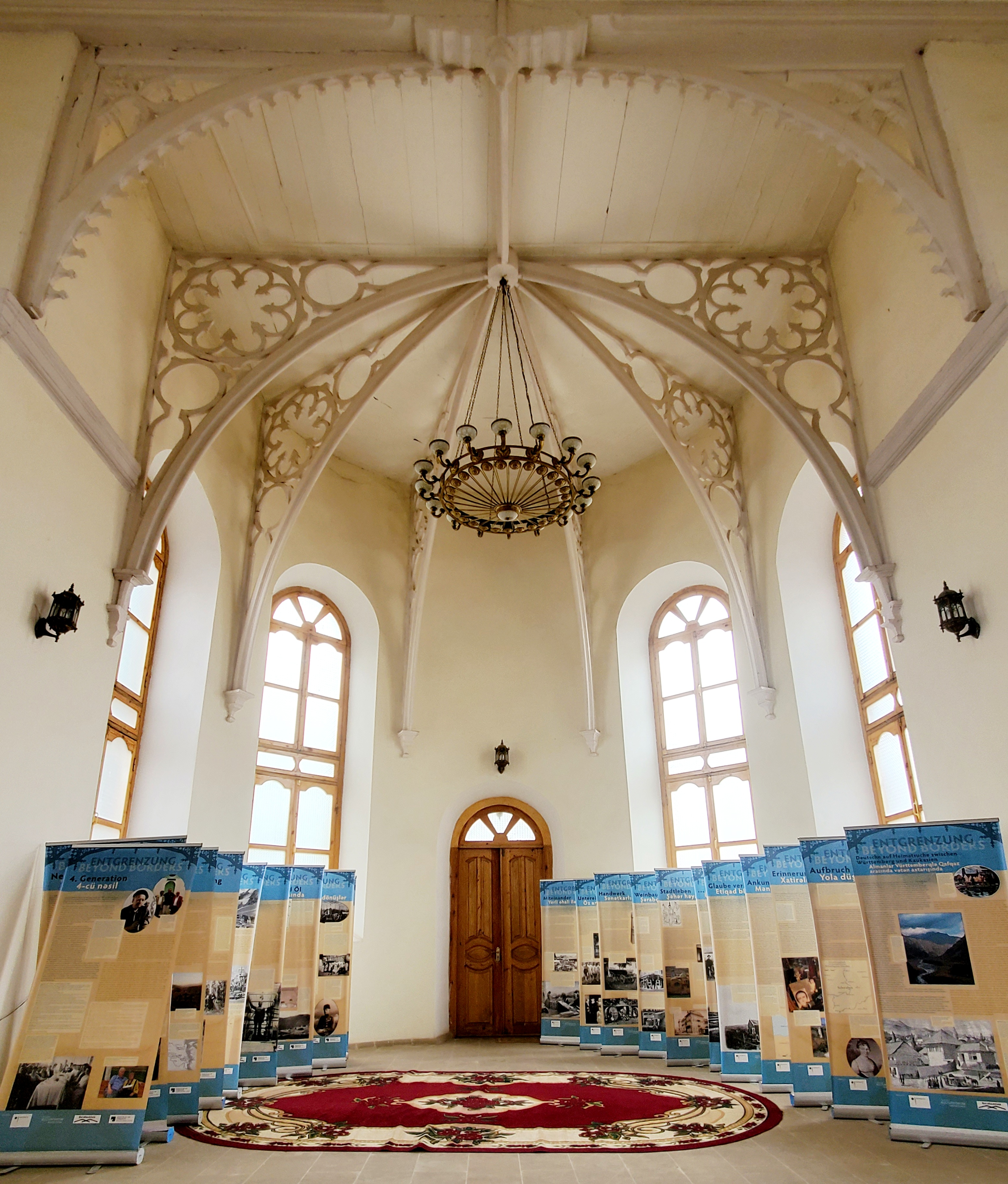

== See also ==
- Germany–Azerbaijan relations
- Christianity in Azerbaijan
