= Masyar Rahmanzadeh =

German orthopedic surgeon (born 1968)

- Born: 1968 (age 57–58); Germany
- Education: Humboldt University of Berlin; University of Mainz
- Known for: Conducting arthroplasty and podiatric surgery
- Medical career
- Field: Surgeon
- Institutions: Gelenkzentrum Berlin

Masyar Rahmanzadeh (born 1968) is a German orthopedic surgeon, specializing in arthroplasty and podiatric surgery, son of Iranian-German academic Rahim Rahmanzadeh. He is also known as a founder and director of a private clinic center, named «Gelenkzentrum Berlin».

== Biography ==
Masyar Rahmanzadeh was born in 1968, in Germany.

From 1988 to 1995, he studied medicine at the Humboldt University of Berlin, University of Paris, RWTH Aachen University and Albert Einstein College of Medicine in New York.

From 1995 to 2001, he held resident positions in Krefeld, Heidelberg and Berlin.

In 2001, he founded the Berlin Joint Center (German: Gelenkzentrum Berlin), specializing in hip and knee replacements and podiatric surgery.

From 2011 to 2015 he served as a managing director of Hygiea Medical Clinic.

In 2016 he served as Chief Physician of the Vivantes Clinic, specializing in endoprosthetics and foot and knee surgery.

Masyar Rahmanzadeh currently partakes in performing hip and knee replacement surgeries. He has been creating a surgical technique for treating forefoot deformities, allowing both legs to be operated on simultaneously, enabling patients to walk independently without crutches within a few days. Over the course of his career he has performed over 17,000 such procedures.

== Political views ==
Masyar Rahmanzadeh is also known by his anti-Muslim and anti-immigrant views. In September 2026, he published a video in which he harshly criticized the political situation in Berlin, accusing local left-wing forces of ineffectiveness and dangerous alliances with radical Islamist circles, drawing parallels with Iran on the eve of the 1979 revolution, asserting he would emigrate from Berlin if Die Linke would conquer opposing political forces.
