= Germans in Azerbaijan =

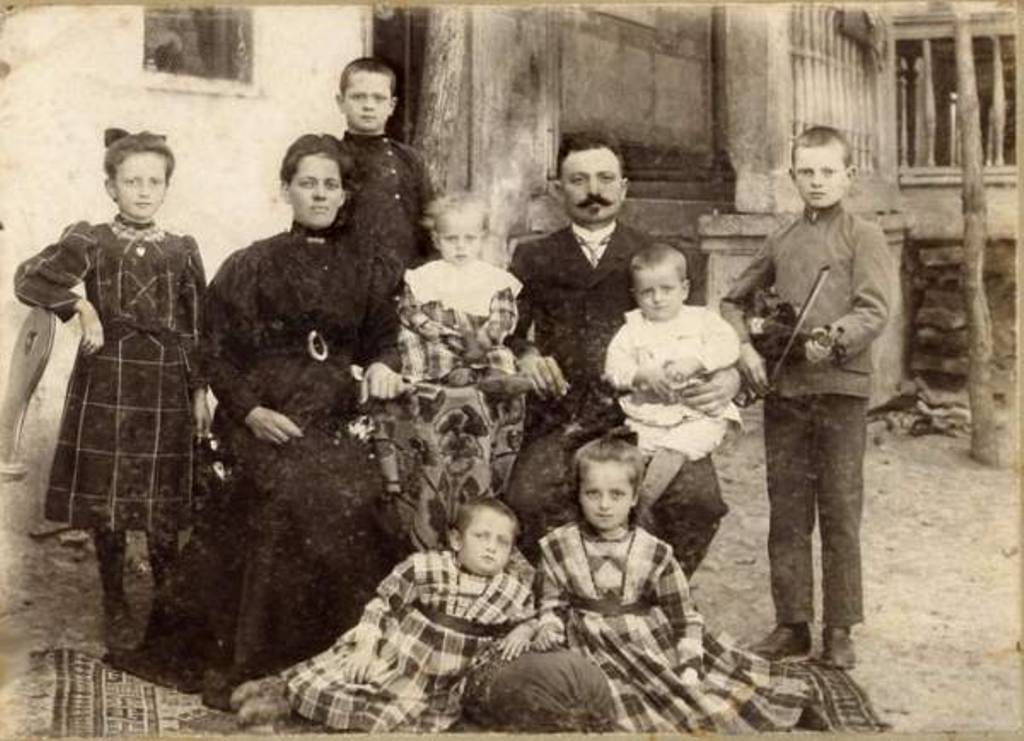
A Swabian family in Helenendorf

Germans have lived in Azerbaijan since the 1810s, with a large concentration of them once found in the western part of the country. The community grew out of two original settlements founded by German settlers from Württemberg who settled here in 1819. During World War II, it virtually ceased to exist as the Soviet government, which ruled Azerbaijan at the time, grew wary of the ethnic Germans potentially sympathising with the advancing army of the Third Reich and deported them to Central Asia in 1942.

== History ==
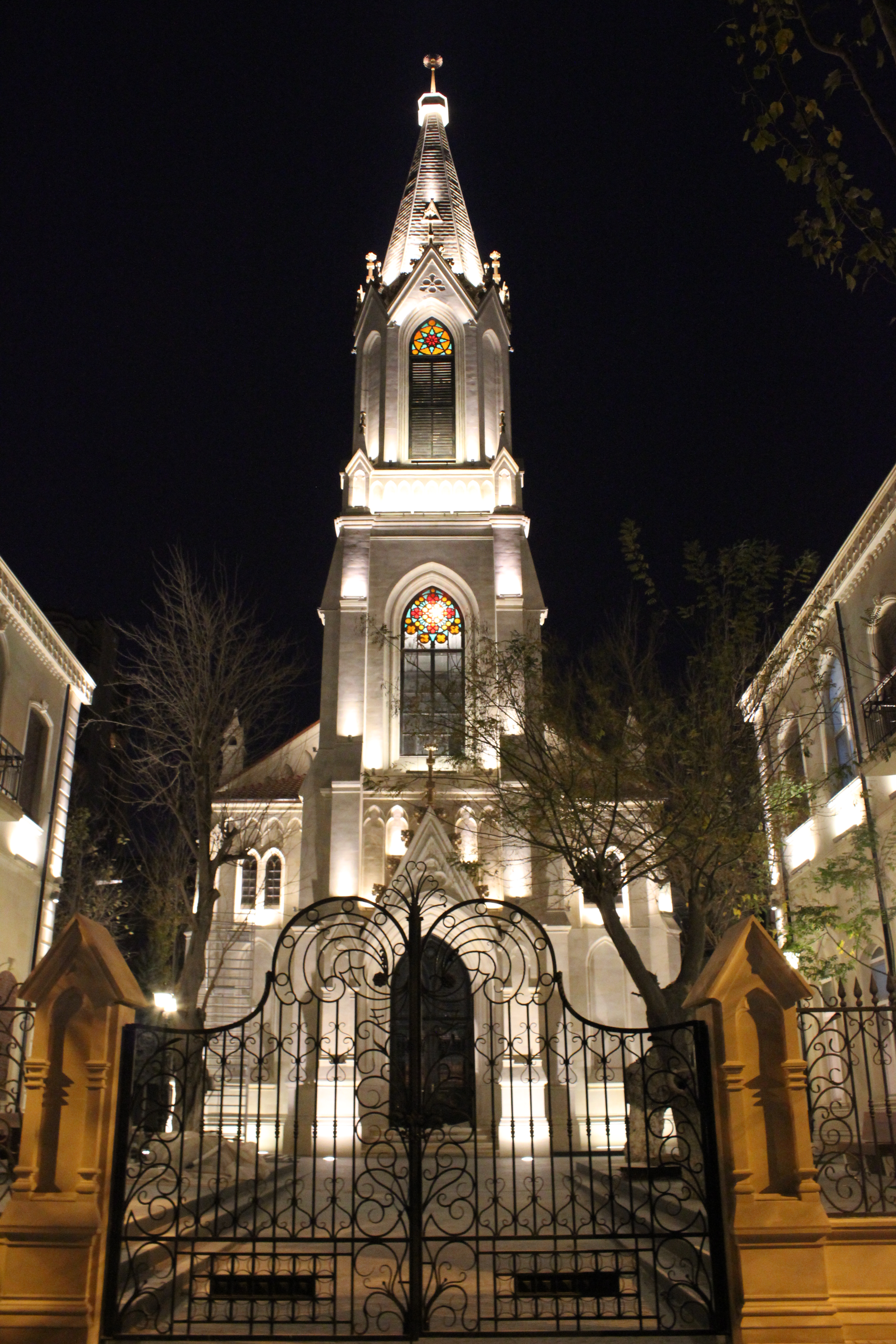
Church of the Saviour, a German church in Baku, Azerbaijan

The history of German settlements on the territory of Azerbaijan began when German villagers from Württemberg to the South Caucasus were resettled in what is now Azerbaijan. Two German colonies—Helenendorf and Annenfeld—were founded in what later became the Elizavetpol uezd in 1819. Later, the number of German settlements increased and reached eight by the beginning of the twentieth century, namely Helenendorf, Annenfeld, Georgsfeld, Alexejewka, Grünfeld, Eichenfeld, Traubenfeld, and Jelisawetinka.

== Economy ==
German colonists worked in the field of viticulture and wine growing in Azerbaijan. The Vohrer and Hummel families ran wineries and owned several farms. Beer and cognac factories were built by the Vohrer brothers' firm in Helenendorf. Agriculture and various kinds of art also developed. In 1922, a state-owned wine-making production named "Concordia" was established here and in the 1930s, kolkhozes began to function.

== Education ==
Education and culture in the cultural life of the German community were of great importance. In 1842, the first school building was built in Helenendorf. A total of eight schools functioned in the German villages of Azerbaijan, and one functioned in Baku starting in the mid-1920s. At the end of 1920, engineering school, and in the 1930s the vine-growing and wine-making school began to function in Helenendorf.

== Culture ==
Lutheran churches were established in Helenendorf in 1854 and in Annenfeld in 1909. They were designed by German architects Eichler and Lehmkuhl. A Lutheran church opened in Baku in 1899.

In 1918–1920, Lorenz Kuhn was the representative of the German population in the parliament of the Democratic Republic of Azerbaijan. At that time, one of important historical events in the Germans' life took place, the 100th anniversary of the Germans' settlement and Helenendorf colony were celebrated in Azerbaijan on June 9, 1919.

After the establishment of Soviet rule, the German-language newspapers "Bauer und Arbeiter" and "Lenins Weg" were published in Azerbaijan. In 1928, an Ethnological Museum was opened in Helenendorf by the initiative of archaeologist Hummel. A cultural club was organized in Helenendorf, which included a theatre, sports associations, an orchestra, a choir, and a library.

== Deportation ==
In 1941–1942, during World War II, Germans living in the USSR, including in Azerbaijan, were deported to Central Asia and Siberia by the decision of the Soviet leadership as part of the population transfer in the Soviet Union.

== Today ==
Cultural events, concerts, exhibitions are held by the Kapellhaus German-Azerbaijani Cultural Association in Baku. Buildings built on the basis of German architectural projects are preserved in Azerbaijan.

== See also ==
- Lawrence Kun
- Goygol (city)
- Boyuk Zira
- Mingachevir
