= Qızılqaya, Goygol =

Village in Goygol, Azerbaijan

Qızılqaya is a village in the municipality of Goygol in the Goygol Rayon of Azerbaijan.
