= Rahim Rahmanzadeh =

Iranian surgeon (born 1934)

Rahim Rahmanzadeh رحیم رحمان‌زاده
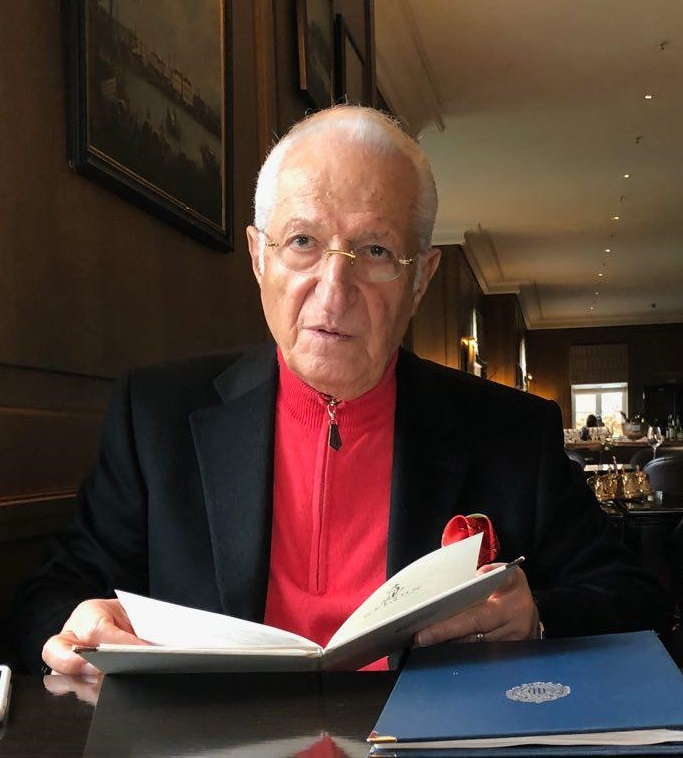
- Rahmanzadeh in 2018
- Born: 13 June 1934 (age 92); Shabestar, Iran
- Education: Alborz High School; University of Istanbul
- Known for: The founder of modern surgery, orthopedic traumatic, surgical techniques specific
- Children: Masyar Rahmanzadeh
- Scientific career
- Fields: Academic, physician
- Workplaces: University of Mainz; University of Berlin

Rahim Rahmanzadeh (Persian: رحیم رحمان‌زاده; born 13 June 1934 in Shabestar, East Azerbaijan) is an Iranian-German academic, physician and surgeon at the University of Berlin and University of Mainz. Rahmanzadeh is president of the International Center for Bone and Joint Surgery in Berlin.
