= Shahla Aghapour =

Iranian artist

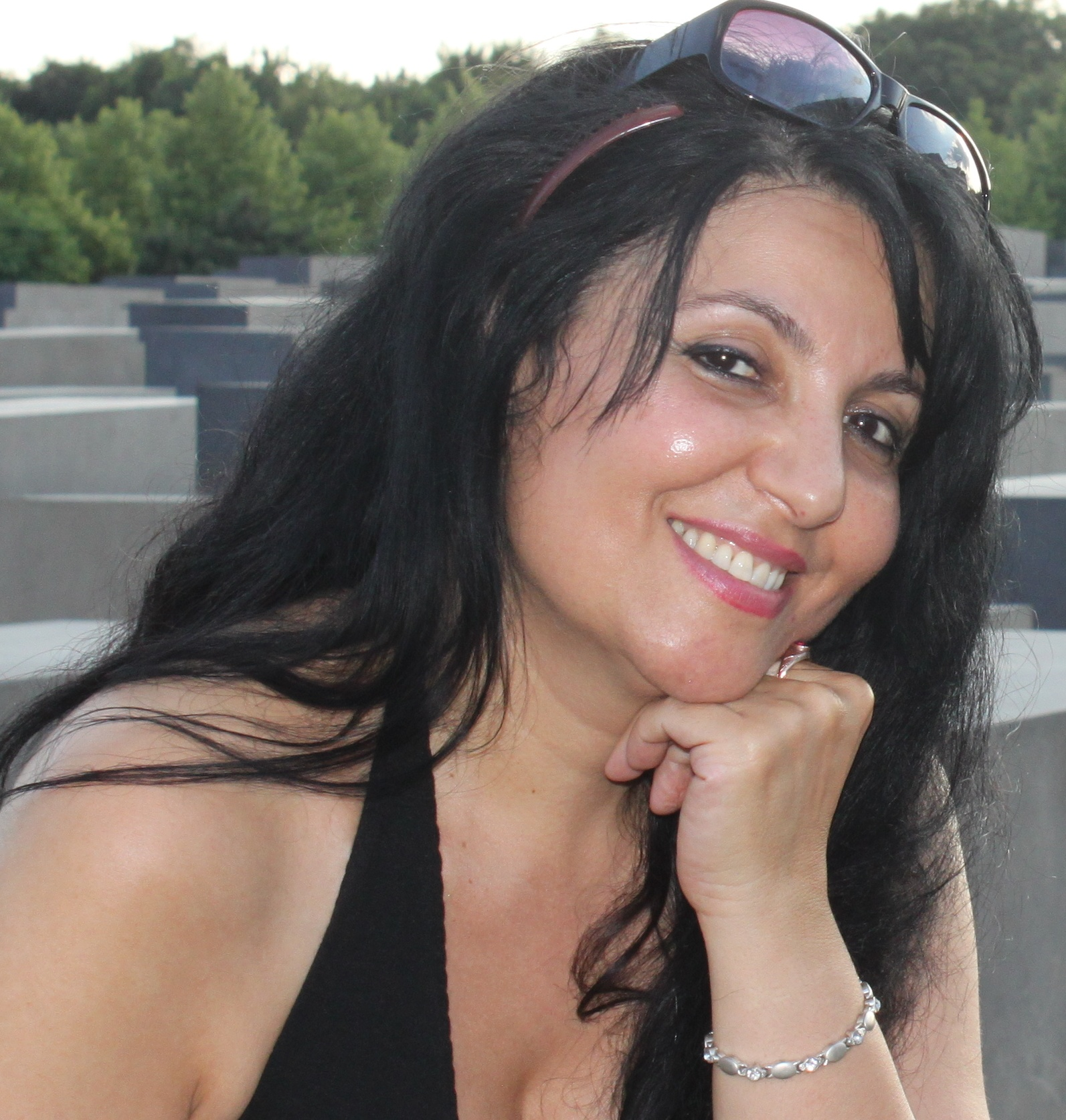
- Born: Tehran, Iran
- Other name: Shahla Aghapour–Benakohell
- Education: Berlin University of the Arts
- Occupations: Visual artist, author, gallery director
- Website: www.aghapour.de

Shahla Aghapour, also known as Shahla Aghapour–Benakohell (Persian: شهلا آقاپور) is an Iranian visual artist, author and gallery director living in Germany. She works both as a writer and poet, as well as a painter, sculptor, performance artist and director of Galerie-Benakohell.

== Biography ==
Shahla Aghapour worked as a freelance artist in Berlin and has exhibited her works and readings in Germany and other countries. She completed a Master of Art degree at the Berlin University of the Arts in Art in Context in 2003 and works as an art teacher and head of artistic projects.

Aghapour is a member of the Federal Association of Artists in Germany, PEN Center of writers in exile of German-speaking countries and was from 2007 to 2009 chairman of the Iranian Writers' Association in exile. Aghapour is also a member of the “Group Seven” collective: a group of five Iranian women artists living and working in Germany, with a focus on women and social, cultural, and political issues around the world, especially relating to Iran.

== Work ==
=== Exhibitions ===
This is a list of select exhibitions, in order by date.

- 1996 – Cultural Center Spandau, Berlin, Germany
- 1997 – Landtag of Prussian, gallery in parliament Berlin House of Representatives, Germany
- 2008 – Island Gallery, Berlin, Germany
- 2009 - "Iranian night" (in book week of Germany), exhibition of painting about woman face and body, wives of current and former presidents of Germany had joined to the meeting
- 2011 – Hilton Hotel, Houston, Texas, United States
- 2011 – Persian Culture Center, Dallas/Richardson, Texas, United States
- 2012 – Salon Exil, Berlin, Germany
- 2015 – Galerie-Benakohell, Berlin, Germany

=== Readings ===
- Culture Club, Zurich, Switzerland
- Cultural Association, Lugano, Switzerland
- 2011 – Persian Culture Center, Dallas/Richardson, Texas, United States

=== Publications ===
- Aghapour, Shahla (2005). Andishaje hessi [Soulful Thoughts, Poems for Life and Love] (in Persian). Tehran, Iran: Gheze Publisher. ISBN 9645776562.
- Sarate garme hes (Parts of Emotions), (in Persian), Aida Publishing, Bochum, Germany
- Ashovtegieh Djahan (Chaos of the Cosmos), (in Persian), Aida Verlag, Bochum, Germany
- Parvaze sorkhe tan (Flying red bodies), (in Persian), Fourough Books Publishing, Cologne, Germany
- Oliver Twist in Tehran, (in German), POP Publishing, Ludwigsburg, Germany
- Morvarid-e Siah (The Black Pearl) – (in Persian), Aida Publishing, Bochum, Germany
