= Ilham Mammadov =

Azerbaijani footballer and manager (born 1970)

Personal information
- Date of birth: 1 January 1970 (age 56)
- Place of birth: Qazakh, Azerbaijan SSR
- Height: 1.68 m (5 ft 6 in)
- Position: Midfielder

Senior career*
Years	Team	Apps	(Gls)
1987–1991	Göyazan Qazax	61	(6)
1991	Neftchi Baku	4	(0)
1992–1995	Turan Tovuz	93	(34)
1995	Kur Nur	2	(0)
1995–1996	Turan Tovuz	7	(7)
1996–1997	Neftchi Baku	45	(12)
1997–1998	Kapaz	19	(6)
1998–1999	Neftchi Baku	31	(12)
1999–2000	FSV Salmrohr	11	(1)
2000–2001	Eintracht Trier	8	(0)
2001–2005	VfB Fichte Bielefeld	75	(3)
2005–2006	TuS Dornberg	3	(1)
Total		359	(82)

International career
1995–1999	Azerbaijan	8	(0)

Managerial career
- 2008: FC Türk Sport Bielefeld
- * Club domestic league appearances and goals

Ilham Mammadov (Azerbaijani: İlham Məmmədov; born 1 January 1970, Qazakh, Azerbaijan SSR) is an Azerbaijani retired international footballer and manager. He played most of his career as an attacking midfielder for FK Göyazan Qazax, Turan Tovuz and VfB Fichte Bielefeld.

== Career statistics ==
Appearances and goals by club, season and competition
Club	Season	League			National cup (Note: Includes Soviet Cup, Azerbaijan Cup, DFB-Pokal.)		League cup (Note: Includes USSR Federation Cup, DFB Ligapokal.)		Continental		Total	
Club	Season	Division	Apps	Goals	Apps	Goals	Apps	Goals	Apps	Goals	Apps	Goals
Göyazan Qazax	1987	Soviet Second League	14	0								
Göyazan Qazax	1988	Soviet Second League	2	0								
Göyazan Qazax	1990	Soviet Second League	27	3								
Göyazan Qazax	1991	Soviet Second League	18	3								
Göyazan Qazax	Total		61	6								
Neftchi Baku	1991	Soviet First League	4	0								
Turan Tovuz	1992	Azerbaijan Premier League	30	15								
Turan Tovuz	1993	Azerbaijan Premier League	16	6								
Turan Tovuz	1993–94	Azerbaijan Premier League	28	6								
Turan Tovuz	1994–95	Azerbaijan Premier League	19	7					2	0		
Turan Tovuz	Total		93	34					2	0		
Kur Nur	1995–96	Azerbaijan Premier League	2	0								
Turan Tovuz	1995–96	Azerbaijan Premier League	7	7								
Neftchi Baku	1995–96	Azerbaijan Premier League	16	4								
Neftchi Baku	1996–97	Azerbaijan Premier League	29	8					2	0		
Neftchi Baku	Total		45	12					2	0		
Kapaz	1997–98	Azerbaijan Premier League	19	6								
Neftchi Baku	1998–99	Azerbaijan Premier League	31	12								
FSV Salmrohr	1999–2000	Regionalliga Südwest	11	1								
Eintracht Trier	2000–01	Regionalliga Süd	8	0								
VfB Fichte Bielefeld	2001–02	Oberliga Westfalen	16	0								
VfB Fichte Bielefeld	2002–03	Oberliga Westfalen	22	2								
VfB Fichte Bielefeld	2003–04	Oberliga Westfalen	21	0								
VfB Fichte Bielefeld	2004–05	Oberliga Westfalen	16	1								
VfB Fichte Bielefeld	Total		75	3								
TuS Dornberg	2005–06	Landesliga Westfalen	3	1								
Career total			359	82					4	0		
