= Razieh Gholami-Shabani =

Azerbaijani politician (1925–2013)

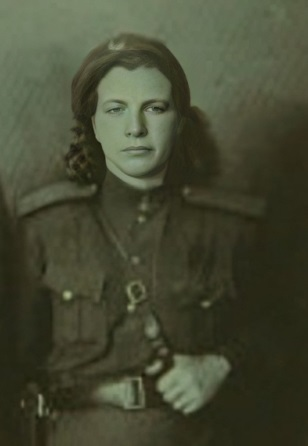
- Born: 21 April 1925; Tabriz, East Azerbaijan, Imperial State of Persia
- Died: 28 January 2013 (aged 87); Cologne, North Rhine-Westphalia, Germany

Razieh Gholami-Shabani (Persian: راضیه غلامی شعبانی; 21 April 1925 – 28 January 2013, Tabriz, Iran) was an Azerbaijani politician and activist. She was the first female political prisoner in Iranian history and was repeatedly arrested and imprisoned for years, by the Pahlavi dynasty for being a member of Azerbaijan People's Government. Her first arrest, in 1946, was at the age of 21. She moved to Germany and described her life in a book entitled "Memoirs of a woman". The book was released by publisher Aida in Germany, but banned shortly after in Iran. Shabani died in Germany on 28 January 2013 at the age of 87.
