= Goygol (city) =

Goygol Helenendorf
- City & Municipality
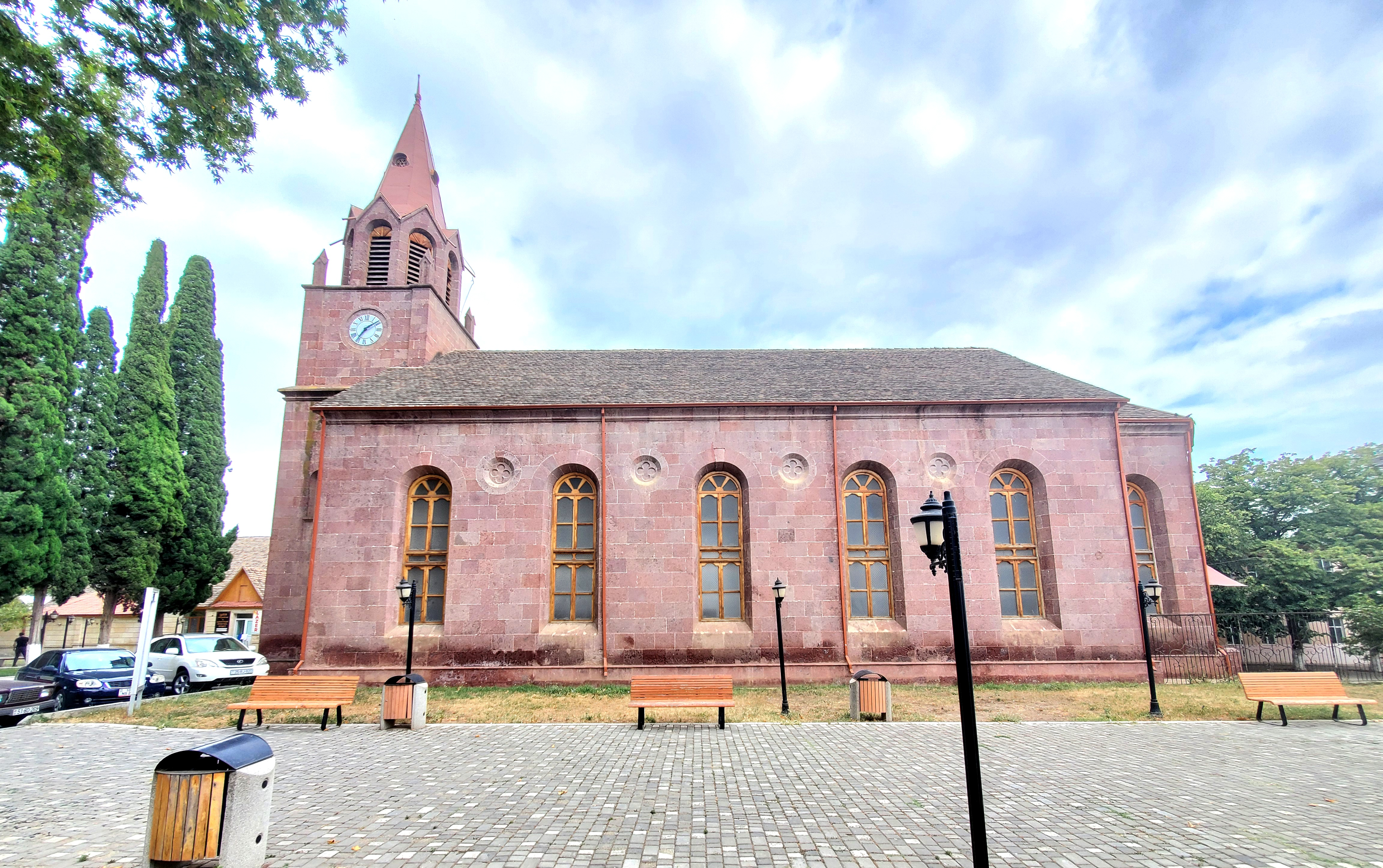
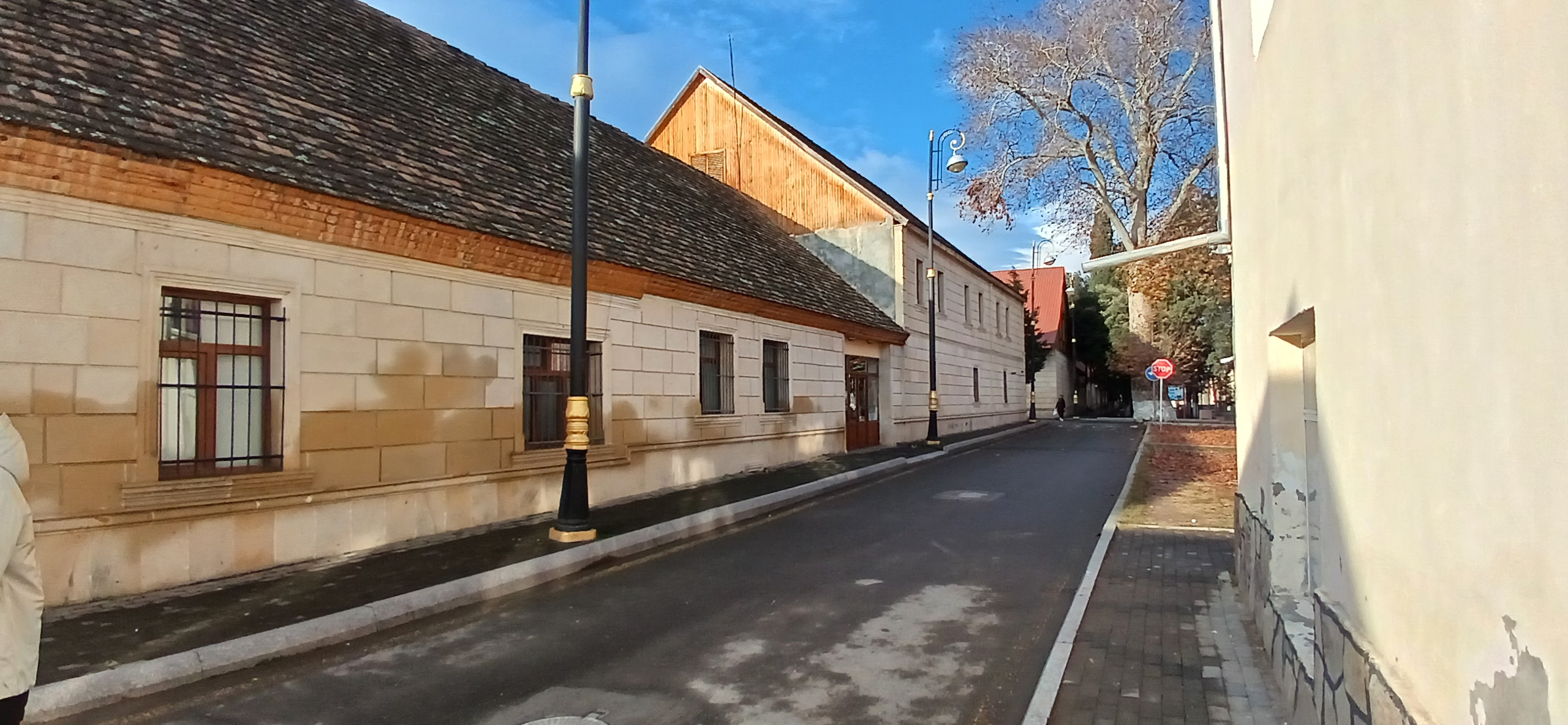
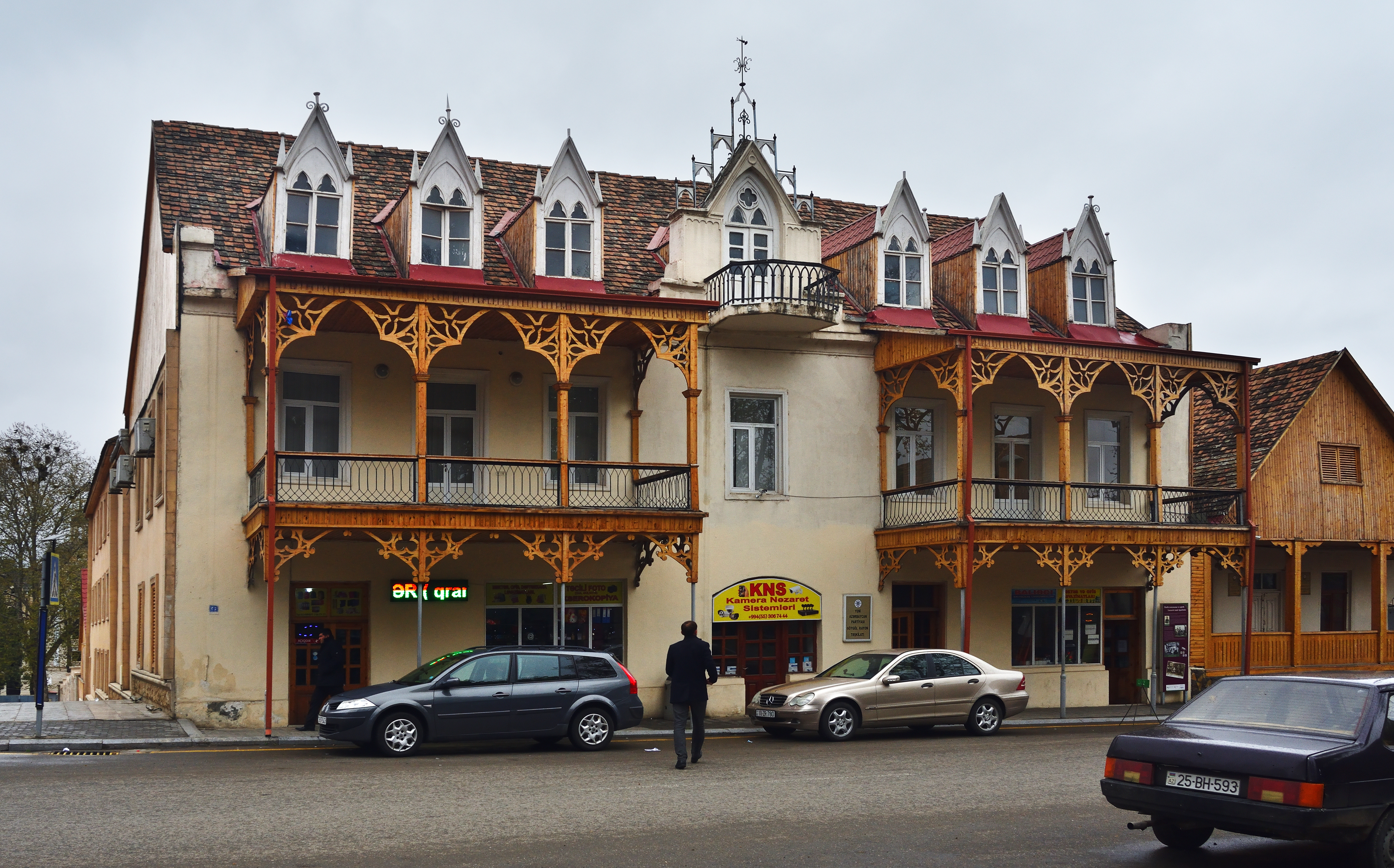
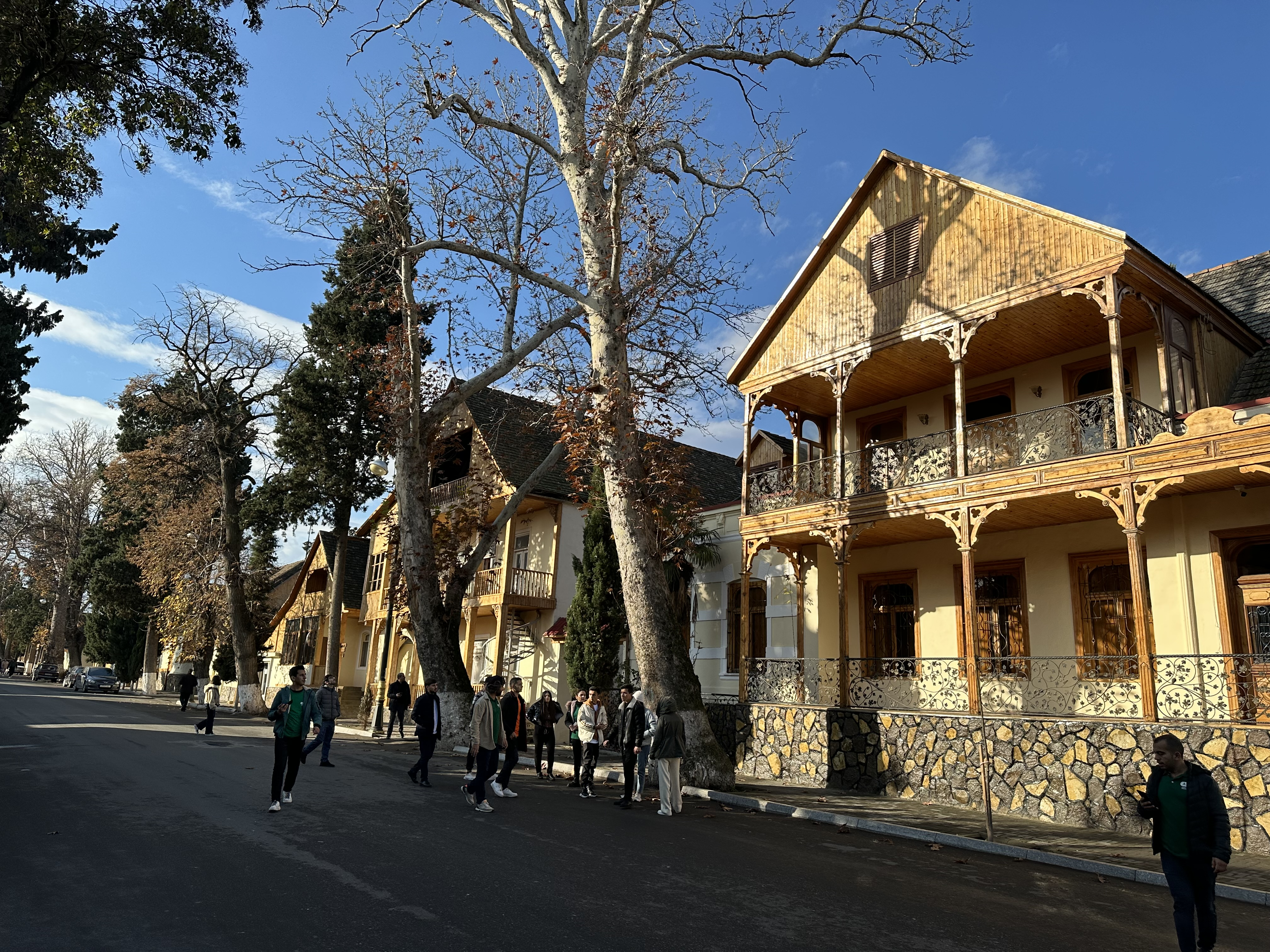
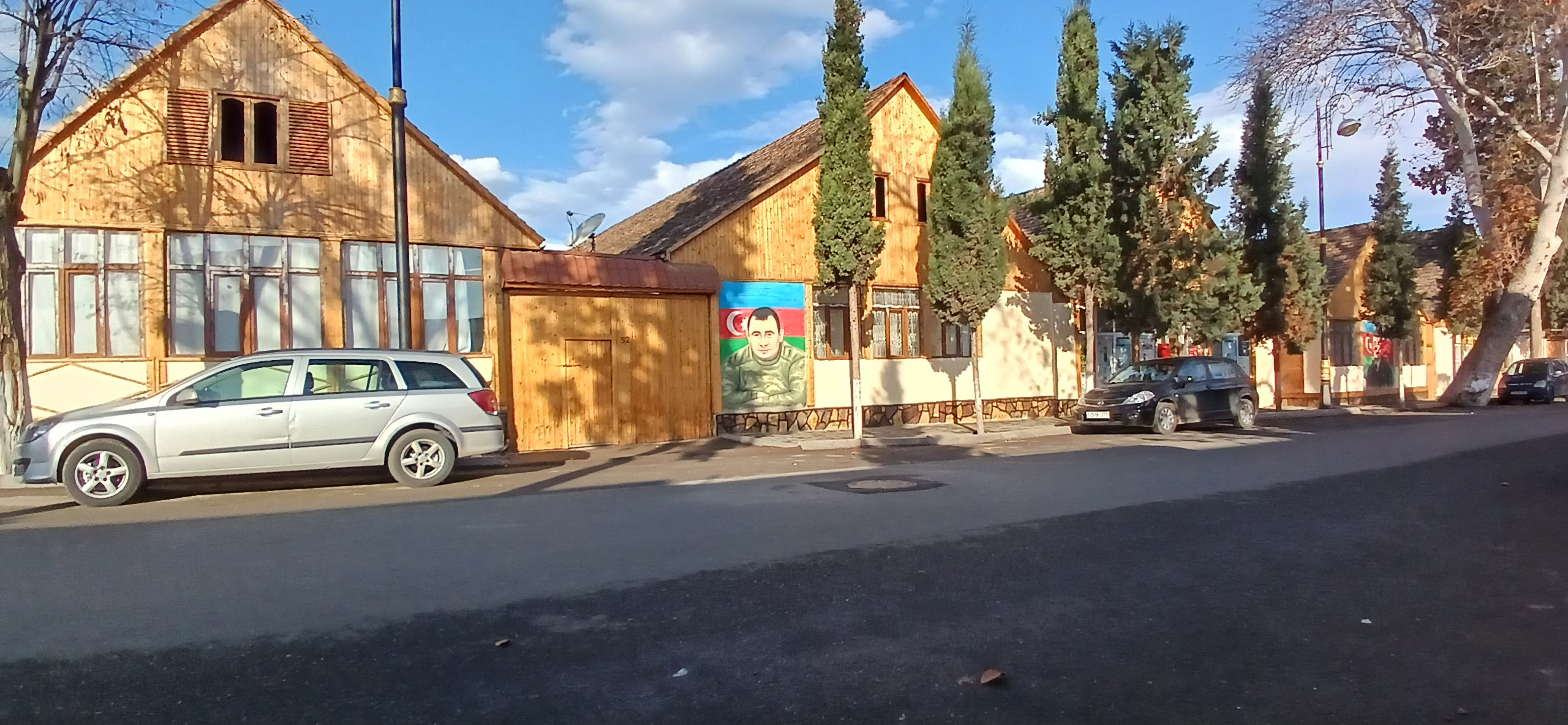
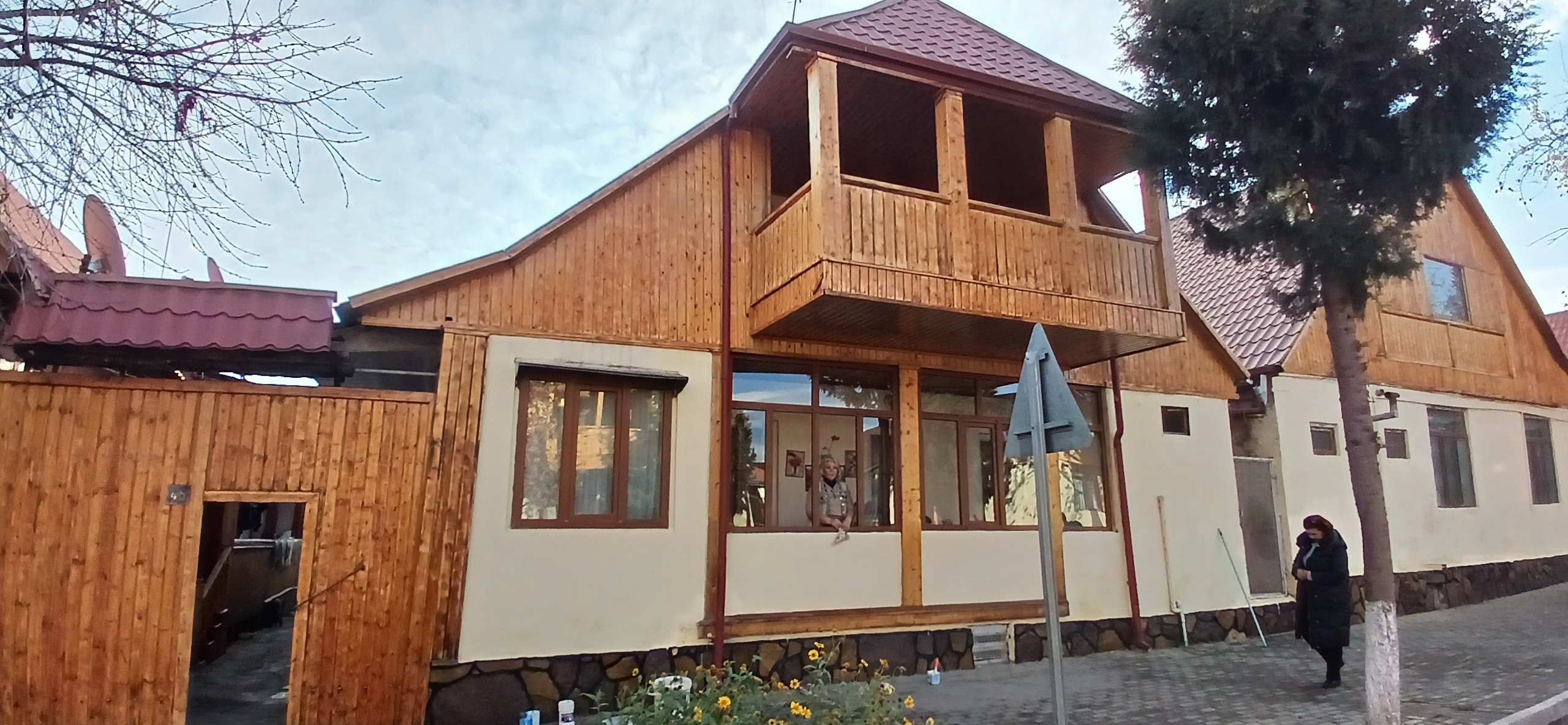
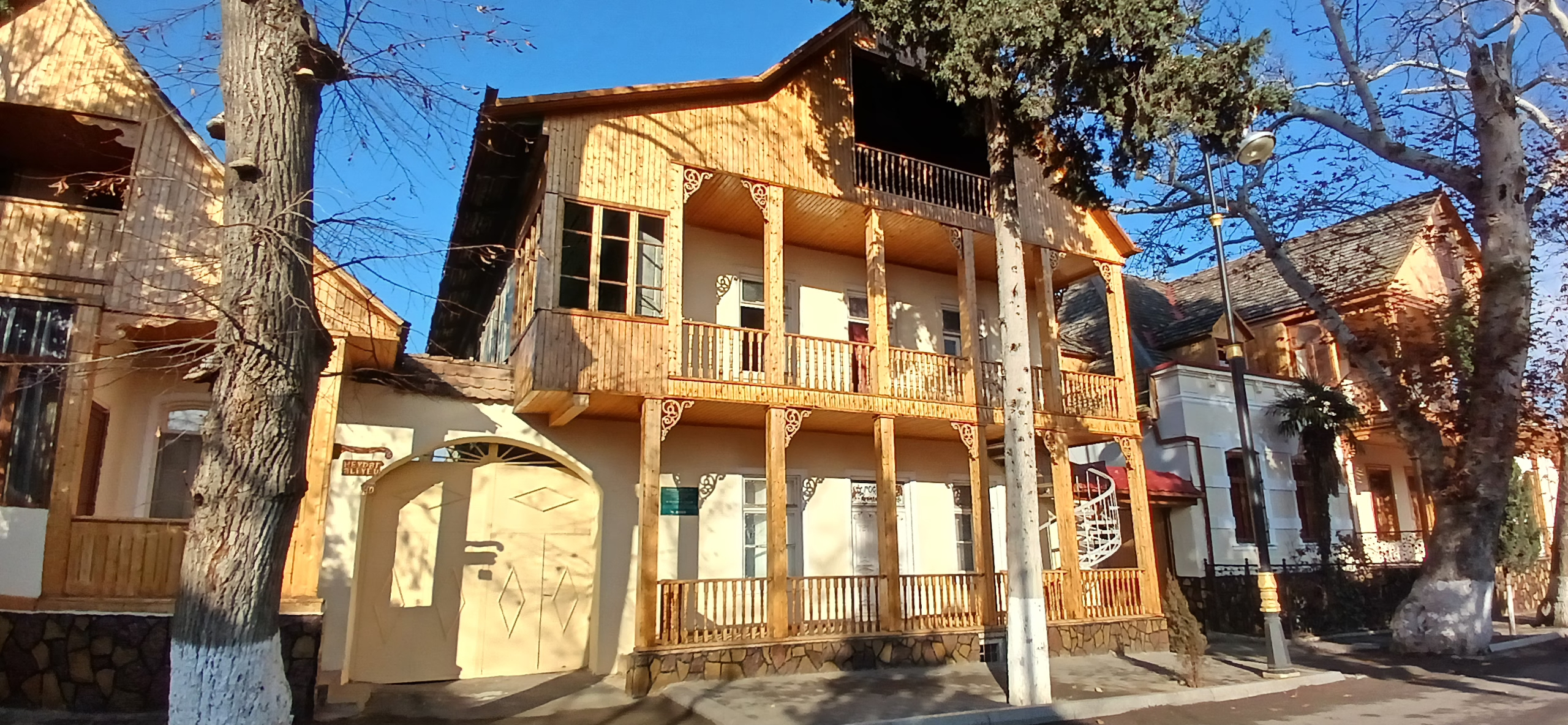
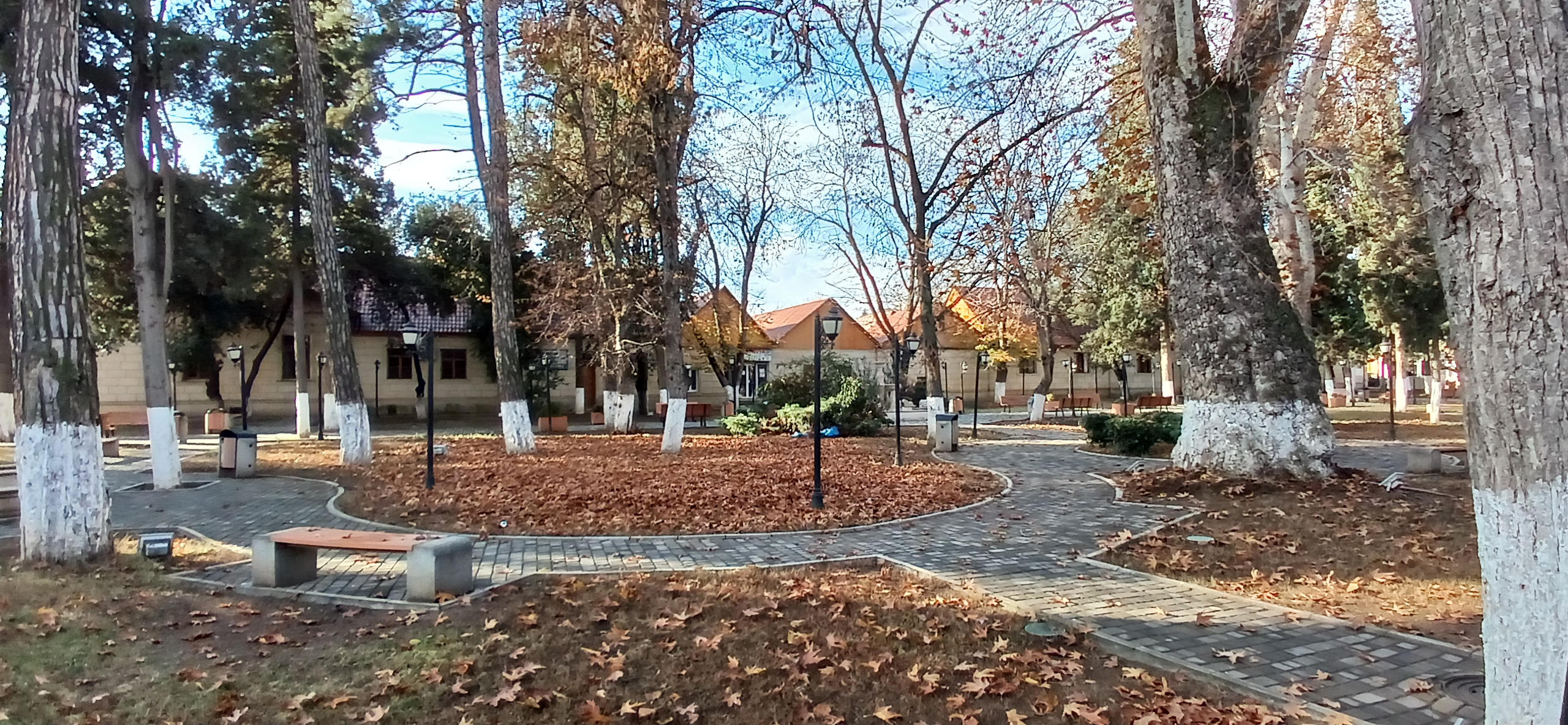
- St.John's Church, Goygol A house in German architecture A house in German architecture A house in German architecture A house in German architecture A house in German architecture A house in German architecture A park in Goygol

- Location within Azerbaijan
- Coordinates: 40°35′13″N 46°18′57″E
- Country: Azerbaijan
- District: Goygol
- Founded: 1819
- Elevation: 697 m (2,287 ft)

Population (2010)
  - Total: 37,280
- Time zone: UTC+4 (AZT)
- Area code: +994 230

Goygol (Azerbaijani: Göygöl, German: Helenendorf) (Yelenino in 1931–1938, Khanlar in 1938–2008) is a city, municipality and the capital of the Goygol District in northwestern Azerbaijan. It is around 10 km (6 mi) south of Azerbaijan's third-largest city, Ganja. The city of Goygol has a population of 37,200 (est. 2010). The municipality includes the city of Goygol and the village of Qızılqaya.

== Geography ==
=== Location ===
Goygol is situated in northwestern Azerbaijan 10 km (6 mi) south of Ganja city in the foothills of the Murovdag of the Lesser Caucasus Mountains. It is in the Kura River Basin, and the Gyandzha River (Gandzha-chay) runs through the city. A spur to Ganja connects it to the Baku-Kazakh railway, and there is a highway into Ganja.

=== Climate ===
Goygol has a humid subtropical climate (Köppen climate classification: Cfa). July is the hottest month with an average temperature of 24.2 °C (75.6 °F) and January is the coldest with an average temperature of 1.1 °C (34.0 °F). The wettest month is May with an average of 69 mm (2.7 in).

== History ==
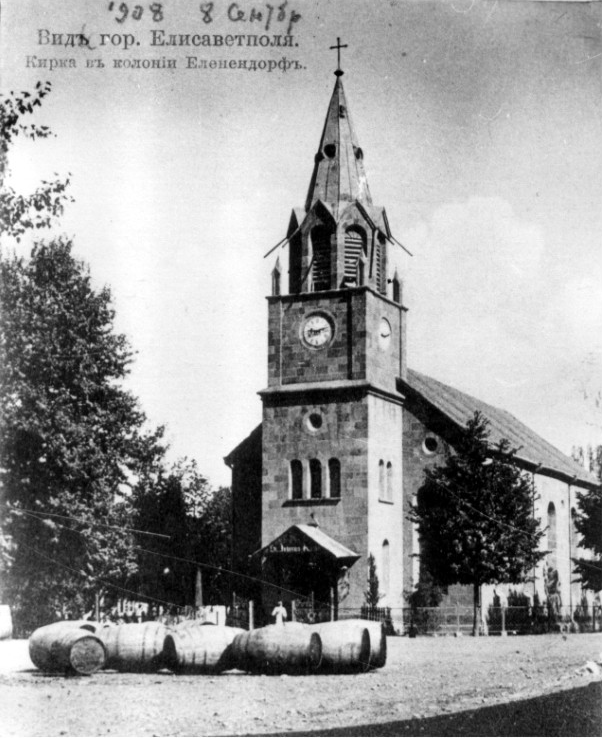
German Lutheran church, 1908

There has been a settlement at Goygol since at least the tenth century. An extensive cemetery was excavated in the 1990s, with many bronze weapons (swords, daggers, axes), some jewelry (rings, bracelets, necklaces), and clay black dishes with the geometric designs, some of which are on display at the local museum.

Under the Ganja Khanate a Tatar town on the site was known as Hanahlar. Subsequently, in 1795 it was conquered by the Qajar dynasty. It was abandoned during the Russian occupation of the area which began in 1804 and was formalised by the Treaty of Gulistan (Gyulistan Peace Treaty) in 1813.

Helenendorf was founded on the site in 1819 by Germans from Württemberg, as ordered by Czar Alexander to help settle the region. The region was known as Narimanov under the czar. In 1930 the rayon (district) was established with Helenendorf as its administrative centre.

Expropriation of the colonists property and collectivization in Helenendorf began in 1926 with the show trial of three community leaders, Gottlob Hummel, Heinrich Vohrer and Fritz Reitenbach, on charges of counter-revolutionary and nationalist activities. They were convicted, their property confiscated and they were sent to a labor camp in Kazakhstan. By 1935, over 600 German families in the area had been convicted of "espionage" and sent to labor camps.

In 1931 the town was renamed Yelenino, and in 1938 the town was renamed Khanlar, in honor of the Azerbaijani labor organizer Khanlar Safaraliyev, and the rayon also became Khanlar.

In October 1941, the remaining German population was deported to Kazakhstan, Central Asia and Siberia on Joseph Stalin's orders.

In 2008, Khanlar was renamed Goygol after the nearby lake, and the rayon became Goygol District.

=== Helenendorf ===
Helenendorf (German Helenendorf) is a German settlement founded in 1819 by settlers from Swabia in Transcaucasia (now the territory of Azerbaijan). Named in honor of the Grand Duchess Elena Pavlovna, the daughter of the Russian Emperor Paul I. In 1938, its name was changed to Khanlar and in 2008 to Goygol.

==== Establishment of the colony ====
On May 10, 1817, the Russian Emperor Alexander I signed a petition of 700 Swabian families for resettlement in Transcaucasia. The city of Ulm was appointed the assembly point, from which the settlers were sent on ships down the Danube to Izmail. After the quarantine, they were resettled for wintering in the already extant Black Sea German colonies Peterstal, Josefstal, Karlstal and other Swabian villages. The settlers arrived in Transcaucasus in August 1819, accompanied by Cossacks. Of the seven hundred families that left Ulm, only about four hundred reached their destination. Some of the settlers died on the way from illnesses, while others stayed in the Black Sea region. At the same time, about one hundred families from the Black Sea colonies joined the settlers. Six settlements in Georgia and two (Annenfeld and Elenendorf) in Azerbaijan were founded in the Transcaucasus.

The colonists arrived at the appointed place in the winter of 1818, so they were forced to winter in Elizavetpole. In the spring of 1819, during the Easter holidays, government officials determined the exact place of construction of Elenendorf – the former "Tatar settlement" Hanahlar, where "besides the half-buried canal and the pits in the ground, nothing reminded of the former inhabitants." The plots for the yards were distributed along two streets. The founders of the Helenendorf colony were 127 Swabian families (ca. 600 people), who came mainly from Reutlingen under the leadership of Gottlieb Koch, Duke Shiman, Jakov Krause and Johannes Wuhrer. Initially, the colonists had to live in dugouts. For several years they lived in very difficult and even dangerous conditions; after the first winter (1818–1819) only 118 families survived. During the Russian-Persian War of 1826–1828, the Swabians twice had to flee to Elizavetpol and Tiflis from the advancing Persians; both times Helenendorf was burned by the Persians. In 1829–1830, mortality due to diseases (including plague and cholera) was two times higher than the birth rate. Only in the 1930s did the colonists manage to gradually regain their lives.

In 1843, the population of Helendorf was 609 people, and in 1926 2,157 people (but by this time the natives of Elenendorf had founded two more colonies – Georgsfeld [936 inhabitants] and Traubenfeld [393 inhabitants]). They also moved to other subsidiary colonies, formed at the beginning of the 20th century. In October 1941, during the forced eviction of German colonists from Transcaucasia, the number of Germans living in Elenendorf and subject to eviction was 2,675 people.

==== Economic activities ====
By 1875, the colonists had fully paid the government credit (2000 rubles per family), which they received in 1818 for the relocation and arrangement of the farm. By this time, the colonists' main occupation was the cultivation of grapes and the production of spirits – various varieties of vintage and table wine, cognac, and champagne. The products produced in Elenendorf were sold by the local firms Brothers Hummel, Brothers Forehrer and Concordia not only in Russia – in particular in Moscow and St. Petersburg, but also in Europe. Crafts were also developed. By 1908, the colony numbered eight workshops for the production of horse carts (also supplied to the Russian army), six for barrels, nine forges, nine carpentry and six carpentry workshops, four sewing masters, four painters and four stoves, three locksmith workshops, and one shoe master.

==== Social development ====
The Schwabs who settled in the Russian Empire were Lutherans but belonged to the Pietistic movement, which, in fact, was one of the reasons for their resettlement to the Caucasus. In 1832 a pastor arrived from Hannover to the colony, and before that, from the time of the founding of Elenendorf, divine services, the sacraments, and rituals were conducted by a local teacher. In 1857 the stone church of St. John was built and consecrated in the village. In the 1930s, two newspapers were published in the German language, Bauer und Arbeiter and Lenins Weg.

Due to the fact that there was also a teacher among the arrivals, the children of the colonists had the opportunity to study reading, writing, and arithmetic, and later geography and history. In 1823 the first school was built, in which children were educated in two classes. As the population grew, the school expanded, and the number of subjects offered expanded. From the 1890s, it became compulsory to study the Russian language. In 1907, at the Elendendorf school, a boarding school was opened to accommodate children from other Swabian settlements of the Transcaucasus who studied there. In the 1920s, teachers from Germany were invited to work at the school. So, for example, Alois Melichar (Alois Melichar), future conductor of the Berlin Philharmonic, conducted music lessons at Elendendorf school.

The cultural life in Helenendorf began with the formation in 1893 of the German Society (Deutscher Verein), originally a male club with a library, a reading room, and a bowling alley. Later on, the amateur wind and string orchestras and theater studio were organized, which held concerts and performances in the society's hall, where up to 400 spectators could be accommodated at various festive events, including in the public garden of Helendorf. In 1930, a music school was opened with pianoforte and stringed instrument classes. Various festivals, which gathered musical groups from all the Transcaucasian colonies, were often held in Helenendorf (by the 1930s there were 21 colonies).

Traces of the German settlement can be seen in the school buildings and the parish church built in 1854.

== Demographics ==
In the 1920 census there were 2,259 people registered.

The city today is overwhelmingly populated by Azeris. Starting in 1915, the town became home to a small Assyrian community, originally from Turkey and Iran. The last resident of Goygol of German descent died in 2007. The Assyrian population consisted of three families as of 2016.

== Economy ==
A large wine machinery plant which aids in the processing of grapes is located in Goygol, as was a state-owned cattle-breeding farm as of 1990.

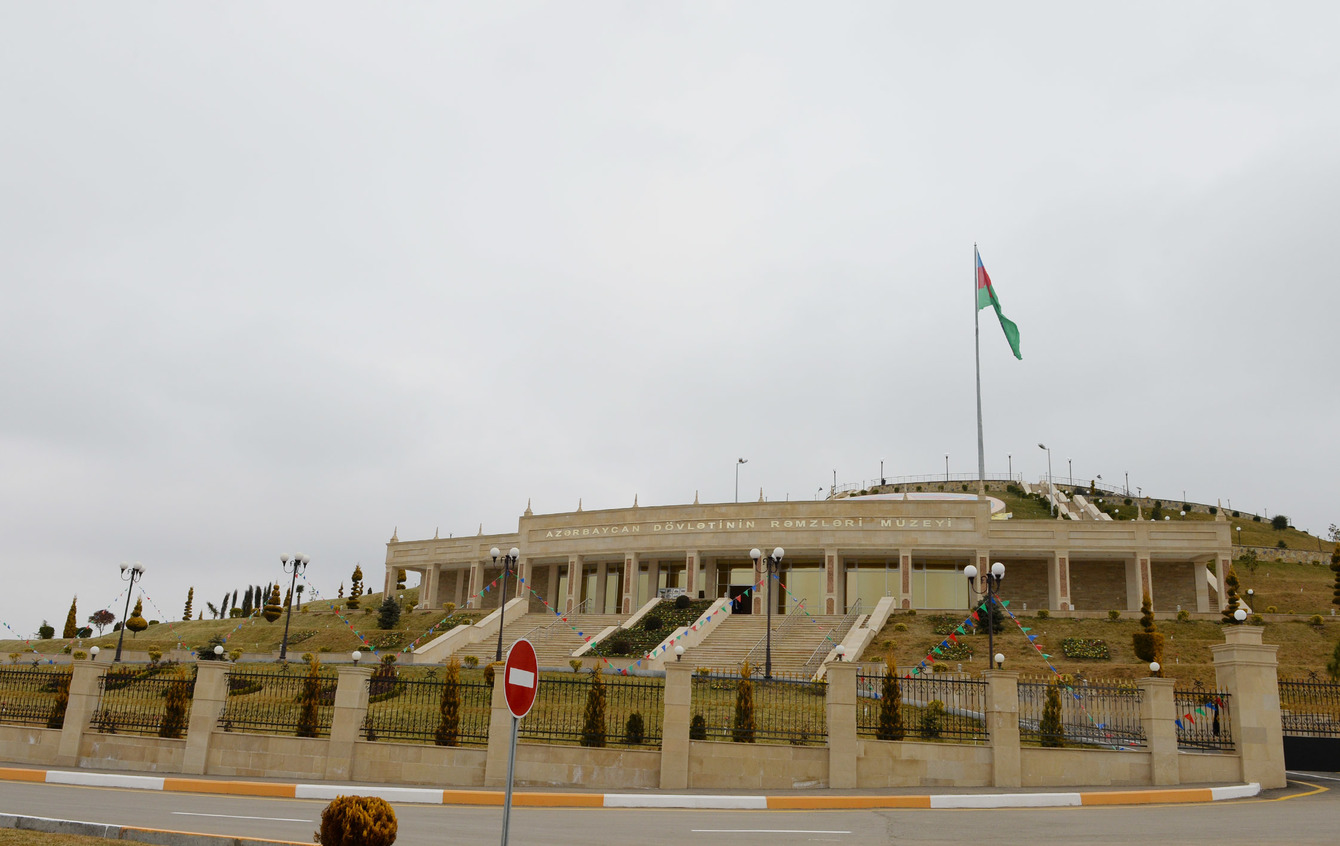
Flag Square in Goygol

== Culture ==
There are a number of historical monuments in Goygol including the Goygol Wine Factory's champagne and wine shop, Goygol Printing House, District Music School, and Koroglu Hotel dating to the 19th century, as well as the former buildings of the District Prosecutor's Office and District Police Department, which were built in the 19th century. The History-Ethnography Museum of Goygol is located in the building of the Lutheran church built in 1856 and has operated as a museum since 1982.

The State Flag Square was inaugurated in 2014 with the Flag of Azerbaijan flying at a height of 50 m (160 ft). There is also a Museum of Azerbaijan State Symbols in the square.

== See also ==
- Caucasus Germans
