= Shamkir (city) =

Shamkir Şəmkir
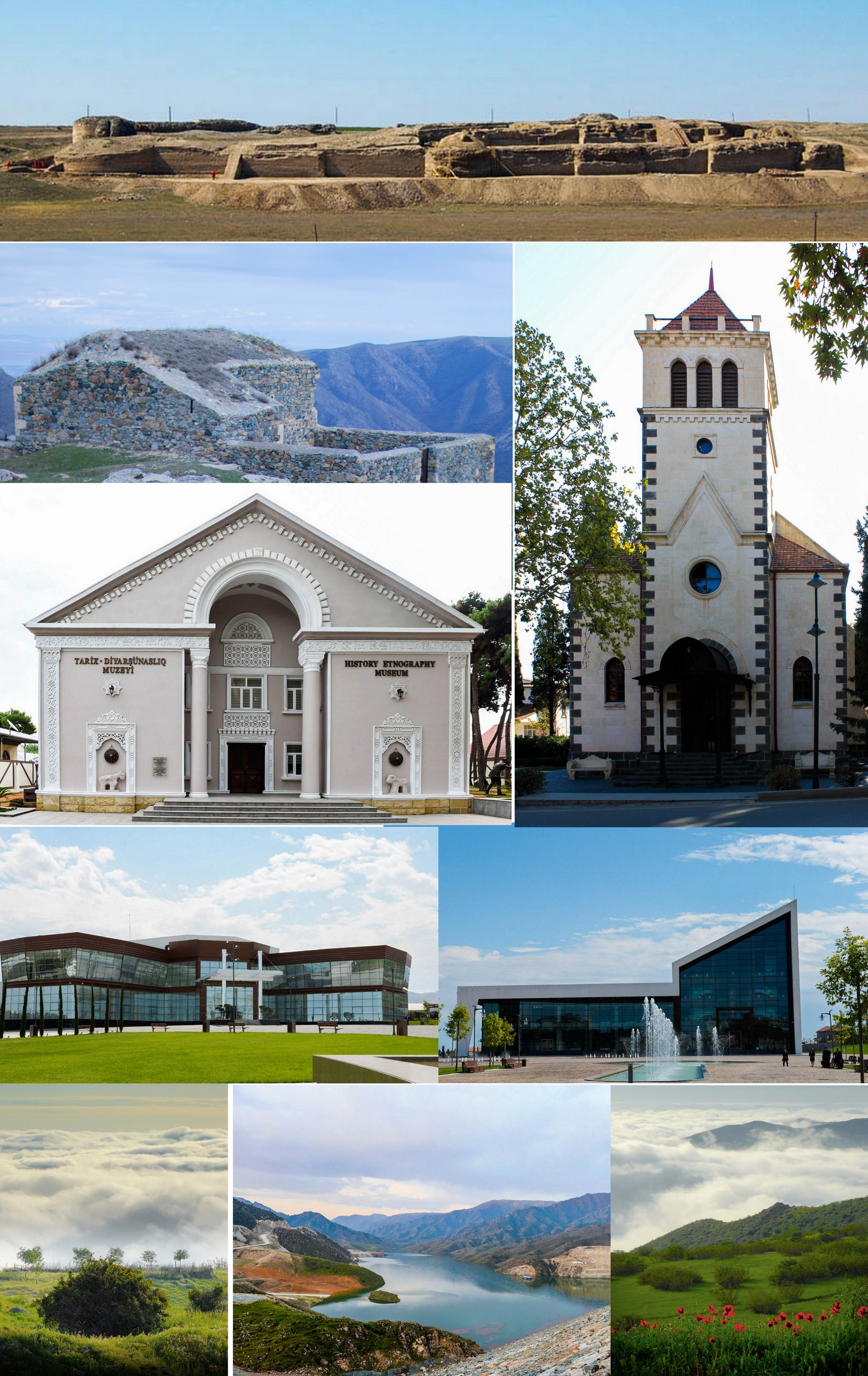

- Location within Azerbaijan
- Coordinates: 40°49′47″N 46°01′08″E
- Country: Azerbaijan
- District: Shamkir
- Founded: 1944
- Elevation: 450 m (1,480 ft)

Population (2010)
  - Total: 67,200
- Time zone: UTC+4 (AZT)
- Area code: +994 241
- Website: shamkir-ih.gov.az

Shamkir (Azerbaijani: Şəmkir), known historically as Annenfeld, is a city in and the capital of Shamkir District in western Azerbaijan, located in the northern foothills of the Lesser Caucasus, on the coast of the Chagirchay River on Tbilisi-Yevlakh highway, about 4 kilometers (2.5 mi) from Dallar railway station. It is the eighth most populous city in Azerbaijan.

== Etymology ==
One theory is that the name derives from the dialectal Azerbaijani word sham, meaning a place covered in green.

== Population ==
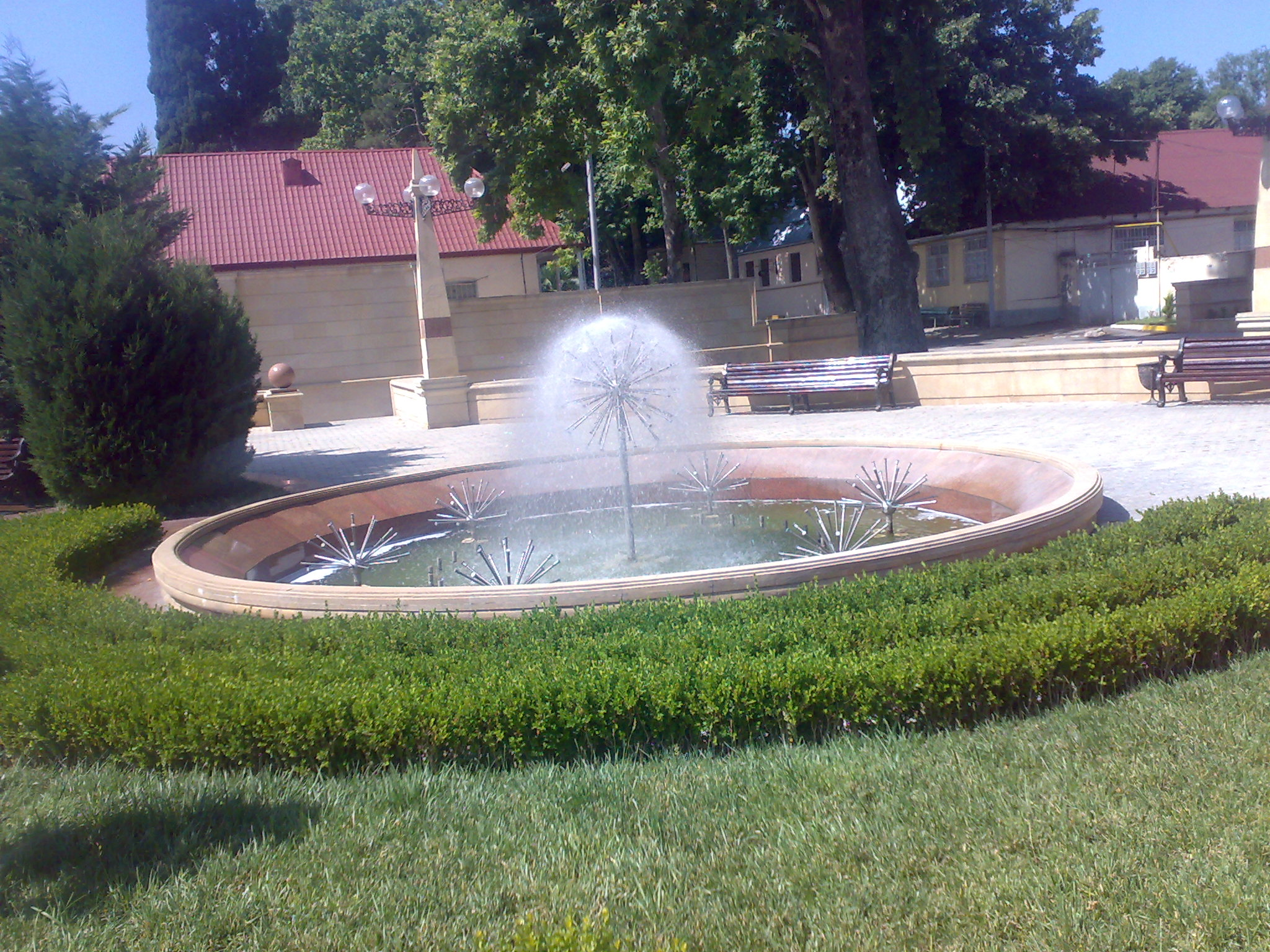
Shamkir Istiqlal park

As of October 1, 2021, the population of the region was 221,372 people.

== History ==
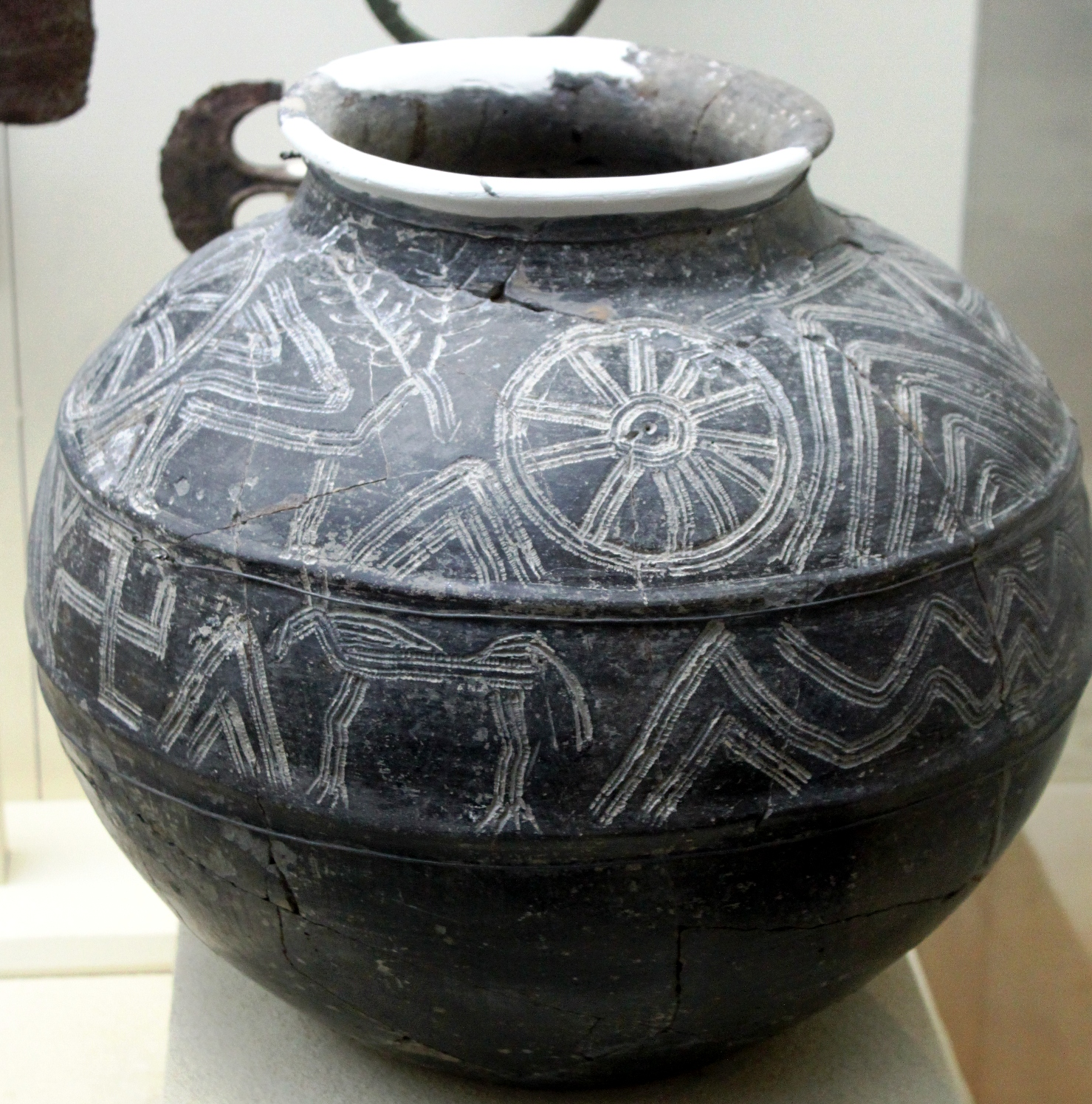
Pottery dish of the 16th or 15th century BCE, found during excavations near Shamkir

In antiquity, the territory of the modern Shamkir was part of the province of Utik, a part of the Kingdom of Armenia until 387 AD. Greco-Roman historians from the 2nd century BC to the 4th century AD state that Utik was a province of Armenia, with the Kura River separating Armenia and Caucasian Albania.

The historical Shamkur (also known as Shamkhor and Shamkir) has been known since the 5th century as a merchant and craft center of Persia. In 652, the city was seized by Arabs. In 737, Khazars settled in Shamkir after the Arabian commander Mervan's campaign to the Volga. In 752, the city was destroyed by the Sabir people, who lived nearby and rebelled against the Arabs. In 854, the Muslim Khazars took refuge in Shamkir. Later, the city was under the reign of Ganja amirs from the Kurdish dynasty of Shaddadids. In the 12th century and in the beginning of the 13th century, Shamkir was under the Georgian reign. In 1195, the Georgian Queen Tamar's commanders destroyed the troops of Azerbaijan's Atabey Abu-Bakr, who was from Seljuk dynasty of the Ildegizids. In 1235, Shamkir was destroyed by Mongols. From the first quarter of the 16th century till the beginning of the 19th century Shamkir was governed by hereditary rulers a Turkic tribe called Shamsaddinli-Zulgadar. In 1803, during the military actions against the Ganja Khanate of Qajar Iran, Shamkir was taken up by Russian troops and annexed to Russia.

In 1817–1818, a colony of Germans resettled from Württemberg, was established on the site of Shamkir under the name Annenfeld. There were also other Germans in Azerbaijan besides those associated with the colony. On September 3, 1826, during the Russo-Persian War, the Persian Army under Commond Prince Mohammad consisting of 10,000 soldiers was destroyed near Annenfeld. In 1915, Assyrians from Turkey and Iran were resettled here and still lived here as of the 1930s.

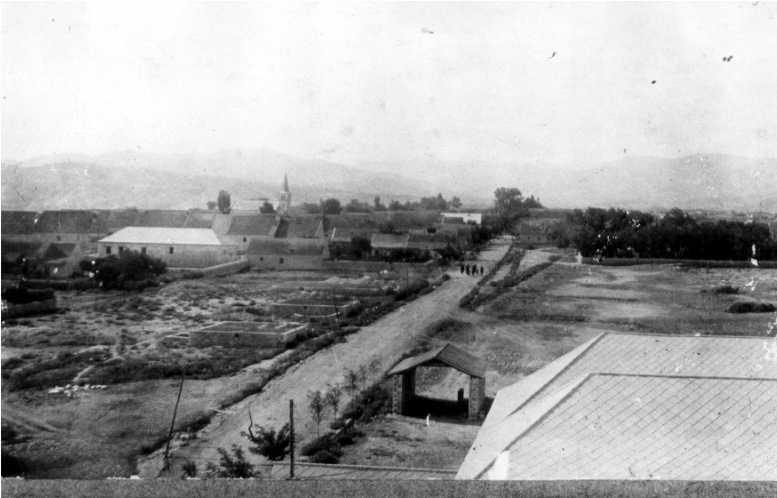
Annenfeld in the early 20th century

Following World War I, Annenfeld was given the Russian name of Annino (Russian: Аннино). In 1938, it was granted urban-type settlement and renamed Shamkhor (Шамхор), after the nearby railway station and the historical Shamkir. In 1944, two years after the German population was deported as part of the population transfer in the Soviet Union, it was granted town status. In 1991, the name was changed to Shamkir.

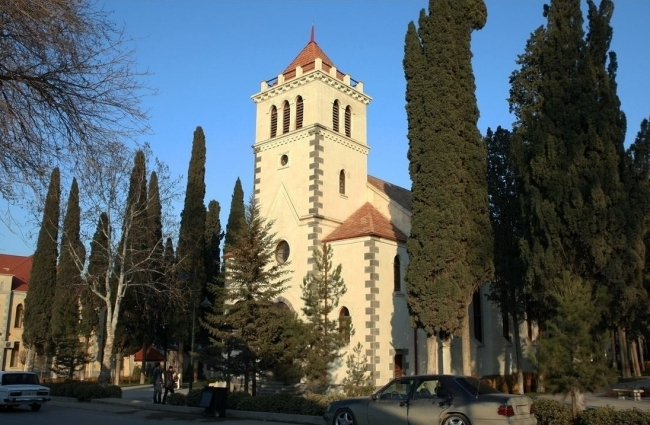
Lutheran German Church

== Economy ==
There are cognac and wine plants and also a plant of local industry functioning in the city.

=== Transportation ===
==== Public transport ====
Shamkir has a large urban transport system, mostly managed by the Ministry of Transportation.

== Sports ==
The city has one professional football team, Shamkir, currently competing in the second-flight of Azerbaijani football, the Azerbaijan First Division. The club has two Azerbaijani league titles.

As of 2014, city's home of Shamkir Chess a category 22 event and one of the highest rated tournaments of all time.

== Notable people ==
Some of the city's many prestigious residents include: poets Molla Vali Vidadi and Ahmad Javad, footballers Javid Imamverdiyev, Kalin Stepanyan, and archer Zinyat Valiyeva.

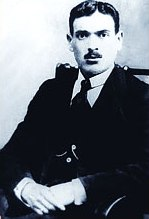
Ahmad Javad, is known for writings lyrics of Azerbaijan national anthem

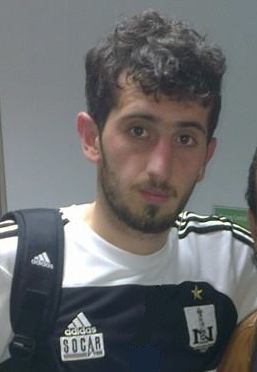
Javid Imamverdiyev, footballer.

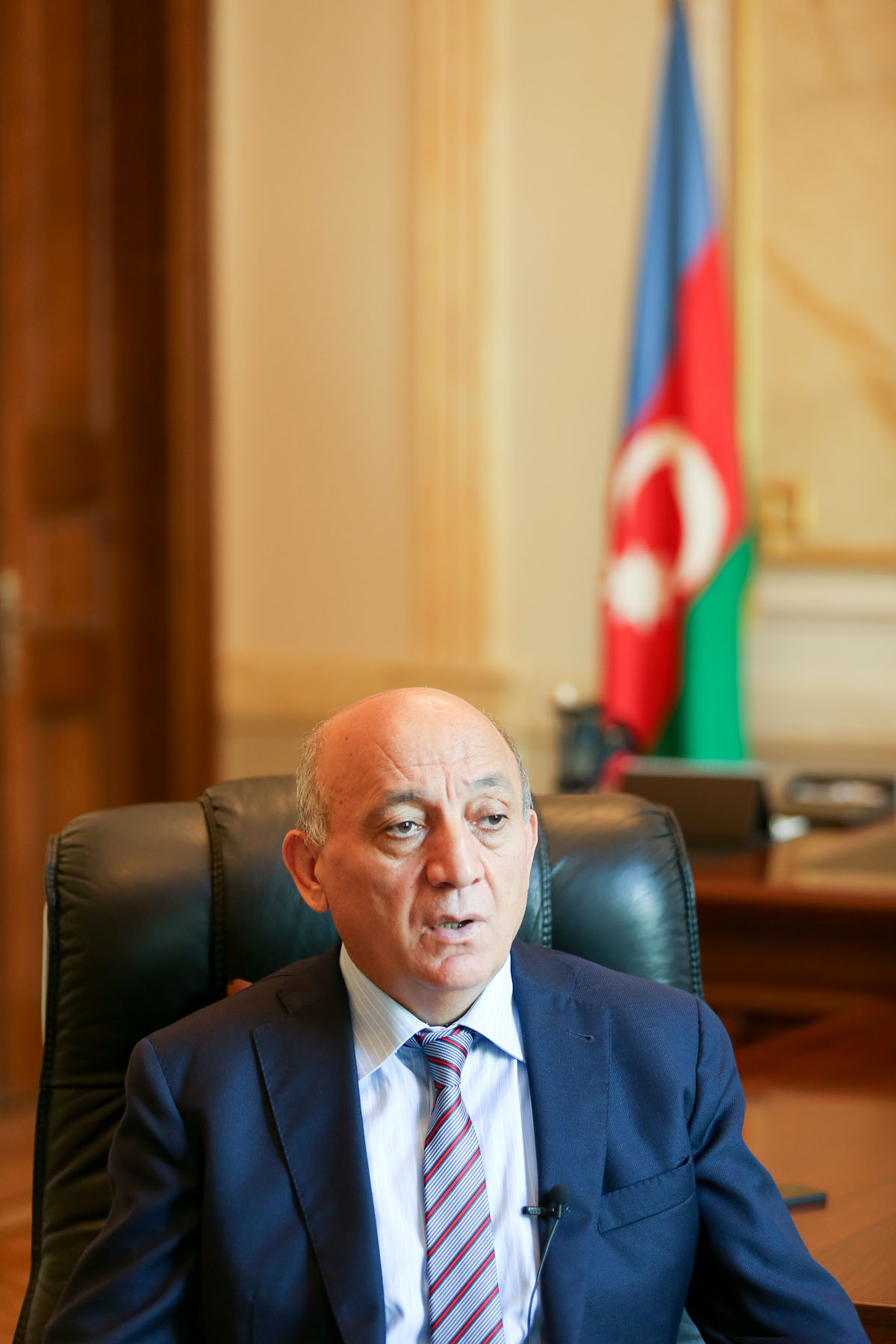
Mubariz Gurbanli, Chairman to the State Committee on Religious Associations of the Republic of Azerbaijan
