= Mahmudlu, Shamkir =

Mahmudlu
- Municipality
- Location within Azerbaijan
- Coordinates: 40°51′05″N 46°09′25″E
- Country: Azerbaijan
- Rayon: Shamkir

Population
  - Total: 3,252
- Time zone: UTC+4 (AZT)
  - Summer (DST): UTC+5 (AZT)

Mahmudlu is a village and municipality in the Shamkir Rayon of Azerbaijan. It has a population of 3,252.

== History ==
Mahmudlu village is located in the North-West of Azerbaijan in Shamkir district, 21 kilometers from the center of the district, on the right bank of the Shamkir river, on the Ganja-Gazakh plain. The population is 3259 people (as at 1 January 2005). The economy is based on animal husbandry, crop production, vineculture and horticulture. The village has a high school, a club, a library, a medical center, an ancient cemetery, a bridge, a monument to the martyrs, several artesians, various commercial and domestic facilities. The village has historically consisted of nine small tribes madmudlu, mashadigurbanli, kelbali, allakululi, gazakhli, yekenamazli, pusteli, yarakhmedli, gadzhymamedli. During the collectivization of the twentieth century, these tribes were moved to one place, and the settlement was named after the mahmudlu tribe. There was a time when this village was impenetrable jungle. Representatives of the Turkic-speaking of Mahmudlu tribe arrived in Azerbaijan at different times. The sources also referred to the inhabitants of Mahmudlu, who spend their winter in Nagorno-Karabakh and summer in Zangezur. Mahmudli people living in the East of lake Van in Turkey, came to the Caucasus in the XVI-XVII centuries, including in Azerbaijan. Don Juan of Persia named mahmudlu tribe in 25th place in the list of gizilbash tribes and their branches. There are also Mahmudlu villages in Jabrail, Fuzuli and Gubadli districts. In the Zangezur district of Ganja (now Gafan district), Mahmudlu village was abandoned (in 1988 its population was expelled).

== Population ==
The population of the village is 3,376, of which 1,786 are men and 1,590 are women.

=== Notable people ===
Mubariz Gurbanli - Chairman to the State Committee on Religious Associations of the Republic of Azerbaijan

== Economy ==
The main economy is animal husbandry and agriculture. Also there is the company "Vitamin VIO" located in this village.

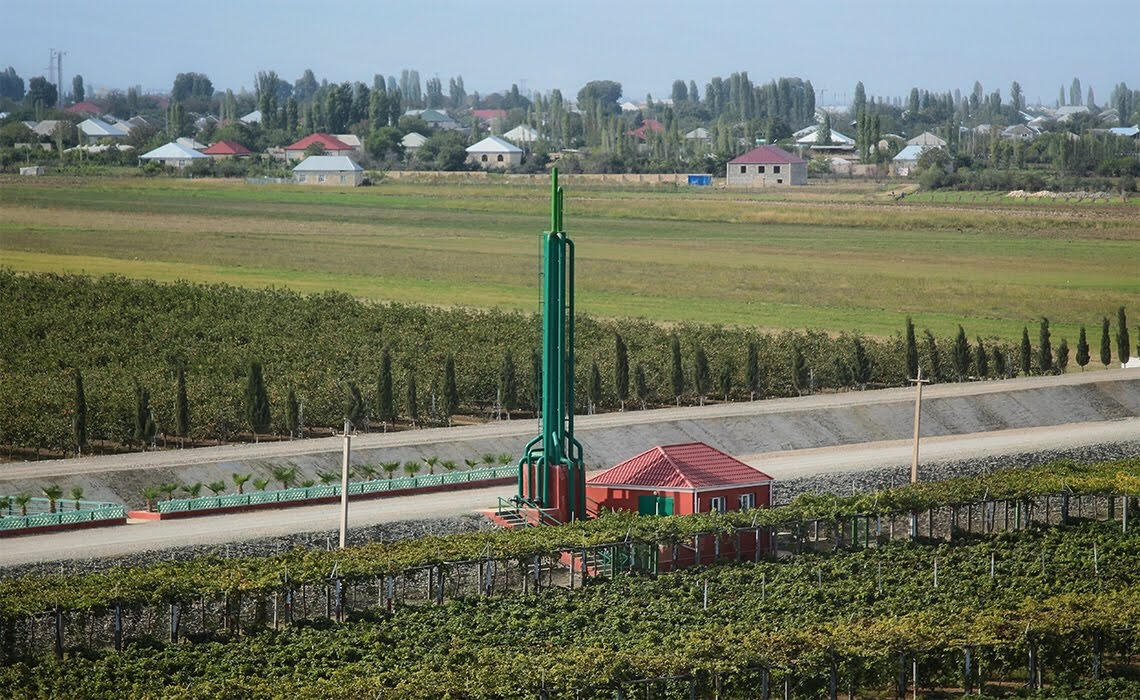
Vitamin VIO
