= Secularism in Azerbaijan =

Azerbaijan is a secular state by law. The Constitution states, "religious associations shall be separate from the state and shall not interfere in state affairs."

== Background ==
Azerbaijan has an estimated population of approximately 10.4 million. Nearly 96 percent of the population is Muslim, out of which 65% is Shia and 35% is Sunni. The remaining four percent of the population consists of atheists, Armenian Apostolics, Baha’is, Catholics, Georgian Orthodox, members of the International Society for Krishna Consciousness, Jehovah's Witnesses, Jews, Molokans, Protestants, and Russian Orthodox.

== Regulations on Muslims ==
According to the 2024 report from the US Department of State, the government of Azerbaijan routinely harassed, fined, surveilled, detained, arrested, and imprisoned Shia Muslims related to their religious activities and religious activism. On December 29, 2023, the State Department placed Azerbaijan on its Special Watch List for severe violations of religious freedom. The government uses mosque closures to repress independent Muslim groups that act independently of the state. Clerics that act in ways objectionable to the state face dismissal and arrest. The government does not restrict religious conversion, but it does forbid proselytizing. Azerbaijan is often considered the most secularized Muslim-majority nation.

In September 2026, Azerbaijan introduced a change to its school dress code that, in practice, keeps the hijab out of classrooms. The amendment—formally titled the "Descriptions of Uniforms for Students of State General Education Institutions"—does not name the hijab directly. Instead, it prohibits clothing that the government considers incompatible with the country's "principle of secularism." The state-run Azerbaijani Press Agency (APA) described the move as a way to create a consistent dress code rooted in Azerbaijan's secular identity.

This development sits against a striking demographic backdrop: roughly 96 percent of Azerbaijan's population is Muslim. The constitution calls the country secular, yet it also promises religious freedom. According to the APA, students and teachers may still wear garments that reflect the "history, culture, and national and moral values of the Azerbaijani people," provided the Pedagogical Council approves them. The agency argued that such clothing supports teachers' "professional standards" and enhances the "school's public reputation."

== Persecution of Armenian Christians ==
The recent invasion of Nagorno-Karabakh in 2023 lead to a large scale exodus of Armenian Christians to Armenia. Over 100 churches were reportedly destroyed. The Armenian government accused Azerbaijan of ethnic cleansing. In 2024, the US government added Azerbaijan to a watchlist of religious freedom following the Azerbaijani invasion of Armenian enclave.

== See also ==
- Religion in Azerbaijan
- Irreligion in Azerbaijan
- Freedom of religion in Azerbaijan
