= Shia Crescent =

Region in the Middle East

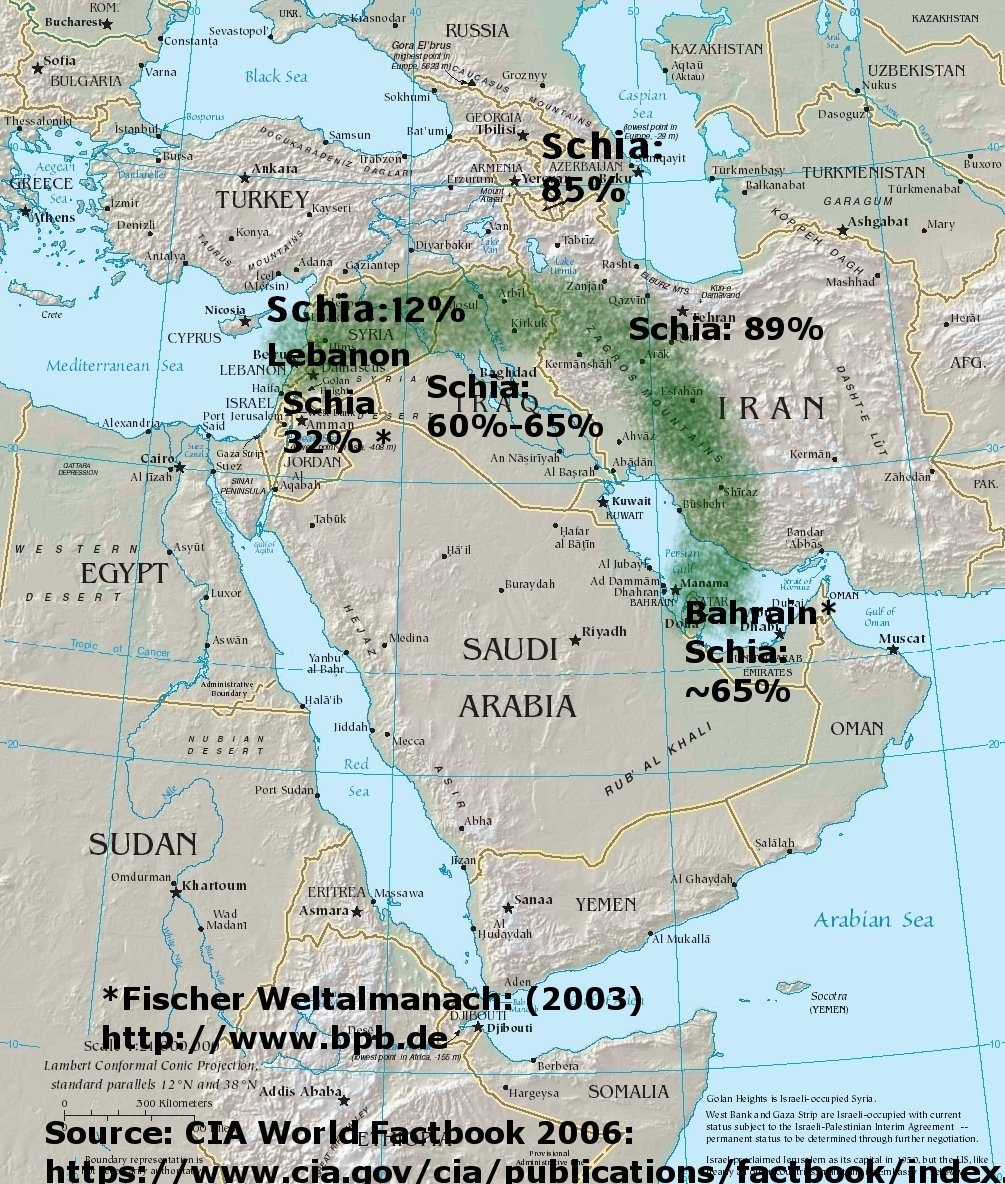
A 2003 map of the Shia Crescent.

The Shia Crescent is the notionally crescent-shaped region of the West Asia where the majority population is Shia or where there is a strong Shia minority in the population.

In recent years the term has been used in Western political discourse to identify areas under Iranian influence or control and soft power, as Iran has sought to unite all Shia Muslims under one banner. On the other hand, this concept shows the increasing political weight of Shia in Western Asia.

Areas in the Shia Crescent include Lebanon, Syria (west Syria), Bahrain, Iraq (south Iraq), and Iran. In addition to the Twelver Shia, the term also included Ismaili, Zaydi in Yemen, Alawi groups in Syria and Alevi groups in Turkey. After the Assad regime was overthrown by the Sunni opposition on 8 December 2024, Syria was no longer dominated by Iran and its allies, and the remnants of the former regime launched sporadic insurgency in the western coastal areas.

== Overview ==
If it was a Shia-led Iraq that had a special relationship with Iran, and you look at that relationship with Syria and with Hezbollah-Lebanon, then we have this new crescent that appears that would be very destabilising for the Gulf countries and actually for the whole region.

— Abdullah II of Jordan, Hardball, NBC News.

The term was coined in 2004 by King Abdullah II of Jordan at a time when Iran was reportedly interfering in Iraq in the run-up to the January 2005 parliamentary elections. This was in the context of a threatened, later realised, boycott of the elections by Sunnis in Iraq potentially leading to a Shia-dominated government and the assumption that a Shia Iraq might fall under the influence of Shia Iran. The suggestion was that the common religion gives good potential for cooperation between Iran, Iraq, Alawite-dominated Syria and the politically powerful Shia militia Hezbollah in Lebanon; as well, the suggestion was that these others would be proxies for Iran in a regional power play.

The term has developed since to encompass other Shia areas of the Middle East. The nations where Shia Muslims form a dominant majority are Iran and Iraq. Shias also represent a large majority in Azerbaijan, however it is constitutionally a secular state. Those who are actual practicing adherents are much lower, which has led to them generally being excluded from the crescent.

Shia Muslims represent the majority of citizens and the 70% of the population in Bahrain. Large Shia minorities exist in Lebanon, Kuwait, Yemen, Saudi Arabia, Turkey, Afghanistan, Pakistan, India and to a lesser extent, UAE. Excepting Lebanon, where the weak central government structure of Lebanon allowed Hezbollah to become involved in the Syrian civil war, these are not usually described as part of the crescent.

In June 2005, Ayatollah Khamenei, the Supreme Leader of the Islamic Republic of Iran, in a speech on the anniversary of Ayatollah Khomeini's death, cited the "Shia Crescent" project as evidence of a policy of religious divisiveness. In December 2015, at the 29th International Islamic Unity Conference in Tehran, Iranian President Hassan Rouhani called on Muslim countries to unite and strive to improve Islam's public image, adding that "There is neither a Shiite nor a Sunni crescent. We have an Islamic moon. We, Muslims, are in a world where we must be united".

In 2012, Noam Chomsky, an American university professor and linguist, in his book, Making the Future: Occupations, Interventions, Empire and Resistance, claims that most of the Middle East's energy reserves lie in the so-called "Shiite Crescent" Iran's influence in the Shiite Crescent challenges US efforts to control Middle East energy resources. Washington's nightmare is for a Shiite coalition to take control of the world's most important oil reserves independently of the United States.

In January 2016, a confidant of Saudi Crown Prince Mohammad bin Salman claimed that the Arab world was confronted "by a Shia full moon”, rather than just a Shia Crescent, as a result of the expanded activities of Iranian-backed Shia militias in countries such as Iraq, Syria and Yemen. In December 2017, Mohammad Ali Jafari, the chief of the Islamic Revolutionary Guard Corps (IRGC), said that "Today, armed cells of resistance have been established in Islamic countries, and small networks of resistance have been created in other countries, and we will see their influence in the future.” According to him, large forces of volunteers have joined the "anti-terror" struggle in Syria. Jafari had previously talked about the regime's need to create a Shia Islamist bloc loyal to Iran.

In 2014, Qods Force Chief Qassem Suleimani outlined Ali Khamenei's strategy of toppling the Arab governments, through military insurgencies waged by Iran-backed Khomeinist militants. Explaining that Iran's goal was to occupy "70 percent of the world's oil", Suleimani stated:

"The revival of Shia under the leadership of Iran creates a polarity and power for Iran, which has a political dimension and also a security dimension and also an economic dimension .... We know that three countries Iran, Saudi Arabia, and Iraq contain the most oil in the world. [Saudi] Arabia is first, Iran and Iraq are second and third, and that approximately 70 percent of the worlds oil is located where the Shia live or about 80 percent is where the Shia live. Iraq's oil is in this corridor between Basra and Baghdad; Kuwait, and [Saudi] Arabia, which 80 percent of its oil is located in the Shia-populated places like Damam [and] Qatif, and it is also clear for Iran. The political leadership of Shiism exponentially adds to Iran's ethnic power."

In 2024, the collapse of the Assad family-led Syrian regime has plunged Iran’s strategy, established since the 1979 Islamic Revolution to consolidate regional influence, into a deep crisis. This strategy aimed to create a sphere of influence stretching from Iraq to the Mediterranean, exert pressure on Sunni Muslim states, and solidify Iran’s position as a regional power.

== Demographic transformations and Shiization ==
In 2016, Hussain Ibrahim Qutrib, an associate professor of geomorphology at the King Faisal Center for Research and Islamic Studies, wrote an article about the demographic changes that have occurred in "Useful Syria" as a result of the Syrian Civil War. Specifically, Qutrib defined "Useful Syria" similar to how Syrian President Bashar al-Assad defined this term in early 2016—as in, including the Syrian governorates of Damascus, Rif Dimashq, Homs, Hama, Latakia, and Tartus.

Qutrib pointed out that these six governorates contained 46% of Syria's total population at the end of 2011— 9.8 million people out of a Syrian population of almost 21.4 million people at the time. Qutrib points out that, at the end of 2011, the demographics of "Useful Syria" were 69% Sunni, 21% Alawite (which is an offshoot of Shi'a Islam), 1% Shi'a, 1% Druze, 2% Ismaili, and 6% Christian.

By 2016, the population of "Useful Syria" fell from 9.8 million to 7.6 million. Syria's demographics changed significantly in the intervening five years. In 2016, "Useful Syria" was just 52% Sunni, 24% Alawite, 13% Shi'a, 1% Druze, 3% Ismaili, and 7% Christian—with the main change being the explosive growth of the Shi'a population in "Useful Syria" between 2011 and 2016.

The demographic transformations in Rif Dimashq and Homs governorate between 2011 and 2016 were especially notable: Rif Dimashq went from 87% Sunni in 2011 to 54% Sunni in 2016. The Homs governorate went from 64% Sunni to 21% Sunni between 2011 and 2016. This demographic transformation has been described by Qutrib as Shiization.

== See also ==
Shia topics

- Iran–Saudi Arabia proxy conflict
- Axis of Resistance
- Shia–Sunni relations
- Shia Islam § Demographics (for current estimates of Shia proportion of population)

Geography topics

- Fertile Crescent
- Mesopotamia
