= Sheikh Sardar Hajjihasanli =

Sheikh Sardar Hajjihasаnli
- Şeyx Sərdar Hacıhəsənli
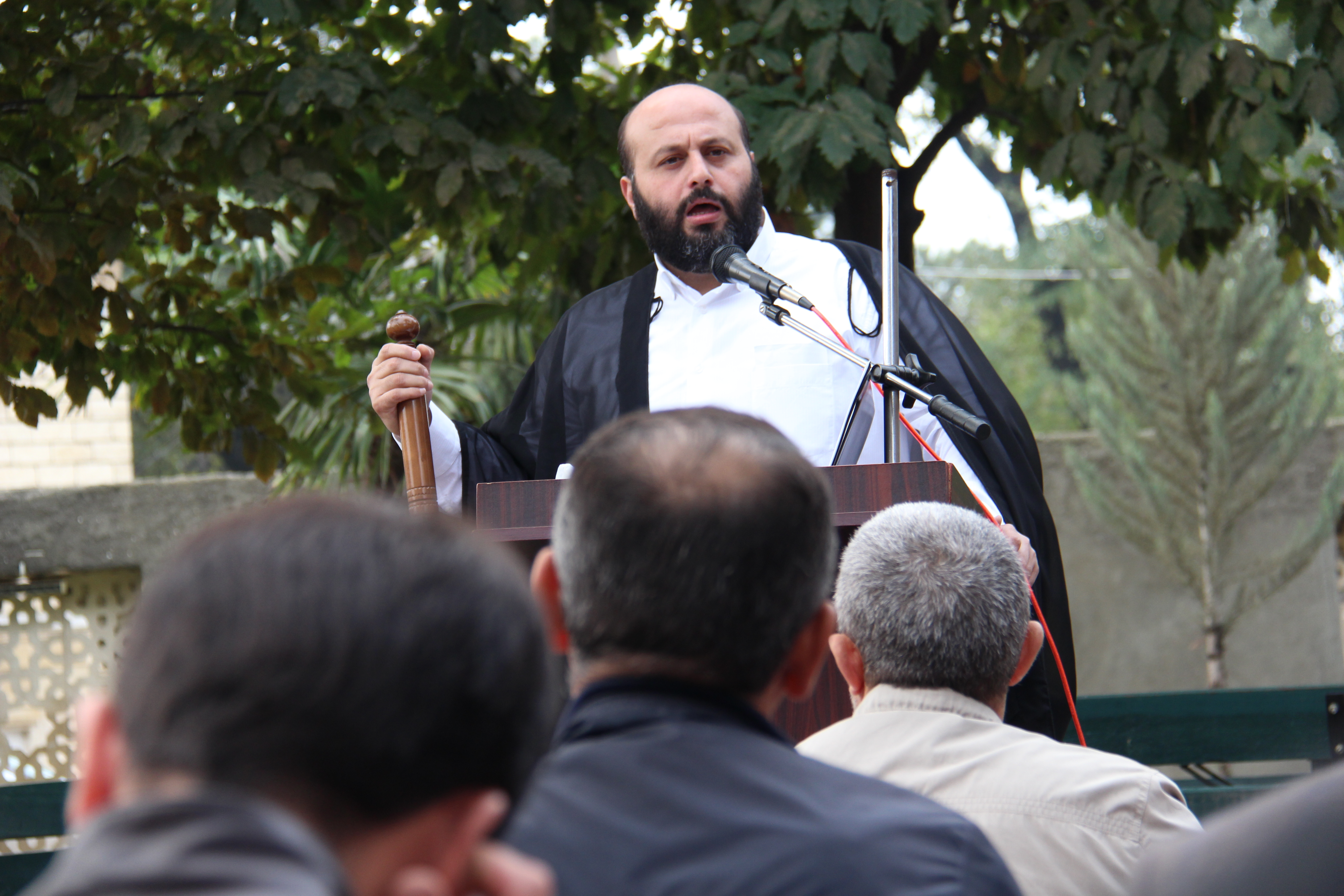
- Born: Sardar Akif oglu Babayev; March 12, 1974 (age 52); Masally District, Azerbaijan SSR
- Other names: Sheikh Sardar
- Citizenship: Azerbaijan SSR —> Azerbaijan
- Education: Al-Mustafa International University
- Children: 3

Sheikh Sardar Hajjihasanli (Azerbaijani: Şeyx Sərdar Hacıhəsənli) or Sardar Akif oglu Babayev (Azerbaijani: Sərdar Akif oğlu Babayev) is an Azerbaijani cleric, religious figure, member of the Azerbaijani Cleric Association, founder and editor-in-chief of Maide.az news website, expert and researcher of Islamic Studies.

== Biography ==
Sardar Babayev Akif was born on March 12, 1974, in Masally District in Azerbaijan SSR of the Soviet Union.

Brought up in one of Masally's noble families, Sardar went to school at the age of seven and during the collapse of the Union of Soviet Socialist Republics got secondary education at the Masally District school.

He is the 5th child among 6 children of the late Mashhadi Akif. He was interested in religion and religious studies from childhood. Along with school classes, he participated in Quran teaching and religion classes during the period of the Soviet Union.

In his youth he began to learn the religious issues from the local theologians.

He started to propagandize religious teachings in Masally and its vicinity when he was 15–16 years old. Taking into account the people's request, Sardar in the months of Ramadan, Muharram and Safar read three or even four sermons per day and conducted religious rites.

At the age of 15 he was able to hold religious meetings and was a great preacher in his town.

He was such a great preacher that received lots of invitations from people in the cities and villages. To support religious ceremonies, the young cleric traveled to various places and sometimes far lands during the month of Ramadan and the mourning of Muharram (the anniversary of the Battle of Karbala, when Imam Hussein, the grandson of Muhammad, was killed by the forces of the second Umayyad caliph) for preaching and teaching religious issues to people.

As there were few clerics and a lot of invitations to the religious ceremonies, Sheikh conducted the service sometimes 4 times a day.

Despite being well known and popular among people he was always seeking to get knowledge. To gain more knowledge in Islamic teachings he went to one of the great scholars of that time, Hujjatul-Islam Molla Beilar. Sardar could attract his favorite teacher's attention and after a while he turned into one of the trusted students of Molla Beilar. Sheikh Sardar's extraordinary talent and intelligence made the teacher, despite his great interest in him, to send him to Qom – the Center for Islamic Teachings.

He learned primary Islamic teachings from Molla Beilar and it was the time to learn more from great teachers . He was encouraged by Molla Beilar to move to Qom, and in 1992 he left for Qom.

He went to the Qom Seminary. He passed his primary level in the Seminary of Qom in a short period of time. Then, he got the chance to meet with great scholars of Qom including Ayatullah Javadi Amoli, Ayatullah Mazaheri and Ayatullah Meshkini and joining their classes. He also joined classes of ethics by Ayatullah Ahmadi Miyanaji besides seminary classes. He also was one of the students of Ayatullah Bahjat.

After 10 years, Hujjatul-Islam Haj Sheikh Sardar left Qom and became the professor of the Islamic University of Iran in Kyrgyzstan, in Bishkek in 2000. He later went to the Kazakh Foreign Languages University in Almaty as lecturer. His compatriots from Azerbaijan, who were displaced from their own lands and were exiled to Almaty in early 20th century after the establishment of the communist regime came to meet with him.

Thus, Sheikh began to propagandize Islam in Central Asia along with teaching at the university.

He was involved not only in religious issues of Shias, but he had lectures in Sunni's mosques, teaching recitation of Quran and interpretation of Quran.

Sheikh Sardar's carrier in Middle Asia last for 8 years. He was so popular among people in the region.

In the former Soviet Union, and even in Iran and Turkey he was known as a real cleric, who is honest. He had many followers in different areas. Despite the great number of invitations from his followers from the former Soviet Union and Shia communities, especially from the big cities of Russia, he decided to return to his country, the Azerbaijan Republic.

After returning to Azerbaijan, upon the invitation by the representative of Association of Muslims of Caucasus in the south of the country, Sheikh Sardar began his religious career as a Friday prayer leader in Masally mosque.

He launched his news website, Maide.az in 2014 to promote the teachings of Ahlulbayt and the Quran with the help of a group of scholars, professors and students of the Seminary.

In his career, he has always focused on education and paid great attention to the interest of the nation and people. Using the power of his words, he has always struggled against social degradation, people's problems and abnormalities of human societies to develop human-Islamic values in society.

Using the weapon of logic in defense of Islam's privacy and the interests of Muslims, Sheikh Sardar has devoted himself to Islam and Muslims.

He has always condemned any religious slurs, plots against Islam and Muslims, or oppression.

Hujjatul-Islam Hajj Sheikh Sardar Hajjhasanli is a member of the Union of the Azerbaijani Clerics, and a member of the General Assembly of Ahlul-Bayt World Assembly. He is married and has three children.

In 2009, he went to Mecca for pilgrimage, and also visited the shrines of infallible Imams several times.

Charged with holding Friday Prayer and giving Sermons, Sheikh Sardar is now in a prison near Baku.

== Arrest and Trial ==
The Masally court sentenced Sheikh Sardar to a month and 7 days imprisonment on February 22, 2017. Sheikh Sardar's lawyer was not allowed to attend the trial. He was arrested upon the complain of Rafil Huseynov, the head of the executive power of Masally, and was charged with violation of the requirements of holding religious propaganda and carrying out religious ceremonies under the article 168.1.3 of the Criminal Code of the Azerbaijan Republic. Finally, he was sentenced to 3 years in prison on July 3, 2017.

Sheikh Sardar's lawyers made an appeal at the court in July 2017 in Baku. According to the appeal of Javad Javadov, one of Sheikh Sardar's lawyers, we demand the acquittal of Sheikh Sardar because of the lack of any crime in his actions. "At the same time, we are considering the protocol and will voice our remarks this week," Javadov added. The Court of Appeal of Shirvan city reviewed the Masally court's verdict on extension of the period of Sheikh Sardar's detention on April 6, 2017.

Lawyer Javadov said that people voiced their protests to the police by blocking the way to the court. He said: "The police again tried to prevent me to enter the court building, but they changed their decision after they understood that the trial would not start without the lawyer." During the trial the court upheld the verdict and decided to keep Sheikh Sardar Babayev in custody.

A hearing was held at the Supreme Court on February 13, 2018 to consider an appeal against the arrest of Sheikh Sardar Hajjihasanli (Babayev). The trial was held by Judge Gulzar Rzayeva, with participation of Sheikh Sardar Hajjihasanli, his lawyer, Javad Javadov, as well as media representatives, political and social figures. None of the petitions filed by the lawyer was accepted by the court. In the court, Sheikh Sardar called himself innocent, and claimed that he was arrested illegally, and said: “None of the truthful petitions filed by lawyers from the day of detention until today was granted at all courts,” Sheikh Sardar said. “I have been told that I have been arrested for holding Friday Prayer and giving Sermons,” Sheikh Sardar said. “As during the previous trials, I don’t expect anything from this trial, because I don’t understand the reason of my detention,” he said. “Sometimes they say that I am charged with holding Friday prayer, giving sermons or studying abroad," he said. "Maybe I wouldn't be arrested if I had given sermons propagandizing idolatry or immorality!" Hajjihasanlı emphasized that investigation and trials were not held in accordance with the legal requirements. "Just imagine, the testimony of the witnesses in the court and during the investigation differ," he said. "The judge not only does not pay attention to the testimony and statements of the witnesses, but ask them leading questions." The judge interrupted Sheikh Sardar's speech and, after consultation, upheld the verdict of the Court of Appeal of Shirvan city.

The European Court of Human Rights has begun to hear a lawsuit by Sheikh Sardar Hajjihasanli in September 2018. The court has begun the communication process. The court raised questions to the Azerbaijani government about the violations of the European Convention on Human Rights in connection with Sheikh Sardar's case. The European Court of Human Rights, referring to the violations of Articles of European Convention on Human Rights (Prohibition of Torture), 5.1, 5.3 and 5.4 (right to liberty and immunity), 6.2 (the principle of exclusion), 9 (freedom of thought, conscience and religion), 10 (freedom of speech) 11 (right to freedom of assemblies and associations), 14 (prevention of discrimination) called on the Azerbaijani government to explain this issue.

The Azerbaijani clerics, the Union of the Azerbaijani Clerics, the Union of Writers Ghalam, the Islamic Party of Azerbaijan, the Center for the Protection of Freedom in Religion and Conscience (DEVAMM), the World Assembly of the Ahlulbayt (AS), Azerbaijani social figures, and other organizations and individuals condemned Sheikh Sardar's arrest, and declared the court verdict unlawful.

Released in February 2020.

Sheikh Sardar Hajihasanli was detained by the State Security Service (SSS) officers on October 19, 2021. On October 21 he was accused under Clause 274 of the Criminal Code - "High Treason" and Sabail District Court adjudged him to six months of imprisonment. He did not admit his guilt. Same year, on October 27 court proceedings of the appeal against his arrest decision were held. As per the decision of the Baku Court of Appeal the appeal claim was not satisfied.

On April 14, 2022, by the decision of the Sabail District Court, the period of detention of theologian Sardar Babayev (Hajigasanli) during the investigation period was extended for another 5 months, until September 19, 2022.

== Articles ==
- "`YENƏ HƏMİN XƏTDİR, HƏMİN KOORDİNAT`" (in Azerbaijani). maide.az. June 7, 2013. Archived from the original on January 13, 2019.
- "Bizi öz ünvanımızla mühakimə edin!" (in Azerbaijani). maide.az. June 7, 2013. Archived from the original on January 13, 2019.
- "Silahımız əqidəmiz, dayağımız Rəbbimizdir!" (in Azerbaijani). maide.az. June 7, 2013. Archived from the original on January 13, 2019.
- "Quran və Ziyalı" (in Azerbaijani). maide.az. June 7, 2013. Archived from the original on January 13, 2019.

== See also ==
- Freedom of religion in Azerbaijan
- Islam in Azerbaijan
