= Hidayat Orujov =

Azerbaijani politician (1944–2026)

- Hidayət Orucov
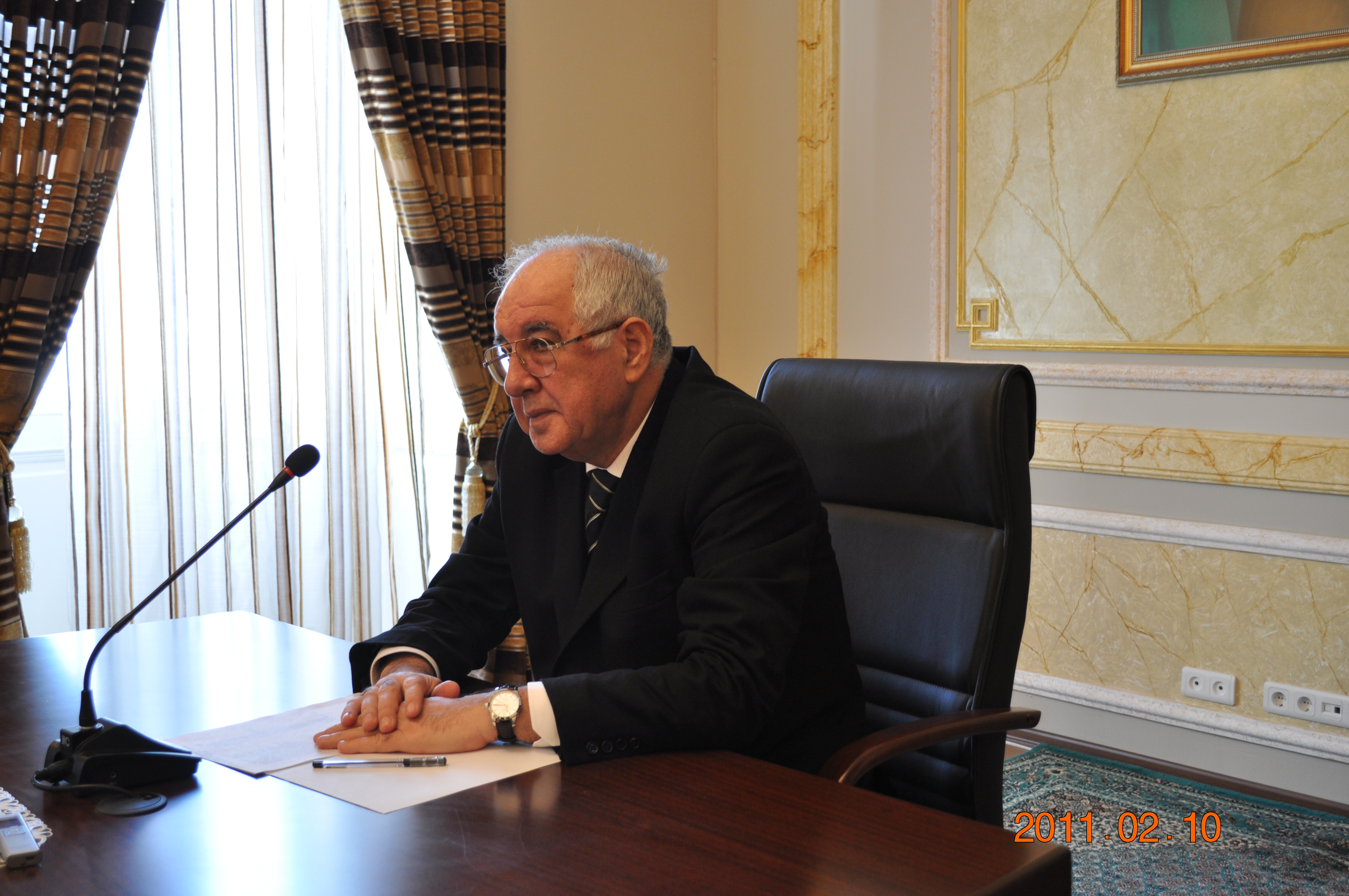
- Orujov in 2011

Chairman of State Committee for Work with Religious Organizations
- In office 27 June 2006 – 31 May 2012
- President: Ilham Aliyev
- Preceded by: Rafig Aliyev
- Succeeded by: Elshad Iskandarov

Personal details
- Born: 5 September 1944 Maralzami, Syunik Region, Armenian SSR, Soviet Union
- Died: 13 June 2026 (aged 81) Istanbul, Turkey

Hidayat Khudush oglu Orujov (Azerbaijani: Hidayət Xuduş oğlu Orucov; 5 September 1944 – 13 June 2026) was an Azerbaijani writer and politician. He became the Chairman of State Committee for Work with Religious Organizations of Azerbaijan Republic in 2006 and later served as the Azerbaijani ambassador to Kyrgyzstan.

== Early life ==
Orujov was born on 5 September 1944, in Maralzami village of Syunik Region, Armenian SSR. He graduated from the philology department of Azerbaijan State University. After graduation, he worked as a teacher in his village and for Soviet Armenia newspaper for a brief period of time, and in July 1968 he was appointed the Director of the Jaffar Jabbarli Iravan State Azerbaijan Drama Theater where he worked for 6 years.

As a writer he was known under alias Hidayet. Orujov also headed the Azerbaijani literature Council of the Writers Union of Armenia and taught Azerbaijani Literature of 19–20th centuries at Armenian State Pedagogical University. He's credited with publishing numerous books on Azerbaijani and Oghuz literature in Yerevan. Orujov has translated numerous books by Armenian authors such as H.Paronyan, V.Petrosyan, K.Sarkisyan, K.Arshakyan from Armenian into Azerbaijani and Russian. In March 1984, he moved to Baku and was hired as the Assistant Editor of Gənclik (Youth) Publishing House and in March 1986, he was appointed the Chief Editor of the publishing house, a position which he held until 1992. While an editor, he substantially expanded the library of books on Azerbaijan in international markets. A fifteen volume Azerbaijani folklore, twenty five volume Adventures and Mystics, seventeen volume Literature of nations of USSR were published under Orujov's leadership. Orujov has also been board member of Azerbaijani Writer's Union and Literature newspaper.

== Political career ==
In 1992–1993, Orujov served as the State Advisor on Interethnic Relations to the President of Azerbaijan. From 1993 to 2006, he was the State Advisor on National Policies; in 2005–2006, he served as the State Advisor on Ethnic Minorities and Religious Organizations to the President of Azerbaijan. On 27 June 2006, he was appointed the Chairman of the State Committee for Work with Religious Organizations of Azerbaijan Republic, replacing Dr. Rafig Aliyev. As the chairman of the state committee, he paid special attention to preventing registrations of religious organizations allegedly being recommended by foreign special services. Hidayat Orujov was appointed the Ambassador of Azerbaijan to the Kyrgyz Republic in December 2012.

== Death ==
Orujov died on 13 June 2026, at the age of 81.

== Works and awards ==
Orujov was awarded the Honorable Arts Contributor of Armenian SSR award in 1978, Order for Personal Courage in 1970, and was honored with awards from the Supreme Soviet of Azerbaijan SSR. In 1989, after Armenians laid claims on the Karabakh region of Azerbaijan, Orujov renounced his award from the Armenian SSR. Since the independence of Azerbaijan was restored, he has also been awarded the Shohrat Order and For service to the Fatherland Order of Azerbaijan Republic, International Paydulla Iskeyev Literature Award of Chuvash Republic and a number of awards from Georgia and Dagestan.

== See also ==
- Cabinet of Azerbaijan
- Azerbaijani literature
