= Mubariz Gurbanli =

Chairman to the State Committee on Religious Associations of the Republic of Azerbaijan

Mubariz Gurbanli Mübariz Qurbanlı
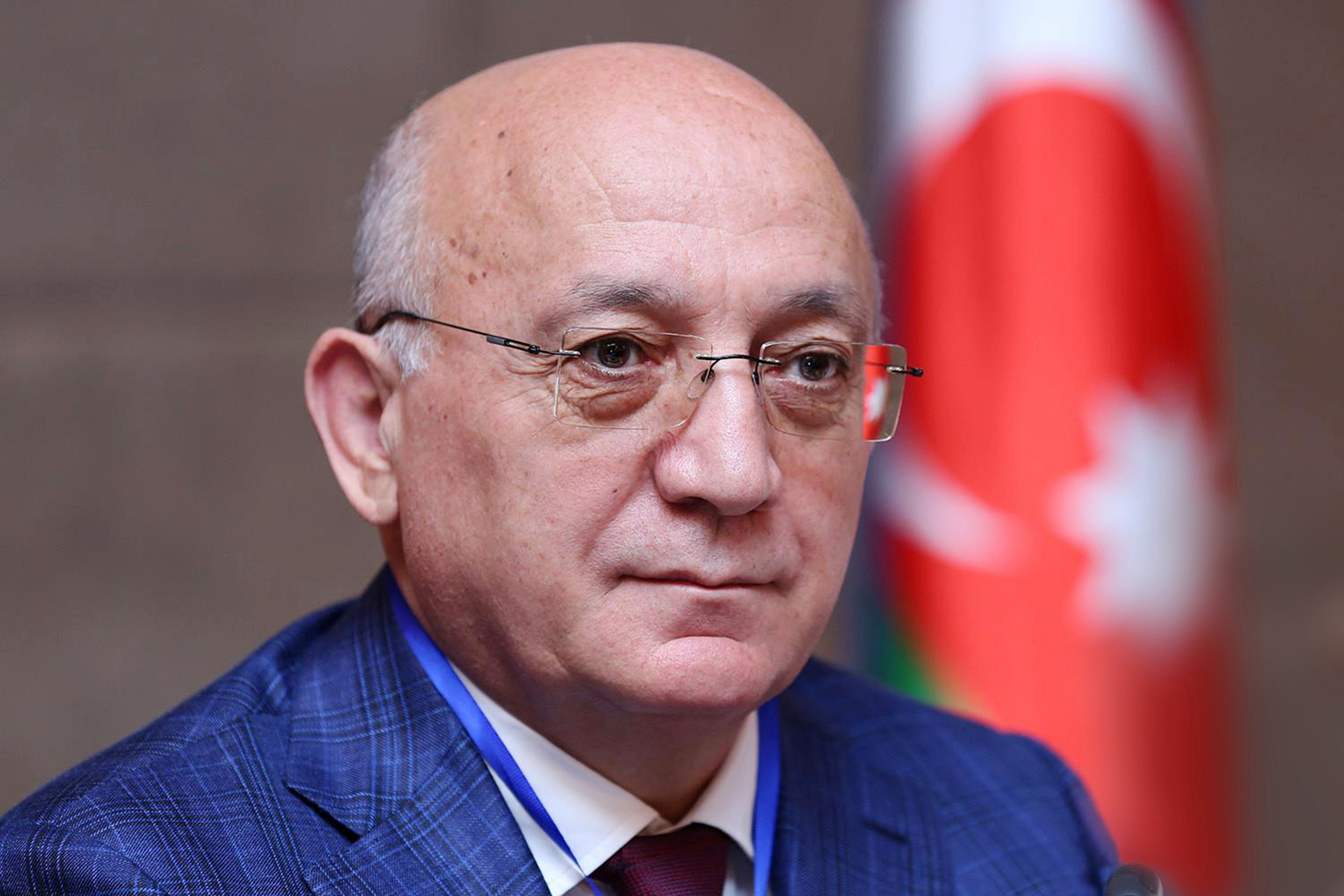

Chairman to the State Committee on Religious Associations of the Republic of Azerbaijan
- In office 21 July 2014 – 14 February 2024
- President: Ilham Aliyev
- Preceded by: Elshad Isgandarov
- Succeeded by: Ramin Mammadov

Speaker of the National Assembly of Azerbaijan
- In office 1995 – 2014; 2024 -

Personal details
- Born: 7 January 1954 (age 72) Shamkir, Koltehneli, Shamkir
- Party: New Azerbaijan Party
- Awards: Shohrat Order (Azerbaijan)

Mubariz Gahraman oghlu Gurbanli was Chair of the State Committee on Religious Associations of the Republic of Azerbaijan from 2014 to 2024.

== Biography ==
Mubariz Gurbanli was born in Koltehneli, Shamkir village, district of Shamkir, 7 January 1954.

Graduated with honors from the History Department of the Baku State University; PhD in History; associate professor.

In 1978, secondary school teacher at Koltehneli, Shamkir village of Shamkir district.

In 1985, he was lecturer, senior lecturer, associate professor, Head of chair, and vice-rector at the Azerbaijan State University of Culture and Arts; currently is an associate professor of the university.

From 1995-2010, he was elected to four Milli Mejlis terms of the Republic of Azerbaijan. Member of the Standing Commission of the Milli Mejlis on Legal Policy and State Building Affairs; Head of the working group on interparliamentary relations between Azerbaijan-Bosnia and Herzegovina; member of the working groups on interparliamentary relations between Azerbaijan-Canada, and Azerbaijan-Kuwait.

In 1996-2014, Member of the delegation of Azerbaijan to the parliamentary Assembly of the Black Sea Economic Cooperation Organization, and Deputy Committee chairperson. Member of the Political Council of New Azerbaijan Party and Deputy Executive Secretary of the New Azerbaijan Party.

2014, he was awarded with the Order of Glory for active participation in the public and political life of the Republic of Azerbaijan by the Decree dated 7 January 2014 of the President of the Republic of Azerbaijan.

He was appointed Chairman of the State Committee on Religious Associations of the Republic of Azerbaijan by the Decree dated 21 July 2014 of the President of the Republic of Azerbaijan.

Since 27 December 2018, he has been Chairman of the Board of Trustees of the Azerbaijan Institute of Theology.

At the 7th Congress of the New Azerbaijan Party (5 March 2021), he was elected a member of the YAP Board.

In the 2024 parliamentary elections in Azerbaijan, held on September 1, he won in the Samukh-Shamkir electoral district No. 101. He was officially elected as a deputy of the Milli Majlis of Azerbaijan for the seventh term, whose first session took place on September 23, 2024.

== Personal life ==
Mubariz Gurbanli is married, with two children.

== Awards ==
- Shohrat Order (Azerbaijan) (06.01.2014)
- 2nd class "For Service to the Fatherland" Order (07.01.2024)

== See also ==
- Cabinet of Azerbaijan
