= Irreligion in Azerbaijan =

Irreligion in Azerbaijan is open to interpretation according to differing censuses and polls. Although Islam is the predominant faith in Azerbaijan, religious affiliation is nominal in Azerbaijan and percentages for actual practicing adherents are much lower. It is difficult to quantify the number of irreligious persons in Azerbaijan as they are not officially counted in the census of the country. It is the most secular Muslim country in the world.

== Research and statistics ==
In a study conducted by the Caucasus Research Resource Centers, in 2010, 2,001 people were interviewed, of which 28% answered that religion was "a highly important" part of their life. Two years later, the survey was conducted again, with 1,829 respondents, of which 33% reported that religion was "a highly important" part of their life. Another 44% considered religion to be a "rather important" part of their daily lives. Out of that combined 77%, 2% attended religious services every day, 3% once a week or more and twenty percent fasted, but rarely. About half never follows it.

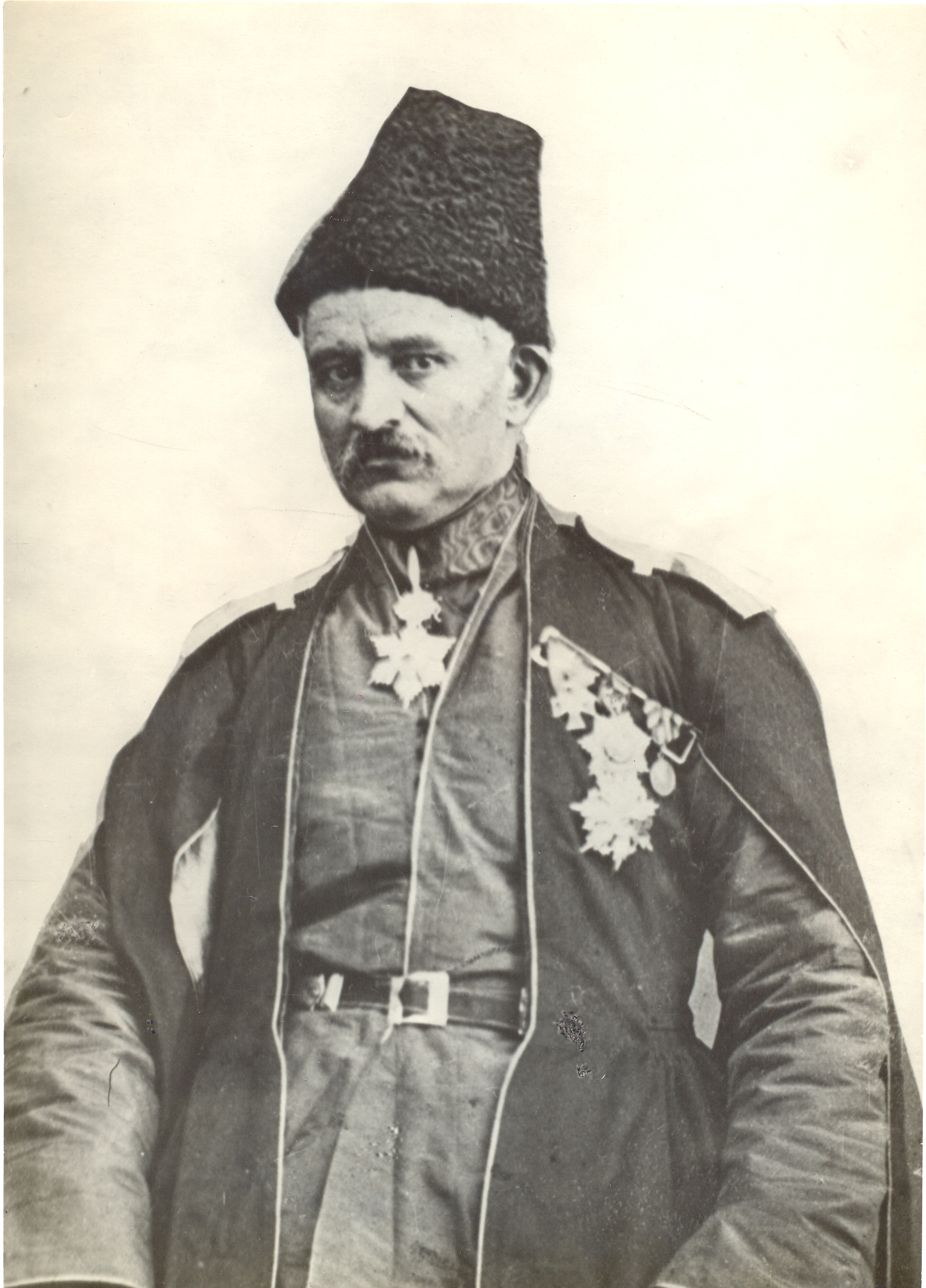
Mirza Fatali Akhundov, 19th century Azerbaijani modernist and father of the atheist movement in Azerbaijan

According to a recent 2013 Gallup Poll, Azerbaijan is one of the most Secular countries in the Muslim world, with about 53% of respondents indicating the importance of religion in their life as little or none. The same poll indicates that only 20% of the respondents has attended on religious services. Gallup International indicated that only 34% of Azerbaijanis who took the poll adhere to religious practices, and ranked Azerbaijan the 13th least religious country from data compiled in 2005, 2008 and 2015.

In 2012, as part of the World Value Survey, there was conducted a comparative analysis of countries on the importance of religion in people's lives. The poll was conducted on a scale from zero to one, where the zero mark meant that religion is "not at all important", and the one mark was "extremely important". According to the results of this survey, the index of Azerbaijan was 0.52 and took 33rd place out of 80 participating countries.

According to the journal named "Caucasus & Globalization", the number of religious people participating in the survey was 62.7%, and very religious - 6.4%. 10.6% of the respondents found it difficult to answer. The poll also asked about the importance of religion in everyday life, which was answered by the respondents as follows: for 11% it plays a very important role, for 25.7% - an important role, for 41% - moderate, for others it either plays an insignificant role, or does not play any role at all.

In 2005 another poll was conducted, which revealed that 87% of the population of 12 regions of Azerbaijan consider themselves religious, while about 10% believe that they are religious rather than atheists, and only 1% say that they are atheists.

According to the Pew Research Center, according to the results of the study, 99.4% of the population are Muslims. The same research center reported in 2010 that 96.9% of the population is Muslim, and less than 1% of people do not consider themselves as affiliated to any of the religions.

According to Crabtree, Pelham (2009), Azerbaijan is in the list of 11 least religious countries in the world with only 21% people saying that religion is an important part of their life.

== 20th century ==
In 1920, the Azerbaijan Democratic Republic disintegrated and in 1922 became part of the USSR. Since in the USSR atheism was an important part of the state ideology, Azerbaijan was also subjected to the influence of the authorities in relation to religion. At that time mosques were being destroyed - thus, by 1933 only 33 mosques were functioning. In 1967 the Museum of the History of Atheism was created, which after the collapse of the USSR was renamed the State Museum of the History of Religion.

The population of Azerbaijan due to persecution and the threat of life had to hide its religious views. This "prudent concealment of faith" is permitted in the Qur'an and is only a temporary and formal denial of faith. However, the period of temporary rejection of faith lasted from 1922 until 1991, when Azerbaijan regained its independence. Near 70 years of forced abandonment of faith played a role in the further perception of religiosity on the part of the population.

== See also ==
- Religion in Azerbaijan
- Freedom of religion in Azerbaijan
- Islam in Azerbaijan
- Cultural Muslims
- Christianity in Azerbaijan
- Demographics of Azerbaijan
- Rafiq Tağı, Azeri humanist writer who was assassinated for publishing his views on Islam.
