= Elshad Isgandarov =

Azerbaijani politician

Elshad Isgandarov Elşad İsgəndərov

Chairman of State Committee for Work with Religious Organizations of Azerbaijan Republic
- In office May 31, 2012 – May 2, 2014
- President: Ilham Aliyev
- Preceded by: Hidayat Orujov
- Succeeded by: Mubariz Gurbanli

Personal details
- Born: May 21, 1972 (age 53) Baku

Elshad Isgandarov (Azerbaijani: Elşad Hüseyn oğlu İsgəndərov; born May 21, 1972) - Azerbaijani politician, former Chairman of State Committee for Work with Religious Organizations of Azerbaijan Republic.

Elshad Isgandarov was born on May 21, 1972, in Baku. He graduated from the faculty of History of Baku State University with honor in 1993. He received an MA degree in international affairs from Columbia University, US (2002-2004).

In 1993-1995, he was editor of the History journal of the Azerbaijan National Academy of Sciences. In 1995, he was one of the co-founders of the National Assembly of Youth Organizations of the Republic of Azerbaijan. Later, he was deputy chairman of the National Assembly. From 1999, he worked at the Ministry of Foreign Affairs of the Republic of Azerbaijan. In 2000-2005, he was the First Secretary at the Permanent Mission of the Republic of Azerbaijan to the UN. In March 2009, he received the rank of Ambassador Extraordinary and Plenipotentiary under the decree of the President of the Republic of Azerbaijan. On May 31, 2012, Amb. Iskandarov was appointed Chairman of the State Committee on Religious Associations of the Republic of Azerbaijan.

== See also ==
- Cabinet of Azerbaijan
