= Ramin Mammadov =

Azerbaijani politician (born 1979)

Ramin Mammadov Ramin Alamshah oglu Mammadov
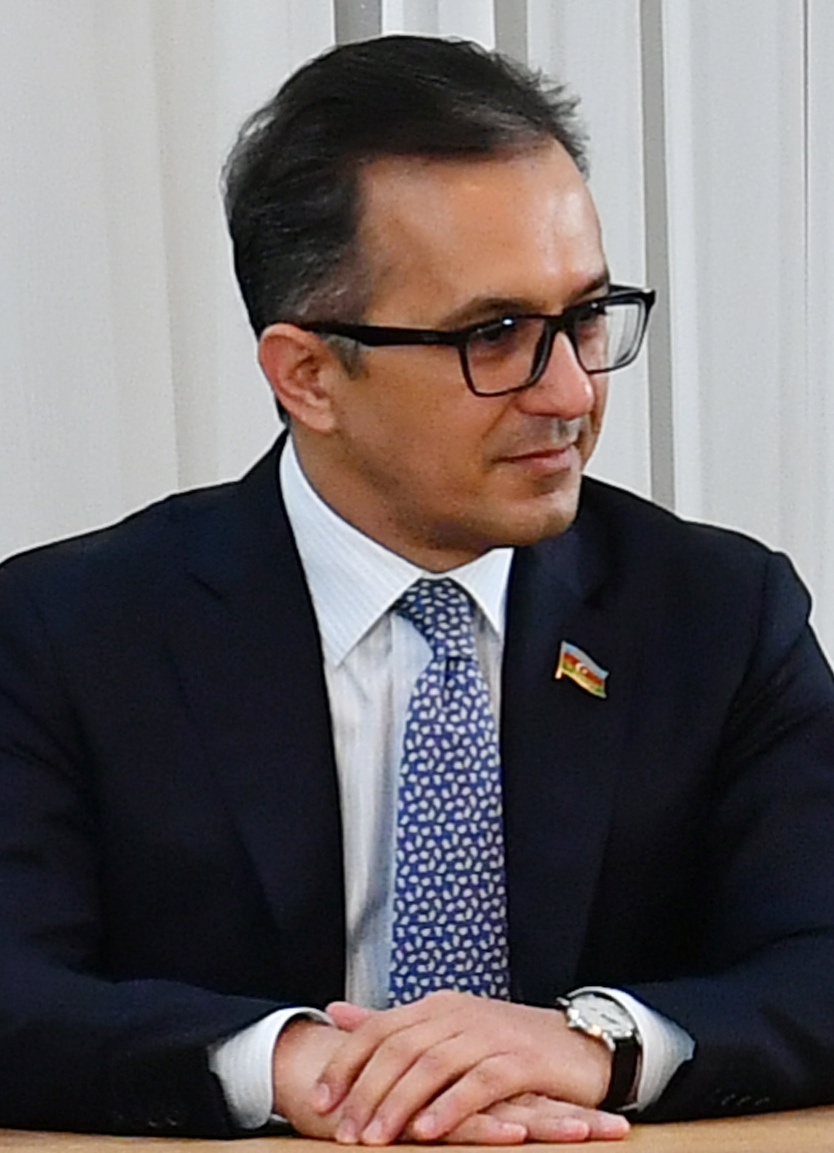

Chairman of State Committee on Affairs with Religious Associations of the Republic of Azerbaijan
- Incumbent
- Assumed office 8 April 2024
- Preceded by: Mubariz Gurbanli

Member of the National Assembly
- In office March 10, 2020 – 2024

Deputy chairman of the State Committee for Work with Diaspora of the Republic of Azerbaijan
- In office 2016–2020

Personal details
- Born: 17 February 1979 (age 47) Aghdara, Azerbaijan Republic
- Party: New Azerbaijan Party

Ramin Mammadov Alamshah oglu (Azerbaijani: Ramin Məmmədov Aləmşah oğlu; Chairman of State Committee on Affairs with Religious Associations (since 2024), Member of the Milli Majlis (Parliament) of the Republic of Azerbaijan (2020–2024), deputy chairman of the State Committee for Work with Diaspora of the Republic of Azerbaijan (2016–2020), point person for contacts with Armenian residents living in the Karabakh region of the Republic of Azerbaijan (since 2023).

== Early life ==
Ramin Mammadov was born in the city of Aghdara, on February 17, 1979. In 1985-1992, he attended Shusha city secondary school No. 2 and after the occupation of the city, he continued his education in Baku. He has a Bachelor’s degree in International law and international relations as well as a Master’s degree in International Relations from Baku State University. In 2013, he attended Executive Education, Leaders in Development, John F. Kennedy School of Government at Harvard University (U.S.). Ramin Mammadov is fluent in Russian and English. He is married and has one child.

== Career ==
In 2001-2002, specialist at the Ministry of Culture of the Republic of Azerbaijan;

In 2002-2009, assistant to the chairman, head of the department of the State Committee for Work with Azerbaijanis Living Abroad;

In 2009–2016, deputy head of the staff of State Committee for Work with the Diaspora of the Republic of Azerbaijan;

Ramin Mammadov was appointed as deputy chairman of the State Committee for Work with Diaspora of the Republic of Azerbaijan under the Order No. 2040 signed by the President of the Republic of Azerbaijan Ilham Aliyev dated May 12, 2016.

At extraordinary elections held on February 9, 2020, Ramin Mammadov was nominated as a single candidate of the New Azerbaijan Party for the parliamentary seat from the 64th Sabirabad constituency. He was elected as a member of Milli Majlis (Parliament) with 12,677 votes or 56.2% of the total.

As he had been elected as a Member of the Milli Majlis (Parliament), Ramin Mammadov was relieved of his position as deputy chairman of the State Committee for Work with Diaspora by Order No. 1908 of the President of the Republic of Azerbaijan Ilham Aliyev, dated March 9, 2020.

He served as a member of the Committee on Family, Women, and Children’s Affairs of the Parliament, and a member of the Committee on International Relations and Inter-Parliamentary Relations. He held positions as head of the Azerbaijan-Cambodia Inter-Parliamentary Relations Working Group and a member of working groups on relations with the parliaments of China, France, Israel, Italy, and Korea.

March 1, 2023, Ramin Mammadov was appointed as the point person for contacts with Armenian residents living in the Karabakh region of the Republic of Azerbaijan. By the Order of the President of the Republic of Azerbaijan dated April 8, 2024, he was appointed as chairman of the State Committee on Affairs with Religious Associations of the Republic of Azerbaijan.

Ramin Mammadov is a member of the New Azerbaijan Party and was elected as a member of the Party's Board at the 7th Congress of the New Azerbaijan Party held on March 5, 2021.

== Awards ==
- Medal "For Distinction in the Civil Service" by the Order of the President of the Republic of Azerbaijan Mr. Ilham Aliyev dated July 6, 2012.
- Medal "Progress" by the Order of the President of the Republic of Azerbaijan Mr. Ilham Aliyev dated November 18, 2017.
