= Freedom of religion in Azerbaijan =

Freedom of religion in Azerbaijan is substantially curtailed. The Azerbaijan government, which follows a strictly secular and anti-religious ideology, represses all religions.

The majority of the population in Azerbaijan is Muslim, mainly Shia. According to Michigan State University political scientist Ani Sarkissian, "the Azerbaijani government attempts to control religious practice to keep it from becoming an independent social force that might threaten the nondemocratic nature of the regime."

The government censors religious literature and closes down religious institutions that it considers objectionable. Political speech by religious institutions is forbidden and clerics are not allowed to run for political office. The display of religious paraphernalia, flags and slogans, is forbidden, except in places of worship, religious centers and offices. Ashura festivities in public are forbidden. The wearing of the hijab in public institutions and schools is forbidden.

The government uses mosque closures to repress independent Muslim groups that act independently of the state. Clerics that act in ways objectionable to the state face dismissal and arrest. The government does not restrict religious conversion, but it does forbid proselytizing.

== Religious demography ==
The country has an area of 33,436 square miles (86,600 km^{2}) and a population of 9.8 million (2017). There were no reliable statistics on membership in specific religious groups; however, according to official figures approximately 96% of the population is Muslim. The remainder of the population consists mostly of Russian Orthodox, Armenian Apostolic (Almost all of which live in the break-away region of Nagorno-Karabakh), Jews, and nonbelievers. Among the Muslim majority, religious observance is relatively low, and Muslim identity tends to be based more on culture and ethnicity than religion.

According to the State Committee on Work with Religious Associations (SCWRA), the Muslim population is approximately 65 percent Shia and 35 percent Sunni; traditionally, differences are not defined sharply. In a 2016 report, the United States Department of State puts the number as 65 percent Shia and 35 percent Sunni for the year 2011. Other sources estimate Sunnis to be between 40-50% of the total population, while Shias are estimated to be around 50-60% of the total populace.

In 2020, research showed that 96.15% of citizens are Muslim, 2.43% are Christian, 1.24% are agnostic and 0.09% are Jewish. According to CIA World Factbook's 2023 estimate, Muslims constitute around 97.3% of Azerbaijani population.

The vast majority of Christians are Russian Orthodox. According to the U.S. Department of State, their "identity, like that of Muslims, tends to be based as much on culture and ethnicity as religion". Christians were concentrated in the urban areas of Baku, which is the nation's capital, and Sumgayit, its third-largest city.

Of a total Jewish population of approximately 15,000, the vast majority live in Baku. Much smaller communities exist in Guba in village and municipality named Red Town and elsewhere. There are five to six rabbis and six synagogues in the country.

Shi'a, Sunni, Russian Orthodox, and Jews are considered to be the country's "traditional" religious groups. Small congregations of Lutherans, Roman Catholics, Baptists, Molokans (Old Believers), Seventh-day Adventists, and followers of the Baháʼí Faith have been present for over 100 years.

In the last decade, a number of religious groups considered foreign or "nontraditional" by the Azeri regime have established a presence, including "Wahhabi" and Salafist Muslims, Pentecostal and evangelical Christians, Jehovah's Witnesses, Hare Krishnas and Iran-backed Khomeinist groups.

== Restrictions on religion ==
In 2022, the European Court of Human Rights found the government violated individual freedom of religion or belief in cases involving seven individuals. At the end of the year, 22 individuals were detained due to their religious beliefs or practices.

In 2023, the country was scored zero out of four for religious freedom by Freedom House.

In 2019, the United States Commission on International Religious Freedom reported the arrest of 77 individuals labelled as "Shia extremists", of which 48 were considered political prisoners by human rights defenders, they also reported that in court hearings throughout the year, these individuals testified that police and other officials tortured them to coerce false confessions. Local human rights groups and others stated the government continued to physically abuse, arrest, and imprison religious activists. Authorities briefly detained, fined, or warned individuals for holding unauthorized religious meetings; as the government’s requirements for legal registration were unachievable for communities with less than 50 members. The government controls the importation, distribution, and sale of religious materials. The courts fined individuals for the unauthorized sale or distribution of religious materials.

Civil society representatives stated citizens continued to tolerate “traditional” minority religious groups (i.e., those historically present in the country), including Jews, Russian Orthodox, and Catholics; however, groups viewed as “nontraditional” were often viewed with suspicion and mistrust.

Despite being a Shia majority country, the ruling regime of Ilham Aliyev regularly and aggressively enforces secularism. Azeri officials regularly blame Iran of spreading its Khomeinist ideology amongst Azeri Shi'ites, through its network of supporters in Azerbaijan. Azerbaijanis are forbidden to study in Iran-funded hawzas, Azeri women are discouraged and forbidden from mandatory Islamic veiling, alcohol such as beer and wine are domestically produced and regularly consumed, yearly Ashura commemorations are scrutinised and often banned.

In 2026, Azerbaijan amended its school uniform regulations in a way that, in practice, pushed the hijab out of state general education institutions. The measure avoided naming the headscarf outright. What it did instead was prohibit attire that authorities judged incompatible with the "principle of secularism." Enforcement came quickly: some schools began turning away students and teachers at the gates. Protests and an online campaign followed. According to local media, at least two schools saw class boycotts. Polad Aslanov, a journalist serving a prison sentence on high treason charges, began a hunger strike against the new rules. The reaction was not confined to Azerbaijan. Demonstrations spread to Turkiye, where protesters assembled outside the Azerbaijani consulate in Istanbul. They called on Baku to reconsider and invoked Turkiye's 1997 "post-modern coup," a period when headscarved women were barred from universities and dismissed from civil service posts. President Ilham Aliyev answered with indirect criticism of Turkiye. Without naming the country, he warned against "interfering with our lifestyle" in a speech at his New Azerbaijan Party congress. Turkish President Recep Tayyip Erdogan, addressing the UN General Assembly on September 23, pointed to growing discrimination against Muslim women. Roughly 96 percent of Azerbaijan's population is Muslim. The constitution calls the state secular while also protecting religious freedom.

== Inter-religious activities ==
Pope Francis visited Azerbaijan in October 2016.

== See also ==
- Religion in Azerbaijan
- Human rights in Azerbaijan
- State Committee for Work with Religious Organizations of Azerbaijan Republic
- Secularism in Azerbaijan
