= Religion in Azerbaijan =

Religion in Azerbaijan (ARDA 2025)
1. Shia Islam (66.2%)
2. Sunni Islam (30.0%)
3. Christianity (2.42%)
4. No religion (1.30%)
5. Other religions (0.13%)

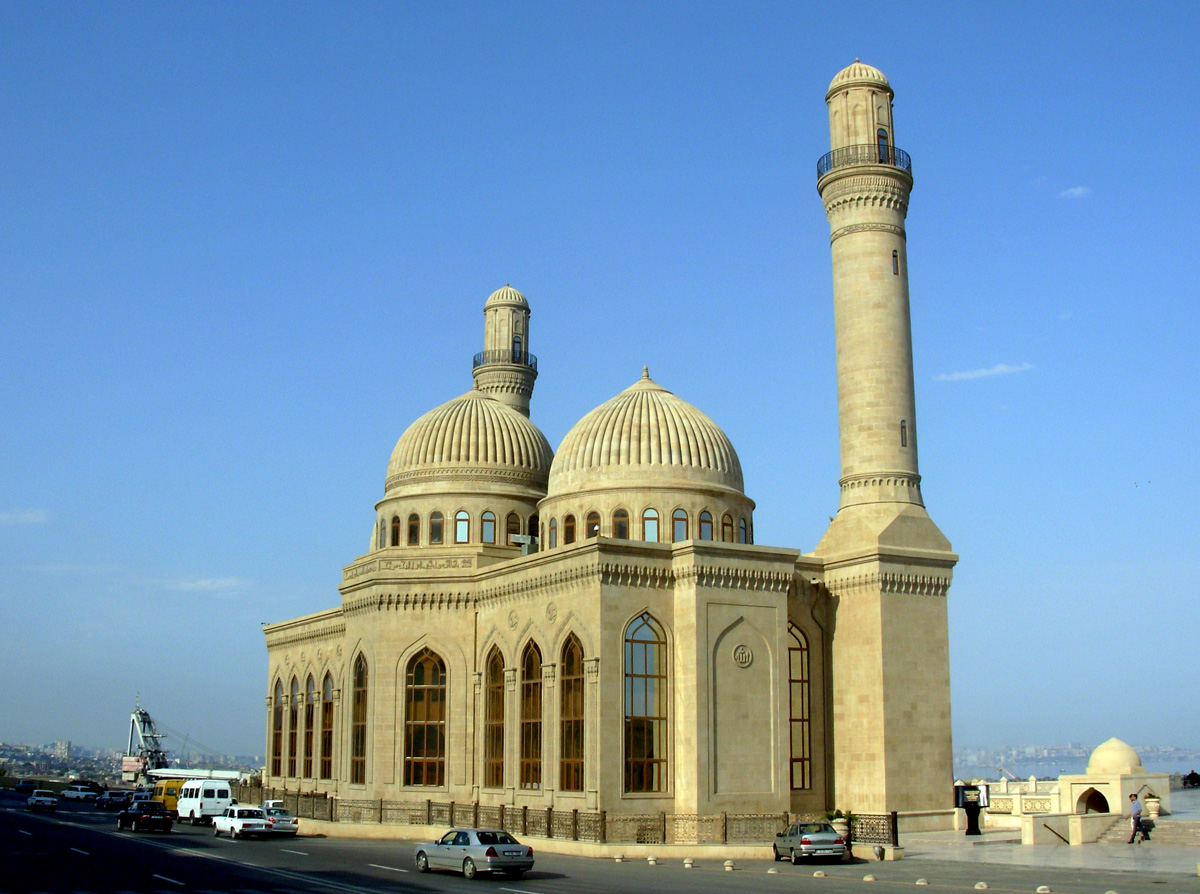
The Bibi-Heybat Mosque in Baku, Azerbaijan

Islam is the majority religion in Azerbaijan. Estimates include 97.3% in 2020 by The World Factbook and 99.2% in the 2006 Demographic and Health Survey according to the Pew Research Center of the population identifying as Muslim. A majority of them belong to the Shia branch (55–65% of Muslims), while a significant minority (35%–45%) are Sunni. (Note: "2021 Report on International Religious Freedom: Azerbaijan". U.S. Department of State. 2 June 2022. Archived from the original on 4 June 2022. "According to 2011 SCWRA data (the most recent available), 96 percent of the population is Muslim, of which approximately 65 percent is Shia and 35 percent Sunni."; Greenger, Nurit (8 May 2017). "Azerbaijan a Destination Worthwhile. My week travel log in Azerbaijan - Day two". The Jerusalem Post. Archived from the original on 19 January 2023.; Balci, Bayram (18 March 2013). "The Syrian Crisis: A View from Azerbaijan". Carnegie Endowment for International Peace. Archived from the original on 18 January 2022.; Ismayilov, Murad (2018). "1: Hybrid Intentionality and Exogenus Sources of Elite's Manifold Attitudes to Islam in Azerbaijan". The Dialectics of Post-Soviet Modernity and the Changing Contours of Islamic Discourse in Azerbaijan. London SE11 4AB: Lexington Books. p. 2. ISBN 9781498568364. "the country's population historically divided between the Shia (currently some 50-65 percent of the population) and the Sunni (about 35-50 percent)."; S. Nielsem, Jorgen; Balciz Goyushov, Bayram, Altay (2013). "Azerbaijan". Yearbook of Muslims in Europe: Volume 5. Leiden, The Netherlands: Brill. p. 65. ISBN 978-90-04-25456-5. "quote:"While traditionally approximately 65% of local Muslims are considered Shi'i and 35% Sunnis, due to a great success of international Sunni missionary organisations after the collapse of the Soviet Union, currently the estimated number of practicising Sunni and Shi'i Muslims in the big urban areas are almost equal""; Whitaker's Shorts 2015: International. Bloomsbury. 2014. ISBN 9781472914842.) Traditionally, the differences between these two branches of Islam have not been sharply defined in Azerbaijan, and both communities have historically coexisted peacefully. Shia Muslims in the country typically adhere to the Ja'fari school of Shia Islam, while most Sunni Muslims follow the Hanafi school. Due to many decades of Soviet atheist policy, Muslim religious affiliation in Azerbaijan is largely cultural and ethnic rather than religious. Shia Islam is prevalent in the western, central, and southern regions of the country. Traditionally, villages around Baku and the Lankaran region are considered Shia strongholds. In contrast, Sunni Islam is dominant in the northern regions.

A 2024 Gallup report conducted across multiple countries, including Azerbaijan, stated that in Azerbaijan, 56% of respondents said they were religious, 37% said they were not religious, and 0% said they were atheist.

The rest of the population adheres to other faiths or nothing at all; they are not officially represented. Other religious traditions that are followed by many in the country are the Russian Orthodox Church, and various other Christian denominations.

Like all other post-Soviet states formerly ruled by the Soviet Union, Azerbaijan is a secular state; Article 48 of its Constitution ensures the freedom of religion. A 1996 law states that foreigners have freedom of conscience but are denied the right to "carry out religious propaganda" (i.e., to proselytize) under the threat of fines or deportation. According to paragraphs 1-3 of Article 18 of the Constitution, religion acts separately from the government; each religion is equal before the law; and the propaganda of religions, abatement of human personality, and contradictions to the principles of humanism are prohibited.

== Islam ==
External videos
- Day of Ashura in Azerbaijan
- Azerbaijanis celebrate Eid al-Adha
- Muharram commemoration in Baku

Heydar Mosque

The role of Islam in politics and in everyday life in Azerbaijan remains relatively small. Surveys in the late Soviet and early post-Soviet era generally found that although the vast majority of Azerbaijanis identify themselves as Muslims, less than a quarter of those who considered themselves Muslims "had even a basic understanding of the pillars of Islam". For many Azerbaijanis, association with Islam tended towards a more ethnic/nationalistic identity than a purely religious one. A 1998 poll estimated the proportion of ardent believers in Azerbaijan at only 20 percent.

In the post-soviet period, although the majority of Azerbaijan's population still nominally identifies with Islam, studies show that the Azerbaijani society has remained relatively secular in the years following the collapse of the Soviet Union. While the estimates identify 93–99% of Azerbaijan's population as adherents of Islam, the importance of religion on everyday life remains low. According to government estimates, Muslim population is approximately 55-65% Shia and 35-45% Sunni, however, officially the differences have not been sharply emphasized. (Note: "2021 Report on International Religious Freedom: Azerbaijan". U.S. Department of State. 2 June 2022. Archived from the original on 4 June 2022. "According to 2011 SCWRA data (the most recent available), 96 percent of the population is Muslim, of which approximately 65 percent is Shia and 35 percent Sunni."; Greenger, Nurit (8 May 2017). "Azerbaijan a Destination Worthwhile. My week travel log in Azerbaijan - Day two". The Jerusalem Post. Archived from the original on 19 January 2023.; Balci, Bayram (18 March 2013). "The Syrian Crisis: A View from Azerbaijan". Carnegie Endowment for International Peace. Archived from the original on 18 January 2022.; Ismayilov, Murad (2018). "1: Hybrid Intentionality and Exogenus Sources of Elite's Manifold Attitudes to Islam in Azerbaijan". The Dialectics of Post-Soviet Modernity and the Changing Contours of Islamic Discourse in Azerbaijan. London SE11 4AB: Lexington Books. p. 2. ISBN 9781498568364. "the country's population historically divided between the Shia (currently some 50-65 percent of the population) and the Sunni (about 35-50 percent)."; S. Nielsem, Jorgen; Balciz Goyushov, Bayram, Altay (2013). "Azerbaijan". Yearbook of Muslims in Europe: Volume 5. Leiden, The Netherlands: Brill. p. 65. ISBN 978-90-04-25456-5. "quote:"While traditionally approximately 65% of local Muslims are considered Shi'i and 35% Sunnis, due to a great success of international Sunni missionary organisations after the collapse of the Soviet Union, currently the estimated number of practicising Sunni and Shi'i Muslims in the big urban areas are almost equal""; Whitaker's Shorts 2015: International. Bloomsbury. 2014. ISBN 9781472914842.) Azeri Shi'a relations with Iran, its neighbor and the dominant Shi'i power, are not close, at least as of the mid-1990s. The head of Azeri Shi'ite clergy, Shiekh Haji Humat Pashazada, adheres to the quietist school of Abu al-Qasim al-Khu'i and was a pupil of Iranian cleric Mohammad Kazem Shariatmadari. (both clerics were strong opponents of Khomeinist doctrines and the repressive policies of the Iranian government).

The Azerbaijani government maintains a secular position. Article 7 of the Azerbaijani constitution officially declares Azerbaijan a secular state. Article 18 declares the separation of religion and state, the equality of all religions before the law, and also declares the secular character of the state educational system. In December 2010, Azerbaijan's Education Ministry, announced the ban on the hijab, whereby students are forbidden from wearing hijabs in schools. In April 2021, an additional set of proposals were submitted to the Azerbaijani parliament introducing additional, intensely secular amendments to Azerbaijan's Religion Law and Administrative Code.

== Religion minorities ==
=== Christianity ===
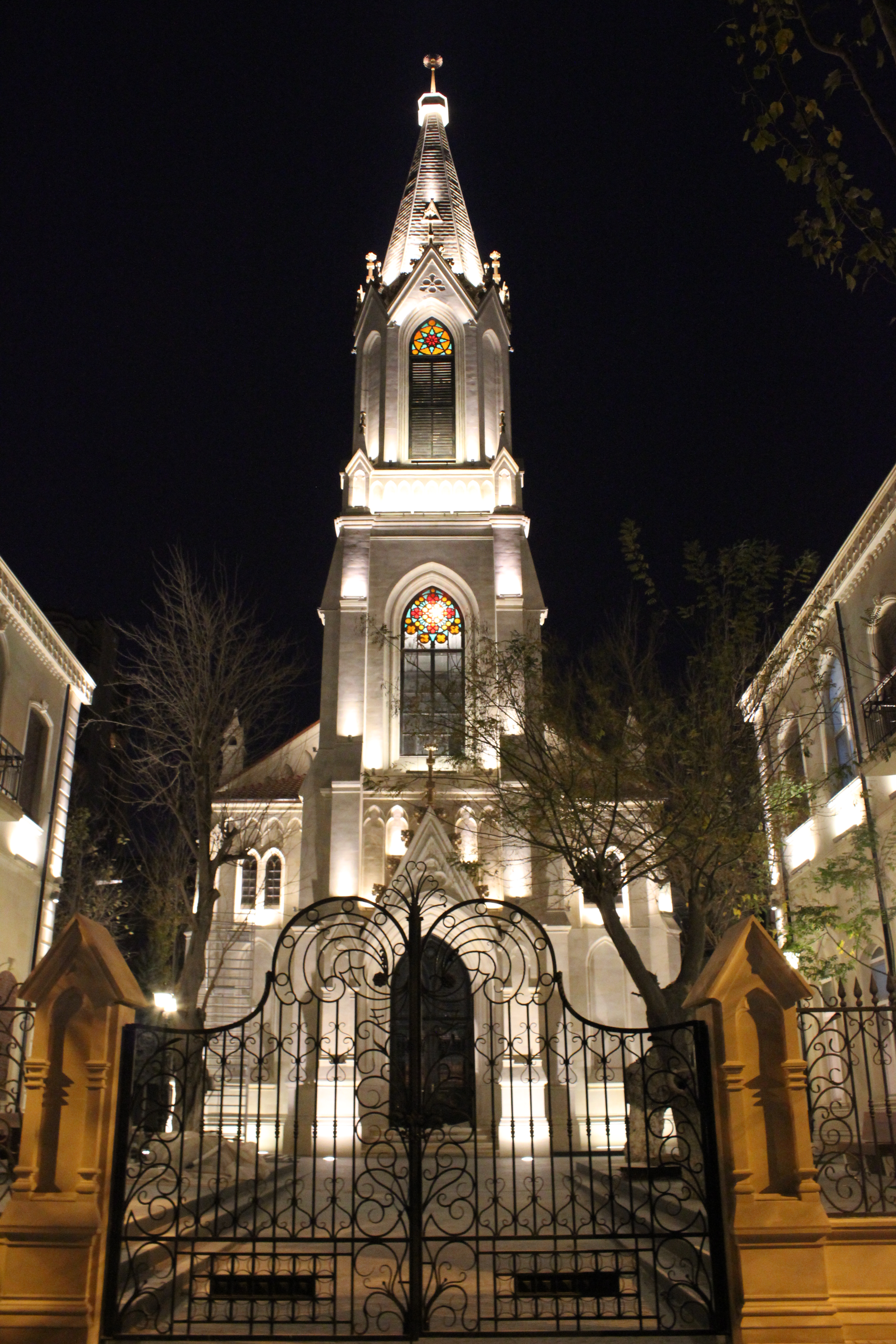
Lutheran Church of the Saviour in Baku

The Christian religion began to be spread in the territory of present-day Azerbaijan in the first years of the Apostolic era. Christianity is represented by Orthodoxy, Catholicism and Protestantism as well as a number of minority communities in Azerbaijan.

Christians, who are estimated to number between 280,000 and 450,000 (3.1%–4.8%) are mostly Russian and Georgian Orthodox and Armenian Apostolic (before 1990 across Azerbaijan, between 1990 and 2023 only in the breakaway Nagorno-Karabakh region, and after the collapse of the breakaway Republic of Artsakh and the flight of virtually all Armenians, practically none). There is also a small ethnic Azerbaijani Protestant community, numbering around 5,000, mostly from Muslim backgrounds.

==== Eastern Orthodox Church ====
Orthodoxy is currently represented in Azerbaijan by the Russian and Georgian Orthodox churches. The Russian Orthodox Churches are grouped in the Eparchy of Baku and the Caspian region.

Azerbaijan also has eleven Molokan communities related to the old rituals of Orthodoxy. These communities do not have any church; their dogmas are fixed in a special book of rituals. They oppose the church hierarchy which has a special power.

==== Saint Gregory the Illuminator Church ====
Saint Gregory the Illuminator Church (Azerbaijani: Müqəddəs Qriqori kilsəsi, Armenian: Սուրբ Գրիգոր Լուսաւորիչի Եկեղեցի) was built in 1871. In 1869 Baku military governor Mikhail Petrovich Kolyubakin allotted land for the building of the church. The building was designed by Carl Gippius, brother of famous artist Otto Gustavovich Gippius (Yevstafiyevich) and architect of Baku city and the governorate. Carl Gippius's first work was the St Charles Church in Tallinn and the second was Saint Gregory the Illuminator Church in Baku. He dedicated most of his life to construction of churches. In 1903, a library and school were built in the courtyard of the church. It survived through the Soviet state atheist policies of the 1920s and 1930s when all but one Armenian church in Baku were destroyed. In 2002 the church was transferred to the Presidential Library, which is located nearby, and now houses its archive.

==== Albanian-Udi Church ====
Approximately 6,000 of the 10,000 people of the Udi ethnic community live in Azerbaijan including 4,400 people residing in Nij village, Qabala District.

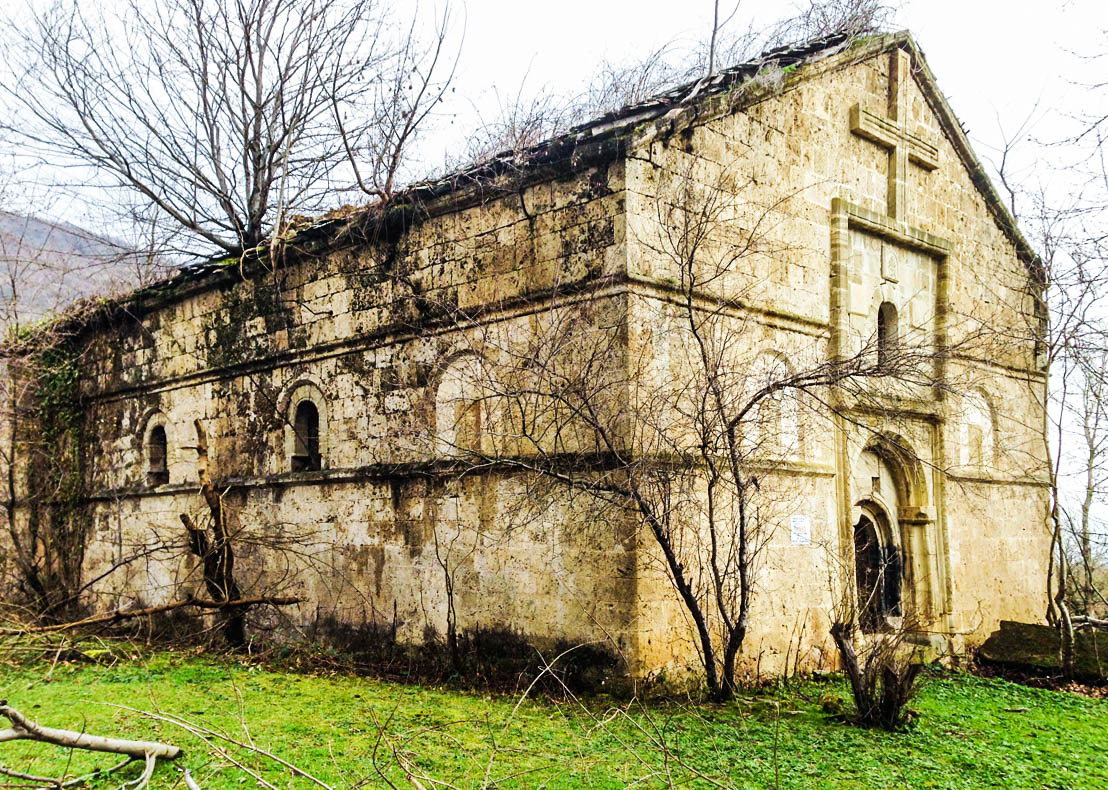
Calut monastery church in Calut, Oghuz District

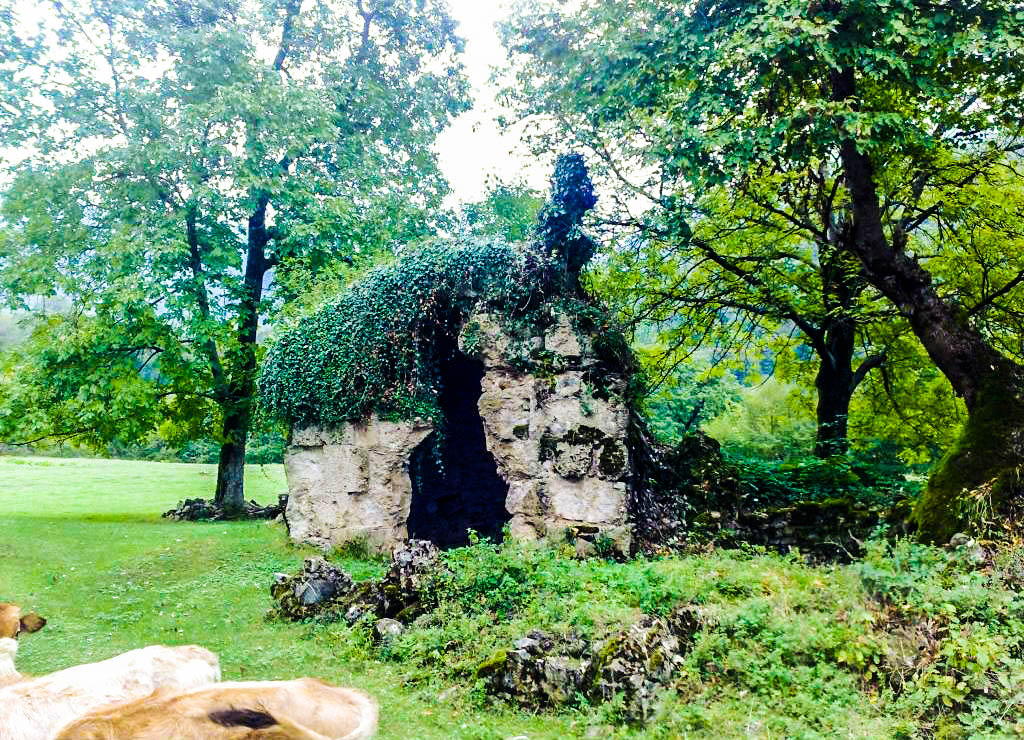
Seven Church monastery complex

==== Catholic Church ====
There is a tiny Catholic community in Baku and its surroundings, with less than a thousand members.

The Vatican Foreign Minister Giovanni Lajolo visited Baku on May 19, 2006. During the visit that lasted until May 25, he met with President Ilham Aliyev and chairman of the Caucasus Clerical Office, Sheikh Allahshukur Pashazadeh to discuss ties between Azerbaijan and the Vatican.

Giovanni Lajolo made the following statements: "We are satisfied with the level of friendly communications between Azerbaijan and Vatican". "Azerbaijan really is a place of merge of religions and cultures. We highly estimate tolerance existing here. And we are very glad with intensive development of Azerbaijan. Vatican is interested in expansion of relations with Azerbaijan, and the purpose of my visit to Baku consists in carrying out of exchange by opinions on the further development of our ties."

Baku's Catholic church was demolished in the Stalin era, but a new one commenced building in September 2005 and was opened in the summer of 2007.

=== Judaism ===
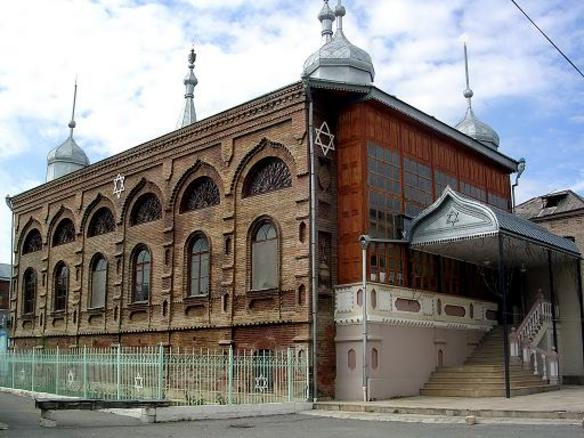
Qırmızı Qəsəbə has a large Jewish community.

There are three separate communities of Jews (Mountain Jews, Ashkenazi Jews, and Georgian Jews) in Azerbaijan, who total almost 16,000 combined. Of them, 11,000 are Mountain Jews, with concentrations of 6,000 in Baku and 4,000 in Quba, 4,300 are Ashkenazi Jews, most of whom live in Baku and Sumgait, and 700 are Georgian Jews. There are three synagogues in Baku and a few in the provinces. Sheikh-ul-Islam Allahshukur Pashazade has donated US$40,000 for the construction of the Jewish House in Baku in 2000. There is also a Jewish village called Qırmızı Qəsəbə.

=== Baháʼí Faith ===
The Baháʼí Faith in Azerbaijan crosses a complex history of regional changes. Before 1850, followers of the predecessor religion Bábism were established in Nakhchivan. By the early 20th century, the Baháʼí community, now centered in Baku, numbered perhaps 2,000 individuals and several Baháʼí Local Spiritual Assemblies. This had facilitated the favorable attention of local, regional and international leaders of thought as well as long standing leading figures in the religion. However under the official doctrine of state atheism during Soviet rule, the Baháʼí community was almost ended, though it was immediately reactivated as perestroika loosened controls on religions. The Bahá'í community of Azerbaijan re-elected its own National Spiritual Assembly in 1992. By 2007, the modern Bahá'í population of Azerbaijan, centered in Baku, had regained its peak from prior to the Soviet period, with about 2,000 adherents, of which more than 80% were converts. However, the Bahá'í community in Nakhchivan, where the Azerbaijani faithful were first established, was being seriously harassed and oppressed as recently as 2006, though this may also be related to paragraphs 1–3 of Article 18 of the Azerbaijani Constitution, confirming that each religion is equal before the law, but the propaganda of religions, abating human personality and contradicting to the principles of humanism is prohibited.

=== Zoroastrianism ===
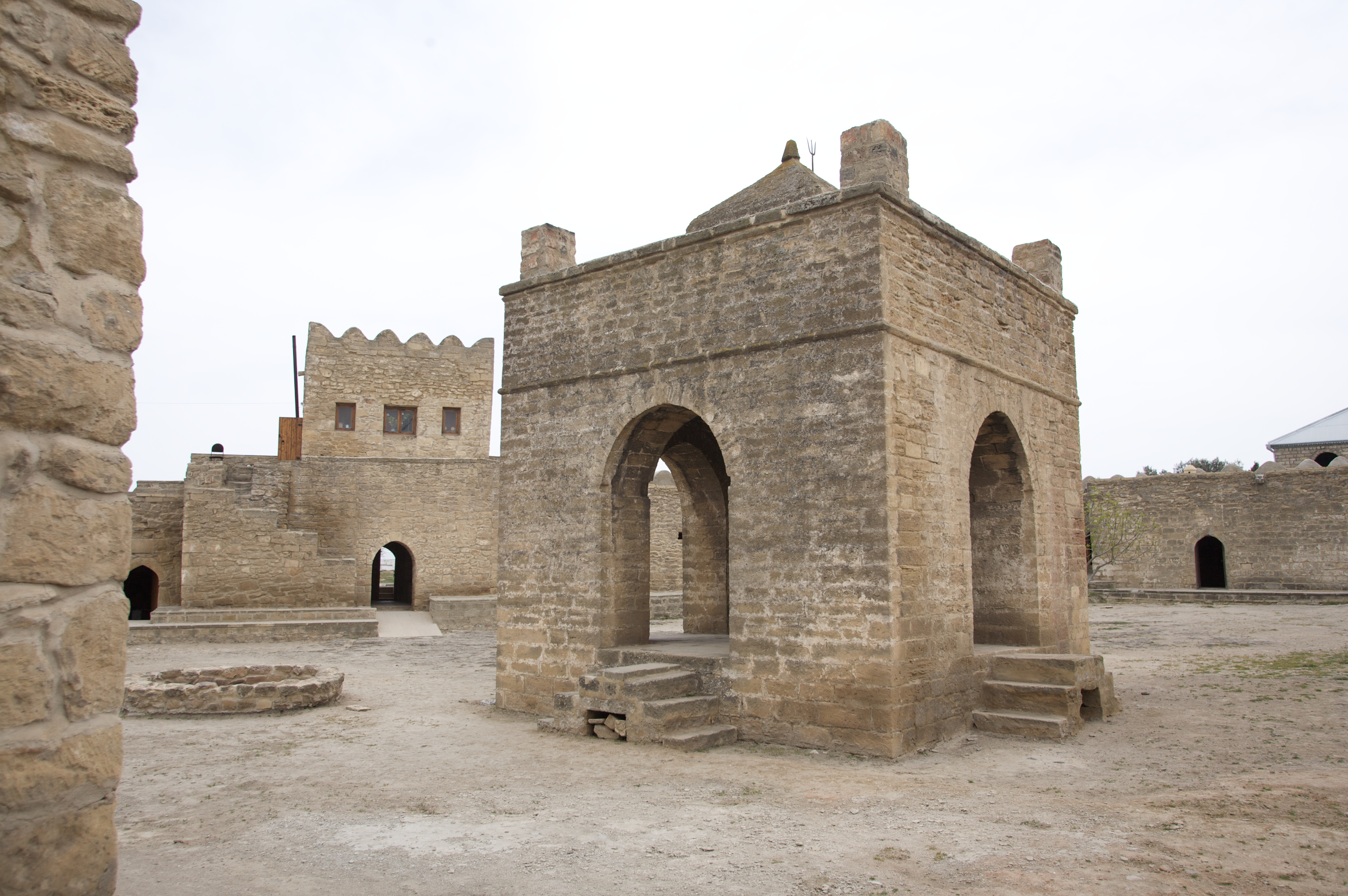
Ateshgah Fire Temple in Azerbaijan

External videos
- Azerbaijan celebrates Novruz. Part 1
- Azerbaijan celebrates Novruz. Part 2

The history of Zoroastrianism in Azerbaijan goes back to the first millennium BC. Together with the other territories of the Persian Empire, Azerbaijan remained a predominantly Zoroastrian state until the Arab invasion in the 7th century. The name Azerbaijan means the "Land of The Eternal Fire" in Middle Persian, a name that is said to have a direct link with Zoroastrianism. Today the religion, culture, and traditions of Zoroastrianism remain highly respected in Azerbaijan, and Novruz continues to be the main holiday in the country. Zoroastrianism has left a deep mark in the history of Azerbaijan. Traces of the religion are still visible in Ramana, Khinalug, and Yanar Dagh.

Zoroastrianism in Azerbaijan has been tied not to survival of the ancient religion in the area, but a more recent arrival of the Parsi Zoroastrians coming from the British India at the time of the discovery of oil in Baku and the need for expert labor in the 1880s. The Fire Temple of Baku was constructed for their use at the site of an ancient fire temple utilizing the naturally burning gas and oil on the ground. The fire temple is constructed in the chartaqi layout used by Zoroastrians for thousands of years.

=== Hinduism ===
Hinduism in Azerbaijan has been tied to cultural diffusion on the Silk Road. In the Middle Ages, Hindu traders visited present-day Azerbaijan for the Silk Road trade. The area was traversed by Hindu traders coming mostly from Multan and Sindh (Pakistan). The Hindus also have the Fire Temple of Baku. Today there are over 400–500 Hindus in Azerbaijan.

== Older religions ==
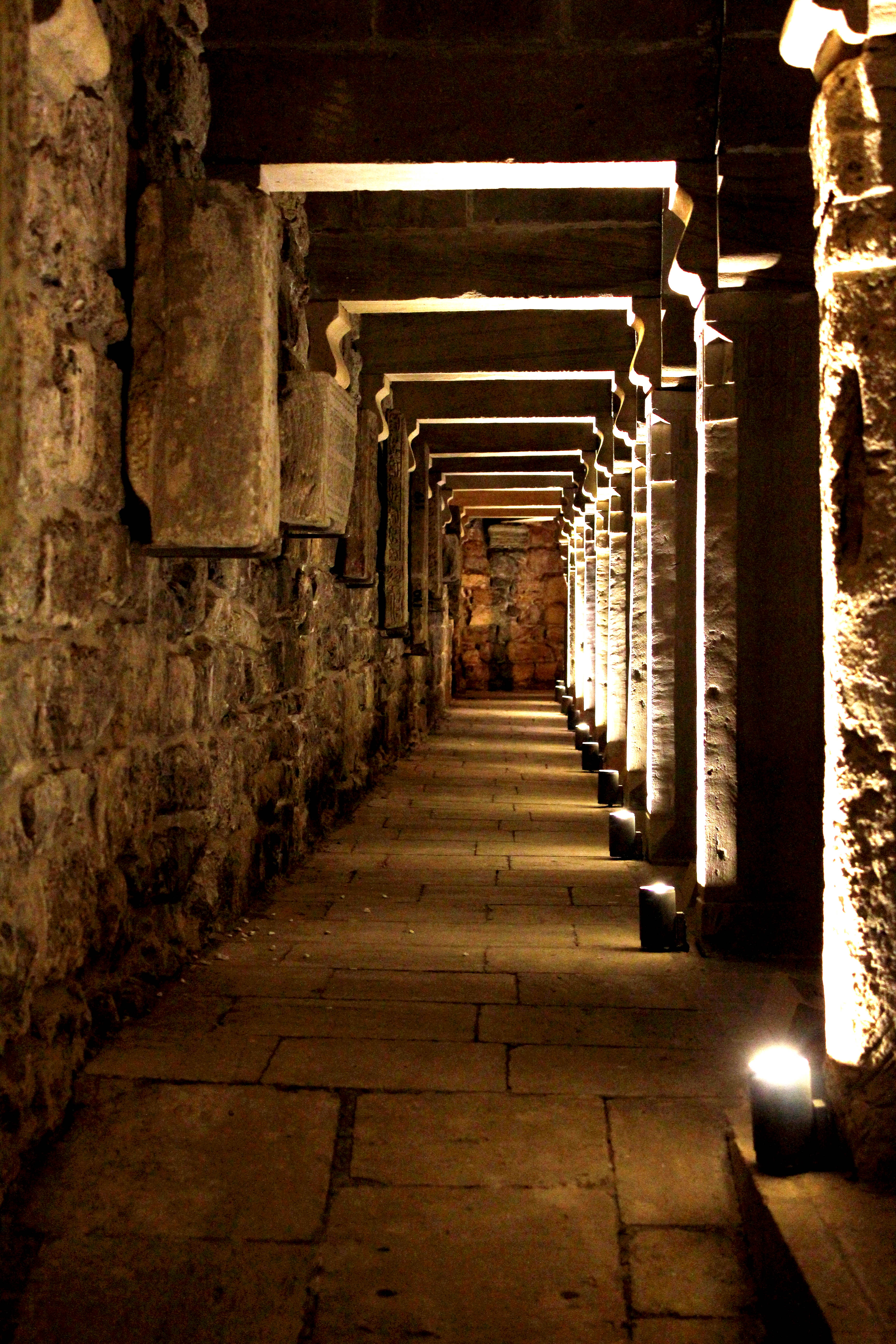
A pagan temple in Baku

Very little is known about pre-Christian and pre-Islamic Azerbaijani mythology; sources are mostly Hellenic historians like Strabo and based on archeological evidence. Strabo names the gods of the sun, the sky, and above all, the moon.

== Multiculturalism in Azerbaijan ==
There are 1802 Mosques, 10 Synagogues, 5 Russian Orthodox, 1 Catholic, 4 Georgian Orthodox, 1 Lutheran church and other places of worship in Azerbaijan. The Red Town of Guba has been home to Jews since the 13th century with their unique language, specific customs and traditions and is believed to be the world's only all-Jewish town outside Israel. There are 2 schools for Jewish children, and 2 synagogues in the town.

Article 25 and 44 of the Constitution of Azerbaijan grants equality of rights and liberties of everyone, irrespective of race, nationality, religion, language, sex, origin, financial position, occupation, political convictions, membership in political parties, trade unions and other public organizations. President of Azerbaijan Ilham Aliyev declared 2016 to be the "Year of Multiculturalism".

== Freedom of religion ==
The constitution of Azerbaijan provides for freedom of religion, and the law does not allow religious activities to be interfered with unless they endanger public order.

The 2004 U.S. Department of State report on Human Rights in Azerbaijan noted some instances in which freedom of religion was violated, such as interference with the Juma Mosque due to the political activism of its Imam. All religious organizations are required to register with the government, and groups such as Baptists, Jehovah's Witnesses, and members of the Assemblies of God continue to be denied religious registration. The official website of Jehovah's Witnesses has documented a number of acts of religious intolerance being committed by the Azerbaijan government against members of Jehovah's Witnesses.

As a result of the First Nagorno-Karabakh War, mosques in the Nagorno-Karabakh region have been abandoned, and Armenian churches in Azerbaijan have likewise been inactive or damaged in the fighting.

The position of the governmental authorities towards Islam is controversial. Men who grow beards more than normal are often viewed with suspicion by the authorities, for fear of the propagation of Wahhabism. Despite the government's denial of the matter, the Azerbaijani police drew criticism from lawyers for infringing the rights of observant Muslims.

However, the 2009 Religion Law requires the compulsory re-registration of all religious groups. The overwhelming majority of religious groups that have been granted re-registration are Muslim. Hundreds of others are still waiting to hear from the authorities.

In 2019, the United States Commission on International Religious Freedom reported the arrest of 77 individuals labeled as "Shia extremists", of which 48 were considered political prisoners by human rights defenders, they also reported that in court hearings throughout the year, these individuals testified that police and other officials tortured them to coerce false confessions. Authorities briefly detained, fined, or warned individuals for holding unauthorized religious meetings; as the government's requirements for legal registration were unachievable for communities with less than 50 members. The courts fined individuals for the unauthorized sale or distribution of religious materials. Civil society representatives stated citizens continued to tolerate "traditional" minority religious groups (i.e., those historically present in the country), including Jews, Russian Orthodox, and Catholics; however, groups viewed as "nontraditional" were often viewed with suspicion and mistrust.

Despite being Shia Muslim majority country, the ruling regime of Ilham Aliyev regularly and aggressively enforces secularism.

In 2023, the country was scored zero out of four for religious freedom.

== See also ==
- Irreligion in Azerbaijan
- State Committee for Work with Religious Organizations of Azerbaijan Republic
- Religion by country
