= State Committee on Affairs with Religious Associations of the Republic of Azerbaijan =

State religious body in Azerbaijan

- Azərbaycan Respublikası Dini Qurumlarla İş üzrə Dövlət Komitəsi
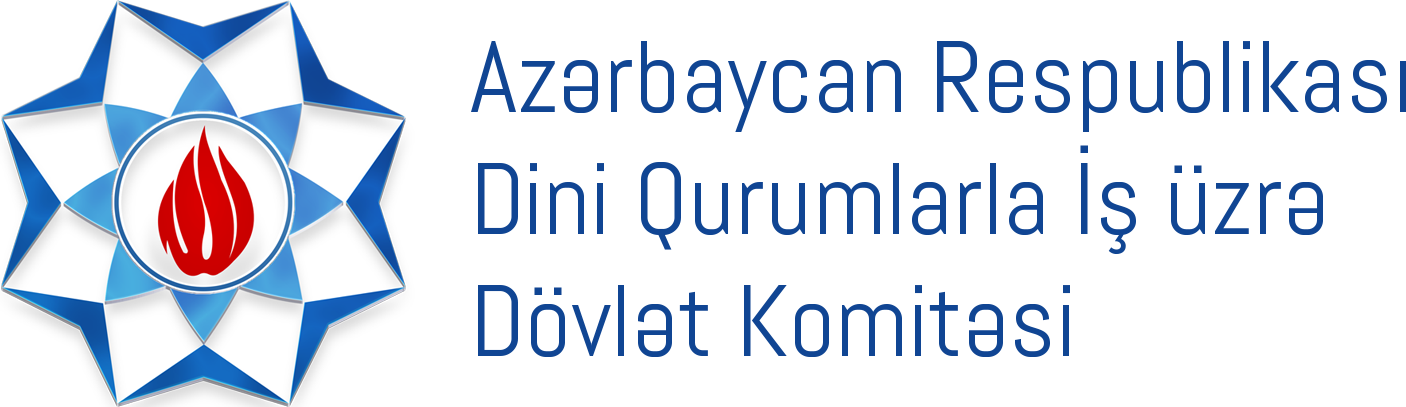

Agency overview
- Formed: June 21, 2001
- Headquarters: 12 Ahmad Javad Street, Gate III, Baku, Azerbaijan Republic AZ1001
- Agency executive: Ramin Mammadov, Chairman; Gunduz İsmayilov, Deputy Chairman; Sahib Naghiyev, Deputy Chairman
- Website: www.scara.gov.az

The State Committee on Affairs with Religious Associations (Azerbaijani: Azərbaycan Respublikası Dini Qurumlarla İş üzrə Dövlət Komitəsi) is a central executive body which ensures implementation of the state policy and laws in the field of religion. The State Committee was established on June 21, 2001.

Freedom of religion in Azerbaijan is substantially curtailed. The Azerbaijan government, which follows strictly secular and anti-religious ideology, represses all religions.

== State Committee chairs ==
- Rafiq Aliyev (21 June 2001 – 25 June 2006)
- Hidayat Orujov (25 June 2006 – 31 May 2012)
- Elshad Isgandarov (31 May 2012 – 2 May 2014)
- Mubariz Gurbanli (21 July 2014 – 14 February 2024)
- Ramin Mammadov (since 8 April 2024)
