= Alexeyev =

Alexeyev, Alekseyev, Alexeiev, Alexeev or Alekseev (Russian: Алексе́ев) is a common Russian surname that is derived from the male given name Alexey (Алексей) and literally means Alexey's. Often the same name appears in English in several different transliterations. Similarly, Alexeyeva, Alekseyeva, Alexeeva and Alekseeva are female versions of the same last name.

== People ==
=== Alekseev ===
- Alekseev (singer) (born 1993), Ukrainian singer
- Anton Alekseyev (born 1984), Ukrainian-born professional footballer in Russia
- Anton Alekseev (mathematician) (born 1967), Russian mathematician
- Evgeny Alekseev (chess player) (born 1985), Russian chess-grandmaster
- Evgeny Alekseev (basketball) (1919–2005), Russian basketball-player and coach
- Mikhail Alekseev (1857–1918), Russian military officer
- Mikhail Egorovich Alekseev (1949–2014), Soviet and Russian Caucasian-language specialist
- Nikolai Alekseev (Catholic priest) (1869–1952), Russian Greek-Catholic priest
- Nikolai Alekseev (born 1977), Russian gay-rights activist
- Oleg Alekseev (1953–2015) Soviet wrestler
- Vladimir Mikhailovich Alekseev (1932–1980), Russian mathematician

=== Alekseeva ===
- Alena Alekseeva (born 1989), Russian swimmer
- Svetlana Alekseeva (figure skater) (born 1965), Russian ice dancer
- Svetlana Alekseeva (model) (born 1999/2000), Russian model and burns survivor

=== Alexeev ===
- Alexander Alexeev (conductor) (1938–2020), Russian conductor
- Dmitri Alexeev (pianist) (born 1947), Russian pianist
- Nikita Alexeev (born 1981), Russian ice hockey player
- Vadim Alexeev (born 1970), Israeli breaststroke swimmer

=== Aleksejev ===
- Marko Aleksejev (born 1979), Estonian high jumper
- Tiit Aleksejev (born 1968), Estonian writer

=== Alekseyev ===
- Aleksandr Alekseyev (boxer) (born 1981), Russian boxer
- Dmitri Alekseyev (born 1973), Russian professional footballer
- Fyodor Alekseyev (c. 1753–1824), Russian landscape painter
- Nikolay Alekseyev (mayor of Moscow) (1852–1893), Russian entrepreneur, philanthropist, and public figure
- Valentin Alekseyev (1924–1994), Russian historian
- Valeri Alekseyev (disambiguation), several people
- Vasiliy Alekseyev (1942–2011), Russian superheavyweight weightlifter
- Vasiliy Mikhaylovich Alekseyev (1881–1951), Russian philologist, sinologist, and academician
- Vladimir Alekseyev (general) (born 1961), Russian general
- Yevgeni Alekseyev (disambiguation), several people

=== Alexeyev ===
- Alexander Alexeyev (ice hockey) (born 1999), Russian ice hockey player
- Alexander Alexeyev (diplomat), Soviet intelligence agent and diplomat
- Kirill Alexeyev (born 1981), Russian ice hockey player
- Mikhail Nikolayevich Alexeyev (1918–2007), Soviet writer
- Pyotr Alexeyevich Alexeyev (1849–1891), Russian revolutionary
- Rostislav Alexeyev (1916–1980), Russian vehicle designer
- Sergei Alexeyev (1924–2013), Russian politician and physicist
- Vladimir Alexeyev (admiral) (1912–1999), Soviet admiral

=== Alekseyeva ===
- Alla Alekseyeva (born 1934), Russian rower
- Tatyana Alekseyeva (born 1963), Russian 400 metre runner

=== Alexeyeva ===
- Lidiya Alekseyeva (1924–2014), Russian basketball player and coach
- Lyudmila Alexeyeva (1927–2018), Moscow Helsinki Group founder and Chairwoman since 1996

=== Others ===
- Alexandre Alexeieff (1901–1982), Russian artist, filmmaker and illustrator
- Konstantin Stanislavski (1863–1938), stage name of actor and director Konstantin Sergeievich Alexeiev

== Other ==
- 9933 Alekseev, minor planet

== See also ==
- Alexeyevsky (disambiguation)
- Alexeyevka (disambiguation)
