= Alekseyevka, Azerbaijan =

Alekseyevka, Azerbaijan may refer to:

- Alekseyevka, Agstafa
- Alekseyevka, Khachmaz
- Alekseyevka, Quba
