= Alexeyevka =

Alexeyevka, Alekseyevka, Alekseevka, or Alexeevka, may refer to:

- Alexeyevka, Belgorod Oblast, a town in Russia
- Alekseyevka, Chüy, a village in Chüy Region, Kyrgyzstan
- Alexeyevka, Kazakhstan, a town in Kazakhstan
- Alekseyevka, Khachmaz, a village in Khachmaz District, Azerbaijan
- Alekseyevka, Quba, a village in Quba District, Azerbaijan
- Alexeyevka, Russia, several inhabited localities in Russia
- Həsənsu, or Alekseyevka, Agstafa District, Azerbaijan
- Kamenny Ruchey air base, or Alekseyevka, in the Russian Far East
- Ketmen-Töbö, a town in Jalal-Abad Region, Kyrgyzstan, formerly Alekseyevka
- Torez, city in Ukraine, currently Chystiakove, formerly Oleksiivka (Alekseevka)
- Alexeyevka, Moldova, a village in Gagauzia, Moldova

== See also ==
- Alexey
- Alexeyev
- Alexeyevsky (disambiguation)
