= Svetlana Alekseeva =

Svetlana Alekseeva may refer to:

- Svetlana Alekseeva (figure skater) (born 1955), Russian figure skater
- Svetlana Alekseeva (model) (born c. 1999), Russian model
