= Arthur Leist =

Arthur Leist may refer to:

- Arthur Leist (writer) (1852–1927), German writer, journalist, and translator
- Arthur Leist (racing driver) (born 2001), Brazilian auto racing driver
