= Caucasus Germans =

Ethnic group

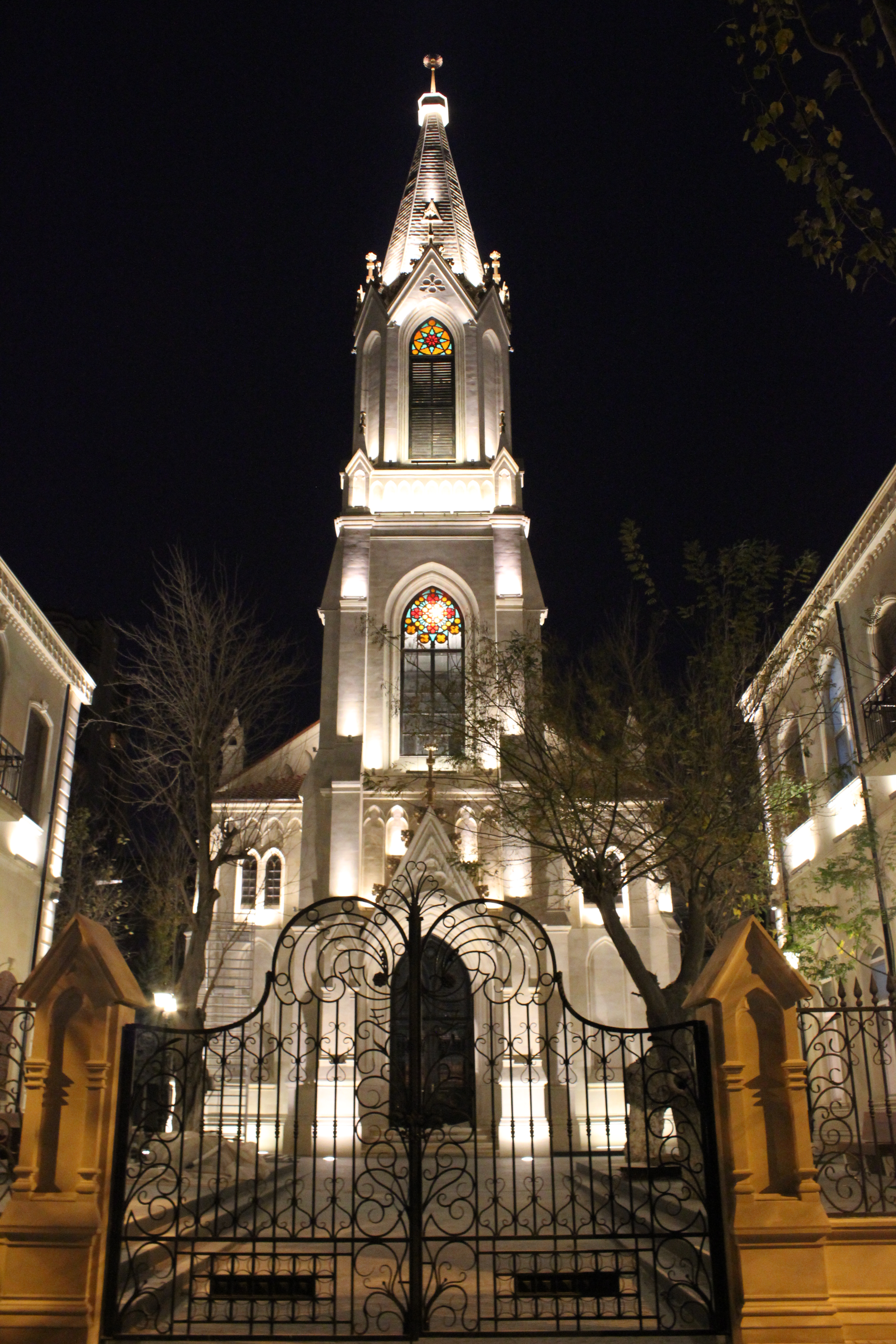
Church of the Saviour, a German church in Baku, Azerbaijan

Caucasus Germans (German: Kaukasiendeutsche) are part of the German minority in Russia and the former Soviet Union. They migrated to the Caucasus largely in the first half of the 19th century and settled in the North Caucasus, Georgia, Azerbaijan, Armenia and the region of Kars (present-day northeastern Turkey). In 1941, the majority of them were subject to deportation to Central Asia and Siberia during Joseph Stalin's population transfer in the Soviet Union. After Stalin's death in 1953 and the beginning of the Khrushchev Thaw, the Caucasus Germans were allowed to return, though only few did. Many assimilated and, after 1991, immigrated to Germany. Although the community today is a fraction of what it once was, many German buildings and churches are still extant, with some turned into museums.

== History ==
=== Origins ===
The victory of the Russian Empire under Catherine the Great in the Russo-Turkish War of 1768–1774 ensured its expansion into the Caucasus. It also created a need in populating these lands with Russian subjects in order to hasten their exploration. In the late 18th century, the government permitted families of Volga Germans to settle in the Kuban displacing the native Circassians who were being exiled from their lands to the Ottoman Empire. However, poor infrastructure, lack of organization of the officials responsible for the settlement and the refusal of the military personnel to have these lands populated by non-Russians were an obstacle to the steady and constant migration of the Germans. In 1815, while participating in the Congress of Vienna, Russian Tsar Alexander I visited Stuttgart, a city in his mother's native Kingdom of Württemberg. Upon witnessing the oppression that local peasants were undergoing either due to belonging to different non-Lutheran Protestant sects or to their participation in separatist movements, he arranged for their settlement in Russian Transcaucasia in order to form agricultural colonies.

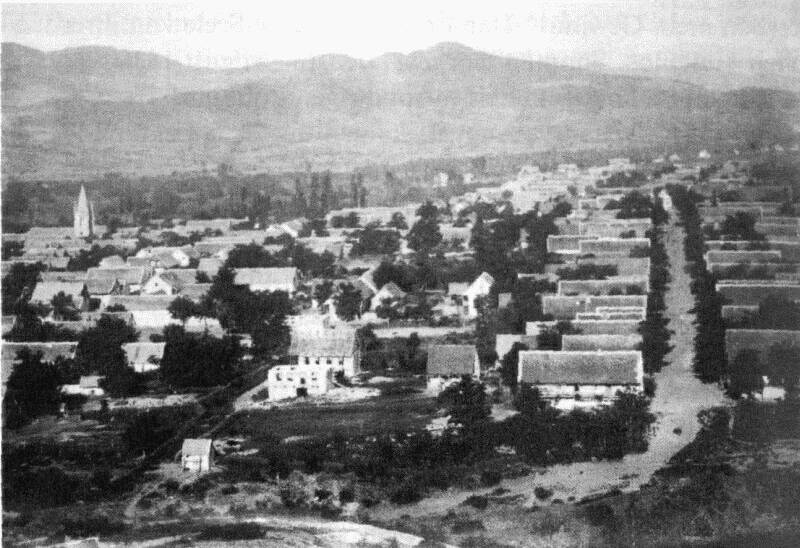
Katharinenfeld (now Bolnisi, Georgia)

=== Early 19th century ===
On September 21, 1818, the first German settlement in Transcaucasia, Marienfeld, was established by a group of Swabian Germans near the Georgian capital Tiflis (Tbilisi), along the Kakheti highway, now part of Sartichala. Two months later, another group of colonists founded another settlement in Georgia on the bank of the Asureti River and named it Elisabethtal, after the Emperor's wife Elizabeth Alexeievna (now Asureti in the Georgian province of Kvemo Kartli). Within the next year, five more colonies were established in eastern Georgia: New Tiflis (later Mikhailovsky Avenue, now part of David Agmashenebeli Avenue in Tbilisi), Alexandersdorf on the left bank of the Kura (now the vicinity of Akaki Tsereteli Avenue in Tbilisi), Petersdorf (near Marienfeld, now part of Sartichala) and Katharinenfeld (now Bolnisi). Three more colonies were founded in Abkhazia: Neudorf, Gnadenberg and Lindau.

By the late 1840s, there were five German colonies in the North Caucasus. The migration waves (especially to the Don Host Oblast) grew beginning in the second half of the 19th century with the capitalist influence on farming in Russia. Germans would immigrate not only from the regions adjacent to the Volga River but also from the Black Sea region and Germany. The majority of these Germans adhered to various branches of Protestantism: most were Lutherans, Mennonites, or Baptists. Roman Catholics formed a minority and lived in six colonies.

In the winter of 1818–1819, 194 Swabian families primarily from Reutlingen arrived in Elisabethpol (Ganja) in eastern Transcaucasia from Tiflis. They were granted land 6 kilometres to the west of the city and founded the town of Helenendorf (Goygol) in the summer of 1819. Another German settlement, the town of Annenfeld (later merged with the city of Shamkir) was founded almost simultaneously 40 kilometres away from Helenendorf.

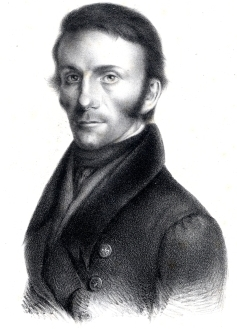
Baltic German explorer Friedrich Parrot visited Katharinenfeld and Elisabethtal during his expedition to Mount Ararat in 1829.

Germans became an active and well-integrated community in Russian Transcaucasia. Unlike the settlement of Russian religious minorities, German colonies were located in "places that were more economically advantageous, close to cities or important transportation routes." It became "typical for Caucasian administrative centers to have a satellite agrarian German colony." According to Charles King, "rows of trees lined the main streets" of the German colonies near Tiflis. "Schools and churches, conducting their business in German, offered education and spiritual edification. Beer gardens provided the main entertainment." In eastern Transcaucasia, German colonists were overwhelmingly bilingual in Azeri, while Russian was formally taught in schools starting in the late 19th century. Dolma, a traditional dish in the Caucasus and the Middle East popular among all Caucasus nationalities, became as common with the Caucasus Germans as traditional German dishes.

The Baltic German naturalist and explorer Friedrich Parrot encountered Swabian settlers near Tiflis on his expedition to Mount Ararat in 1829. He listed their settlements and personally visited Katharinenfeld and Elisabethtal, describing them:

These colonies may be known to be German at first sight from their style of building, their tillage, their carts and wagons, their furniture and utensils, mode of living, costume, and language. They contrast, therefore, strongly with the villages of the natives, and very much to their advantage, particularly in the eyes of one who has lived for some time, as was the case with us, wholly among the latter. [...] At last, after riding for five hours, I espied, high on the left bank of the river [i.e. the Khrami], symptoms not to be mistaken of the German colony: these were, regularly-built white houses, with good windows, doors, and ridge stone on the roof. I joyfully rode up, and found that this was Katharinenfeld.

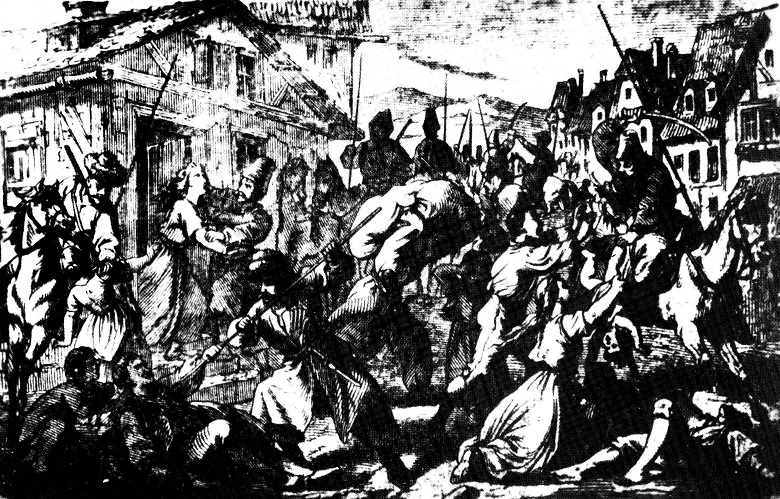
Attack on Katherinenfeld on 14 August 1826 during the Russo-Persian War

The colonies suffered during the Russo-Persian War of 1826–28. Many of the settlements had been raided by marauding Kurds in 1826 who, according to Parrot, killed 30 people of Katharinenfeld's 85 families and captured 130 more. Half of those had not yet returned at the time of the naturalist's visit in 1829. While visiting the great bazaar in Erivan (Yerevan) with Khachatur Abovian (the Armenian writer and national public figure), Parrot encountered "two Württemberg women, with five children" who "talked to one another in true Swabian dialect." They were from Katharinenfeld and Parrot resolved to tell their relatives back home about their location. When Parrot visited the village and told the colonists the news, he was very well received. The two women who he met in Erivan returned from comparably benign captivity with a "wealthy Tatar chief" where they had been pressured to convert to Islam. Parrot surmised that others might have been sold into slavery deeper into Turkish territory. Furthermore, he told of a case where a man received a letter from his wife who had married a Persian cleric in captivity and therefore allowed him to remarry.

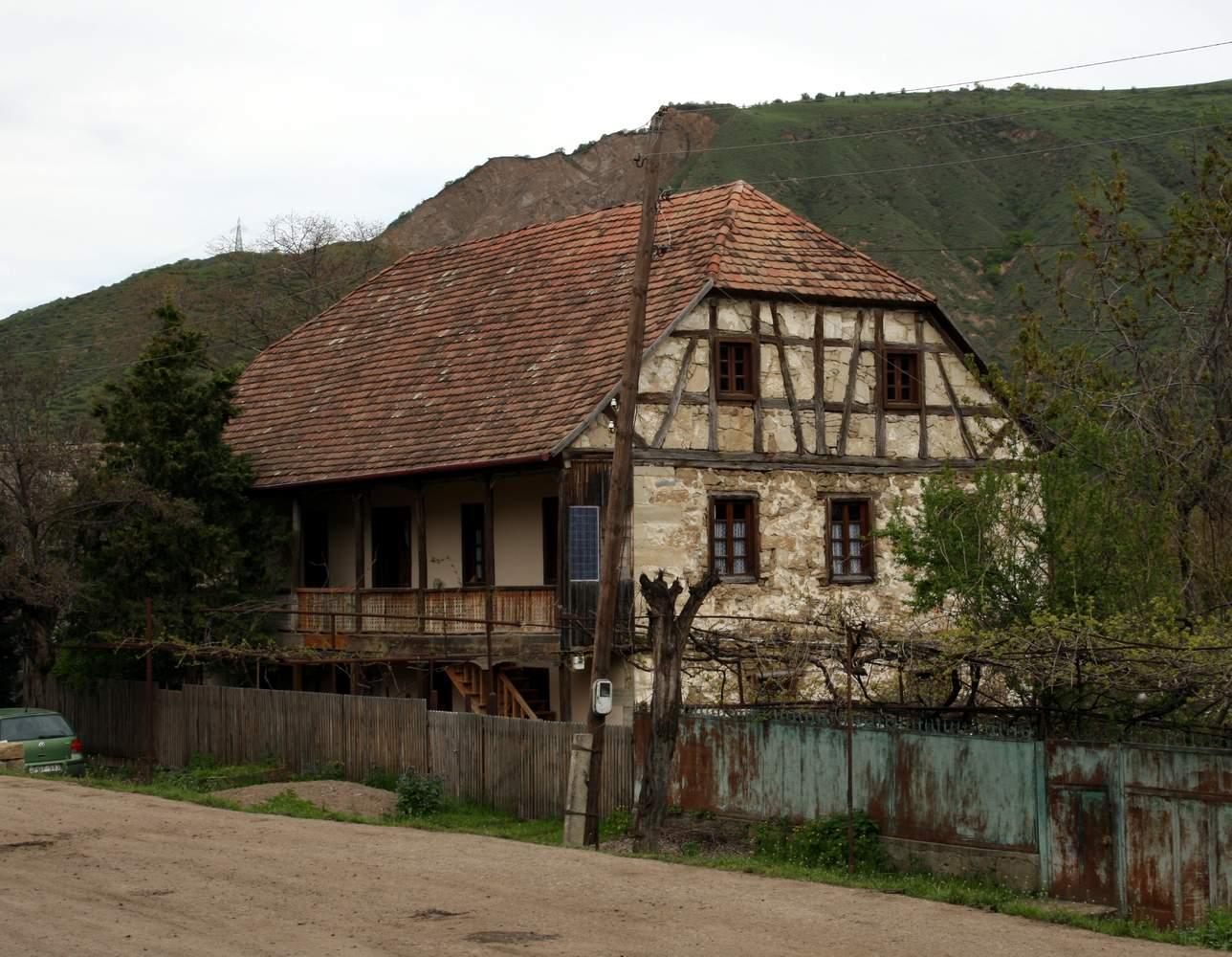
Typical half-timbered German house in Asureti, Georgia (historic Elisabethtal)

Some Germans moved voluntarily further south to Russian Armenia. Those who came from Württemberg were inspired by the concept of meeting the end of the world at the foot of Mount Ararat. On the invitation of Parrot, the Armenian writer Abovian attended the German-speaking University of Dorpat (Tartu) in present-day Estonia. He became a Germanophile and, after his return to the Caucasus, married a German woman, Emilia Looze, in Tiflis. They moved to Abovian's native Armenia and "established a complete German household."

During his travels to the Caucasus during the Russo-Turkish War of 1828–1829, the celebrated Russian poet Aleksandr Pushkin visited one of the German colonies near Tiflis and recorded his experience in his Journey to Arzrum. He ate dinner there, but was unimpressed by the food and the beer. "We drank beer which is made there, with a very unpleasant taste, and paid very much for a very bad dinner," he wrote.

In 1843, during his visit to Russian Transcaucasia, German Baron August von Haxthausen also visited the German colonies of Georgia and the Tiflis region and extensively described their agricultural practices. He related an account from Moritz von Kotzebue about an unsuccessful religious pilgrimage of German colonists to Jerusalem, led by a woman who "knew the whole Bible by heart, from beginning to end" and who "exercised a kind of magical influence on all around her." During his travels in the Caucasus, Haxthausen was accompanied by Peter Neu, a Swabian colonist from the Tiflis area who had "a remarkable genius for languages and knew a dozen European and Asiatic tongues,—German, French, Russian, Circassian, Tatar, Turkish, Armenian, Georgian, Persian, Kurdish, etc." In addition, he "possessed a rich gift of poetical imagination and had an inexhaustible treasury of märchen, legends and popular songs, gleaned from all the countries he had visited." Neu accompanied Haxthausen, Khachatur Abovian and Abovian's uncle Harutiun on a visit to the Yazidi community of Armenia. Haxthausen, Abovian and Neu also visited the center of the Armenian Apostolic Church at Etchmiadzin and Neu accompanied Haxthausen on an excursion to the area of present-day South Ossetia.

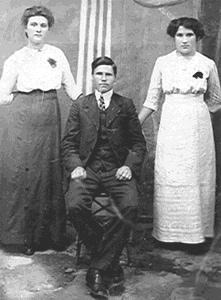
Germans from Helenendorf (present-day Goygol, Azerbaijan) in the 19th–early 20th century

=== Late imperial era ===
Additional German colonies were established in eastern Transcaucasia during the latter half of the 19th century and in the beginning of the 20th century. In the Tiflis Governorate as of 1926, a total of 9,000 Germans lived in the colonies of Alexandersdorf (now part of Didube, Tbilisi), Alexandershilf (now Trialeti), Blümenthal (later Chapaevka, now Kavta), Elisabetthal (now Asureti), Freudenthal (now part of Sartichala), Georgsthal (now Dzveli Kanda), Gnadenberg (now Dziguta), Grünthal (later Akhali Ulianovka, now Ruisbolo), Hoffnungsthal (now Akhalsheni), Katharinenfeld, Lindau (now Lindava), Marienfeld (now part of Sartichala), Marnaul (now part of Marneuli), Neudorf (now Akhalsopeli), Neu Tiflis (now part of Kukia and Chughureti, Tbilisi), Petersdorf (now part of Sartichala), Steinfeld (now Kotishi), Traubenberg (now Tamarisi), Waldheim (now Ipnari), and Wiesendorf (now Akhali Marabda).

Beginning in the 1880s, in addition to Helenendorf and Annenfeld, six more German colonies were formed the Elisabethpol Governorate: Georgsfeld in 1888, Alexejewka in 1902, Grünfeld and Eichenfeld in 1906, Traubenfeld in 1912 and Jelisawetinka in 1914. They became populated mostly by the descendants of the Germans from the two older colonies of Helenendorf and Annenfeld. By 1918 according to the German consul in Constantinople, there were 6,000 Germans living in these colonies overall. Helenendorf became the primary spiritual center for the Germans of the eight colonies. The oldest Lutheran church in present-day Azerbaijan, St. John's Church, was built in this town in 1857. Other Lutheran churches were built in Gadabay, Shamakhi, Elisabethpol, Baku and Annenfeld in 1868, 1869, 1885, 1897 and 1911 respectively. The ceremony of laying the first stone of Baku's German Church of the Saviour was attended by Emanuel Nobel, brother of Alfred Nobel, and other members of the city's elite.

Baku's booming oil industry attracted many people from all over the Caucasus. By 1903, the German population of the city had grown to 3,749 (2.4% of the city's entire population at the time) and consisted mostly of natives of the original German colonies. Nikolaus von der Nonne, an ethnic German who had been working in Baku since 1883, was the mayor of Baku from 1898 to 1902. Notably, Richard Sorge, the famous ethnic German-Soviet spy, was born in a suburb of Baku in 1895. His father was a German mining engineer who worked for the Caucasus Oil Company. Sorge is considered to have been one of the best Soviet spies in Japan before and during World War II and he was posthumously declared a Hero of the Soviet Union. The city of Baku dedicated a monument and park to him.

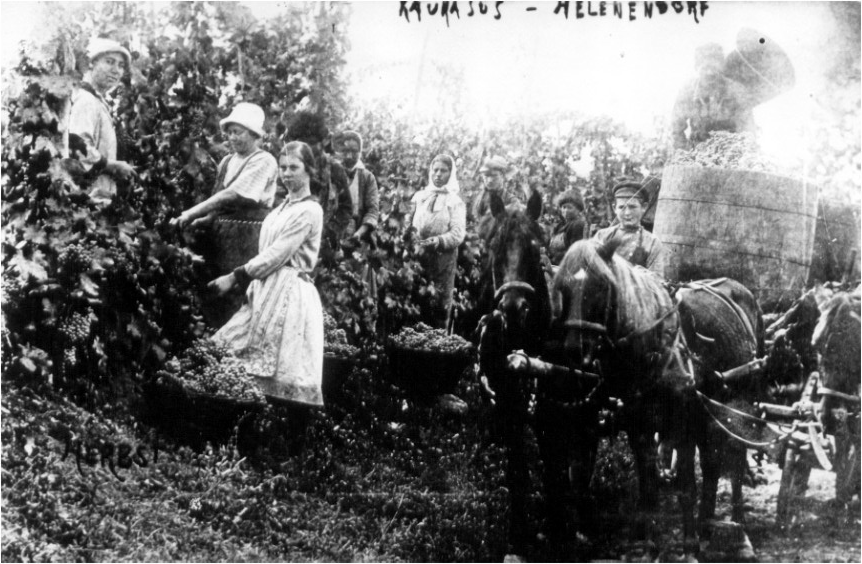
Grape gathering in Helenendorf (Goygol), c. 1900

Commonly referred to as nemsə or lemsə (from the Russian немец – "German") by the local Azerbaijani population, Germans in the Elisabethpol Governorate were traditionally engaged in farming. However, starting from 1860, viticulture was becoming more and more important in the life of the German agricultural communities. By the end of the 19th century, 58% of the region's wine production was manufactured by the Vohrer Brothers and the Hummel Brothers of Helenendorf.

In 1865 and 1883, Siemens built two copper smelteries in Gadabay and a hydroelectric station in Galakand. In the 1860s, it initiated cobalt extraction in Dashkasan and built two power stations in Baku. The Siemens smelteries were officially closed down in 1914 when the Russian Empire entered World War I fighting against Germany and the tsarist government banned all German businesses in Russia.

Following the Russo-Turkish War of 1877–1878, Imperial Russia annexed the Kars region from the Ottoman Empire. The tsarist government launched a campaign to populate the newly established Kars Oblast with perceived "reliable" populations, including Germans. In 1891, a number of German families were resettled in Kars from the colony of Alexandershilf near Tiflis and established the village of Petrovka. Its population remained relatively low and consisted of about 200 people by 1911. Another two colonies in the province, Vladikars and Estonka, were founded between 1911 and 1914. These settlements were short-lived. Due to the Russian-Ottoman military confrontation at the start of World War I, most of the remaining German settlers from the Kars Oblast were evacuated to Eichenfeld. The Kars region itself was eventually annexed by Turkey in the treaties of Moscow and Kars.

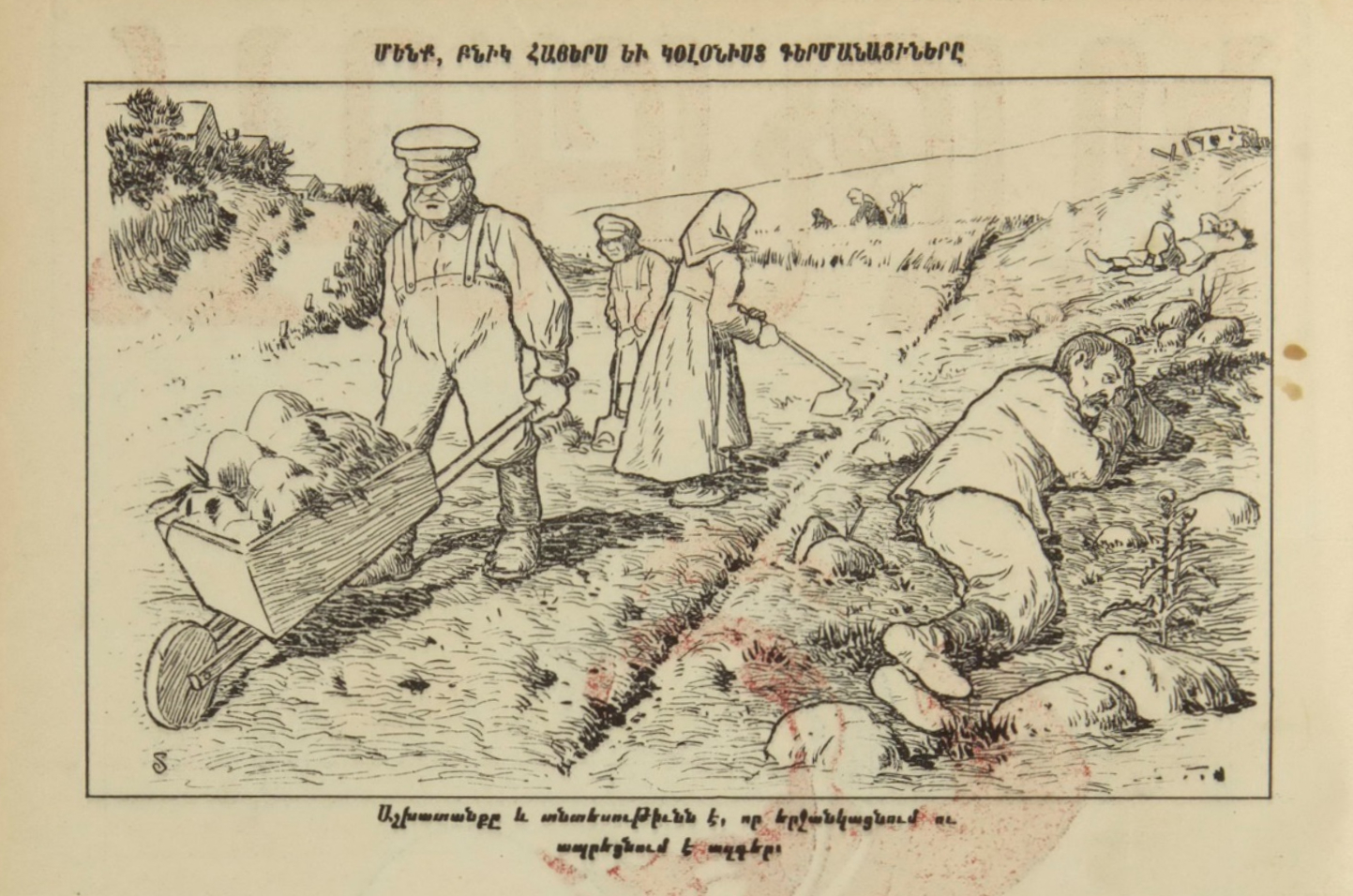
A cartoon on the perception of the German colonists with the headline "We, the local Armenians and the German colonists" from the Armenian satirical magazine Khatabala (1907, No. 43/71)

From 1906 to 1922, Baron Kurt von Kutschenbach published the German-language newspaper Kaukasische Post in Tiflis. It called itself the "only German newspaper in the Caucasus." The editor-in-chief was the writer, journalist and Caucasus scholar Arthur Leist.

After the outbreak of World War I, Russian government attempts to Russify the German colonies in the Caucasus created a local backlash. Following Russian Revolutions of 1917 and the formation of the Transcaucasian Federation, German colonists formed the Transcaucasian German National Council (Transkaukasischer Deutscher Nationalrat), with its seat in Tiflis. In May 1918, the Transcaucasian Federation dissolved and the short-lived republics of Georgia, Azerbaijan and Armenia were established. The German colonists strove to maintain their communities amid the upheaval of the Russian Civil War in the Caucasus. In the short-lived Azerbaijan Democratic Republic, the centenary of Helenendorf was marked by a public celebration within the community. The German community was also represented in the parliament of the republic by Lorenz Kuhn, a Helenendorf-born oil industry businessman.

=== Soviet era ===
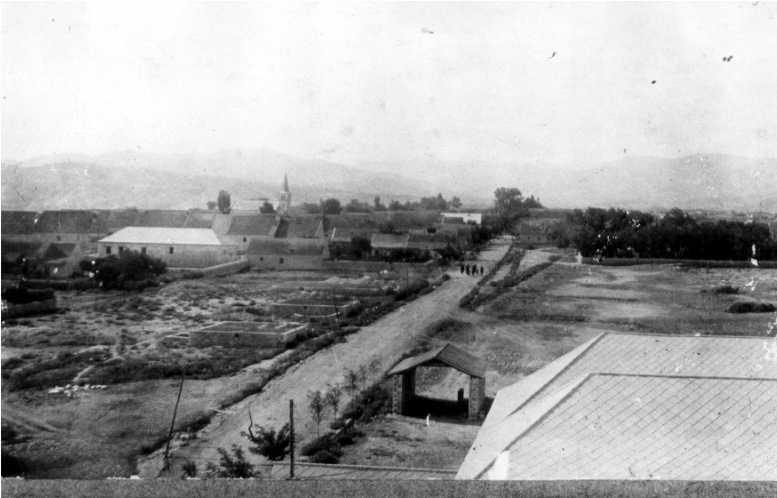
View on Annenfeld (within present-day Shamkir, Azerbaijan) ca. 1900

Following the victory of the Bolsheviks in the Russian Civil War and the Sovietization of the Caucasus, the new Soviet government initially demonstrated a favorable attitude toward multiculturalism in the era of the New Economic Policy (NEP). The cultural and linguistic rights of ethnic groups were promoted by Soviet authorities in accordance with the korenizatsiya (nativization) policy of Soviet nationalities. In 1926, there were seven public primary schools in Soviet Azerbaijan with German as the language of instruction. The First All-Union Census of the Soviet Union in 1926 showed that 93,915 Caucasus Germans lived in the North Caucasus region of the Russian SFSR. Within the Transcaucasian SFSR, 13,149 lived in the Azerbaijan SSR, 12,047 in the Georgian SSR and 104 in the Armenian SSR. The situation changed with the rise of Joseph Stalin. The Soviet government gradually ordered all German-sounding place-names to be changed by the mid-1930s. The forced collectivization of agriculture under the first five-year plan and the resulting famine of 1932-33 hit the North Caucasus and the local German community very hard.

After the invasion of the Soviet Union by Nazi Germany in June 1941, the Caucasus Germans were internally deported by Soviet authorities to Central Asia and Siberia on the pretext that their loyalties were with Germany, even though this was not the case. According to scholar Pavel Polian, most of the Caucasus Germans (approximately 190,000 people) were deported from the North and South Caucasus to Kazakhstan and Siberia from September 1941 to June 1942.

The deportees were allowed to take very little luggage, hardly any food and then had to undergo a voyage across the Caspian Sea to the camps of Central Asia. They were told the voyage would only be for several days but many ships went back and forth for months, resulting in mass death from starvation and the climate, especially among children, the elderly and the sick. On one ship carrying deportees, about 775 Germans froze to death. Evidently, maritime officials had no clear instructions to land the deportees at a particular destination and were prohibited from landing them anywhere else. They eventually arrived by rail in the Lake Balkhash area, in Kazakhstan. This torment can be ascribed, in part, to the confusion caused by the war, but also, more importantly, to the typical callous treatment of political prisoners by the Stalin regime, which did not care if prisoners lived or died. The following eye-witness report relates a harrowing story of evacuation by ship:

For two months ethnic Germans from the Caucasus were pointlessly dragged back and forth on the Caspian Sea, and more people, especially children, were dying of starvation. They were just thrown overboard. My four-year-old son was thrown there as well. My other son, seven years of age, saw that. He grabbed my skirt and begged me with tears in his eyes: 'Mummy, don't let them throw me in the water. I beg you, leave me alive, and I will always be with you and take care of you when I grow up'... I always cry when I remember that he also died of starvation and was thrown overboard, which he feared so much.

The only ones not subject to deportation were German women (and their descendants) who were married to non-Germans. Soon after Stalin's death in 1953 and the rise of Nikita Khrushchev to the Soviet leadership, the ban for the majority of the deported peoples to return to their homes was lifted. However, relatively few Germans returned to the Caucasus region. By 1979, there were only 46,979 Germans living in both North and South Caucasus.

=== History since 1991 ===
There has been renewed interest in the Caucasus German community in the post-Soviet states since the dissolution of the Soviet Union in 1991.

==== Bolnisi, Georgia ====
The 2014 census recorded only two Germans living in the Bolnisi municipality. The German town cemetery was leveled under Stalin and is marked today by a memorial honouring the memory of the German colonists. Recently, there has been increasing interest in Georgia on the part of local youth to find out more about their German heritage. Often this desire is closely related to Protestant beliefs, so as a result the New Apostolic Church works intensively with these young people as part of its regular youth programs.

==== Azerbaijan ====
In Azerbaijan, the remaining Germans are concentrated in the capital city of Baku, and many belong to the Evangelical Lutheran Community restored and officially registered in the early 1990s. The last German resident of Goygol (Helenendorf), Viktor Klein, died in 2007. The city has nowadays over 400 buildings whose construction dates back to the German period. In 2015, according to Klein's will, his familial house, built by his grandfather in 1886, was turned into the Museum of Caucasus German History. The former Lutheran church of Ganja has housed the Ganja State Puppet Theatre since 1986. In 2009, the non-functioning Lutheran church in Shamkir (and into which Annenfeld was absorbed), which had been used as a community centre in the Soviet era, was renovated and turned into a museum. Yunis Hajiyev, born in 1928 to an Azeri father and a German mother, and his descendants are said to be the last family of German origin still residing in Shamkir as of 2018. Gadabay's German population left by 1922 after the exhaustion of the copper industry. The Lutheran Church of the town was razed by the Soviet government in the 1920s.

==== Armenia ====
Already small compared to the historical German communities of the neighboring Georgia and Azerbaijan, Armenia's remaining German population declined following the country's independence in 1991 due to economic factors. Many of the country's Germans emigrated to Germany. In recent years, the German community has been working closely with the German Educational and Cultural Center of Armenia to help organize German-language schools and cultural events.

==== Turkey ====
In addition, the views of the Kafkas Postası (the newspaper of the Caucasian Germans between 1906 and 1914) about Turkey are also conveyed; for they show the Caucasian Germans' insight into one of their neighbors, the Ottoman Empire. At the end of this publication there is an addendum about a small branch of the Caucasian Germans near Kars and Ardahan, now in eastern Turkey, near Ararat. The last German resident of the Estonka colony (the present-day village of Karacaören in the Kars Province of Turkey), Frederik Albuk, died in 1999 in his native village, survived by his wife Olga Albuk of Russian-Estonian ancestry, who died there in August 2011. The 150-grave Lutheran cemetery where they were buried is the only remnant of the German community's presence in northeastern Turkey. Of the 60 families of Estonian origin who were settled in the village of Karacaören in the center of Kars by the Russians during the Ottoman-Russian wars in 1877, only August Albuk has survived.

== See also ==
- History of Germans in Russia and the Soviet Union
- Crimea Germans
- Volga Germans
- Lenins Weg
