= Bishops and archbishops of Bolnisi =

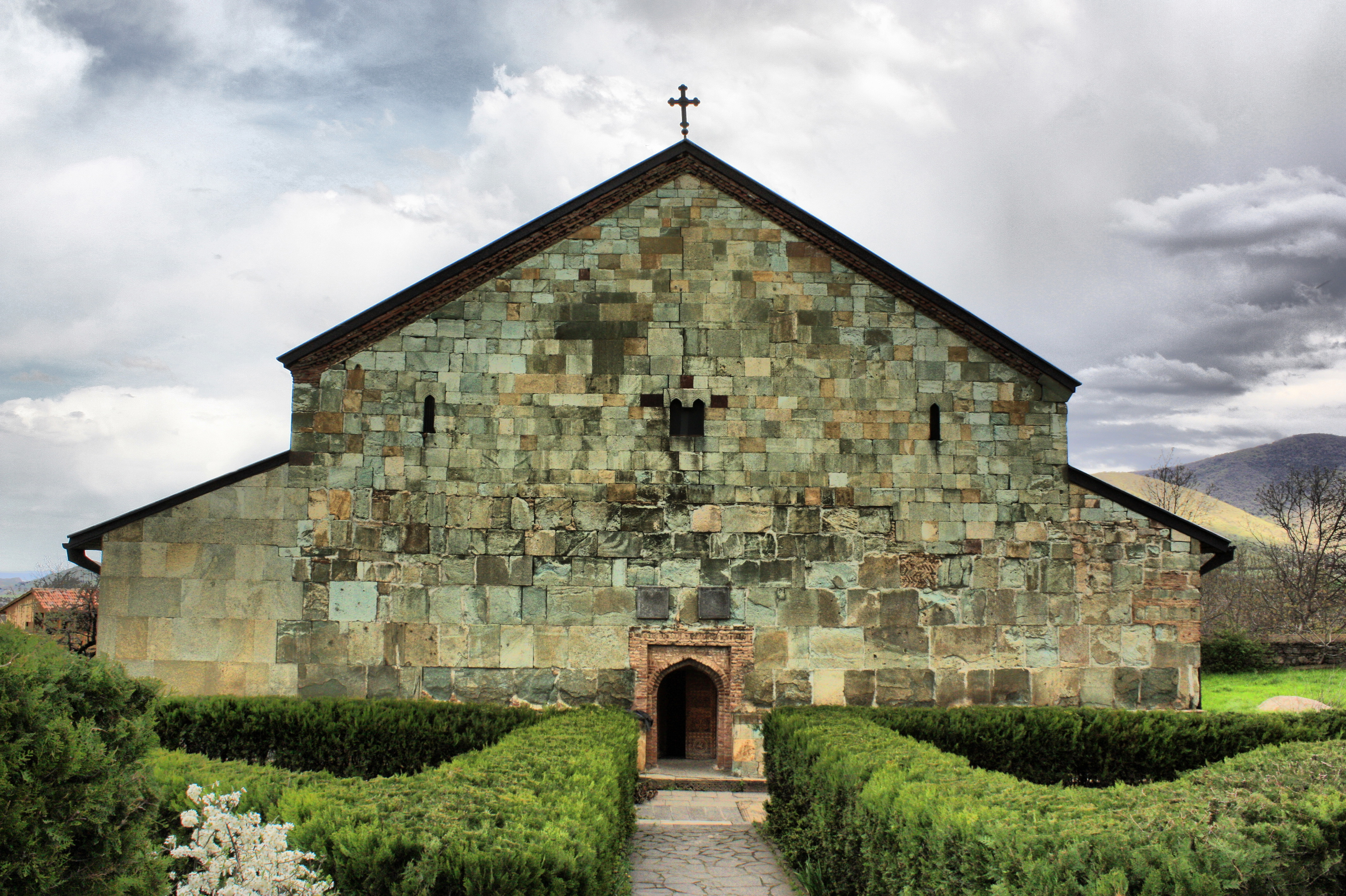
Bolnisi Sioni Cathedral, the oldest extant church building in Georgia and the seat of the bishops of Bolnisi

Bolnisi is a city in the country of Georgia, the capital of Bolnisi district, which has long been the seat of either a bishop or an archbishop.

Bolnisi has been a center of Georgian Christianity since early Christian times, being the site of an early and important monastery. The Bolnisi Cathedral was built in 478–493 under the rule of Vakhtang I of Iberia and is the source of the Bolnisi cross, which came to be a national symbol of Georgia.

In 2009, the Bishop of Bolnisi was summoned to Tbilisi and advised to see to it that the large number of crosses which had been erected around Muslim areas of Bolnisi as a provocation were removed, which he was partly but not entirely successful in doing.

== Bishops of Bolnisi ==
- c. late 5th century: David. Nothing is known of this person, but there is an ancient inscription in Bolnisi Sioni: "Christ, have mercy on David the Bishop with his congregation..."
- c. early 9th century: St. John of Khakuhli, a learned theologian, translator, and calligrapher was, according to some sources, Bishop of Bolnisi before moving to Khakuhli. Another manuscript casts this into dispute.
- 1748 or 1749–?: Timote Gabashvili. He was given the Diocese of Bolnisi by the Patriarch Anton. He was simultaneously Archbishop of Kutaisi, at least in title (in practice he had been deposed by the Turks).
- 21st century: Jegudiel (Georgian: ტაბატაძე, Tabatadze)
- Present (as of 2015): Ephrem (Georgian: გამრეკელიძე, Gamrekelidze).

== Archbishops of Bolnisi ==
- 1995–2004: Thaddeus (Georgian: თადეოზ, Tadeoz or Tadeozi; full name Mirian Ioramashvili) (born 1946). Thaddeus was ordained in 1977, elevated to bishop in 1979, archbishop in 1984, and metropolitan in 2003. He was Archbishop of Bolnisi from 1995 to 2004.
