= Bolnisi =

Bolnisi ბოლნისი
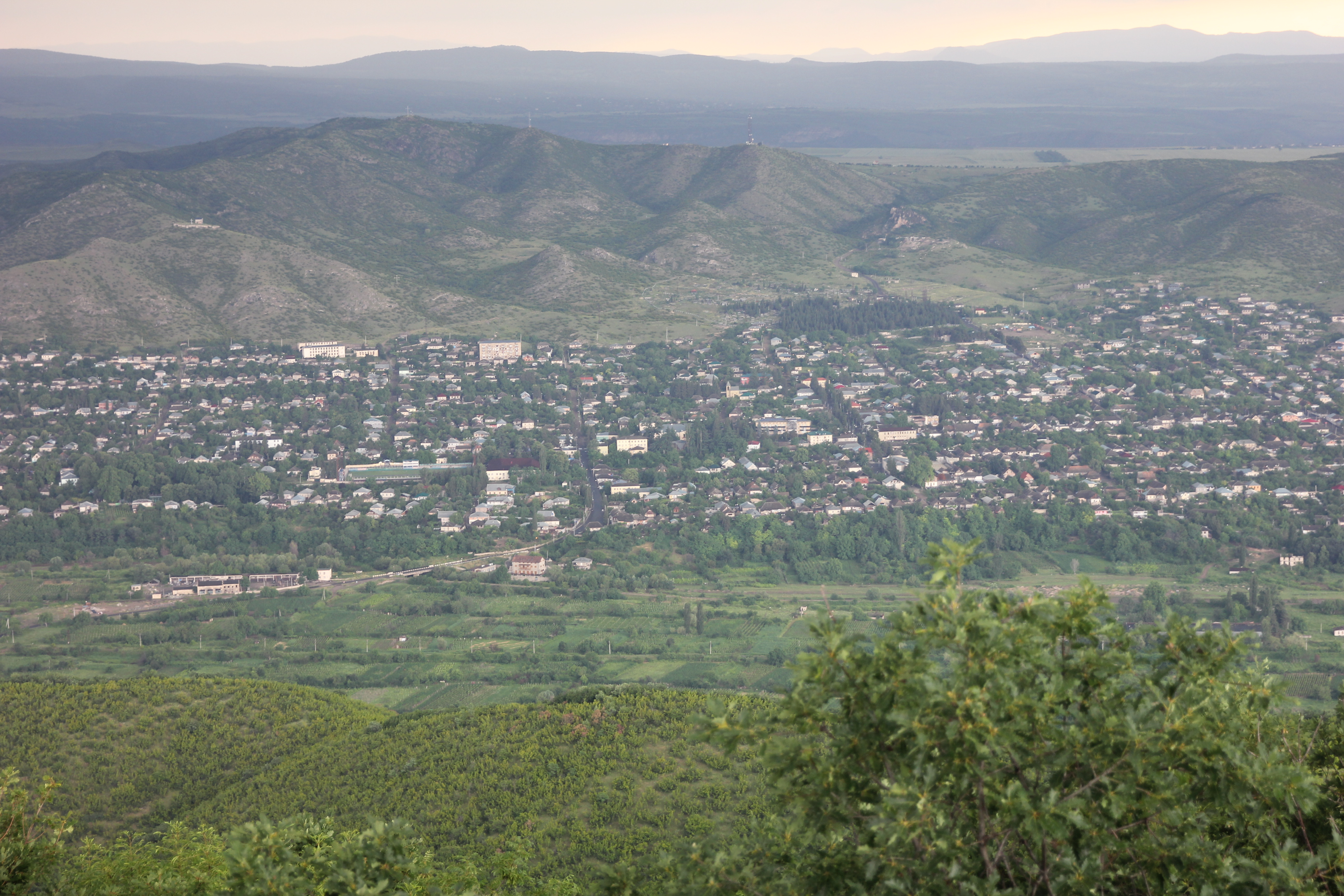

- Flag Seal
- Interactive map of Bolnisi
- Location within Georgia Location within Kvemo Kartli
- Coordinates: 41°27′N 44°32′E
- Country: Georgia
- Mkhare: Kvemo Kartli
- Municipality: Bolnisi
- Elevation: 420 m (1,380 ft)

Population (January 1, 2024)
  - Total: 8,348

Bolnisi (Georgian: ბოლნისი , Azerbaijani: Qəmərli) is a city in the country of Georgia, located in the Kvemo Kartli region and capital of the Bolnisi district. It currently has an estimated 8,348 inhabitants as of January 1, 2024.

== History ==
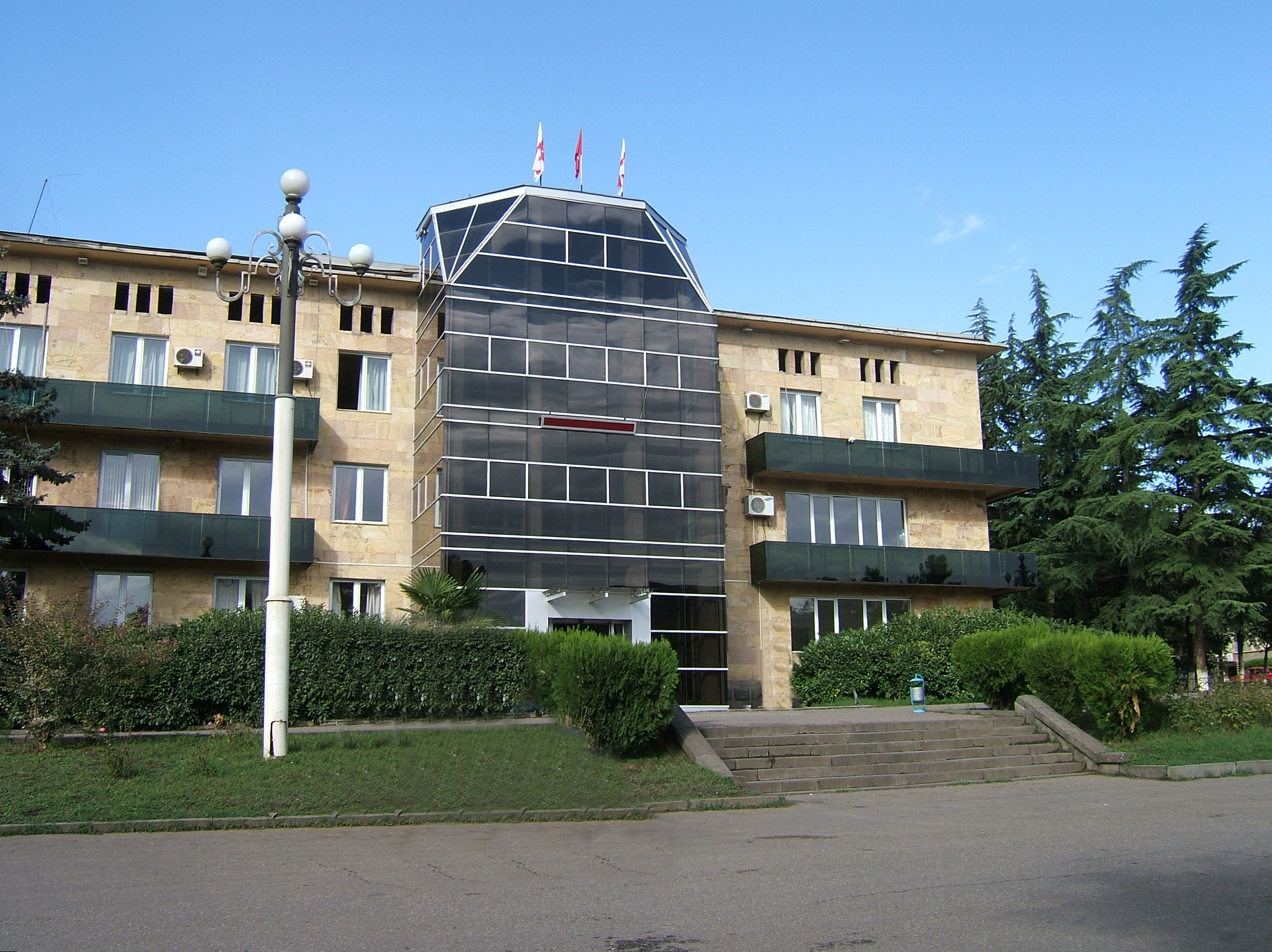
The town hall of Bolnisi

Bolnisi was settled by 95 German colonist families from Swabia in 1818, whilst part of the Georgia Governorate of the Russian Empire. Upon the arrival of the German colonists, the town was renamed Yekaterinenfeld in honor of the sister of Tsar Alexander I, Ekaterina Pavlovna, who was married to the King of Württemberg. Some eight years later, Yekaterinenfeld was pillaged by what were described as "Tartars", who burned down the German colony and massacred many of its inhabitants. In the early 20th century, Yekaterinenfeld had a mainly German and Russian population of 2,332.

Following the Russian Revolution and the Sovietization of Georgia in 1921, Yekaterinenfeld was eponymously renamed to Luxemburg (Russian: Люксембург) for the renown German communist Rosa Luxemburg. In 1941, in accordance with Stalin's callous policy on ethnic groups, all Germans residents of Luxemburg who were not married to ethnic Georgians were deported to Siberia and Kazakhstan. On 3 April 1943, the town was finally renamed to Bolnisi, which remained unchanged after the fall of the Soviet Union.

On 31 December 1967, the settlement of Bolnisi received the status of a city. In 1980, the city water supply network was built.

An airfield near the city was reported to have been bombed by Russia on August 8, 2008, during the Russia-Georgia war.

== Economy ==
The main occupations of the colonist Germans were viticulture, horticulture, fruit growing and cattle breeding. At the same time, irrigation, underground drainage and irrigation canals were constructed in Yekaterinenfeld, as well as wine, cognac and cheese factories, and leather and furniture factories. The town's contemporary economy is mostly agrarian with the notable exceptions of a winery, brewery, and a gold mine in the nearby village of Kazreti.

== Religion and Cultural Heritage ==
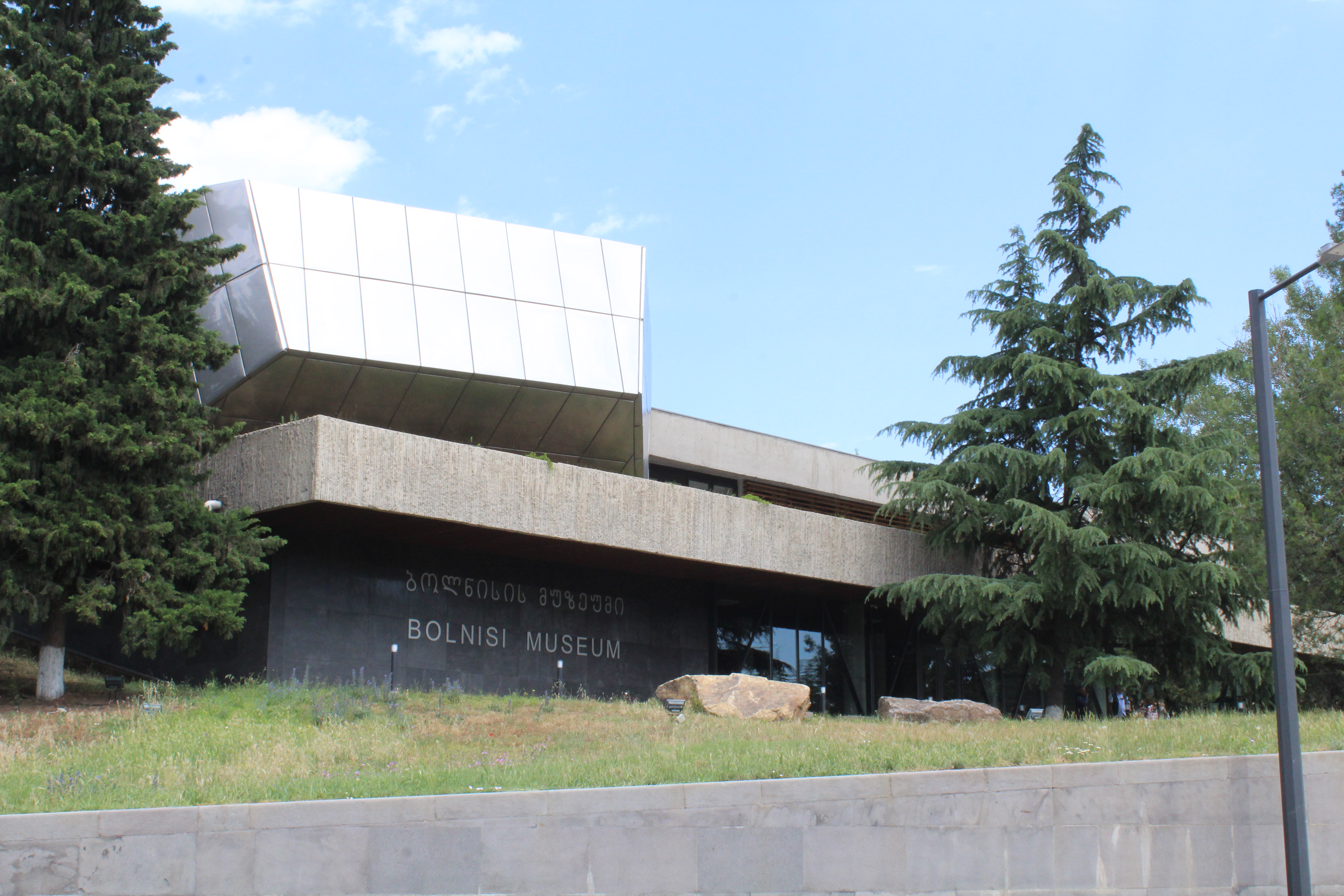
Bolnisi Museum

Bolnisi has long been the seat of a bishop or archbishop, and is the home of the oldest dated Christian structure in Georgia. It is known as Bolnisi Sioni (Sioni being Georgian for Zion and a designation used by many of their churches). This three-nave basilica church dates to the 5th century AD and features some pagan elements in its stonework. The original roof is missing but has been replaced with a modern covering.

A dedication Bolnisi inscriptions from the Bolnisi church, carved in the late 5th century, is one of the oldest dated specimens of Georgian writing. It mentions Bishop David of Bolnisi and two Sassanid kings Peroz I and Kavadh I.

There are still remnants of the German past in Bolnisi. A small graveyard and plaque acknowledges the German influence in the village. A small street called Mill Street has evidence of 19th-century German architecture and a few signs in the German language that date from the early 20th century.

The Bolnisi Museum, opened in 2020, showcases some findings from the nearby Dmanisi archaeological site, which is on the tentative list of UNESCO World Heritage sites, for the "richest and most complete collection of indisputable early Homo remains outside of Africa". Starting with these Dmanisi hominins, the exhibit also covers the Sakdrisi goldmine and contains a room on the German settlers, across four halls. The museum building was designed by Gaga Kiknadze. The concept of the exhibition was developed by Lina López. The Bolnisi Museum was nominated for the European Museum of the Year Awards in 2021.

== Sport ==
Whilst a German colony within the Russian Empire, Bolnisi had cycling, gymnast, and football teams in the 19th century.

Sioni Bolnisi, a football club founded in 1936, play at the Tamaz Stepania Stadium, named after local footballer Tamaz Stepania; they were league champions once in 2006.

Rugby Club Kochebi Bolnisi is a semi-professional Rugby Union team which currently plays in the top tier league in Georgia, the Didi 10.

== Geography ==
Bolnisi is located in the middle of the Mashavera river, 64 km from the capital of Tbilisi and 550 m above sea level. The highest recorded temperature was 40.2 °C (104.4 °F) on 31 July 2011, while the loowest recorded temperature was −14.8 °C (5.4 °F) on 8 January 2008. There is a railway station on the Marneuli-Kazreti line in Bolnisi.

=== Climate ===
Climate data for Bolnisi (1991–2020, extremes 1981-2020)
Month	Jan	Feb	Mar	Apr	May	Jun	Jul	Aug	Sep	Oct	Nov	Dec	Year
Record high °C (°F)	20.2 (68.4)	22.2 (72.0)	28.0 (82.4)	35.0 (95.0)	32.6 (90.7)	37.1 (98.8)	40.2 (104.4)	39.2 (102.6)	36.8 (98.2)	31.0 (87.8)	26.5 (79.7)	22.2 (72.0)	40.2 (104.4)
Mean daily maximum °C (°F)	7.0 (44.6)	8.4 (47.1)	13.0 (55.4)	17.9 (64.2)	22.9 (73.2)	28.0 (82.4)	31.2 (88.2)	31.3 (88.3)	26.0 (78.8)	19.4 (66.9)	12.4 (54.3)	8.2 (46.8)	18.8 (65.8)
Daily mean °C (°F)	1.9 (35.4)	3.1 (37.6)	7.3 (45.1)	12.0 (53.6)	17.0 (62.6)	21.7 (71.1)	24.9 (76.8)	25.0 (77.0)	20.0 (68.0)	14.1 (57.4)	7.4 (45.3)	3.3 (37.9)	13.1 (55.6)
Mean daily minimum °C (°F)	−1.7 (28.9)	−1.0 (30.2)	2.7 (36.9)	7.2 (45.0)	11.9 (53.4)	16.1 (61.0)	19.3 (66.7)	19.3 (66.7)	15.0 (59.0)	9.9 (49.8)	3.7 (38.7)	−0.3 (31.5)	8.5 (47.3)
Record low °C (°F)	−14.8 (5.4)	−14.6 (5.7)	−9.0 (15.8)	−6.3 (20.7)	0.6 (33.1)	6.0 (42.8)	9.6 (49.3)	9.0 (48.2)	4.5 (40.1)	−1.5 (29.3)	−7.2 (19.0)	−14.4 (6.1)	−14.8 (5.4)
Average precipitation mm (inches)	18.0 (0.71)	23.7 (0.93)	40.8 (1.61)	68.6 (2.70)	74.9 (2.95)	65.8 (2.59)	38.0 (1.50)	31.6 (1.24)	39.6 (1.56)	50.2 (1.98)	36.4 (1.43)	20.8 (0.82)	508.4 (20.02)
Average precipitation days (≥ 1.0 mm)	3.8	4.7	6.3	9.5	11.8	8.7	6.3	5.1	5.7	7.3	5.8	4.3	79.3
Average relative humidity (%)	70.2	69.2	67	69.3	70	65.4	60.5	58.3	64.6	70.9	72.9	71	67.4
Source: NCEI

== Demographics ==
Historical population
Year	Pop.	±% p.a.
1968	16,300	—
1989	15,047	−0.38%
2002	9,944	−3.14%
2010	12,650	+3.05%
2014	8,967	−8.24%
2024	8,348	−0.71%
Source: Population data (1989 and 2002) and 2014

== Gallery ==
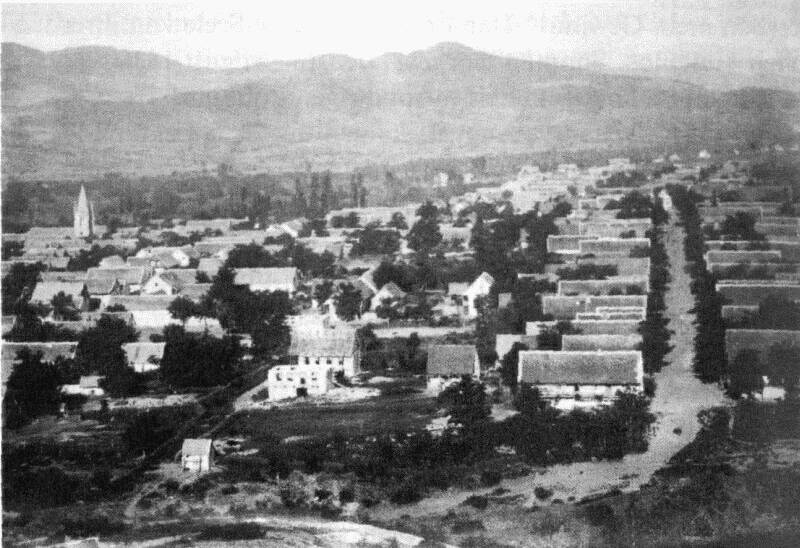
Old picture of Katharinenfeld in 1941

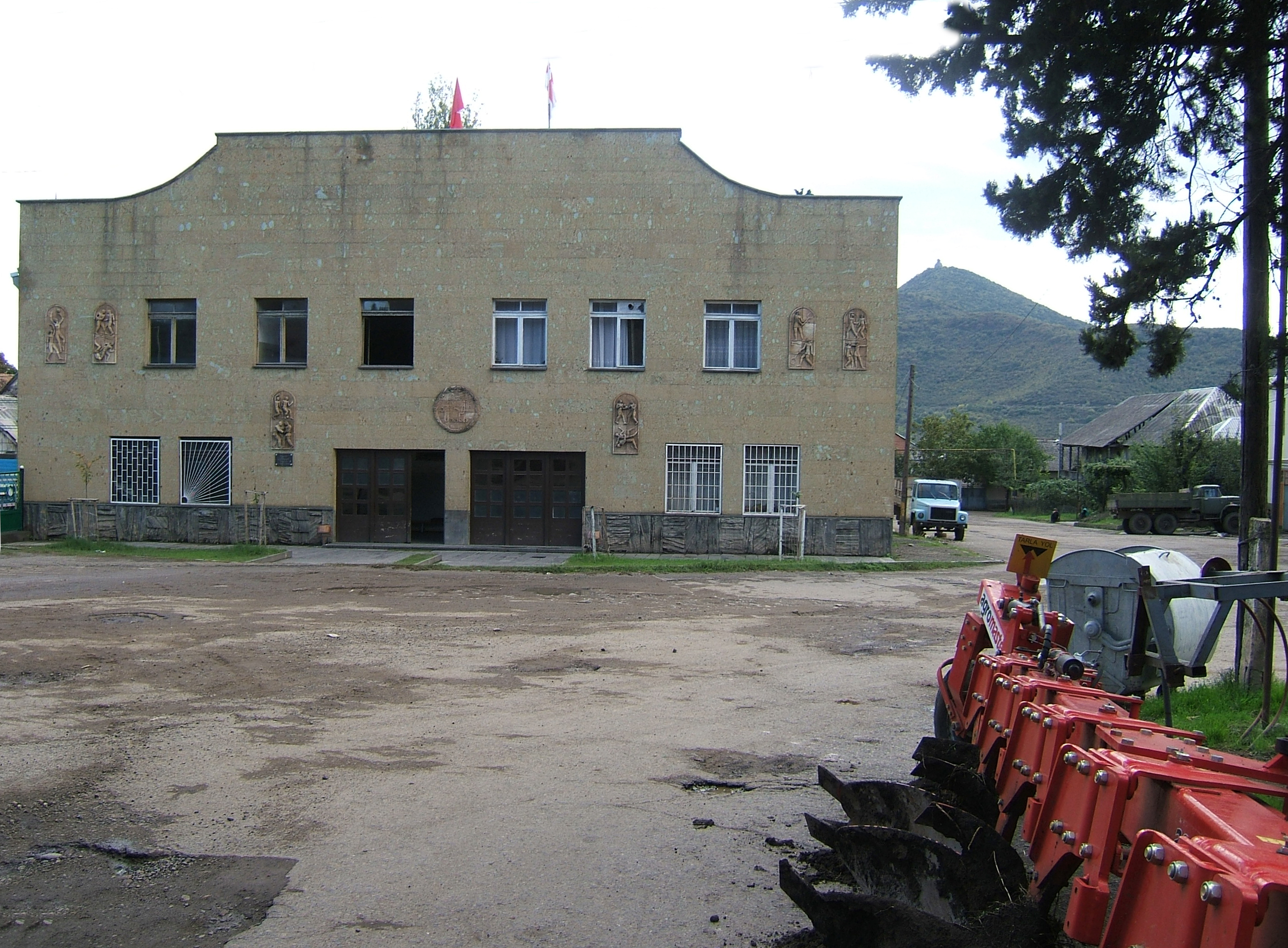
Old church of Katharinenfeld

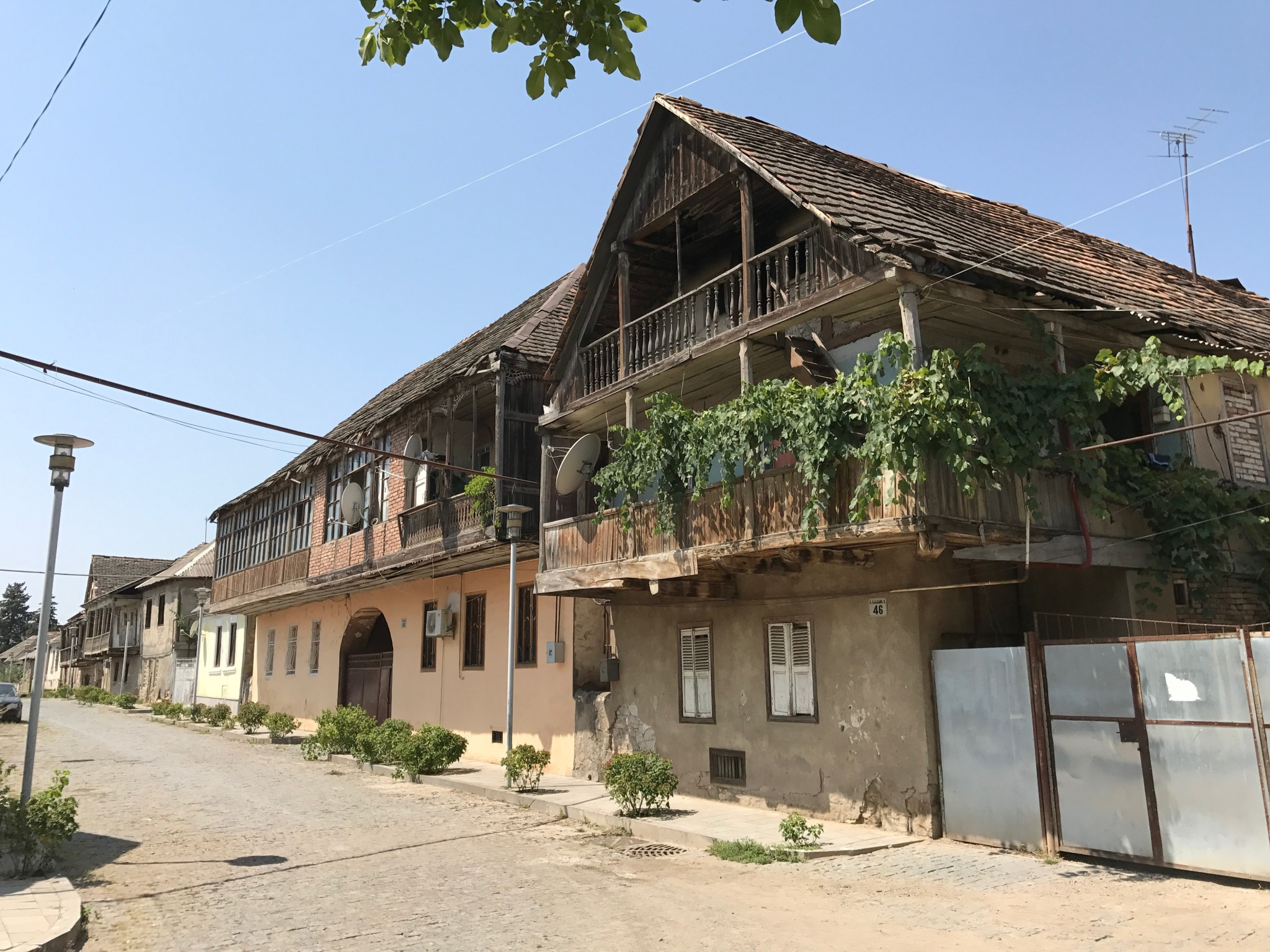
German houses in Bolnisi

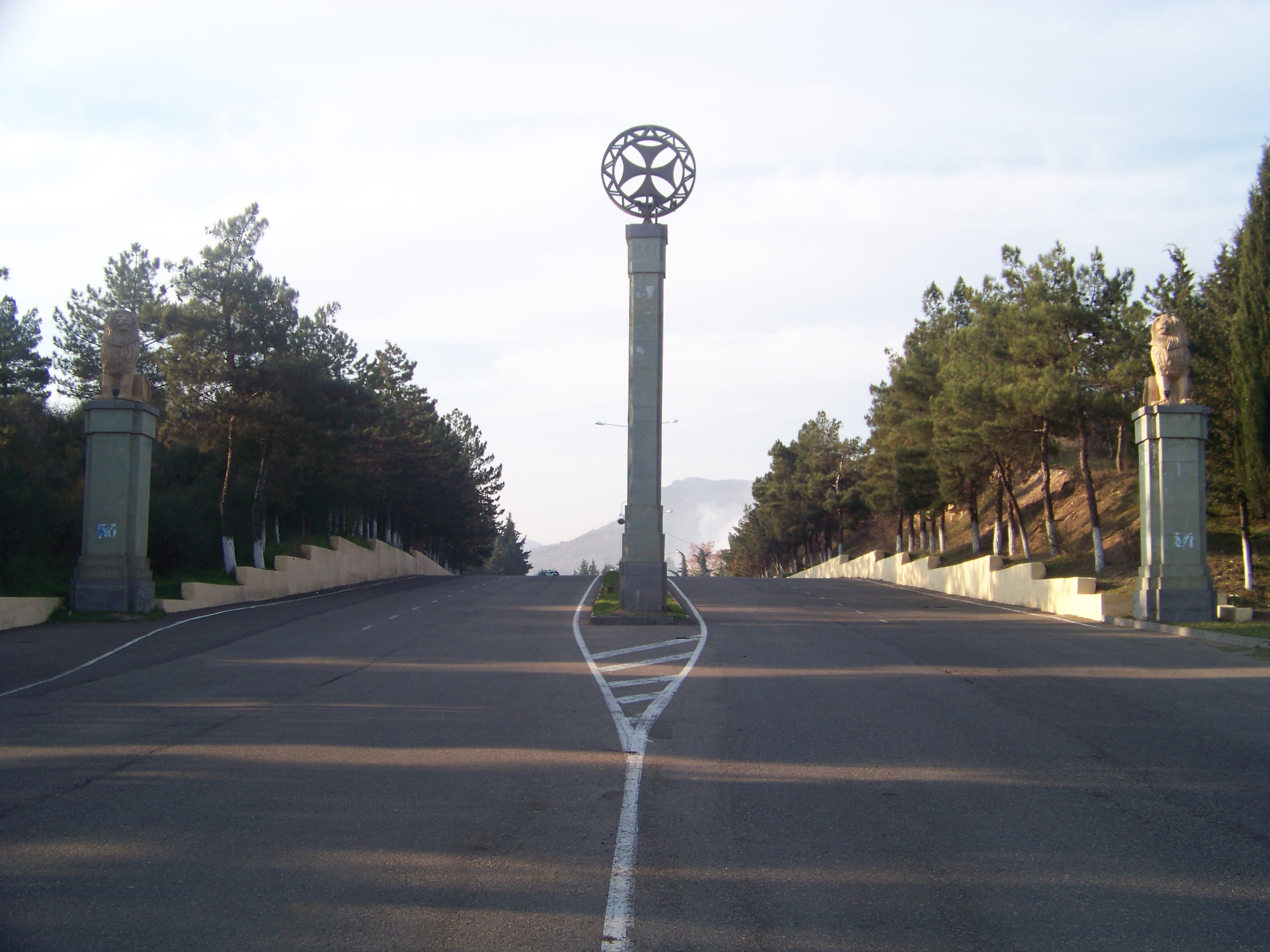
South entrance to Bolnisi

Koranti Church (1)

Korani Church (2)

== See also ==
- Bolnisi inscriptions
- Caucasus Germans
