= Alexeyevskoye Urban Settlement =

Alexeyevskoye Urban Settlement is the name of several municipal formations in Russia.

- Alexeyevskoye Urban Settlement, a municipal formation which the work settlement of Alexeyevsk and two rural localities in Kirensky District of Irkutsk Oblast are incorporated as
- Alexeyevskoye Urban Settlement, a municipal formation which the urban-type settlement of Alexeyevskoye in Alexeyevsky District of the Republic of Tatarstan is incorporated as

== See also ==
- Alexeyevsky (disambiguation)
