= Tamaz Stepania =

Personal information
- Full name: Tamaz Stepania
- Date of birth: 28 September 1950
- Place of birth: Bolnisi, Georgian SSR
- Date of death: 28 March 1972 (aged 21)
- Place of death: Gori, Georgian SSR
- Position: Goalkeeper

Youth career
- 1964–1968: Sioni Bolnisi

Senior career*
Years	Team	Apps	(Gls)
1968–1970	Dila Gori	2	(0)
1970–1972	Dinamo Tbilisi	27	(0)
- * Club domestic league appearances and goals

Tamaz (Temur) Stepania (Georgian: თამაზ (თემურ) სტეფანია) (born 28 September 1950 in Bolnisi; died 28 March 1972 in Gori) was a Georgian and Soviet football player.

Stepania died in a car accident at the age of 21.

Tamaz Stepania Stadium in his hometown Bolnisi is named after him.
