= Yevgeny Alekseyev =

Yevgeny Alekseyev may refer to:

- Evgeny Alekseev (basketball) (1919–2005), Russian basketball player and coach
- Evgeny Alekseev (chess player) (born 1985), Russian chess player
- Evgenii Alexeev (1946–1987), Russian botanist
- Yevgeni Ivanovich Alekseyev (1843–1917), Russian military leader and politician
- Yevgeni Viktorovich Alekseyev (born 1982), Russian footballer
- Yevgeniy Alexeyev (canoeist) (born 1977), Kazakhstani sprint canoeist
