= Kaukasische Post =

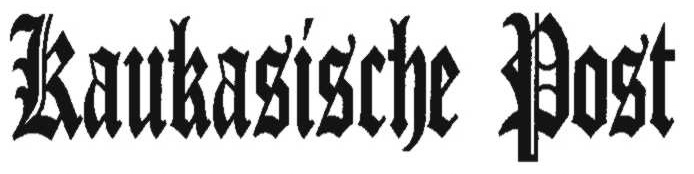
- Type: Bi-monthly newspaper
- Founder: Kurt von Kutschenbach
- Editor: Arthur Leist (original editor)
- Founded: 18 June 1906
- Ceased publication: 1921 (original run)
- Relaunched: October 1994
- Language: German
- Headquarters: Tbilisi, Georgia

The Kaukasische Post is a bi-monthly German language newspaper in Georgia in the Caucasus. The first issue was published on 18 June 1906 by Kurt von Kutschenbach and edited by the writer and journalist Arthur Leist in Tbilisi.

== History ==
It was published weekly on Sundays and was the only newspaper for the community of Caucasus Germans in the North Caucasus, in Georgia, Azerbaijan, Armenia, then part of the Russian Empire.

The publication was interrupted by World War I in 1914 and was only resumed in 1918. At German Caucasus expedition, the Germans revived the Die kaukasische Post newspaper that was quite anti-socialist. With the invasion of the Red Army into the Democratic Republic of Georgia the newspaper had to cease publication. In October 1994 the Kaukasische Post resumed publication and is since then published bi-monthly in Tbilisi and is the only German language newspaper in the Caucasus region.
