= Alexeyevsky =

Alexeyevsky (masculine), Alexeyevskaya (feminine), or Alexeyevskoye (neuter) may refer to:

- Alexeyevsky District, several districts in Russia
- Alexeyevskoye Urban Settlement, several municipal urban settlements in Russia
- Alexeyevsky (inhabited locality) (Alexeyevskaya, Alexeyevskoye), several inhabited localities in Russia
- Alexeyevskaya (Moscow Metro), a station of the Moscow Metro, Moscow, Russia

== See also ==
- Alexey
- Alexeyev
- Alexeyevka (disambiguation)
