= Valery Alekseyev =

Valery Alekseyev may refer to:

- Valery Alekseyev (anthropologist) (1929–1991), Soviet anthropologist
- Valery Alekseyev (footballer) (born 1979), Russian footballer
- Valery Alexeev (mathematician) (born 1964), American mathematician and academic
