= Arthur Leist (writer) =

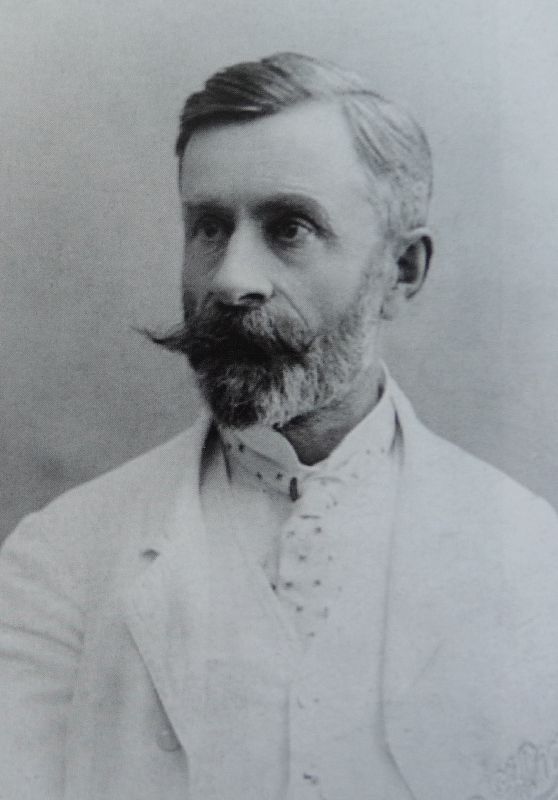
Arthur Leist

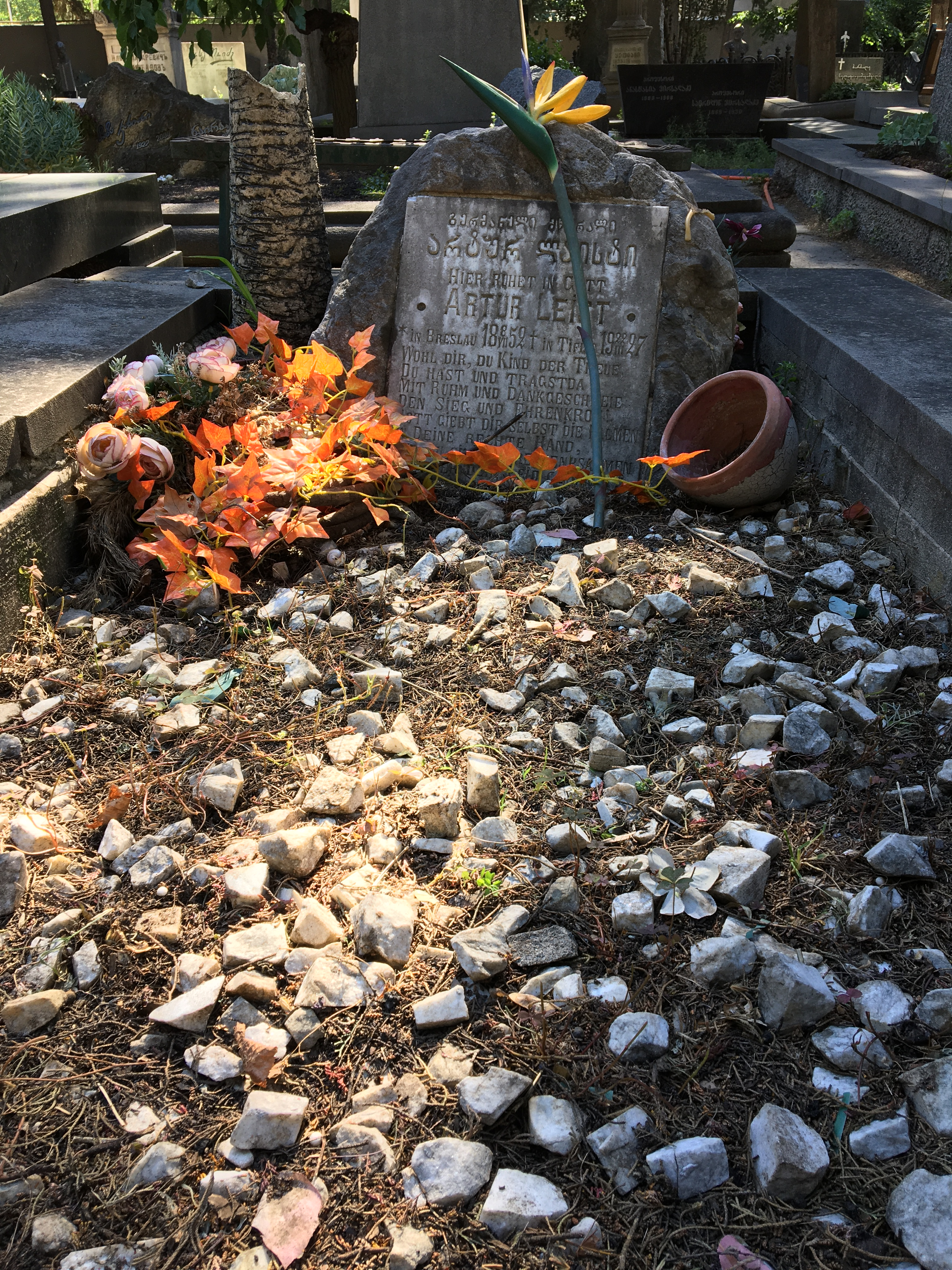
The grave of Arthur Leist in Didube Pantheon in Tbilisi.

Arthur Leist (8 July 1852 – 22 March 1927) was a German writer, journalist and translator of Georgian and Armenian literature.

He was born and educated at Breslau. During the Russo-Turkish War (1877–1878), he got interested in the Caucasus. After his three visits to Georgia between 1884 and 1892, Leist decided to permanently settle in Tiflis. He regularly wrote on the history, ethnography and culture of Georgia, and translated many pieces of classic Georgian and Armenian literature. He compiled the first anthology of Georgian poetry in German in 1887 and, with the help of the Georgian writer Ilia Chavchavadze, published the complete German translation of the medieval Georgian epic poem The Knight in the Panther's Skin by Shota Rustaveli in 1889. From 1906 to 1922, he edited Kaukasische Post, the only newspaper of the Caucasian German community. He died in Tiflis and was buried at the Didube Pantheon.

== Works ==
- Georgien: Natur, Sitten und Bewohner. W. Friedrich, Leipzig 1885
- Litterarische Skizzen. W. Friedrich, Leipzig 1886 (Hrsg. Abgar Johannissiany)
- Drei Erzählungen von Raphael Patkanian. W. Friedrich, Leipzig 1886
- Georgische Dichter. W. Friedrich, Leipzig, 1887
- Armenische Dichter. E. Pierson, Dresden 1898
- Schota Rustaweli: Der Mann Im Tigerfelle (translation) E. Pierson, Dresden 1898
- Das Georgische Volk. E. Pierson, Dresden, 1903
- Kacheti. Tiflis, 1927
- Sakartvelos guli, Tbilisi 1963
- Das Bildungsstreben der Georgier und Armenier. In: Gazeta Polska, Nr. 66, 1882
- Eine vergessene Literatur. In: Magazin für die Literatur des In- und Auslandes, 20.1.1883
- Kolchidaschi, In: Iveria, Nr. IV-V, 1885, S. 164–211
- Georgische Sprichwörter. In: Aus fremden Zungen, Nr. 9, 1900
