= Yevgeni Viktorovich Alekseyev =

Russian footballer

Yevgeni Alekseyev
Personal information
- Full name: Yevgeni Viktorovich Alekseyev
- Date of birth: 21 July 1982 (age 44)
- Height: 1.81 m (5 ft 11 1/2 in)
- Position: Midfielder

Senior career*
Years	Team	Apps	(Gls)
2003–2006	FC Metallurg Krasnoyarsk	96	(5)
2007	FC Sibiryak Bratsk	26	(2)
2008–2009	FC Metallurg Krasnoyarsk	30	(2)
2010	FC Metallurg-Kuzbass Novokuznetsk	13	(0)
2010	FC Sibiryak Bratsk	10	(0)
2011–2015	FC Restavratsiya Krasnoyarsk		
- * Club domestic league appearances and goals

Yevgeni Viktorovich Alekseyev (Russian: Евгений Викторович Алексеев; born 21 July 1982) is a former Russian professional football player.

== Club career ==
He played in the Russian Football National League for FC Metallurg Krasnoyarsk in 2006.
