= Valentin Alekseyev =

Soviet historian (1942-1994)

Valentin Mikhaylovich Alekseyev (Russian: Валентин Михайлович Алексеев; 1924–1994) was a Soviet historian from St. Petersburg. His major works could not pass censorship during the Soviet times and their publications began only during the perestroika times, although they had circulated in samizdat.

The Hungarian government awarded Alekseyev with the Imre Nagy Medal for his book Hungary-56.

== Bibliography ==
- The Warsaw Uprising. Warsaw in the Struggle against the Hitlerist Occupiers ("Варшавское восстание: Варшава в борьбе против гитлеровских захватчиков, 1939–1945") 1999, Moscow, Akademichesky Projekt, ISBN 5-7331-0155-5
- The Warsaw Ghetto No Longer Exists (Варшавского гетто больше не существует), Publication Program of the Memorial Society, Moscow, Zvenya Publishers, 1998, 159pp. (Book review in Novy Mir, 1999, no.3 (in Russian))
- Hungary-56: The Breach in the Chain "Венгрия-56. Прорыв цепи", Moscow, Nezavisimaya Gazeta, 1996. (in Russian)
- Czechoslovak Expedition is not Completed Yet (Чехословацкий поход еще не завершен) In: Погружение в трясину: Анатомия застоя. М. Progress Publishers, 1991. pp. 187–208 (in Russian)
- Thirteen Years' War: Teacher's Guide (Тридцатилетняя война: Пособие для учителя), Leningrad, Uchpedgiz, 1961. 183 pp. (in Russian)
