= Bolnisi Sioni =

Orthodox Christian basilica in Bolnisi, Georgia

Bolnisi Sioni ბოლნისის სიონი
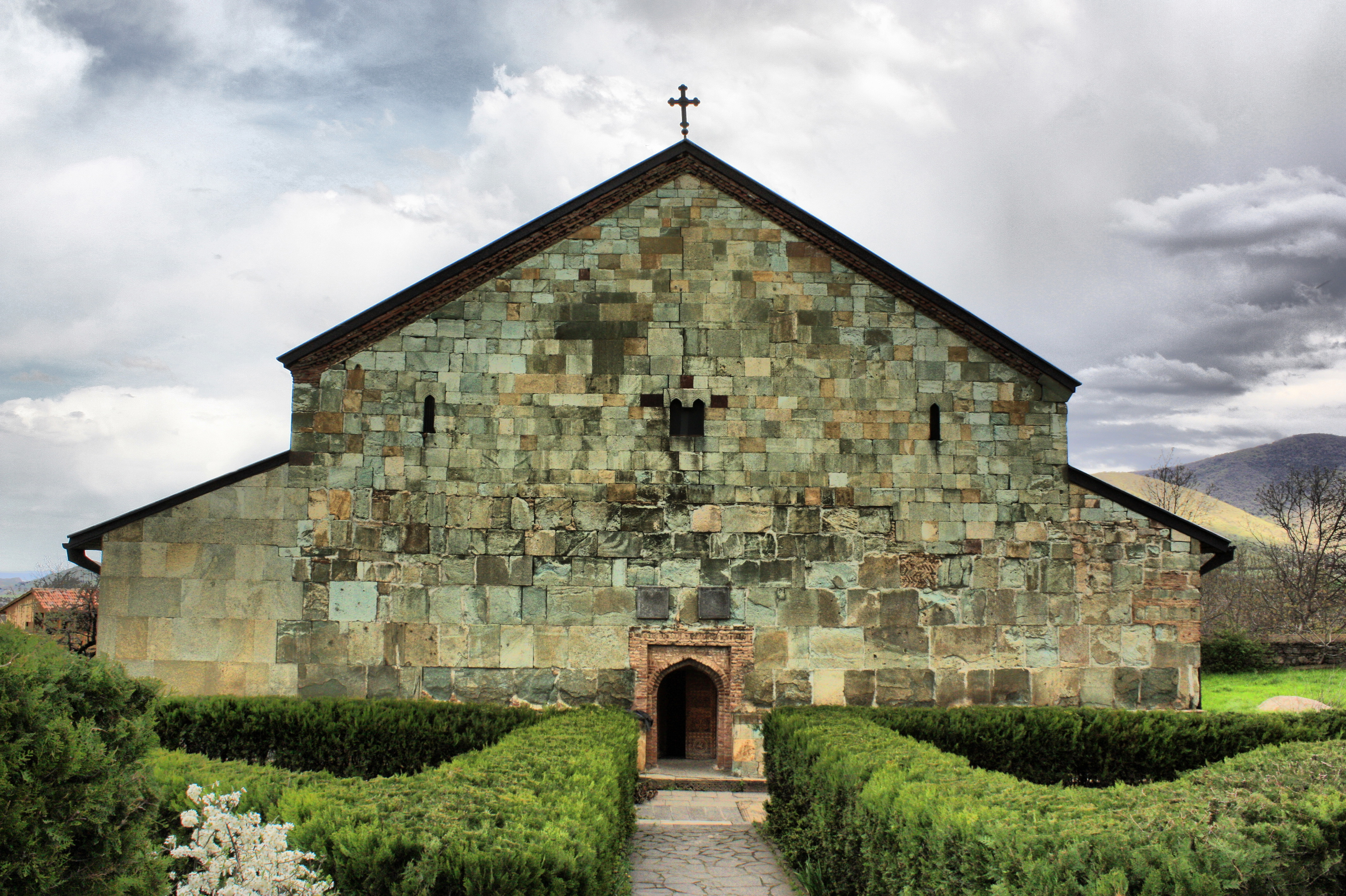
- Bolnisi Sioni Cathedral

- Location within Georgia Location within Kvemo Kartli

Religion
- Affiliation: Georgian Orthodox Church

Location
- Location: Bolnisi, Kvemo Kartli Province (Mkhare), Georgia
- Coordinates: 41.388889°N 44.5125°E

Architecture
- Style: Georgian
- Completed: 478–493

Bolnisi Sioni (Georgian: ბოლნისის სიონი) or Bolnisi Sioni Cathedral is a Georgian Orthodox basilica in the Bolnisi village of Bolnisi District, Georgia. The cathedral was built in 478–493. It is the oldest extant church building in Georgia.

Bolnisi Sioni Cathedral is known for the Bolnisi inscriptions in Georgian. These are one of the oldest historical documents of the Georgian alphabet. This church is the first Georgian building to have a completion date on the exterior. Bolnisi Sioni’s decorative scheme was a Sasanian style. The southern and central parts of the church are adorned with curling vine scrolls, arabesques, and foliate motifs. Uniform masonry blocks were used to build on to the original building’s Late Antiquity remnants on the southern façade.

The country of Georgia was in contact with Persia during the time of Bolnisi Sioni’s construction. Evidence of this is in the decoration of the building. The sculpture and embellishments of Bolnisi Sioni and other surrounding Georgian churches are influenced from Iranian, Armenian, and Near Eastern art and architecture.

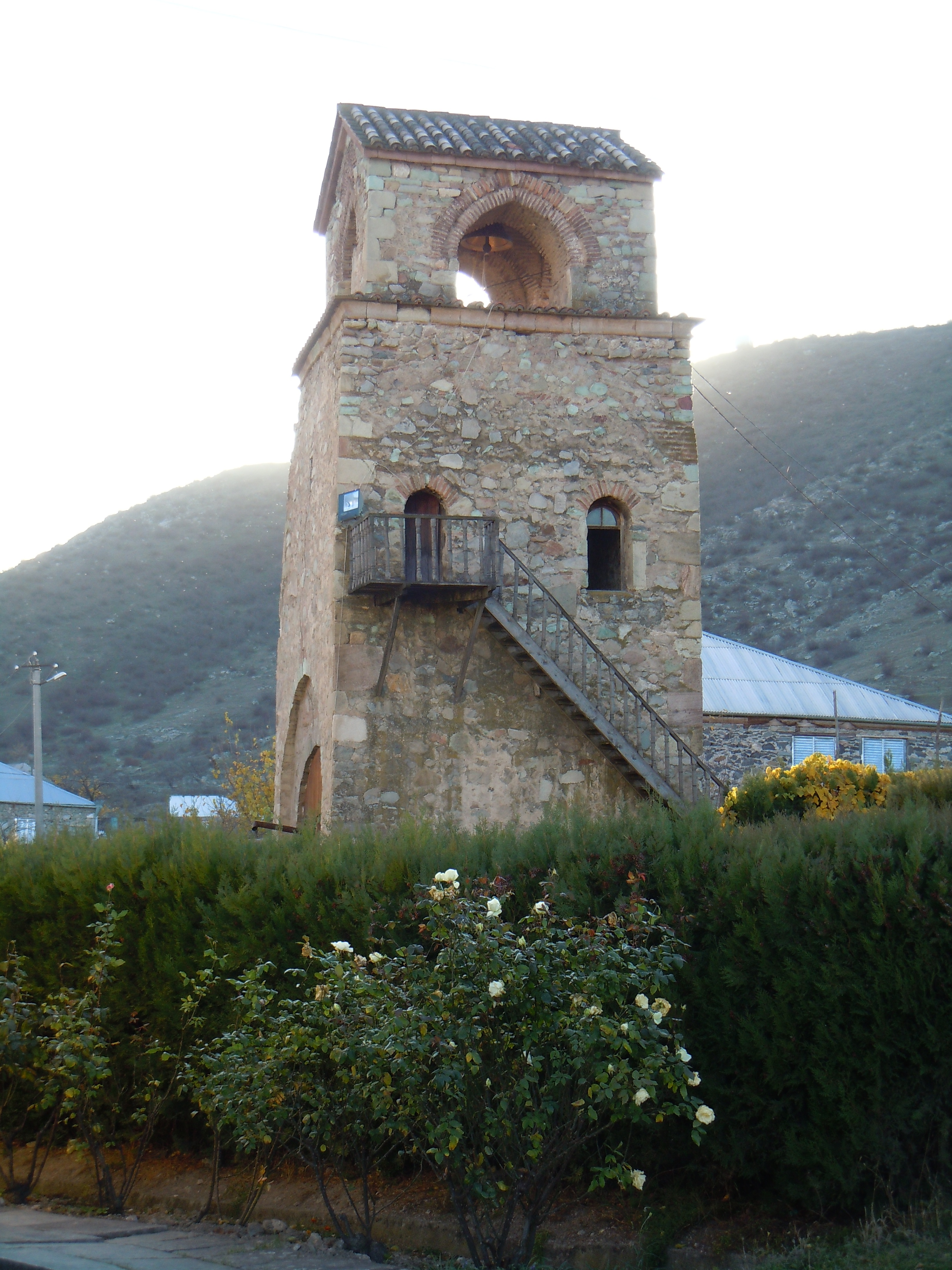
Bolnisi Sioni bell-tower.

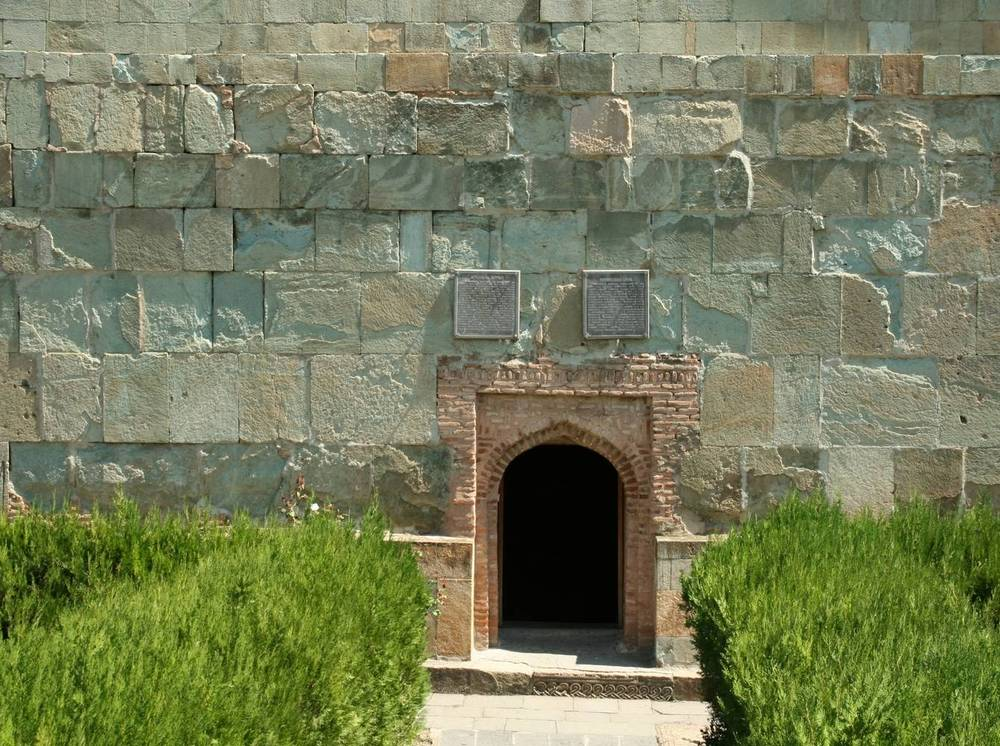
Church façade and exterior portal.

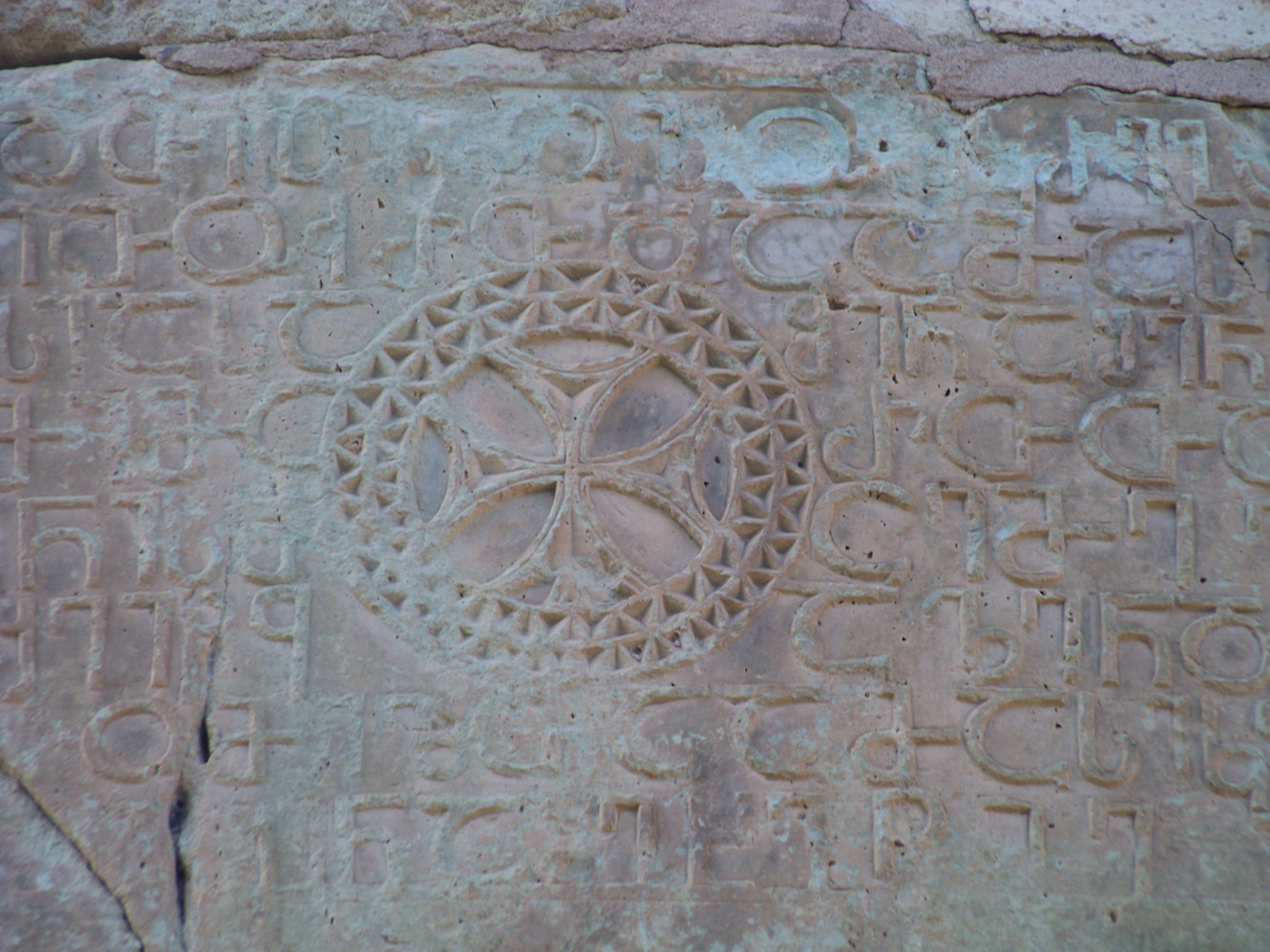
Early inscription

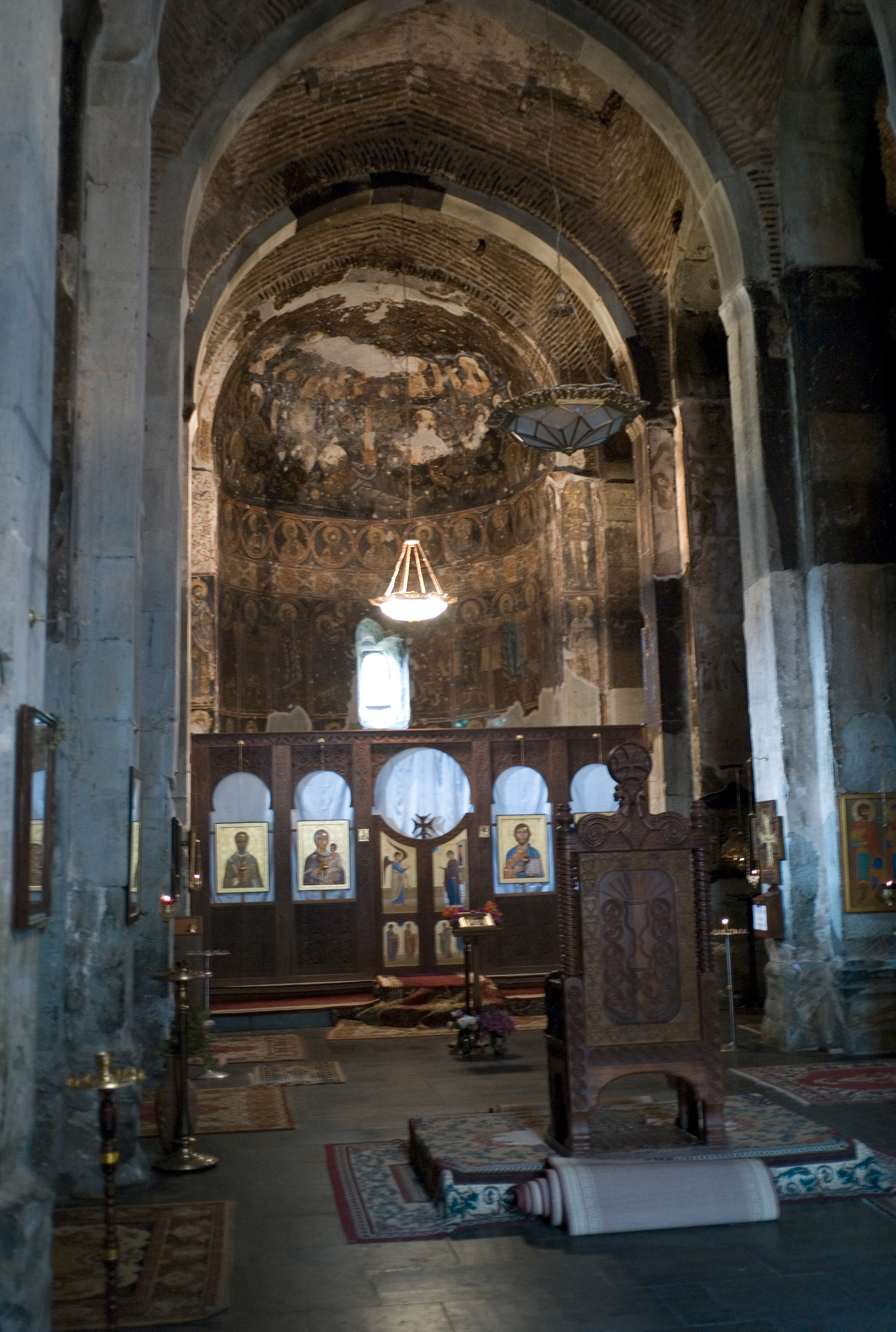
Interior of Bolnisi Sioni.

== Bibliography ==
- V. Beridze, Georgian Soviet Encyclopedia, 2, Tbilisi, 1977, p. 454
- Sh. Amiranashvili, History of Georgian Art, Tbilisi, 1971, pp. 113–118
- V. Beridze, Bolnisi Sioni // fresco, No. 2, 1968, pp. 23–25
