= Kirill Alexeyev =

Russian ice hockey player

- Born: February 27, 1981 (age 44) Apatity, Russia
- Height: 6 ft 1 in (185 cm)
- Weight: 216 lb (98 kg; 15 st 6 lb)
- Position: Defence
- Shot: Left
- Played for: RSL; Amur Khabarovsk; Novosibirsk Sibir; KHL; HC Sibir Novosibirsk; Khimik Voskresensk; UHL; Kalamazoo Wings; Flint Generals
- NHL draft: Undrafted
- Playing career: 2002–2013

Kirill Alexeyev, also transliterated as Alexeev, (born 27 February 1981) is a Russian former professional ice hockey player.

Following five seasons in the Quebec Major Junior Hockey League, Alexeyev played briefly in the United Hockey League with both the Kalamazoo Wings and Flint Generals before making his Russian Superleague debut with Amur Khabarovsk during the 2002–03 season.

He made his Kontinental Hockey League (KHL) debut with HC Sibir Novosibirsk during the 2008–09 KHL season.
