= Alekseyevka, Khachmaz =

Alekseyevka
- Municipality
- Location within Azerbaijan
- Coordinates: 41°29′22″N 48°39′51″E
- Country: Azerbaijan
- Rayon: Khachmaz

Population
  - Total: 1,373
- Time zone: UTC+4 (AZT)
  - Summer (DST): UTC+5 (AZT)

Alekseyevka is a village and municipality in the Khachmaz Rayon of Azerbaijan. It has a population of 1,373.
