= Svetlana Alekseeva (model) =

Russian model

Svetlana Alekseeva (born 1999 or 2000, professional name Sveta Ugolyok) is a Russian model.

== Fire accident ==
When she was four years old she suffered burns over 50% of her body. Her mother had left her alone in the house, and the child tried to burn off loose threads from her nightdress with a candle in the way she had seen her mother doing. The nightdress was of synthetic fabric and caught fire, fusing to her skin. She was in a coma for two months, and remained scarred from the burns. Her mother, an alcoholic, did not visit her in hospital, and subsequently neglected her. Alekseeva spent part of her childhood in an orphanage, and suffered bullying because of her appearance. At the age of 18 she said "If society puts pressure on you and is bullying you just because you have some individuality, this doesn't mean they're right".

She is developing a career as a photographic model despite her scars.

In 2018 she was one of the BBC's 100 Women, a list of "inspiring and influential" women. The listing said "Svetlana survived a fire that burned almost half her body and now works to help people with scars feel positive about their bodies."

== Child prostitution survivor ==
In January 2022, an article in the online magazine Baza revealed Alekseeva's history as a survivor of a child prostitution ring in Komsomolsk-on-Amur, as well as her ongoing attempts to bring the perpetrators to justice.
