= Alekseyevka, Quba =

Alekseyevka
- Municipality
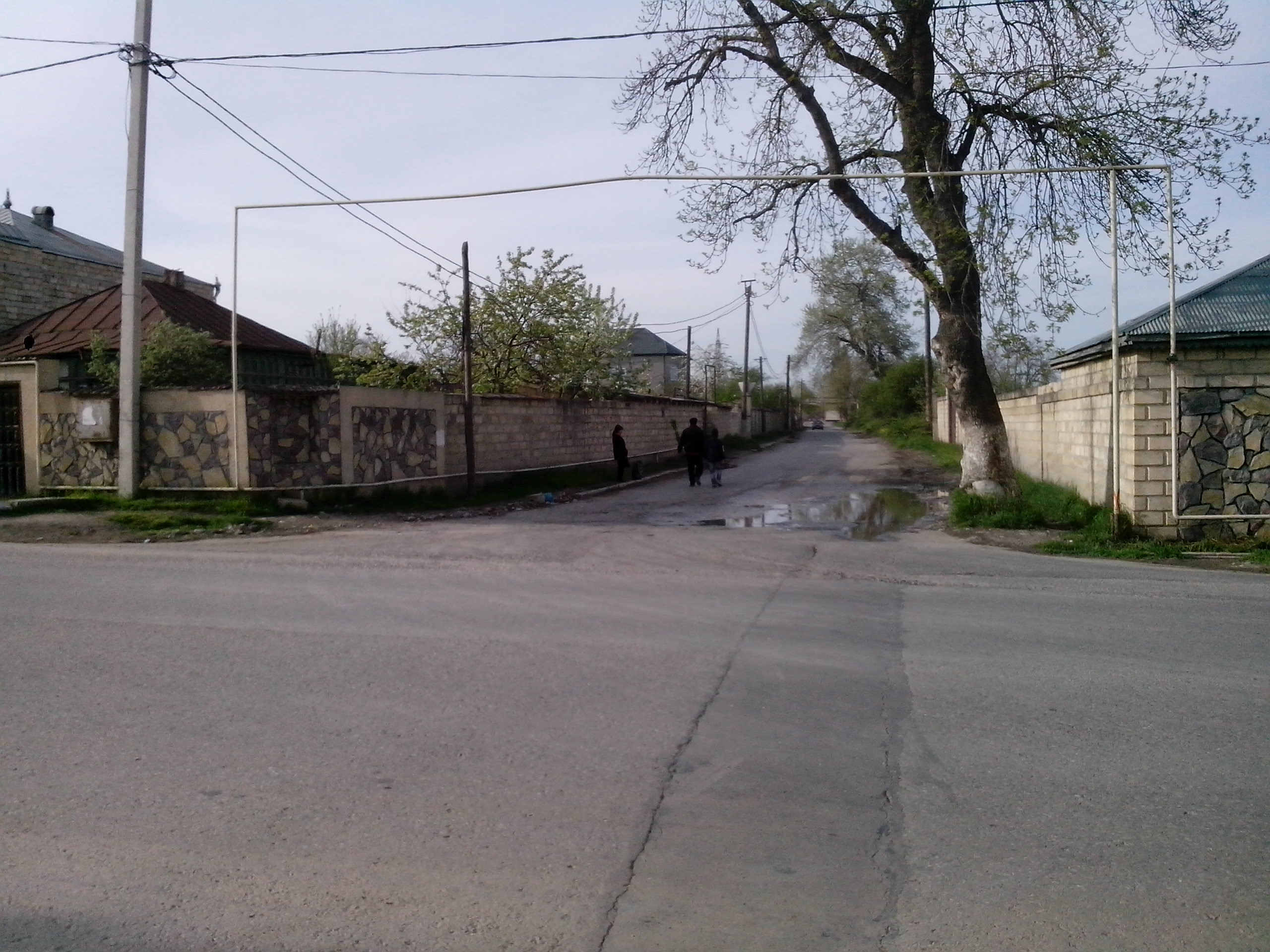

- Location within Azerbaijan
- Coordinates: 41°21′55″N 48°34′04″E
- Country: Azerbaijan
- Rayon: Quba

Population (2009)
  - Total: 2,834
- Time zone: UTC+4 (AZT)
  - Summer (DST): UTC+5 (AZT)

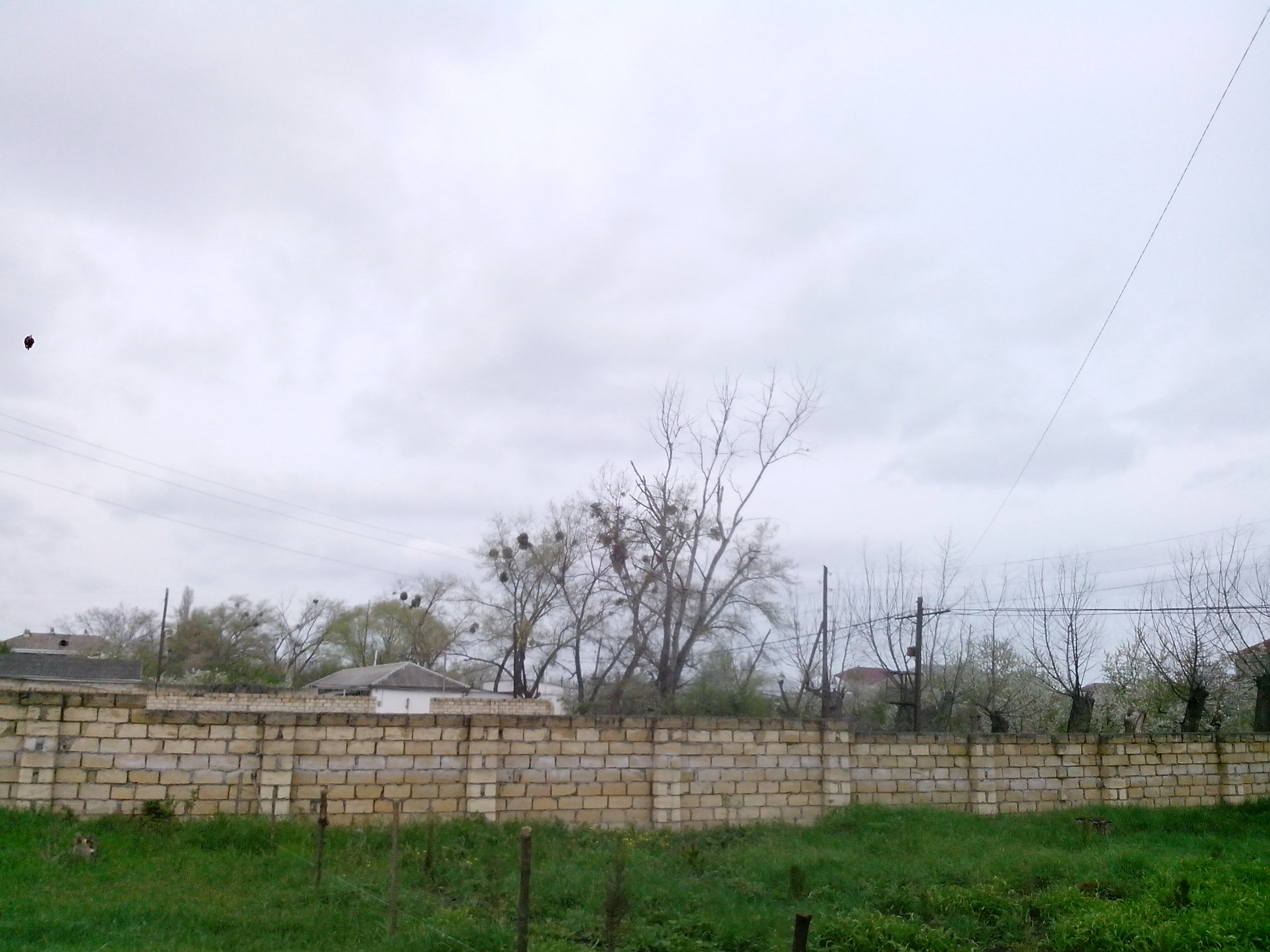

Alekseyevka is a village and municipality in the Quba Rayon of Azerbaijan. In the mid-twentieth century, the neighbouring village of Kozlyakovka was merged into Alekseyevka and now forms its southern end.
