= Həsənsu =

- Municipality
- Location within Azerbaijan
- Coordinates: 41°05′02″N 45°29′42″E
- Country: Azerbaijan
- Rayon: Agstafa

Population
  - Total: 2,841
- Time zone: UTC+4 (AZT)
  - Summer (DST): UTC+5 (AZT)

Həsənsu (also, Alekseyevka, Alekseyevo Selo, Kirovkənd, and Kirovka) is a village and municipality in the Agstafa Rayon of Azerbaijan. It has a population of 2,841.
