= Economy of Azerbaijan =

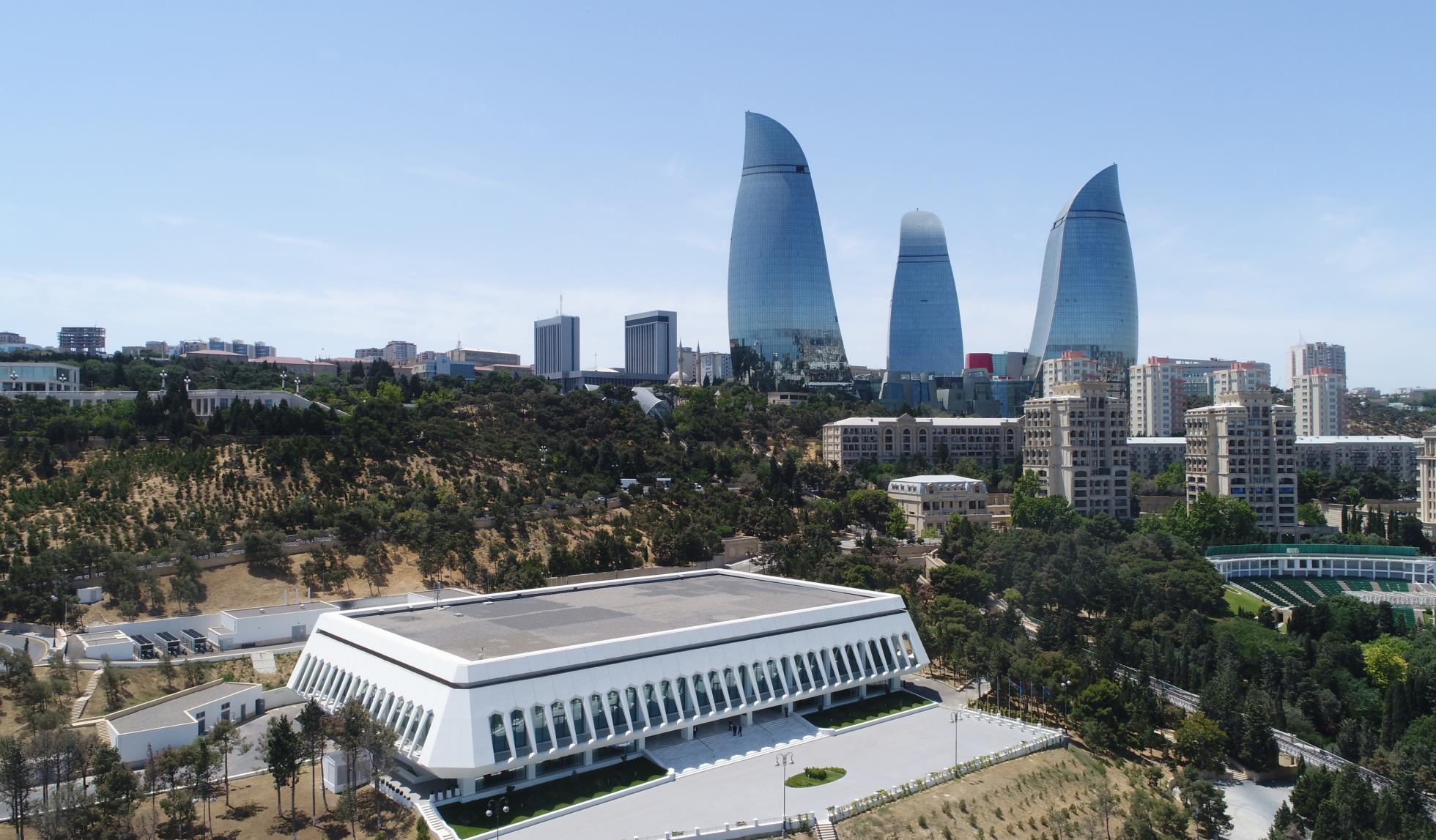
- Baku, the financial capital of Azerbaijan
- Currency: Azerbaijani manat (AZN, ₼)
- Fiscal year: Calendar year
- Trade organisations: CIS, ECO, GUAM, WTO (observer)
- Country group: Developing/Emerging; Upper-middle income economy

Statistics
- Population: ▲10,153,958 (2023)
- GDP: ▲$78.37 billion (nominal; 2026); ▲$281.3 billion (PPP; 2026)
- GDP rank: 87th (nominal; 2026.est); 74st (PPP; 2026.est)
- GDP growth: ▲1.4% (2025); ▲2.5% (2026f)
- GDP per capita: ▲$7,467 (nominal; 2026); ▲$26,800 (PPP; 2026)
- GDP per capita rank: 105th (nominal; 2025); 77th (PPP; 2025)
- GDP per capita growth: 1.0% (real; 2025)
- GDP by sector: agriculture: 6.93%; industry: 41.38%; services: 42.52%; (2020 est.)
- Inflation (CPI): ▲6.3% (May 2025)
- Population below national poverty line: 4.9% (2015 est.)
- Gini coefficient: 33.7 medium (2021)
- Human Development Index: ▲0.789 high (2025) (81st); ▲0.735 high IHDI (2025)
- Corruption Perceptions Index: 23 out of 100 points (2023, 154th rank)
- Labour force: ▲5,536,769 (2023); ▲62.0% employment rate (2022)
- Labour force by occupation: agriculture: 37%; industry: 14.3%; services: 48.9%; (2014)
- Unemployment: ▼5.4% (2024 est.); ▼13.6% youth unemployment (2022)
- Average gross salary: AZN 839 / €466 monthly (December, 2022)
- Average net salary: AZN 720 / €400 monthly (December, 2022)
- Main industries: petroleum and natural gas; petroleum products; oilfield equipment; steel; iron ore; cement; chemicals; petrochemicals; textiles; machinery; cotton; foodstuffs

External
- Exports: ▼$27.1 billion (2024)
- Export goods: oil and gas, machinery, foodstuffs, cotton
- Main export partners: EU 57.77%; Italy 31.9%; Greece 4.24%; Czechia 4.07%; Turkey 18.9%; EEU 5.13%; Russia 4.35%; India 2.71%; Israel 2.71%; Georgia 2.49%; United Kingdom 1.51% (2024)
- Imports: ▲$24.3 billion (2024)
- Import goods: machinery and equipment, foodstuffs, metals, chemicals
- Main import partners: EEU 19.45%; Russia 14.9%; Kazakhstan 2.65%; Belarus 1.88%; China 15.3%; EU 12.97%; Germany 3.21%; Italy 2.11%; Turkey 12%; United Kingdom 9.38%; United States 6.36%; Australia 6.02% (2024)
- FDI stock: ▲$79.53 billion (31 December 2017 est.); ▲ Abroad: $19.6 billion (31 December 2017 est.)
- Current account: ▲$4.65 billion (2024 est.)
- Gross external debt: ▲$15.51 billion (2024 est.)

Public finance
- Government debt: ▼20.5% of GDP (2024 est.)
- Foreign reserves: ▲$90,7 billion (2025 est.)
- Budget balance: 5.55% (of GDP) (2019 est.)
- Revenue: 17.175 billion (2022 est.)
- Spending: 19.002 billion (2022 est.)
- Credit rating: Fitch: BB+; Outlook: Negative; Moody's: Ba2; Outlook: Stable; Standard & Poor's: BB+; AAA (T&C Assessment); Outlook: Stable
- All values, unless otherwise stated, are in US dollars.

The economy of Azerbaijan is a developing upper-middle-income transition economy that is highly dependent on oil and gas exports, in particular since the completion of the Baku-Tbilisi-Ceyhan Pipeline. The transition to oil production in the late 1990s led to rapid economic growth over the period 1995–2014. Since 2014, GDP growth has slowed down substantially.

Large oil reserves are a major contributor to Azerbaijan's economy. Gas and oil make up two-thirds of Azerbaijan's GDP, making it one of the top ten most fossil fuel-dependent economies in the world. Gas and oil make up 90% of Azerbaijan's export revenues and 60% of its finances.

Azerbaijan's economy is characterized by corruption and inequality. The country's oil wealth has significantly strengthened the stability of Ilham Aliyev's regime and enriched ruling elites in Azerbaijan. The country's oil wealth has enabled the state to host lavish international events, as well as engage in extensive lobbying efforts abroad.

The national currency is the Azerbaijani manat. The private sector is weak in Azerbaijan, as the economy is dominated by state-owned enterprises. More than half of the formal labor force works for the government in Azerbaijan.

== Economic history of Azerbaijan ==
=== Republic era ===
Oil and gas are the most prominent products of Azerbaijan's economy. More than $60 billion was invested into Azerbaijan's oil sector by major international oil companies in AIOC consortium operated by BP. Oil production under the first of these production sharing agreements (PSAs), with the Azerbaijan International Operating Company, began in November 1997 and was about 500,000 barrels per day in 2006. People visit petroleum spas (or "oil spas") to bathe in the local crude in Naftalan. A leading caviar producer and exporter in the past, Azerbaijan's fishing industry today is concentrated on the dwindling stocks of sturgeon and beluga in the Caspian Sea.

Azerbaijan shares all the problems of the former Soviet republics in making the transition from a command to a market economy, but its energy resources brighten its long-term prospects. Azerbaijan has begun making progress on economic reform, and old economic ties and structures are slowly being replaced. An obstacle to economic progress, including foreign investment, is the continuing conflict with Armenia over the Nagorno-Karabakh region.

In 1992 Azerbaijan became a member of the Economic Cooperation Organization. In 2002, the Azerbaijani merchant marine had 54 ships.

In 2010 Azerbaijan entered into the top eight biggest oil suppliers to EU countries with €9.46 billion. In 2011, the amount of foreign investments in Azerbaijan was $20 billion, a 61% increase from 2010. According to Minister of Economic Development of Azerbaijan, Shahin Mustafayev, in 2011, "$15.7 billion was invested in the non-oil sector, while the rest – in the oil sector".

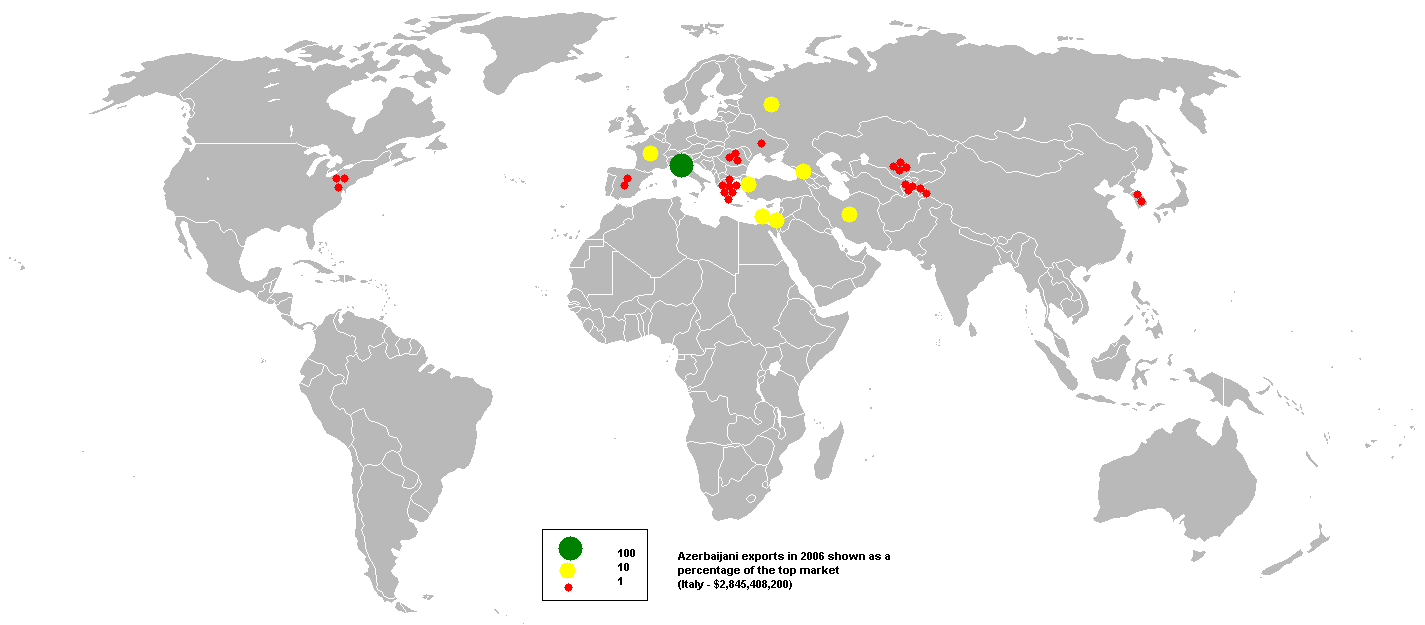
Azerbaijani exports in 2006

In 2012, because of its economic performance after the Soviet breakup, Azerbaijan was predicted to become "Tiger of Caucasus". In 2012, Globalization and World Cities Research Network study ranked Baku as a Gamma-level global city.

In 2015, Turkey and Azerbaijan agreed to boost mutual trade to US$15 billion by 2023.

== Macroeconomic trend ==
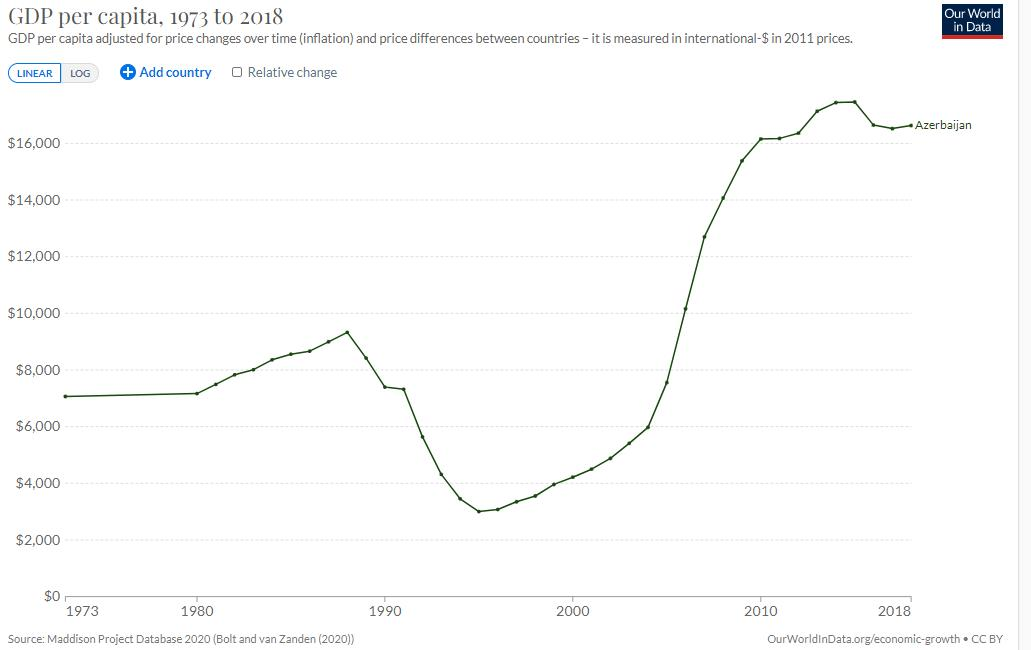
Change in per capita GDP of Azerbaijan since 1973. Figures are inflation-adjusted to 2011 International dollars.

The following is a chart of trend of gross domestic product of Azerbaijan at market prices with figures in USD.

Year	Gross domestic product PPP	Per capita income (as % of USA)
1995	19,497,000,000	8.78
2000	29,683,000,000	10.01
2005	59,087,000,000	15.52
2010	138,947,000,000	31.78
2015	169,789,000,000	32.15

For purchasing power parity comparisons, the US dollar was exchanged at 1,565.88 Manats only. Currently, the new Manat is in use, with an exchange rate of about 1 manat = $0.59. Mean graduate pay was $5.76 per man-hour in 2010.

The following table shows the main economic indicators in 1980–2017. Inflation below 5% is in green.

Year	GDP (in bn. US$ PPP)	GDP per capita (in US$ PPP)	GDP (in bn. US$ nominal)	GDP growth (real)	Inflation (in Percent)	Government debt (in % of GDP)
1993	21.7	2,895	1.3	▼−23.1%	▲1,129.7%	n/a
1995	▼15.8	▼2,066	▲2.4	▼−13.0%	▲411.8%	19%
2000	▲24.0	▲2,991	▲5.3	▲6.2%	▲1.8%	▼13%
2005	▲49.3	▲5,839	▲13.2	▲26.4%	▲9.6%	▼7%
2006	▲68.4	▲7,994	▲21.0	▲34.5%	▲8.3%	▼5%
2007	▲87.8	▲10,129	▲33.1	▲25.0%	▲16.7%	▼4%
2008	▲99.1	▲11,288	▲48.9	▲10.8%	▲20.8%	▼3%
2009	▲109.0	▲12,211	▼44.3	▲9.3%	▲1.5%	▲5%
2010	▲115.8	▲12,869	▲52.9	▲5.0%	▲5.7%	5%
2011	▲118.3	▲12,984	▲66.0	▲0.1%	▲7.9%	5%
2012	▲123.2	▲13,335	▲69.7	▲2.2%	▲1.1%	▲6%
2013	▲132.6	▲14,169	▲74.2	▲5.8%	▲2.4%	6%
2014	▲138.6	▲14,626	▲75.2	▲2.8%	▲1.4%	▲9%
2015	▲141.4	▲14,740	▼53.0	▲1.1%	▲4.0%	▲18%
2016	▼138.4	▼14,258	▼37.8	▼−3.1%	▲12.4%	▲21%
2017	▲141.1	▲14,380	▲41.4	▲0.2%	▲12.9%	▲23%
2018	▲151.9	▲15,347	▲47.1	▲1.5%	▲2.3%	▼19%
2019	▲167.2	▲16,798	▲48.2	▲2.5%	▲2.6%	▼18%
2020	▼153.0	▼15,345	▼42.7	▼−4.2%	▲2.8%	▲21%
2021	▲203.9	▲20,335	▲54.8	▲5.6%	▲6.7%	▲26%
2022	▲228.7	▲22,724	▲78.8	▲4.7%	▲13.9%	▼17%
2023	▲240.4	▲23,734	▼72.4	▲1.4%	▲8.8%	▲22%
2024	▲256.6	▲25,034	▲74.4	▲4.2%	▲2.2%	22%
2025	▲267.5	▲25,795	▲75.9	▲1.4%	▲5.6%	▼20%
2026	▲281.3	▲26,800	▲78.4	▲2.2%	▲6.0%	20%

For more than a century the backbone of the Azerbaijani economy has been petroleum, which represented 50 percent of Azerbaijan's GDP in 2005, and is projected to double to almost 125 percent of GDP in 2007. Now that Western oil companies are able to tap deep-water oilfields untouched by the Soviets because of poor technology, Azerbaijan is considered one of the most important areas in the world for oil exploration and development. Proven oil reserves in the Caspian Basin, which Azerbaijan shares with Russia, Kazakhstan, Iran, and Turkmenistan, are comparable in size to the North Sea, although exploration is still in the early stages.

== Sectors of the economy ==
=== Agriculture, livestock and forestry ===
Azerbaijan has the largest agricultural basin in the region. About 54.9 percent of Azerbaijan is agricultural lands. At the beginning of 2007 there were 4.76 million hectares (11.8 million acres) of utilized agricultural area. In the same year, the total wood resources counted 136 million cubic metres (178 million cubic yards). Azerbaijan's agricultural scientific research institutes are focused on meadows and pastures, horticulture and subtropical crops, leaf vegetables, viticulture and wine-making, cotton growing and medicinal plants. In some lands, it is profitable to grow grain, potatoes, sugar beets, cotton and tobacco. Livestock, dairy products, and wine and spirits are also important farm products. The Caspian fishing industry is concentrated on the dwindling stocks of sturgeon and beluga.

Some portions of most products that were previously imported from abroad have begun to be produced locally (among them are Coca-Cola by Coca-Cola Bottlers LTD, beer by Baki-Kastel, parquet by Nehir and oil pipes by EUPEC Pipe Coating Azerbaijan).

A new program which is prepared by the European Union is aimed to supporting the economic diversification of Azerbaijan.

=== Industrial ===
In 2007, mining and hydrocarbon industries accounted for well over 95 percent of the Azerbaijani economy. Diversification of the economy into manufacturing industries remains a long-term issue.

==== Defense ====
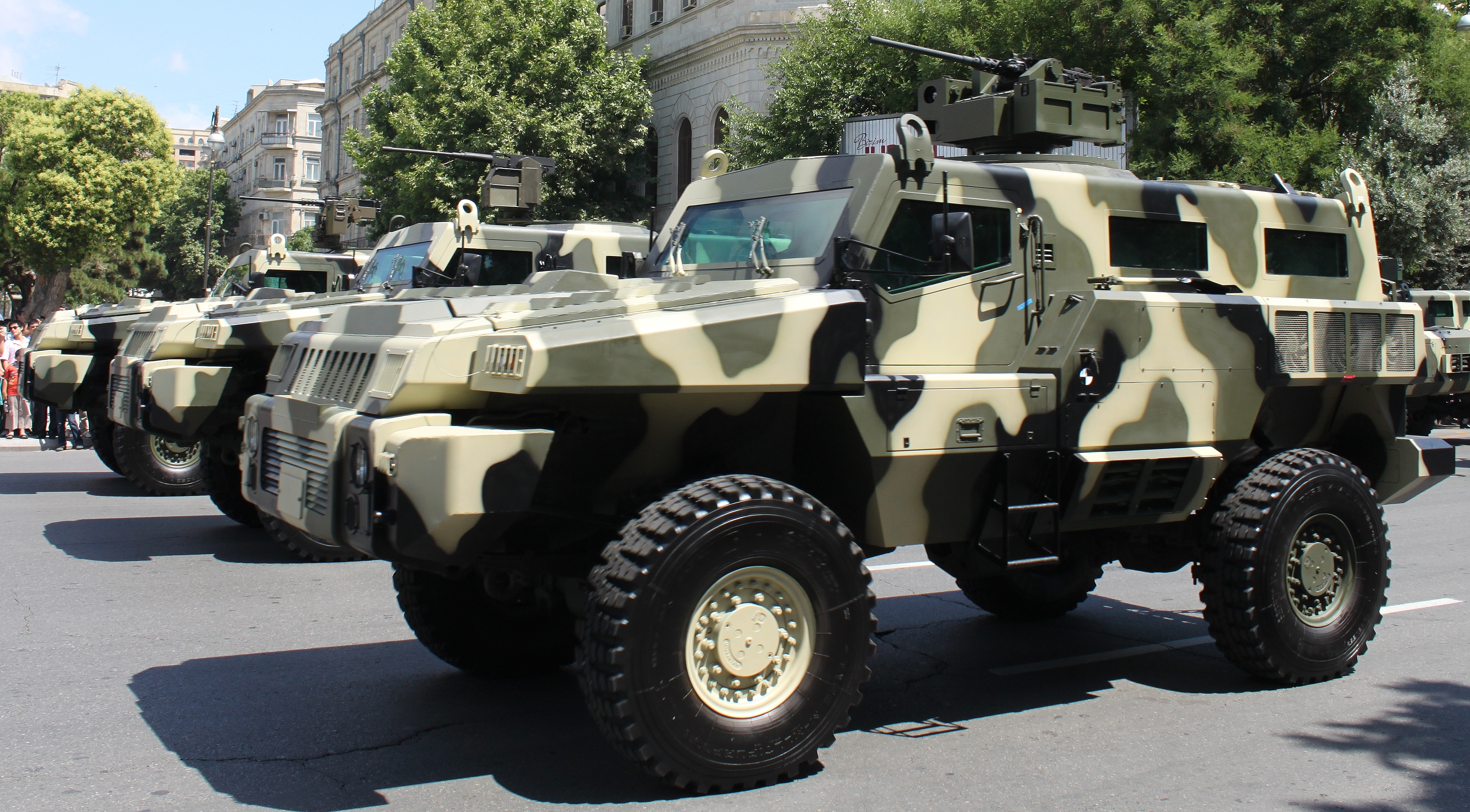
Marauder (Mine Protected Vehicle) is manufactured in Azerbaijan.

As of the late 2000s, the defense industry of Azerbaijan has emerged as an autonomous entity with a growing defense production capability. The Ministry of Defence Industry of Azerbaijan is cooperating with the defense sectors of Ukraine, Belarus and Pakistan. Along with other contracts, Azerbaijani defense industries and Turkish companies, Azerbaijan will produce 40 mm revolver grenade launchers, 107 mm and 122 mm MLRS systems, Cobra 4×4 vehicles and joint modernization of BTR vehicles in Baku.

==== Mining ====
The region of the Lesser Caucasus accounts for most of the country's gold, silver, iron, copper, titanium, chromium, manganese, cobalt, molybdenum, complex ores and antimony. The most prominent mines are Nehrəm mine and Sotk gold mine.

==== Oil and gas ====
The Baku-Tbilisi-Ceyhan pipeline (green) is one of several pipelines running from Baku.

Two-thirds of Azerbaijan is rich in oil and natural gas. In September 1994, a 30-year contract was signed between the State Oil Company of Azerbaijan Republic (SOCAR) and 13 oil companies, among them Amoco, BP, ExxonMobil, Lukoil and Statoil. As Western oil companies are able to tap deep-water oilfields untouched by the Soviet exploitation, Azerbaijan is considered one of the most important spots in the world for oil exploration and development. Azerigas, a sub-company of state-owned SOCAR, intends to ensure full gasification of the country by 2021.

=== Services ===
==== Financial and business services ====
Banking in Azerbaijan in its present form dates back to 1992, but it originated in the second half of the 19th century and continued through the Soviet period. It consists of the country's central bank, the Central Bank of Azerbaijan, founded on 11 February 1992, and other commercial banks. The commercial banks in the country are joint–stock companies.

The only valid currency in Azerbaijan is the Azerbaijani manat. Only the Central Bank can issue manats. During the transition to a market economy in the 1990s, the banking system was not meeting the needs of socioeconomic development as expected, and followed old, Soviet laws. Banks in Azerbaijan have mandatory reserves, determination of norms, regulations of liabilities between creditors and depositors, and deposit insurance. These laws were introduced in 1996 after the system proved to violate laws and timely repayments of deposits. The country's banking system is now stable.

==== Education ====
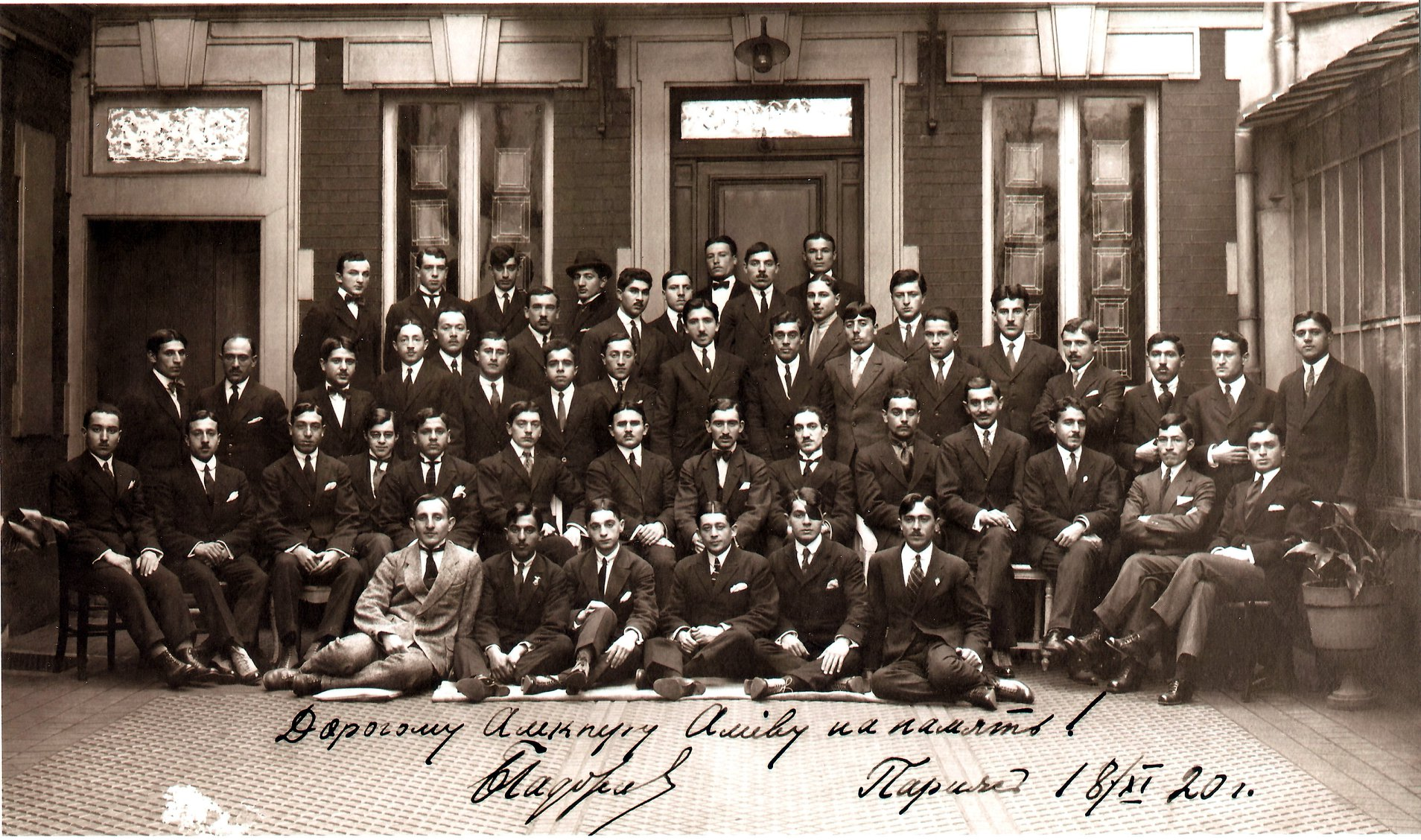
Azerbaijani students studying in Paris in 1920

Building of Baku Business University

Education in Azerbaijan is regulated by the Ministry of Science and Education of Azerbaijan.

The Human Rights Measurement Initiative (HRMI) finds that Azerbaijan is fulfilling only 85.6% of what it should be fulfilling for the right to education based on the country's level of income. HRMI breaks down the right to education by looking at the rights to both primary education and secondary education. While taking into consideration Azerbaijan's income level, the nation is achieving 81.0% of what should be possible based on its resources (income) for primary education and 90.3% for secondary education.

==== Healthcare ====
Healthcare in Azerbaijan is provided by public and private healthcare institutions and regulated through the Ministry of Healthcare.

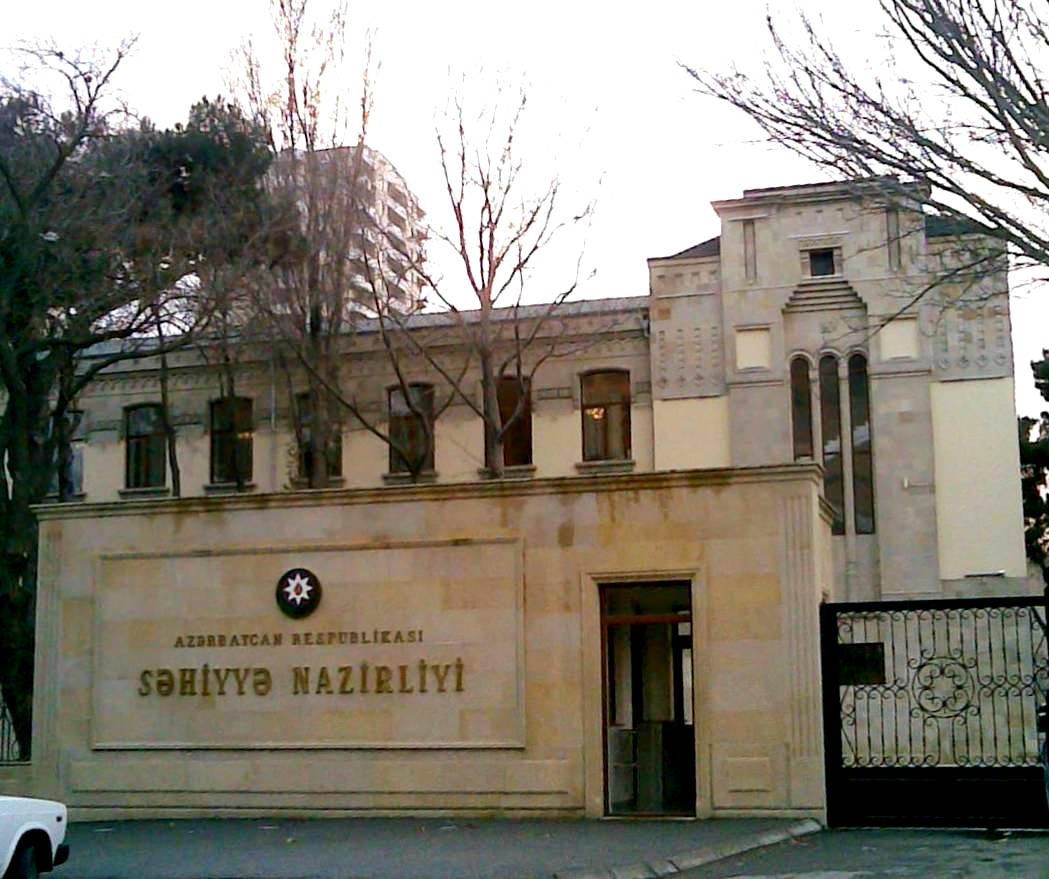
Ministry of Healthcare

==== Real estate ====
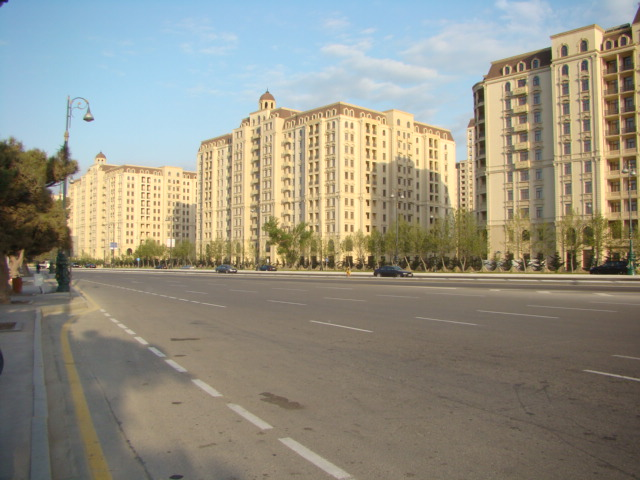
New residential buildings in Baku

Housing in Azerbaijan is characterized by high rates of private housing ownership. Construction in housing industry started to improve in the late 1990s, as the result of the Presidential decree (1997), which eliminated the state monopoly of the construction sector.

==== Telecommunications ====
The Azerbaijan telecommunications sector is embroiled in corruption. Azerbaijan President Ilham Aliyev and his family own two of Azerbaijan's largest mobile providers (Azerfon and Azercell) through offshore companies and potentially control three-quarters of the mobile market in Azerbaijan. The third large mobile provider is Bakcell, which is registered as a company in an offshore tax haven and whose owners are unknown. Ownership of the mobile providers in Azerbaijan enables the ruling Aliyev family to monitor phone calls and internet activity.

Investigative reporting revealed that Azerbaijani President Ilham Aliyev and his family made more than $1 billion when state shares of mobile operators were transferred to a purportedly "local partner" which was in reality owned by the Aliyev family's offshore companies.

Azerbaijan has relatively expensive call rates relative to comparable countries. The high prices are possibly due to consolidated control of the mobile market and a lack of competition.

The Azerbaijan government has stated that it wants to create a high-tech sector in Azerbaijan.

==== Tourism ====
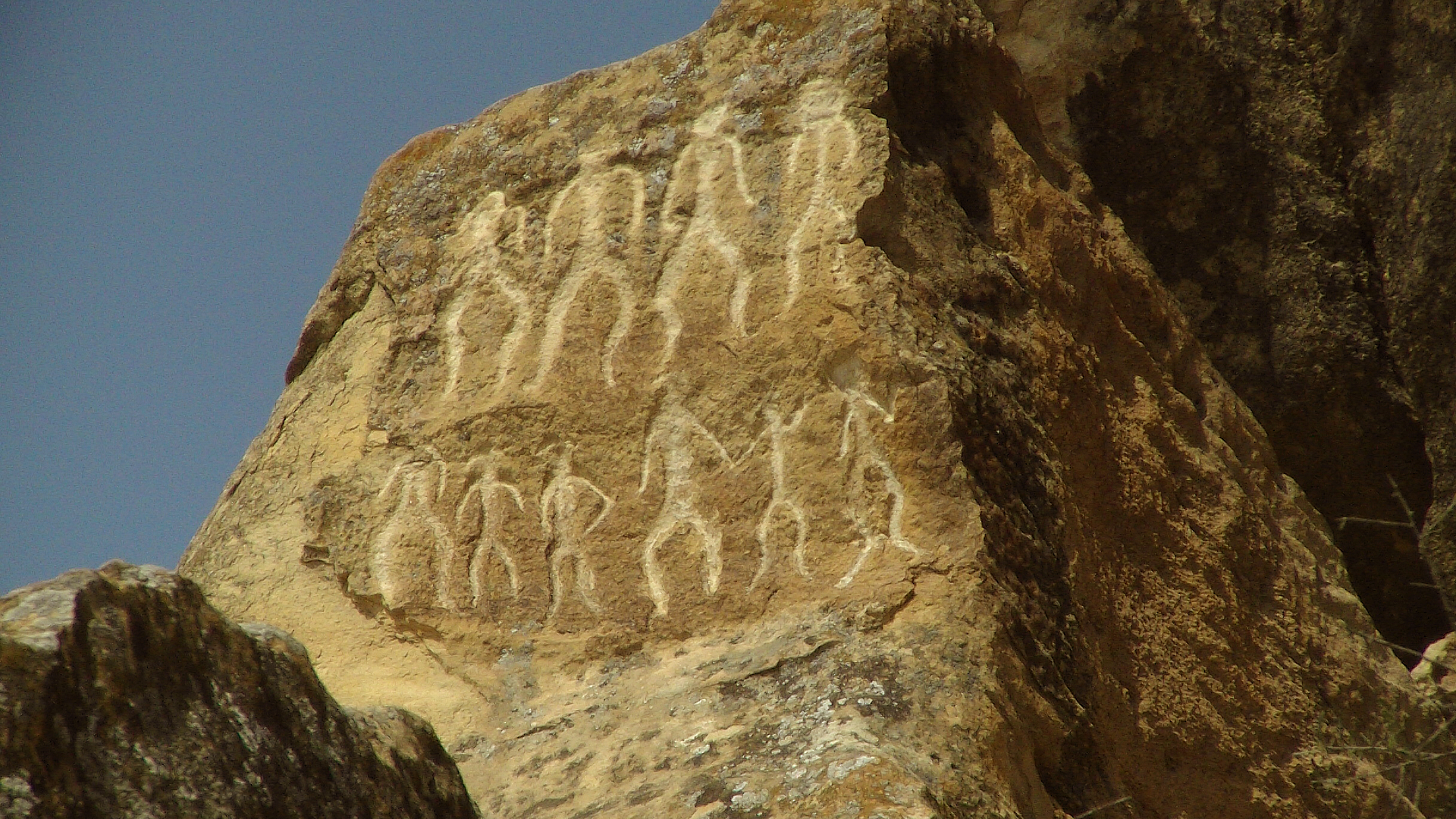
Petroglyphs in Gobustan dating back to 10,000 BC indicating a thriving culture. It is a UNESCO World Heritage Site considered to be of "outstanding universal value".

Tourism is an important part of the economy of Azerbaijan. The country was a well-known tourist spot in the 1980s. However, the fall of the Soviet Union, and the First Nagorno-Karabakh War during the 1988–1994 period, damaged the tourist industry and the image of Azerbaijan as a tourist destination.

It was not until the 2000s that the tourism industry began to recover, and the country has since experienced a high rate of growth in the number of tourist visits and overnight stays. In recent years, Azerbaijan has also become a popular destination for religious, spa, and health care tourism. During winter, the Shahdag Winter Complex offers skiing.

The government of Azerbaijan has set the development of Azerbaijan as an elite tourist destination a top priority. It is a national strategy to make tourism a major, if not the single largest, contributor to the Azerbaijani economy. These activities are regulated by the State Tourism Agency and the Ministry of Culture. The Formula One Grand Prix is held in Baku, the capital city, and has been held here for years.

== Infrastructure ==
=== Energy ===
Two-thirds of energy in Azerbaijan comes from fossil gas and almost a third from oil. Azerbaijan is a major producer of oil and gas, much of which is exported. Most electricity is generated by gas-fired power plants. Energy in the country is produced using all types of sources, including fuel, renewable energy, water energy, electrical and heat energy.

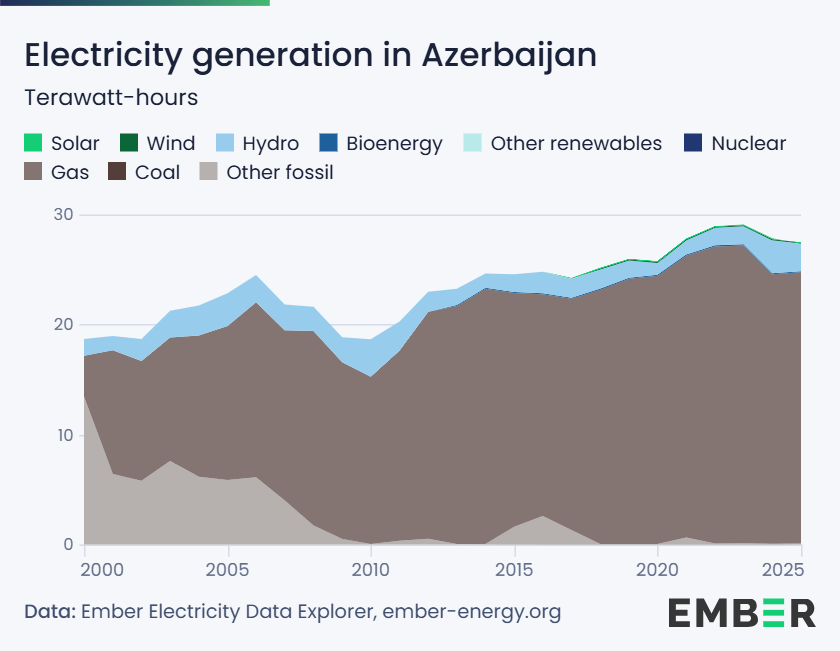
Electricity generation in Azerbaijan in terawatt-hours

- production: 24.32 billion kWh (2017)
- consumption: 17.09 billion kWh (2017)

Electrical power is the widely utilized energy source in Azerbaijan in terms of domestic and industrial use.Electricity production and its distribution are covered by the state-owned Azerenerji JSC and Azerishig JSC. The whole country's electricity demand is furnished by the power stations operating under Azerenerji. 13 of those stations are thermal power stations with the installed capacity of 5,400 MW power, and 17 are hydropower stations with the installed capacity of 1,162.2 MW power. Moreover, a number of small power stations have been set up by other companies in the country by utilizing water, wind, solar, and domestic waste.

Total installed capacity in September 2019 is 6.6455 million kW. Eight thermal plants supply 80% of capacity, including Shimal-2 power station put into used in early September 2019. 12% comes from 2 hydroelectric plants (Mingachevir HPP and Shamkir HPP), and the rest from other thermal, hydro and small hydro plants. The main power plants (both are thermal) are near Shirvan (Janub TPP – 780 MW) and Mingachevir (Azerbaijan TPP – 2,400 MW).

=== Transportation ===
The convenient location of Azerbaijan on the crossroad of major international traffic arteries, such as the Silk Road and the International North–South Transport Corridor, highlights the strategic importance of the transportation sector for the country's economy. The transport sector in the country includes roads, railways, aviation, and maritime transport.

Azerbaijan is also an important economic hub in the transportation of raw materials. The Baku-Tbilisi-Ceyhan pipeline (BTC) became operational in May 2006 and extends more than 1,774 kilometers through the territories of Azerbaijan, Georgia and Turkey. The BTC is designed to transport up to 50 million tons of crude oil annually and carries oil from the Caspian Sea oilfields to global markets.

The South Caucasus Pipeline, also stretching through the territory of Azerbaijan, Georgia and Turkey, became operational at the end of 2006 and offers additional gas supplies to the European market from the Shah Deniz gas field. Shah Deniz is expected to produce up to 296 billion cubic meters of natural gas per year. Azerbaijan also plays a major role in the EU-sponsored Silk Road Project.

In 2012, the construction of Kars–Tbilisi–Baku railway expected to provide transportation between Asia and Europe through connecting the railways of China and Kazakhstan in the east with Turkey's Marmaray to the European railway system in the west. Broad gauge railways in 2010 stretched for 2,918 km (1,813 mi) and electrified railways numbered 1,278 km (794 mi). By 2010, there were 35 airports and one heliport.

=== Water supply and sanitation ===
National Policy Dialogues on Integrated Water Resources Management in Azerbaijan for managing water resources are aimed at developing a state strategy based on "Convention on the Protection and Use of Transboundary Watercourses and International Lakes" of United Nations Economic Commission for Europe and European Union Water Framework Directive and the "Water and Health" Protocol of that convention as well as other principles of the United Nations and the EU.

Documents, directives and other acts of the EU, the United Nations Economic Commission for Europe, the United Nations Environment Programme, the Global Water Partnership, as well as other international organizations were used in the preparation of strategy. It was taken into account most international water legislation requirements.

== Currency system ==
The Azerbaijani manat is the currency of Azerbaijani, denominated as the manat, subdivided into 100 qapik. The manat is issued by the Central Bank of Azerbaijan, the monetary authority of Azerbaijan. The ISO 4217 abbreviation is AZN. The Latinised symbol is.

The manat is held in a floating exchange-rate system, managed primarily against the US dollar. The rate of exchange (Azerbaijani manat per US$1) for 28 January 2016, was AZN 1.60.

There is a complex relationship between Azerbaijan's balance of trade, inflation, measured by the consumer price index and the value of its currency. Despite allowing the value of the manat to "float", Azerbaijan's central bank has decisive ability to control its value in relationship to other currencies.

== Government policies and regulations ==
A single-window system was established by a decree of the Azerbaijani President issued in 2007, 30 April, in order to simplify export-import procedures, innovate customs services, and improve the trade environment. The president appointed the State Customs Committee as the leading body of controlling goods and transportation passing through the borders of the country in 2008.

Single window system shares needed information through a single gateway with all organizations serving in trade field, as well as abolishes useless processes and raises the effectiveness of cooperation among different parties. 73 economies implement single window system in the world. Azerbaijan started to implement this system in 2009. It implemented an E-Government portal as well.

The State Migration Service issues appropriate permits for foreigners and stateless persons coming to Azerbaijan to live and work. The "single window" principle has been applied on migration management processes starting from 1 July 2009 according to the Decree.

== Poverty ==
As per the Asian Development Bank's estimates of 2017, 5.5% of the population of Azerbaijan lives below the poverty line in 2022. Experts estimate that the real figure is much higher. The 2017 Asian Development Bank report also estimated that for every 1000 babies born in Azerbaijan, 18 die before their 15th birthday.

While the government of Azerbaijan has become immensely wealthy over the past two decades due to an oil boom, it is unclear to what extent this has affected living standards, with poverty, corruption, and repression continuing to affect the country. Rovshan Aghayev, one of Azerbaijan's leading economists, states that the Azerbaijani government's claim of drastically reducing poverty is unsubstantiated, as the state fails to provide the transparent statistical data necessary to measure real income inequality and living standards.

Khadjia Ismayilova, an Azerbaijani investigative journalist and member of the Organized Crime and Corruption Reporting Project, states that "Azerbaijanis understand quite well that the wealth of oligarchs we expose has been built at the expense of their empty fridges and the time will come when the anger of poverty will explode." The revenue from the petroleum resources of Azerbaijan benefits the capital of Baku, while the rest of the country remains underdeveloped.

== Foreign trade and investment ==
According to the statement of the US Department of State on the Azerbaijan investment climate, published in May 2015, under Azerbaijani law, foreign investors may engage in investment activities not prohibited by law. Private entities are allowed to establish, acquire and dispose of interests freely in business enterprises. Foreign citizens, organizations, and enterprises may lease, but may not own land.

Given to the report, the country has worked to integrate more fully into the global economic marketplace, attract increased foreign investment, diversify its economy and maintain positive growth. The country proceeds to follow the strategy of attracting foreign direct investment to support economic diversification.

The late government of Azerbaijan approved the Law on Protection of Foreign Investments in 1992, which was recently replaced by the Law on Investment activity, on which full legal protection was provided for international investors. The law also ensures equal treatment towards both foreign and local investors and enables the repatriation of profits, revenues and other investment-related funds as long as applicable taxes have been paid. The Law on the Protection of Foreign Investments protects foreign investors against nationalization and requisition, excluding certain specified circumstances. The nationalization of property can occur when authorized by parliamentary resolution, although cases of official nationalization or requisition against foreign companies have not been recorded in Azerbaijan.

An exemption from income, land, and property taxes for business parks, for example in the sector of information technology, in Azerbaijan has been created at the new amendments made to the Tax Code in 2013. These amendments also provide tax and customs privileges for the residents of industrial and technological parks for a term of seven years.

The ability of foreign companies to take part in subsidized research and development programs financed or subsidized by the government in Azerbaijan is not restricted.

Azerbaijan also joined to the Convention Establishing the World Intellectual Property Organization which sets norms and standards for the protection and enforcement of intellectual property rights, the Paris Convention for Protection of Industrial Property, and the Berne Convention for the Protection of Literary and Artistic Works. Azerbaijan is a party to the Geneva Phonograms Convention, and acceded to the two WIPO Internet treaties in 2005.

The country also ranked 33 among 144 countries in the World Economic Forum Global Competitiveness Index on 2014-2015 mainly regarding to maintenance of a stable macroeconomic policy environment over the last ten years, and places at 9 out of 144 countries for macroeconomic environment.

Azerbaijan develops its market infrastructure, including legal, tax and banking systems and relations with the international business community. It enables the businesses entering Azerbaijan to calculate the risks and make decisions. The following entities and individuals can be foreign investors in Azerbaijan:

- Foreign legal persons;
- Foreign citizens, stateless persons, and citizens of Azerbaijan with a permanent residence abroad subject to registration in their country of residence for engaging in economic activity;
- Foreign countries;
- International organizations;

== Other economic indicators ==
Exports of Azerbaijan by product category (2019) Chemical products Transportation Machines Mineral products Plastics and rubbers Metals Foodstuffs Precious metals Textiles Instruments Animal products Vegetable products Paper goods Footwear and headwear Miscellaneous Stone and glass Wood products Animal and vegetable bi-products Animal hides Arts and antiques Weapons

Data from CIA World Factbook unless noted otherwise

Investment (gross fixed)

17% of GDP (2011 est.)

Household income or consumption by percentage share

- lowest 10%: 3.4%
- highest 10%: 27.4% (2008)

Inflation rate (consumer prices)

1.1% (2012 est.)

Agriculture

- utilized agricultural land: 47,584 square kilometres (18,372 sq mi) (2011)
- total wood resources: 144,2 million cubic meters
- crops: cotton, rice and other grains, grapes, fruit, vegetables, tea, tobacco
- livestock products: beef, mutton, poultry, milk, eggs

Industrial production growth rate

-3% (2011 est.)

Electricity

- production: 22,55 billion kWh (2008)
- consumption: 18,8 billion kWh (2008)
- exports: 812 million kWh (2008)
- imports: 596 million kWh (2008)

Current account balance

- $11,12 billion (2011 est.)

Exports – commodities

- petroleum and natural gas, petroleum products, oilfield equipment; steel, iron ore, cement; chemicals, petrochemicals, textiles, machinery, cotton, foodstuffs.

Reserves of foreign exchange and gold

- $7,146 billion (2011 est.)

Debt – external

- $3.89 billion (2011 est.)

Currency

- 1 Manat = 100 gepik

Exchange rates

- Azerbaijani manat per US dollar – 1.7 (for 22 November 2020)
- Azerbaijani manat per Euro – 2.01 (for 22 November 2020)

Fiscal year

- Calendar year

== See also ==
- List of companies of Azerbaijan
- Azerbaijan and the International Monetary Fund
- Corruption in Azerbaijan
- Economy of Baku
- Economy of Guba
- Financial Market Supervisory Authority of Azerbaijan
- Ministry of Economy (Azerbaijan)
- Ministry of Finance (Azerbaijan)
- Ministry of Taxes (Azerbaijan)
- Privatization in Azerbaijan
- Science and technology in Azerbaijan
- Small and medium enterprises in Azerbaijan
- State Oil Fund of Azerbaijan
- Utilities in Azerbaijan
