= Silk industry in Azerbaijan =

The silk industry in Azerbaijan has existed since ancient times. Shirvan was the largest silk farming region there. The population in Shamakhi, Basqal, Ganja, Shaki and Shusha engaged in silk production. Patterned, ornamental silk female kerchiefs were produced in these regions. Silk production was one of the main activities continued into modern times.

== Shirvan ==
The silk produced in Shirvan was known in countries such as Russia and Western Europe by the 11th century. At that time, silk was exported to Russia, Iraq, Syria and other countries from Shamakhi. Shirvan maintained its dominance in silk production in the Near East in the 16th and 17th centuries. Most Shirvan silk is exported. Most of the rest was used for silk weaving. Adam Olearius visited Azerbaijan in the 17th century and wrote that 10-20 thousand packs (each pack was approximately 5.5 pounds) of raw materials were collected per year. 3000 packs belonged to Shirvan, 2000 belonged to Garabagh. It means 16.5 thousand pounds of raw material were produced in Shirvan, but 11 thousand pounds in Garabagh.

== Shaki ==
Archeological investigations carried out in Shaki proved that silk production was the primary ancient household activity there. Development of silk production connected this city to the silk road caravan routes.

A silk plant began to operate in 1931 in Shaki, which became one of the silk industry enterprises in the former USSR.

In the 1970-1980s, 5-6 thousand tons of wet cocoon and 350-400 tons of raw silk was produced, supplying silk textile in 10 of million square meters. More than 150 thousand families were engaged in feeding and cocoon production. At that time, more than 14,000 people worked in the silk industry. 7,000 more were permanent employees of “Shaki-Silk” plant. Azerbaijan was in the second place for cocoon production in the former Soviet Union after Uzbekistan, but was first for the quality of the produced silk. The “Shaki-Silk” plant used to send textiles to 75 enterprises in the USSR, as well as silk thread to 84 enterprises. Textiles made from Shaki silk were exported to Japan, Switzerland, Italy and other countries.

At the beginning of the 1990s, a recession was observed hit the silk industry. As a result, economic relations established over many years were lost. During these years, 2 silk producing stations, 7 cocoon seed plants, nearly 30 cocoon drying rooms, about 80 points for cocoon primary processing, as well as company “Shaki-Silk”, Ordubad spinning mill stopped production. 10s of thousands of people lost work. The 1500 year-old Azerbaijan silking industry was in danger of destruction.

“Parvana” LLC was the winner of an investment competition for "Shaki-Silk”. It organized a development program to expand production and develop silkworm breeding. Production workshops were reconstructed, new technologies were applied to production, additional facilities and tools were installed.

To improve the quality of the product, reconstruction was carried out in 2008. 4 spinning mills produced in China, 4 silk winders, new tools and vacuum apparatus were installed. After reconstruction labour productivity increased 6-7 times and production power 2.5 times. In the same year, new production area – cotton spinning workshop with the 1740 tons of power launched its production. As a result of the activities, the number of employees in the company increased to 1500.

== Kelaghayi ==
The most popular silk product in Azerbaijan is the women's silk scarf, called Kelaghayi. Kelaghayi is mainly produced in Sheki and Basqal. In 2014, Kelaghayi was included in the UNESCO Intangible Cultural Heritage List in Azerbaijan.

== See also ==
- Agriculture in Azerbaijan
- Economy of Azerbaijan
