= Agrarian reforms in Azerbaijan =

Agrarian reforms or land reforms of Azerbaijan is a set of laws designed and adopted by State Commission on Agrarian Reforms since 1995.

Reforms were initiated and implemented to create new ones and modify existing forms of property and give impetus to economic activity. The main objectives of the reforms were to establish property rights on land, create and further develop market economy, provide the country's citizens with local agricultural products and generally, increase standards of living and welfare.

== Background ==
Azerbaijan became an independent state in 1991, and during the early years of independence, the main drivers of the government, such as political, social, economic and public sectors were struggling. This happened because the country was hit by several problems, such as unstable political situation, military aggression against Azerbaijan and occupation of its territories, internal movement of refugees and consequently, increased unemployment, huge government spending on national defense due to the war in Nagorno-Karabakh area. The breakup of ties between Azerbaijan and foreign markets due to the collapse of the Soviet Union and the rise in prices over 17 times. These processes eventually resulted in the civil war and sharp slowdown in each sector of the country.

As Azerbaijan had lost its connections in the world market, as did all other Soviet states. One of the most important aspects for improvement was the establishment and implementation of new land policies and reforms. The main impetus for land reforms was that the population had to be supplied by the agricultural foods and products, and the cheapest way of doing that was developing the local production.

In order to establish the process of economic breakthrough, the special State Commission on Agrarian Reforms was created by decree of the president of the Azerbaijan Republic No. 313 in March 1995, prior to the reforms. Another special commission was created in December 1994. One of the main responsibilities of the State Commission on Agrarian Reforms (SCAR) was to design and elaborate the agrarian reform program. This was done through examination of countries experiencing the transition to market economy and carrying out experiments in different sectors of the country. Other responsibilities of SCAR included examination and verification of territorial land reform programmes, providing instructions on how to implement those reforms and informing the population about the progress of the land reform.

== Reforms ==
The first period of agricultural reforms covered the years between 1995 and 2003. Till 2003, more than 50 decree and standard acts were issued by the government and the President of Azerbaijan Republic. These laws included the following:

– Law of the Republic of Azerbaijan “On land reforms” of July 16, 1996;

– Law of the Republic of Azerbaijan "On the land tax" December 24, 1996;

– The decree of the President of the Republic of Azerbaijan "On application of the Law of the Azerbaijan Republic "On the land reform", № 534" January 10, 1997;

– Law of the Republic of Azerbaijan "On state land cadastre, land monitoring and structure" of December 22, 1998;

– Law of the Republic of Azerbaijan "On land rent" of March 12, 1999;

– Law of the Republic of Azerbaijan "On land market" May 7, 1999;

– Law of the Republic of Azerbaijan "On the land's fertility" December 30, 1999;

– Land Code of the Republic of Azerbaijan approved by Law of the Republic of Azerbaijan of June 25, 1999.

=== On the land reform ===
This law was signed on July 16, 1996 and created a foundation for preceding reforms. As stated in the official document, the purpose of the reform is:

... creation of the new relations of land ownership on the basis of the principles of economic independence and social equality, development of market economy and entrepreneurial initiative, achievement of economic independence of the country, including providing the population with food, and increase as a result of this material wealth of the Azerbaijani people.

The procedures of the "On the land" reformed were carried out by the State Commission on Agrarian Reforms (SCAR) with its representative in each region, the Regions Commission on Agrarian Reforms (RCAR). The RARC comprised the Head of the Executive Power of the according region, the officers from State Land Committee, and independent specialists.

The land reform specified the allocation of land into state, municipal and private ownership. The first stage included the free-of-charge allocation of part of the land fund of collective and state farms to citizens according to legal documentation. The main responsibility of the government institutions were to provide the population with the necessary documents for owning the land and to create a list of requirements for obtaining the land. It also outlines the procedures of privatization of lands and the rights of landowners.

=== On the land tax ===
The Law of the Republic of Azerbaijan "On the land tax" determines the rules of calculation, payments, objects and period of the land tax. The lands that are allocated to persons according to the legislation are considered as object for taxation. However, there exist several exemptions for this type of tax – the lands for common use (regardless of who is the owner – an individual or state), the lands which are under the state protection and reserves, the recreational lands, the lands used for the cultural-historical purpose, natural funds (water, wood) engaged in industrial activity and lands that are unusable or of little use, transferred to individuals for agricultural purposes – are exempted from taxation.

The tax is withheld in the form of lump sum, meaning that regardless of the amount of the economic activity the taxpayers will only pay a fixed amount of tax each year.

=== On state land cadastre, land monitoring and structure ===
This law was signed on December 22, 1998 and it regulates the conduct of state land cadaster, controls the use of land on the territory of the Republic of Azerbaijan. This cadaster is a collection of data considering the registration of land tenure, the quantity and quality of land and their economic estimation. The control of organizational works on lands is crucial, because by this way the government monitors the condition of lands, namely levels of fertility and pollution. By controlling and taking actions in a timely manner, the government can prevent and eliminate the negative consequences of irrational use of land.

This law identifies the unified system of documentation for the state land cadastre. This includes the rights of landowners, the certificates on transfer, etc.

=== On land rent ===
This reform determines the procedures of renting the land, the required documentations and conditions for the transfer. It also identifies the possible types of transferring the land for the temporary use – short-term and long-term use. The taxes on land, the procedures of payment, the object of taxation and taxpayers are specified in this law.

=== On the land market ===
This law reflects the issues about the land-market relations, the objectives and tasks of the legislation on the land market, the rules and laws concerning the land market, the resolution of disputes, the procedures following the infringement of the legislation, etc. This law specifies natural and legal persons as participants of the land market, and states that they can act in form of tenants, depositors, as well as users of the land. The issues concerning foreigners, international organizations and legal persons have found their reflection in this Law.

== See also ==
- Agriculture in Azerbaijan
- Economy of Azerbaijan
- Heydar Aliyev
