= Agriculture in Azerbaijan =

Soviet Azerbaijan was largely an agrarian country, with the share of agriculture in GDP fluctuating around 30% through the 1980s. After the demise of the USSR in 1991, Azerbaijan's economy underwent rapid “petrolification” with the share of the oil sector rising from 16% of GDP in 1995 to 64% in 2023. The share of agriculture simultaneously decreased from 25% in 1995 to less than 6% in 2023. Today, Azerbaijan is classified by international institutions as an upper-middle-income economy rich in hydrocarbon resources.

Azerbaijan's agricultural land endowment in 2023 was about 4.8 million hectares, constituting 55% of its territory. This put Azerbaijan among the top 15 countries in the world richest in agricultural land.

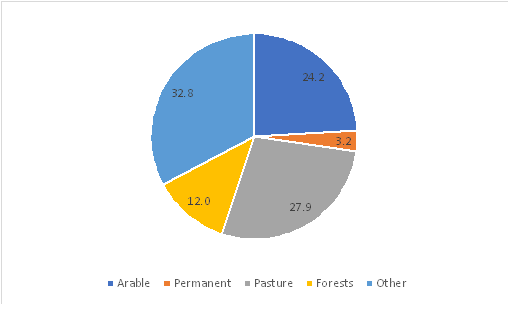
Azerbaijan: Structure of land (2023)

Agricultural land was evenly split between meadows and pastures supporting livestock (2.4 million hectares) and arable land supporting crop production (2.1 million hectares; the balance was permanent orchards). Forests occupied 12% of Azerbaijan's territory, representing 1 million hectares, according to the annual agricultural report by the State Statistics Committee in 2023. A steady 30% of the agricultural land has remained under irrigation since 1990.

== Agricultural production ==
Azerbaijan's agricultural production was crop-biased in the Soviet period. However, the share of crops in Azerbaijan's Gross Agricultural Output (GAO) has steadily decreased since independence from over 60% in 1990 to slightly less than 50% in 2023. The production structure is now evenly balanced between crops and livestock.

The primary crops produced in Azerbaijan are cereals (mainly wheat and barley), horticultural crops (potatoes, vegetables, melons), and certain fruits (primarily pomes and subtropical varieties - persimmon and pomegranate, but also stone fruits - peaches and apricots). Citrus fruits (represented mainly by mandarin oranges) and nuts (mainly hazelnuts) have never played a prominent role in Azerbaijan's crop production. Cotton, tobacco, and tea - the three traditional industrial crops in Soviet Azerbaijan—have been marginalized. Tea and tobacco virtually disappeared from Azerbaijan's product mix: tea dropped from a peak of 13,000 hectares producing 35,000 tons in 1988 to just 1,000 hectares producing 1,000 tons in 2023; tobacco dropped from 16,000 hectares producing 60,000 tons in 1985 to less than 3,000 hectares producing 6,000 tons in 2023. Neither of these crops makes a measurable contribution to the value of Azerbaijan's agricultural production in 2023.

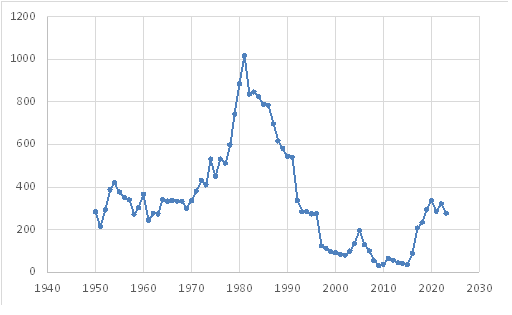
Azerbaijan cotton production 1950-2023 (thou. tons)

With government encouragement, cotton production increased steadily from 300,000 tons in the early 1950s to a peak of 1 million tons in 1981. It dropped precipitously to a mere 35,000 tons in 2015, rebounding to 300,000 tons in 2022–2023. Areas sown to cotton followed a similar pattern, peaking at 300,000 hectares in 1982, declining to a low of less than 20,000 hectares in 2015, and rebounding to 100,000 hectares in 2019–2023. The recovery of cotton production may be due in part to the approval, in July 2017, of the State Program for the development of cotton-growing in Azerbaijan in 2017–2022.

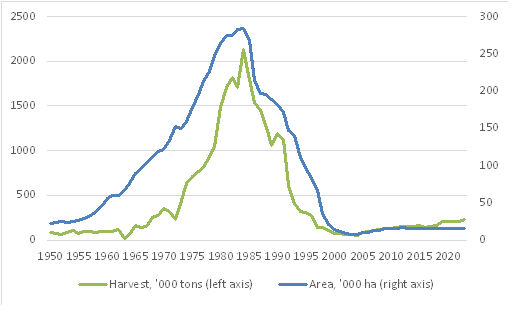
Grape production and vineyard area 1950-2023

During the first six decades of the Soviet regime, until 1984, Azerbaijan was one of the main republics in viticulture and winemaking. The area of vineyards increased rapidly from 22,500 hectares in 1950 to nearly 300,000 hectares in 1983–1984, with the gross harvest of grapes growing from 80,000 tons in 1950 to more than 2 million tons in 1984. By quantities of wine, cognac, and champagne produced from its grapes, Azerbaijan ranked fourth in the USSR after Russia, Ukraine, and Moldova. Viticulture collapsed following President Gorbachev's anti-alcohol campaign launched in 1985. Vineyards were uprooted, wineries were closed, grape harvests dropped from 2 million tons in 1984 to 1 million tons in 1991, bottoming out at 50,000 tons in 2004. A relative recovery was observed after that year, with grape harvests rebounding to 200,000 tons by 2023. The recovery was triggered by the adoption, in 2001, of the law “On viticulture and winemaking” and the approval by the President, in December 2011, of the State Program “On the development of viticulture in Azerbaijan in 2012-2020".

Cereals rank second by importance among Azerbaijan's crops today. With a production of 3 million tons and a sown area of 1 million hectare (averages for 2010–2023), cereals contributed 12% of GAO during 2015–2023. The first place belongs to the composite category of horticultural crops, which include potatoes, vegetables, and melons. Combined with orchard fruits, these crops contributed fully 30% of Azerbaijan's GAO for 2015–2023.

Livestock production accounted for 52% of gross agricultural output in 2015–2023 with meat and milk as the main products. Meat (cattle and poultry) contributed 32% of GAO in that period, and milk added another 16%. Eggs, wool, and other livestock products made up the remaining 4% of output.

The growth of Azerbaijan's agricultural output shows three distinct phases (see graph). The first phase is the Soviet growth period that lasted from 1965 to 1985, during which the output tripled.

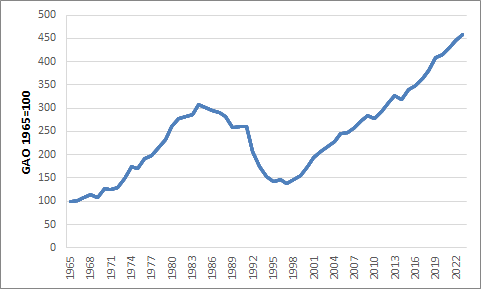
Azerbaijan GAO 1965-2023

Then came the collapse phase that was triggered, still during the USSR era, by internal clashes with the Armenian minority and the war with Armenia in Nagorno-Karabakh, events that severely disrupted Azerbaijan's economy. Agriculture was hit particularly hard because the districts occupied by Armenia in 1992-1993 were home to nearly 15% of Azerbaijan's agricultural land resources. The conflict-induced blockade of the Nakhichevan Autonomous Republic also negatively affected agriculture in that region. The collapse was arrested in 1997 after the cease-fire with Armenia had been signed (in 1994) and President Aliyev's 1995 farm-structure reforms began to have the expected beneficial effects. During the collapse phase 1985–1997, the agricultural output contracted by more than 50%. After 1997 came the steady, almost linear, growth fueled by President Aliyev's agrarian reforms and the overall improvement of the economic climate as a result of the 2020 ceasefire agreement with Armenia and the oil exploration contracts signed with Western companies. Between 1997 and 2023, the agricultural output more than tripled, rising at a geometric average rate of almost 5% annually. The three-phase development of Azerbaijan's agriculture - growth, collapse, recovery - is closely replicated by the pattern of the country's GDP growth.

== Changes in farming structure ==
Azerbaijan entered independence in 1991 with the traditional Soviet farm structure characterized by state ownership of all agricultural land and by extreme duality: some 3,000 large “socialized” or corporate farm enterprises (collective and state farms) controlled more than 95% of agricultural land while 800,000 rural households with individual plots farmed less than 5% of land. The average agricultural enterprise in the early 1990s had 1,500 hectares of agricultural land compared with merely 0.17 hectares for a household plot.

Such duality of farm structure, anchored to state ownership of all agricultural land, was a hallmark of the Soviet economic system. In the early 1990s, it became clear that Azerbaijan's agricultural sector required substantial restructuring if it was to realize its potential. Prices for agricultural products did not rise as fast as the cost of inputs; the Soviet-era collective farm system was inefficient and discouraged private initiative; equipment in general and the critically important irrigation system, in particular, were outdated; modern technology had not been introduced widely; and the administration of agricultural programs was ineffective. International institutions and Western economists urged the Government of Azerbaijan to embark on a process of land reform, including land privatization and farm restructuring, with the ultimate objective of bringing Azerbaijan's agriculture in line with the practice of market economies and improving its efficiency through better utilization of the country's agricultural potential. Responding to international expert advice, Heydar Aliyev, the President of Azerbaijan, established in March 1995 a special State Commission on Agrarian Reforms (SCAR) with the responsibility to study the international experience with land-related issues and solicit the recommendations of foreign experts.

The first indications of the seriousness of the intentions to embark on land reform came in 1991, years before the establishment of SCAR. The first Land Code of Independent Azerbaijan, passed in November 1991, contained a landmark provision that recognized private ownership and transferability of land. Soon after that, in April 1992, came the Law on Peasant Farms that, for the first time in decades, established a new legal form of farming organization based on family labor and falling between large farm enterprises (collective and state farms) and household plots. In the process of reforms, land was sweepingly privatized and became fully transferable.

The socialized farm enterprises (collective and state farms) were disbanded between 1990 and 1998. Some of them reorganized as private farming corporations, but most land from the former collective and state farms was distributed to farm members and rural residents essentially free of charge. In total, more than 1.3 million hectares of land had been privatized as of 2001 to approximately 817,700 families. In addition, over 620,000 household farms increased their plots to 2.8 hectares on average (up from 0.17 hectares in the Soviet era). As of January 2001, the individual sector - the traditional household plots and the newly created family peasant farms - produced 97% of agricultural goods in Azerbaijan. After 2001, however, the share of the individual sector began to slip, and in 2020-2023 it stood at about 90% of GAO. The cultivated area followed a similar pattern: the individual sector slipped from 98% of the cultivated total in 2015 to 90% in 2020–2023.

These production shares constitute a complete reversal of the agricultural production structure: at the end of the Soviet era, in 1990, agricultural enterprises produced 65% of Gross Agricultural Product (GAO) with the individual houseplot sector accounting for the remaining 35%. Even in 1990, however, the share of the individual houseplots in GAO was paradoxically high given their low share in agricultural land (less than 5%). This phenomenon, observed for all CIS countries, could be explained by the difference in cropping patterns: household plots specialized in labor-intensive crops (potatoes, vegetables, fruits) while corporate and peasant farms mainly produced extensive crops (grain, industrial and feed crops).

The loss of land by agricultural enterprises adversely affected crop production and livestock headcounts. The share of crops in the GAO of farm enterprises plummeted from 80%-90% during the first decade of independence (1990–1999) to a low of 20% between 2003-2008 and eventually rebounded to around 50% in the 2020s. In the private sector, on the other hand, the crop-livestock production shares fluctuated in a narrow range between 40% and 60% and stabilized around 50% since 2014. The changes in livestock herd have been even more dramatic: the farm enterprises lost virtually all their cattle as 98% of the cattle headcount ended up in the individual sector. It is the private sector production that determined the evenly balanced crop-livestock shares for the country.

By all standard measures - land, livestock herd, output - the agriculture of Azerbaijan is now completely individualized. The traditionally dominant corporate-farm sector has practically vanished: all farm resources are concentrated in the individual sector, which produces the lion's share of the agricultural output.

== Agricultural exports ==
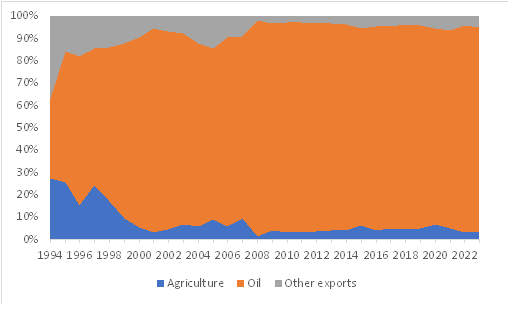
Structure of Azerbaijan's exports 1994-2023

Azerbaijan's exports are highly undiversified: oil has been the main export since 2000, when it first reached 90% of the total value of the country's exports and has remained at that level thereafter. While agricultural exports exceeded on average 20% of the total value of exports between 1994 and 1997, they have dropped to 5% or less since 2000.

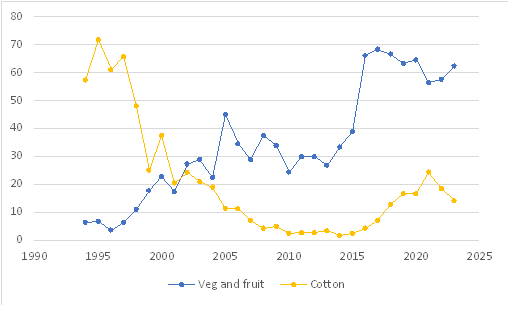
Azerbaijan's exports of vegetables and cotton in percent of total agricultural exports 1994-2023

Main agricultural exports are fresh fruits and vegetables (primarily tomatoes) and cotton, which in aggregate accounted for three-quarters of agricultural exports in 2023. Wine and tobacco, Azerbaijan's other traditional exports, accounted for only 7% of the value of agricultural exports in 2023, down from more than 20% on average in the 1990s. Particularly hard hit were tobacco exports, which peaked at 33% of agricultural exports in 2001 and then declined to less than 2% in 2023.

Cotton exports remained depressed at substantially less than US$50,000 annually between 1998 and 2016 and then exhibited a spurt of growth rising to $270,000 in 2021. If this was the outcome of the State Program for the Development of Cotton-Growing, its effect was not long-lasting as already in 2023 cotton exports collapsed to $163,000, a drop of 40% in just two years.

Azerbaijan's agricultural exports show clear long term growth (in current U.S. dollars), despite the uneven year-to-year changes, displaying both positive and negative outcomes. Against the background of considerable variability in specific exports, the dominant category of fresh fruits and vegetable leads with steady, almost linear growth since 1994, reaching nearly $730,000 in 2023 (62% of all agricultural exports).

== Government intervention and support in agriculture ==
The government of Azerbaijan has always played an active role in the development of agriculture. In the Soviet period and still after independence, in the 1990s, the Ministry of Agriculture of Azerbaijan ran procurement centers dispersed throughout the country for government purchase of most of the output of tobacco, cotton, tea, silk, grapes, and grain. The Ministry thus effectively suppressed private marketing initiatives in agriculture. Today, the Ministry has drastically reduced direct state purchases of agricultural products, and its support toolbox for agriculture includes various market measures such as grants, tax exemptions to producers, subsidies of machinery (combines, tractors, harvesters, and irrigation equipment), pesticides, and fertilizers. Import-substitution policies involving high tariffs on food products were prioritized until 2018–2019, but recently the whole structure of import tariffs has been streamlined, and in 2023 processed agricultural products and produce are all typically charged a flat 15% tariff. Land improvement, support and development of rural infrastructure, development of villages, and improvement of agricultural management are provided as part of government support to the agricultural sector. As a result of these promotions, the Azerbaijani government aims to increase productivity, stimulate technical and technological renewal, growth and diversification of agricultural exports, an efficient organization of state support, improvement of the mechanism for subsidizing, development of large farms, provision of support to small farms, etc.

State programs relating to various crops and agricultural issues are another tool of government intervention. In an attempt to arrest and reverse the decline of some of Azerbaijan's traditional agricultural products - citrus, tobacco, tea, cotton, rice, sericulture, viticulture, winemaking - the government has approved a series of state programs encouraging the development of the corresponding prioirity branches of agriculture within specified time frames ranging from 2017–2018 to 2025–2027. Procedurally, the state programs are approved by Orders of the President with professional inputs from the Ministry of the Economy and the Ministry of Finance and oversight by the Ministry of Agriculture. Unfortunately, the official sites of these ministries do not provide any public information on the scope of these programs. Furthermore, no results or outcomes are reported for the programs that reached the end of their allotted time frame (tobacco growing 2017–2021, cotton growing 2017–2022, viticulture 2012–2020). The Ministry of Agriculture has a range of investment encouragement programs for agriculture. One of the priority tasks explicitly specified in government documents is the rehabilitation of the agricultural sector in Nagorno-Karabakh, which had been outside Azerbaijan's control for nearly 30 years until the signing of the 2023 ceasefire agreement that ended the war.

The Food Safety Agency of the Republic of Azerbaijan, established by Presidential decree in 2017, is the central executive authority conducting veterinarian and phyto-sanitary control at all stages of the food chain, including primary production, procurement, processing, packaging, storage, transportation, and trade (including import-export operations). Its mandate is of primary importance for ensuring the safety of domestic consumers and for enabling international export-import transactions.

== Government support from the state budget ==
According to the statistics of 2013, there were 871,220 rural farms and households, 2,343 agricultural enterprises, 2,593 farms of individual entrepreneurs, and 531 ventures that operate in the agricultural sector of Azerbaijan.

In 2012, the state allocated 468.2 million AZN (US$596.4 million) to the agricultural sector. In 2011, this number was 444.7 million AZN (around US$566.5 million). It was estimated that in 2012, $247 was spent from the state budget per hectare of land suitable for agricultural production, including both crops and livestock. Additionally, the volume of direct and indirect subsidies allocated by the government to the agriculture sector in 2012, was around 611 million AZN (more than US$778.3 million- 100 US Dollars = 78.5000 Azerbaijani Manats on 12/31/2012).

The overall funds allocated from the state budget to the agro-industrial complex was 878.9 million AZN in 2011–2012. 485.7 million AZN which was accounted for 55.3 percent of total funds spent on the agro-industrial complex from the state budget was due to loans provided under state guarantee and irrigation and water management. 13.7 percent of this fund was in the form of direct subsidies, 9 percent on soft loans, 6.3 percent on fertilizers, machinery, and breeding animals, 4.4 percent on forestry, fishing, hunting, and environmental measures, and so on.

As a direct result of state intervention in the agricultural sector, in January 2013, agricultural production increased 4.5 percent in Azerbaijan to 187.5 million AZN (growth in vegetable and crop production by 4.9 percent and in livestock by 4.5 percent). The exports of agricultural products (fruit and vegetable) from Azerbaijan amounted to US$276.7 million in January–June 2018 and it was 27 percent more than in 2017.

For 2019, the farmers will be provided with loans worth 10 million AZN to through the State Service on Management of Agricultural Projects and Credits under Azerbaijan's Agriculture Ministry.

== Agrarian Insurance Fund ==
A potentially significant event for Azerbaijan's agricultural sector was the establishment of the Agrarian Insurance Fund of the Republic of Azerbaijan and approval of its Statute in August 2019 by Presidential Decree No. 809. In this legislation, agricultural goods of plant and animal origin were recognized as the subject matter of agrarian insurance throughout the supply chain, including import and export transactions. The legislation introduced the notion of an institute of independent experts in agrarian insurance; established a publicly accessible information system of agrarian insurance; and created a fund through which the government subsidizes agrarian insurance for farmers.

== Labor practices: women and children ==
Azerbaijan has the seventh highest proportion of women working in agriculture, forestry and fishing in the world.

In 2014, Azerbaijan was listed among the countries resorting to child labor in cotton production. In 2023, a U.S. Department of Labor report on labor conditions in Azerbaijan indicated the use of child labor in agriculture (mainly cotton harvesting and production) and street work (including begging, vending, washing cars). The report stated that Azerbaijan made minimal advancement in efforts to eliminate the worst forms of child labor, in part due to a law that continues a moratorium on all worksite labor inspections and may thus leave potential violations of child labor laws undetected in workplaces. In addition, the priority crop production system instituted by Azerbaijan's government creates a risk that farmers and local officials may turn to exploitative labor practices, including child labor, with regional and local government officials typically held responsible for mobilizing sufficient labor to meet production targets for priority crops, mainly cotton.

== Production statistics of the agriculture industry for 2018 ==
Azerbaijan produced in 2018:

- 2.0 million tons of wheat;
- 916 thousand tons of barley;
- 898 thousand tons of potato;
- 609 thousand tons of tomato;
- 307 thousand tons of watermelon;
- 277 thousand tons of sugar beet;
- 277 thousand tons of apple;
- 247 thousand tons of maize;
- 235 thousand tons of onion;
- 233 thousand tons of cotton;
- 223 thousand tons of cucumber;
- 167 thousand tons of grape;
- 160 thousand tons of persimmon (5th largest world producer);
- 108 thousand tons of cabbage;

In addition to smaller quantities of other crops, like melon (94 thousand tons), pear (52 thousand tons) and apricot (28 thousand tons).

Production in 2018:

Product	Unit	Amount
Meat	tons	265.3
Milk	tons	2 080 437
Egg	Thouthand units	1 676 213
Wool	tons	15,8
Vegetable	tons	1 521,9
Potato	tons	898 914
Fruits and berries	tons	1 010 816,3
Grape	tons	167 591,4
Melon production	tons	94 668
Cereals and dried pulses	thsd.tons	3 309,2
Sunflower for seed	tons	23 586
Green tea leaves	tons	868,6
Tobacco	tons	6,3
Cocoon	Thsd.tons	513,9

Cultivated area, 2018:

Product	Total cultivated area (hectares/thousand hectares)
Cereal and dried pulses	1 083,1
Wheat	679,1
Barley	19,4
Grain maize	31,7
Cotton	132,5
Sunflower for seed	11 566
Sugar beets	8 562
Tobacco	?
Potato	59 318
Vegetable	69 499
Melon production	20 913

== Food safety projects ==
Azerbaijan has identified food safety as a priority area, but current food safety and certification practices adhere to national and CIS standards that are not aligned with EU and WTO requirements. Azerbaijan has approved several laws and ratified international agreements to stimulate the establishment of a modern food safety system and to harmonize national regulations with international norms and requirements. The Azerbaijan Food Safety Agency (AFSA) was established in 2017 with the responsibility to oversee these efforts and to implement the State Program of Food Safety 2019-2025 Action Plan. The Azerbaijan Food Safety Institute (AFSI) was established under the Agency in 2018 to act as the risk-assessment body in the food safety system that AFSA is setting up in compliance with international requirements. AFSI also acts as a liaison office with the private sector and provides food safety-related consulting and training services to entrepreneurs. A new Food Safety Law was adopted in June 2022.

The AFSA is responsible for implementation of relevant national policies and management of officially approved sanitary and phytosanitary controls (i.e. animal health, food safety, plant health) at all stages of the food chain, including primary production, processing, packaging, storage, transportation, registration, inspections, certification (including import-export operations), border control, as well as the protection of consumer rights and the environment. Technical assistance to AFSA was provided through the Azerbaijan Competitiveness Improvement Project (ACIP), jointly financed by the World Bank and the Government of Azerbaijan (2013-2021), with the objective of facilitating the access of agricultural producers to markets by strengthening sanitary and phytosanitary services.

The Azerbaijan Standardization Institute (AZSTAND) is responsible for developing quality standards (voluntary product specifications) and technical regulations (mandatory product specifications) that constitute the basis of the country's sanitary and phytosanitary system. Azerbaijan created a new law on technical regulations based on EU regulations. Its main purpose is to protect the life and health of the population, as well as the environment. The principles and requirements of the World Trade Organization (WTO) and related agreements are considered in the new law.

== See also ==
- Agrarian reforms in Azerbaijan
- Silk industry in Azerbaijan
- Food industry in Azerbaijan
- Azerbaijani wine
- Animal husbandry in Azerbaijan
