= Sheep farming in Azerbaijan =

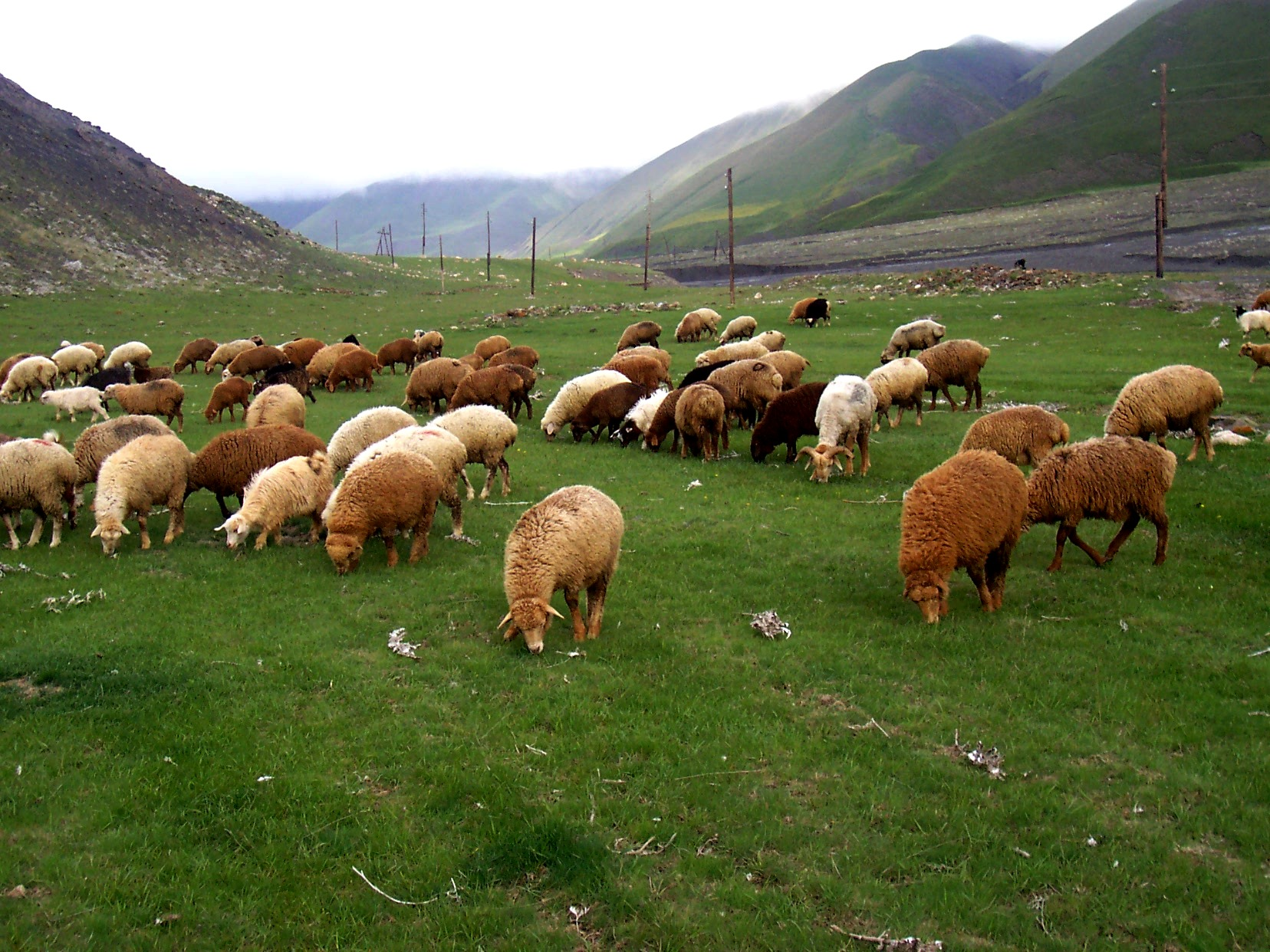
Grazing herd

Sheep farming in Azerbaijan is directed to the production of meat, fiber (wool) and dairy products. It is considered as an old animal husbandry branch and usual for around the country. Production in variety fields such as wool, meat and dairy products makes sheep farming leading animal husbandry field in the country. There are few pasture areas in Azerbaijan and it shows negative impact on the productivity of the sheep breeding.

== Trends in statistics ==
According to the statistics in 2014 there were 8.7 million sheep and goats in the country. The production of mutton and wool in the country are respectively, 70 000 tons and 17 000 tons. Statistics reveal that there were got about 2 kg wool from per sheep in a year.

== Breeds ==
Native aboriginal breed is Karabakh sheep and local conditions are considered convenient for farming. Their physical appearance is big and light gray or brown colored. Compared to the other breeds their food demand is less but their weight is high. The main sheep and rams weigh respectively, up to 50 and 80 kilos. They are able to travel 25 kilometers in a day. They are resistant to the local conditions and diseases. People get more than 130 lambs from each hundred sheep.

Another native sheep breed is Garadolag. They are mainly spread in the mountainous pastures in the country. This breed is popular for their high productivity of dairy products, large and sophisticated physical and skeleton structure. The average weight of the lambs is approximately 4-6 kilos, but average weight of the main sheep reaches 46 kg, while the live weight of the rams is up to 80 kg. In comparison, Garodolag breeds are widely used in cross-breeding than other breeds.

Azerbaijan Mountain Merino breed was established in 1947 by the participation of F. Malikov and M. Sadigov. In order to create new breed, they cross-breed foreign Merino breeds with Askania in the farms of Shamkir and Gadabay. This breed distinguishes for their high productivity of wool. People get approximately, 4-5 kilos wool from the main sheep and up to 10 kg from rugs.

Absheron sheep belongs to the Caucasian group. They are long tailed, semi-rough woolen and high productive sheep. Mainly distinguished as a fast-growing, extreme climate resistant and large-sized species. By the initiative of the agricultural scientist Najaf Najafov Absheron breed was created as a result of the cross-breeding with local Qala sheep. Their adaptation to extreme conditions was scientifically researched and confirmed. Their semi-rough wool is widely used in carpet weaving around the country.

Balbas breed is widely spread in Nakhchivan Autonomous Republic and considered as a largest sheep. In the neighboring countries such as, Armenia, Iran and Turkey they widely spread. Average sheep are tall and white with black spots on their legs. They are woolen and hornless. The weight of the main sheep is 50 kg and rugs are 65 kilos. Their tails weigh about 16-20 kilos.

Bozak sheep are cultivated in the western part of the country especially in Ganja – Gazakh region and considered as an old and native breed. At the same time, they spread in the neighboring countries like Georgia and Armenia. The weight of the main sheep is about 50 - 65 kilos and they are mainly gray colored. The name of the breed comes from their colors.

Caro sheep are mainly spread on the south-eastern districts of Azerbaijan. They are mostly cultivated in Lankaran and considered as less productive breeds. During the lactation period, farmers get up to 60 liters of milk and less than three kilos wool. Their wool is basically white, brown and black and the main sheep weigh about 50 kg.

Herik sheep is mainly cultivated in Shaki, Gakh and a number of neighboring districts. They have several common signs with Lezgin sheep.

Lezgin sheep. In the 19th and 20th century this breed is widely spread in the country. The homeland of the Lezgin sheep is considered as Dagestan. That is why they are mostly cultivated in the bordering districts with Dagestan such as, Guba, Gusar, Balakan, Zagatala, Gakh, Shaki, Oguz and partly in Goychay and Agdash. Their productivity is not high, so the main sheep weigh 40 – 65 kg and 2 kg wool and up to 40 liters of milk people get during the farming. They are basically, white, gray or black-brown colored.

Mazhik sheep widespread in the areas of the Nakhchivan Autonomous Republic and Armenia, Turkey and Iran. They have a number of productive features that makes them more cultivated breed in the region. 130 liters of milk they can produce and their physical appearance is good. Rugs have horns and sheep are hornless. Their tail is up to 15 kg and wool is mainly golden or brown colored and not rough.

Gala sheep. This sheep was created as a result of the selection in Gala village is situated in Absheron peninsula. They are cultivated in a limited area. That is why Gala sheep is considered as sheep's papules. However, Gala sheep is also ancestor of the productive Absheron sheep breed which created by the scientist N. Najafov.

== See also ==
- Animal husbandry in Azerbaijan
- Agriculture in Azerbaijan
