= Economy of Baku =

Baku is the capital city of Azerbaijan. On the coast of the Caspian Sea, in the Caucasus region, it is an international junction of land and sea trade routes and the center of Azerbaijan's economic life. The city's economy encompasses a number of sectors.

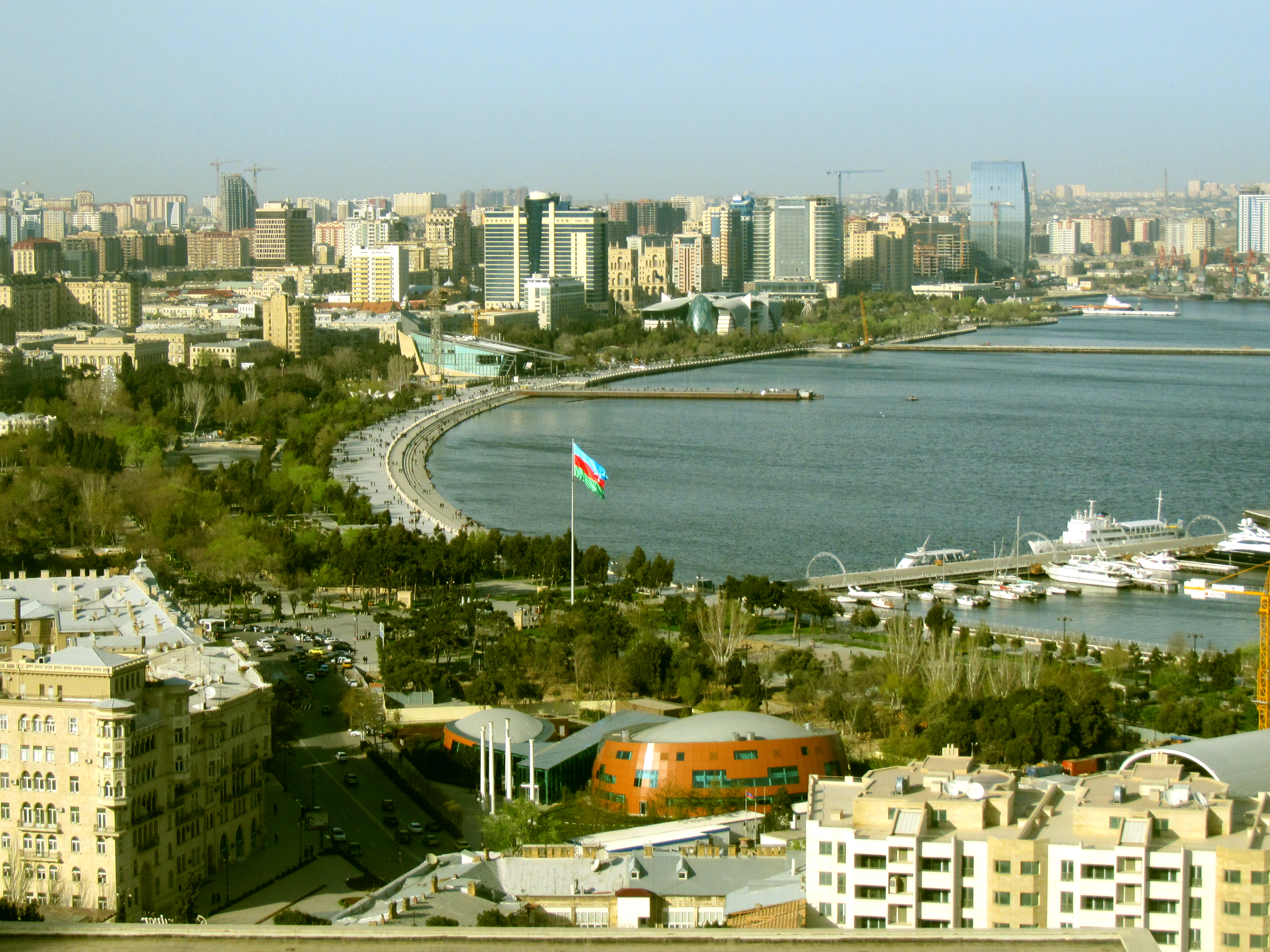
View of Baku

== Industry ==
=== Heavy industry ===
Baku's main branches of heavy industry include oil and gas extraction, shipbuilding, steelmaking, mechanical engineering, and chemical manufacturing. The city also manufactures equipment for local and international oil and gas extraction, including a deep foundation plant in Sahil, and engineering plant in Keshla and clay and steel plants in Binagadi.

The Baku Steel Company meets local demand for casting imported steel. It has two electric arc furnaces and three rolling lines, with an annual steel-production capacity of 1,000,000 tonnes. The company manufactures rebar, square and round billets, channels, rolled wire, angle bars, I-beams, square and round rods, and related products. Steel Structures, the open joint-stock company Baku Steel Construction, and several other plants produce products for the construction industry. Radio-electronics factories and car and shipbuilding plants (Baku Shipyard) also operate in the city. The Gozdak, Shuvalan, and Korgöz quarries surrounding Baku produce sawn stones. Reinforced concrete, asbestos and brick plants, and the Garadagh cement plant produce construction materials.

=== Light industry ===
Clothing is an important part of Baku's light industry, in addition to shoe and leather plants. Baku-Glass produces bottles for juice and alcoholic beverages, and Baku Sewing House manufactures coats, jackets, suits and casual clothing. Caucasus Paper Industry is one of the largest producers of cleansing and hygienic paper in Azerbaijan and the South Caucasus.

=== Mining ===
Oil production decreased by 6.2 percent from 2016 to 2017, and commercial gas production decreased by 2.2 percent.

Crude oil and natural gas
Product	January–November 2017	January–November 2016 (%)	1 December 2017 stockpile
Crude oil (including gas condensate), thousand tons	34,889.8	93.8	216
Natural gas, million cubic meters	16,551.4	97.8	-

Other mining products
Product	January–November 2017	January–November 2016 (%)	1 December 2017 stockpile
Limestone for construction, thousand tons	112.3	80.4	-
Gravel, crushed stone	31,942.6	167.6	-
Gypsum and anhydride, tons	19,739.8	130	2,585.6

Total 2017 oil production was m2,469.2 million, a 9.2-percent decrease from January to November of the previous year. Petrol production increased by 4.7 percent, petroleum coke by 6.8 percent, bitumen by 22.7 percent, and lubricating oil by 370 percent. Diesel-fuel production decreased by 20 percent, mazut fuel oil by 42.6 percent, and white petrolatum by 6.9 percent.

Oil production (thousand tons)
Product	January–November 2017	January–November 2016 (%)	1 December 2017 stockpile
Petrol for cars	1,097.6	104.7	55.2
Petrol for petrochemical use	169	96.5	1.1
White petroleum	539	93.1	13.4
Diesel fuel	1,718.4	80	53.1
Mazut	262.5	57.4	7
Lubricating oil	33.6	370	8.2
Bitumen	208.8	122.7	2.9
Petroleum coke	197.5	106.8	1.3

=== Manufacturing ===
From January to November 2017, goods with a value of m4,843.7 million were manufactured.

Period	Change from previous year (%)	Change from previous year (%)
Period	2016	2017
January	99.2	102.0
January–February	103.5	92.5
January–March	103.8	84.1
January–April	106.2	89.6
January–May	106.4	89.6
January–June	112.7	89.3
January–July	103.9	89.3
January–August	98.9	89.2
January–September	99.9	87.9
January–October	100.1	89.4
January–November	100.0	89.9
January-December	99.1	102.0

== Agriculture ==
Baku's agricultural sector has been developed in the city's suburbs. Due to its semi-desert, dry-steppe climate, olives, pistachios, almonds and saffron are also grown.

Total area (ha)	2010	2013	2014	2015	2016	2017
Potatoes	20	20	10	10	18	19
Vegetables	459	606	456	509	688	1196
Plants and flowers	13	10	10	11	11	11
Fruits and berries	1,277	1,466	1,483	1,526	2,899	2,927
Grapes	1,498	1,435	1,441	1,441	1,300	1,303
Production (tons)						
Potatoes	50	136	36	50	134	128
Vegetables	13,868	23,861	7,561	8,693	12,812	53,343
Plants and flowers	105	80	174	322	103	102
Fruits and berries	3,972	6,999	7,125	6,022	4,688	5,313
Grapes	14,800	9,600	8,918	9,433	7,963	8,009
Production (centners per ha)						
Potatoes	25	68	34	50	76	67
Vegetables	158	294	154	135	91	50
Plants and flowers	84	80	174	293	93	93
Fruits and berries	31.1	47.8	48.6	41.1	18.4	19.2
Grapes	23.1	47.8	39.9	47.8	41.2	40.8
Total livestock						
Cattle (including water buffalo)	5,343	5,963	6,203	6,022	8,289	8,341
Sheep and goats	2,755	2,710	3,155	2,826	3,880	4,360
Pigs	15,938	16,480	16,466	13,540	18,872	18,359
Birds	578	438	447	422	125	152
Animal products (tons)	393,465	334,126	298,699	557,474	504,016	875,447
Meat	1,180	1,994	1,996	2,302	2,434	2,406
Milk	3,799	5,082	3,910	4,058	4,245	4,669
Eggs	10,252	7,301	5,597	9,678	7,458	7,391
Wool	36	36	31	31	27	31

== Tourism ==
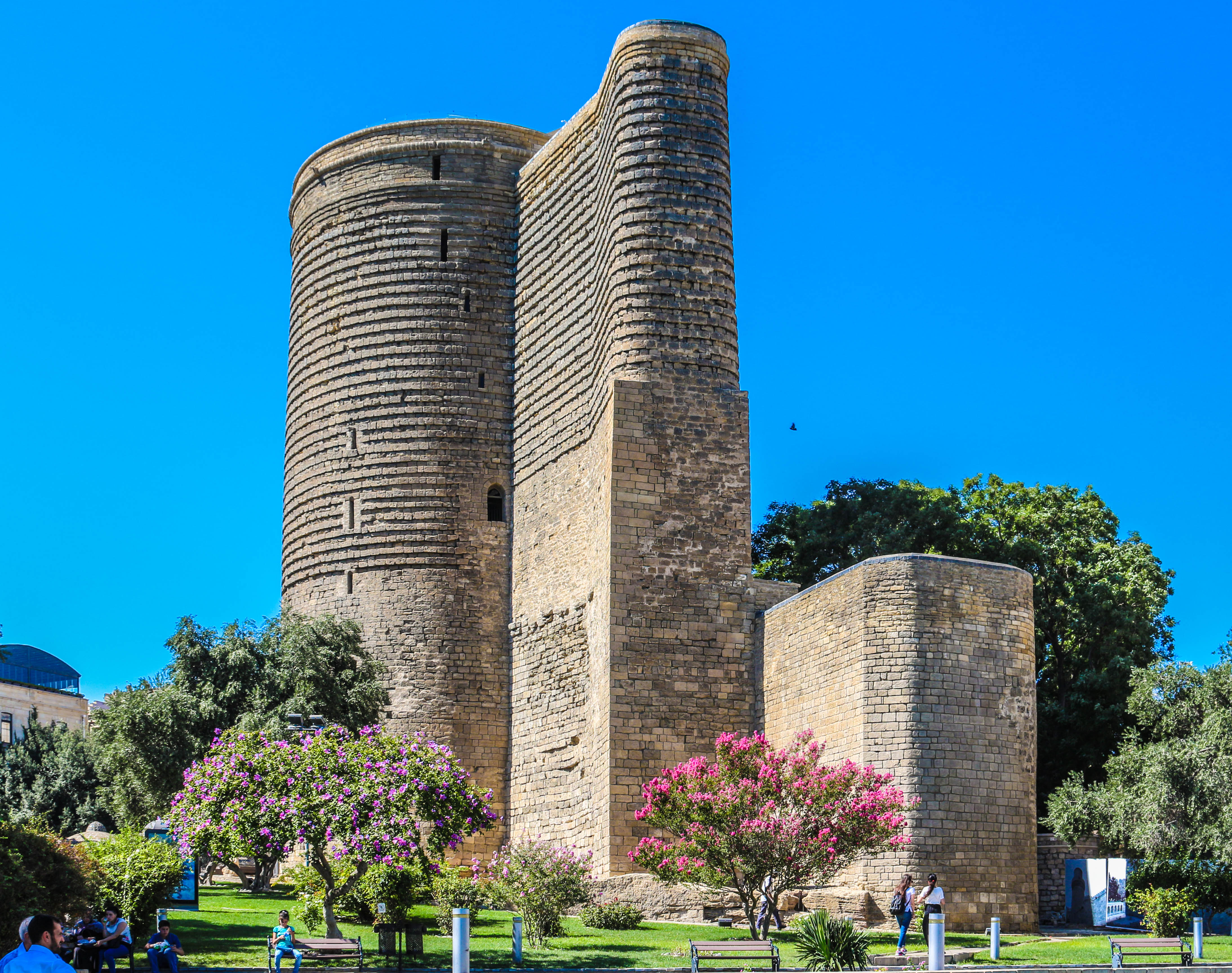
The Maiden Tower, Baku’s most popular tourist attraction.

Baku, the capital of Azerbaijan, receives 2.5 million tourists a year. According to Ilya Umansky, vice president of the Association of Tour Operators of Russia, Baku has become a more popular tourist destination in recent years.

Tourism in the city of Baku, Azerbaijan.

Tourism in Baku

== Construction ==
The new Baku Higher Oil School campus, the new Narimanov District Court administrative building, a bridge in Pirallahı raion, the Pirallahi Solar Power Plant, the Balakhani Industrial Park, the Baku–Tbilisi–Kars railway, the Pirshagi-Novkhani road and the Binagadi-Novkhani-Corat highway were completed between January and November 2017. Almost three-quarters of the funds allocated to capital assets were spent on construction.

Construction costs, January–November 2017
	Total (thousand m)	January–November 2016 (%)
Baku	5,130,130	104
Raions
Binəqədi	227,090.3	97.9
Xətai	858,471.7	103.9
Xəzər	100,992.8	3.9 d.
Qaradağ	492,102.9	120.5
Nərimanov	476,879.7	112.3
Nəsimi	1,047,540.8	123.5
Nizami	168,072.8	43,2
Sabunçu	114,550.7	163.7
Səbail	1,073,628	85.7
Suraxanı	47,033.7	88
Yasamal	523,766.7	131.1

== Metallurgy ==
Baku is considered one of the country's largest metallurgy centers due to the availability of scrap metal, local energy resources (oil and natural gas) and a large, well-trained labor force. The city produces non-ferrous and ferrous metals.

== Transportation ==
Baku's transportation system consists of the Baku Metro, buses, and taxis. According to data from January to November 2017, freight transport by road increased by 1.6 percent over 2016 to 5,3021.2 thousand tons. Passenger transportation increased by 0.1 percent, to 623,024.1 thousand passengers. The number of metro passengers increased by 5.3 percent over 2016, to 207.6 million.

== Consumption ==
From January to November 2017, the cost of consumer products and services in Baku increased 2.2 percent over the same period of 2016 to m21,964.1 million. Non-governmental goods and services made up 95.6 percent of the total; retail goods and services in this sector increased by 1.7 percent over the previous year, to m21,001.3 million.

Consumer spending
Markets	January–November 2017 (million m)	2016 (%)
Total	21,964.1	102.2
On state property	962.8	115.1
On non-state property	21,001.3	101.7
Private enterprise	15,663.5	99.4

== Pipelines ==
The Baku-Novorossiysk, Baku-Supsa (Georgia) and Baku-Tbilisi-Ceyhan (Turkey since 2006) pipelines originate in Baku and transport Azerbaijani oil to the global market.

== See also ==
- Economy of Azerbaijan
