= Animal husbandry in Azerbaijan =

Animal husbandry in Azerbaijan is concerned with animals that are raised for meat, milk, eggs, leather, wool, fur and fibre production for people’s consumption in Azerbaijan.

== Production and procession ==
There are a number of improvement methods used in the local livestock processing and production fields.

- Maintaining stability in the procession of livestock products
- Meeting people’s demand for the livestock products by internal procession power
- Establishing new agriculture areas

During the recent years, more than 15 modern production complexes improved by leasing. They are Hachalmurad (Imishli district), Bayim Sarov (Samukh district), Balakurd (Goranboy district), Afatli (Agdam district), Agabayli (Aghjabadi district), Kharkhatan (Lankaran district), Qasimli (Masalli district), Mehdili (Barda district), Digah settlement (Absheron district).

== Classification ==
=== Cattle ===
Cattle and sheep are main species preferred by Azerbaijanis and considered the most productive livestock products in Azerbaijan. Meat procession is the second place in accordance with its value expression. This product does not meet local demand and its export level is low. Processed and canned meat are predominantly exported products in Azerbaijan. The convenient natural – geographical and climatic condition influenced the development of the cattle farming in the country. Beef cattle breeding in Azerbaijan mainly developed in the areas where are mountainous. In these areas, animals should be intensively fattened at the end of the lactation. Their high fatigue rate is when they are 15 – 18 months old.

The buffalo husbandry in Azerbaijan takes about more than 10% of the all-beef cattle. Buffalo husbandry is used by both dairy and production in Azerbaijan. Karabakh, Mil – Mugan, and Shirvan are mainly engaged areas for buffalo husbandry. “Azerbaijan” is considered as a homeland purebred of buffalo. During the 1970s – 1980s, cross-breeding was carried out by “Murrah” breed in order to increase dairy and pure meat production. By this way, milk and meat production increased by 20% – 30% and 10% - 15% respectively. Two methods are used in buffalo breeding in Azerbaijan:

- True breeding – by this way, homeland breed “Azerbaijan” is mated with same breed.
- Cross breeding – mating homeland breed with Indian “Murrah” breed for the increase of dairy production.

After the liquidation of the public farms in 1996, all buffalos were privatized. 99% of buffalos are kept in farmer or family farms. There are about 30 buffalo breeding farms in the country. Azerbaijan Public Union was established for buffalo farmers in 2001 in order to improve farms and solve problems in this area.

Zebu is also a specie of the domestic cattle that engaged in ancient times in the country. Azerbaijani zebu differs from zebus in other areas according to their typical form. They have black and black – brown colors and resistant to local conditions and diseases. The pure meat of Zebus production is up to 60%. Azerbaijani zebus are particular for Lankaran – Astara regions.

Family farms are engaged in dairy cattle breeding in Azerbaijan. Holstein Friesian cattle species are used as a bred for increasing dairy production.

=== Sheep breeding ===
The existing sheep breeds belong to various species in Azerbaijan. Along with native sheep breeds, there are different breeds from parts of the world. According to the recent statistics, there are more than 8 million sheep and goats in the country. 70 thousand tons of meat and 17 thousand tons of wool are produced. Sheep mainly increased for consumption of meat, wool and dairy products. Obtained wool classified as rough, semi-rough, semi-delicate and delicate wool. Sheep breeding is common for all regions of the country but delicate wool sheep are raised in mountainous areas and foothills. Armenian Semicoarsewool is raised as a rough woolen breed and Merino is raised for delicate wool in Azerbaijan. Besides, Karabakh and Garadolak are mainly raised breeds in Azerbaijan. Compared to other breeds these sheep can walk approximately 18 – 20 km per day. They are hot and dry weather resistant and quickly adapt to local conditions. However, breeds are resistant to tuberculosis and some other diseases, but frequently infect brucellosis, bruise, and mastitis. They show low productivity in the areas where are wet and swamp. Karabakh and Garadolak breed quickly. Farmers take about 120 – 130 lambs from per 100 sheep.

=== Horse breeding ===
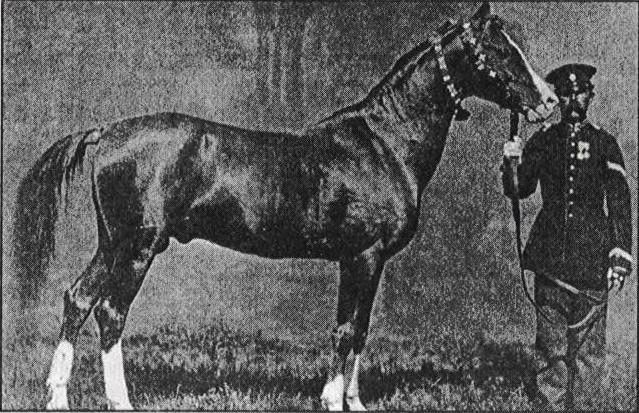
Karabakh horse

As a result of national selection Karabakh and Azerbaijan, horse breeds (also called Dilbaz) are created in the country and these breeds are included in 260 cultivated species of the world. At the end of the XVIII and early XIX centuries, Dilbaz horses created on the basis of crossbreeding with Eastern breeds. These horses are distinguished with their broad forehead, short head, narrow nose, long waist and back from other horse breeds. Their legs are relatively high and height is 152 cm. They mainly used in sports and light trailers. Karabakh horses widespread in the south – western regions such as Agdam, Barda, Baylagan, Agjabadi, Shusha, Khojali, Khojavand, Tartar, Jabrail, Kalbajar, and Fuzuli. Karabakh horses have been used for improving local breeds especially in Goranboy, Shamkir, Gadabay, Dashkasan, Goygol, Yevlakh, Tovuz districts, Guba – Gusar and Shirvan regions since 1850s. Nowadays, Aghdam horse breeding factory is developed and a number of selective breeding programs applied. These breeding programs cover the years 2012 – 2015.

=== Poultry ===
Chickens are predominantly used lying birds for egg and meat production in Azerbaijan. Over the recent years, about 100 million manats subsidiary were allocated for the improvement of the overall 15 broiler plants with procession capacity of 55 thousand tons of meat and about 250 million eggs. Statistics reveal that 64,4% of poultry meat and 45% of eggs were produced by industrial methods in 2014. Export of poultry products is regulated in accordance with decree 66 of the Ministers Cabinet of Azerbaijan dated April 21, 2009.

=== Beekeeping ===
In the recent years, the number of bee families have been risen to 238 thousand in Azerbaijan. A number of improved programs implemented in order to reach 310 000 bee families in 2020. 61% of the vegetation that bees take nectar accounted by Azerbaijan in the South Caucasus. This geographical condition increases the availability of beekeeping in the country. Every year, honey exhibitions and sale fairs are organized in order to expand the market scale of the beekeepers. The existing bee species are “Gray Caucasus”, Yellow Caucasus", “Gapaktapa” and “Gonagkand” in Azerbaijan.

== See also ==
- Sheep farming in Azerbaijan
- Agriculture in Azerbaijan
