= Economy of Guba =

Economy of Azerbaijani region

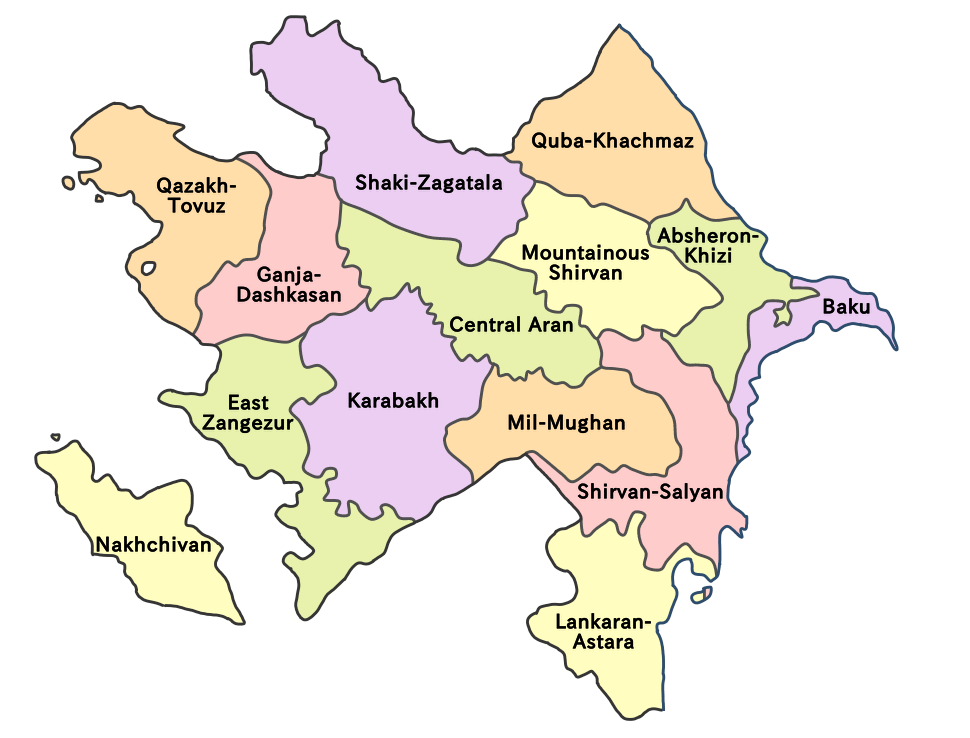
Map of the economic regions in the Republic of Azerbaijan. The Guba-Khachmaz economic region is located to the north-east of Azerbaijan.

Guba is a district found along the Guba-Khachmaz economic region spanning 7.66 thousand km^{2} in the north-east of Azerbaijan. The currency of Azerbaijan is the manat (code: AZN; symbol : ₼). The region is rich with natural resources, including natural gas, oil, sand, gravel and combustible shale.

Agriculture, construction, industry, and transportation form the core of the economy in Guba.

== Agriculture ==
Agriculture in Guba is primarily focused on the production of fruits and vegetables. There are numerous orchards within Guba territory. The main agricultural products of Guba are sunflowers, potatoes, grapes, cereal/dried pulses, sugar beets, hazelnuts, pomegranates and olives, but the region is also known for growing wheat and breeding cows.

In Guba, special breeds of sheep are raised and their wool is used for the local fur industry.

The total value of production of the main products was 213,183,000 manat in 2011, 2,596,595,000 manat in 2012, 2,262,579,000 manat in 2013, 2,264,253,000 manat in 2014, and 1,914,185,000 manat in 2015.

The total value of production of agriculture, forest farming and fishing goods increased by 17.4% from 2011 to 2015.

Statistics of agricultural sector in Guba

Production of main agricultural crops (tons)	2010	2012	2013	2014	2015	2016
Cereal crops	27121	49704	50605	46341	40159	36153
including wheat	23396	45029	45773	41781	33874	29864
Sunflowers	34	40	41	52	52	48
Potatoes	10471	10176	10850	11327	11616	11059
Vegetables	12601	14210	14840	15024	15418	15623
Garden plants	21	-	-	-	-	-
Fruits and berries	117130	118420	120198	122816	122314	124967
Grapes	67	78	29	31	74	74

Total area of sown agricultural crops (ha)	2010	2012	2013	2014	2015	2016
Cereal crops	13161	19557	19586	19680	14811	13974
including wheat	11331	17714	17716	17763	12432	11415
Sunflowers	24	27	27	33	35	32
Potatoes	1114	1060	1107	1150	1158	1084
Vegetables	1355	1450	1490	1503	1530	1549
Garden plants	2	-	-	-	-	-
Fruits and berries	14488	14476	14490	14724	14838	16070

Productivity of agricultural crops (centner/ha)	2010	2012	2013	2014	2015	2016
Grain	20.6	25.4	25.8	23.5	27.1	25.9
including wheat	20.6	25.4	25.8	23.5	27.2	26.2
Sunflower	20.8	19.7	20.0	20.9	20.9	21.0
Potato	94	96	98	99	100	102
Vegetable	93	98	100	100	101	101
Garden plants	105	-	-	-	-	-
Fruit and berry	92.0	86.1	86.1	87.7	84.1	85.6

Number of cattle	2010	2012	2013	2014	2015	2016
Large cattle	67294	66757	66499	65118	64639	63491
including cows and buffalo	26506	26318	26207	25842	25550	24731
Sheep and goats	267049	267527	267992	265031	264874	262452
Birds	202600	218018	201341	201470	196411	204728
Bee families	5824	6058	7480	6781	7241	6856

Production of cattle products (ton)	2010	2012	2013	2014	2015	2016
Meat	3600	3633	3684	3699	3711	3720
Milk	35341	37028	37992	38182	38277	38761
Eggs (in thousand)	11840	11994	12090	12146	12281	12283
Wool (in physical weight)	472	474	474	474	476	399

== Construction ==
In 2016, there were 6 construction enterprises in Guba. The total value of construction works was 46,620,000 manat.

In Guba, new power generation plants are being constructed to meet increased demand for electricity.

Statistics of construction works in Guba

	2010	2012	2013	2014	2015	2016
Given into usage						
Main funds (thousand manat)	14154.3	12371.2	13804.3	33145.1	17811.1	20184.4
Houses, total area (thousand square meters)	19.2	19.4	12.3	11.0	9.4	7.6
of which private houses	16.1	19.4	9.6	11.0	8.8	7.6
Investments in main capital (thousand manat)	57833.7	118292.2	77688.1	71197.6	31674.6	65971.7
including construction works	47596.4	116742.1	73941.3	67017.2	30116.1	62505.1
Number of construction companies	5	7	6	6	6	6

== Industry ==
As the agricultural sector in Guba has grown, other industrial sectors have developed. Light industry and food industry are core industries. Electric plants in Guba are a large part of the region's industry.

=== Food industry ===
Food industry includes the production of wine, meat and milk, bakery, canned fruit and vegetable, flour, etc.

=== Light industry ===
Carpet-making and small local sewing enterprises are part of light industry in Guba. In the villages of Guba, carpet-making continues to develop as a traditional handicraft art.

=== Construction materials industry ===
Guba also produces construction materials from local raw materials including sand, stone, and wood.

Statistics regarding industry in Guba

	2005	2006	2007	2008	2009	2010	2011	2012	2013	2014	2015	2016
Number of acting enterprises - total, unit	23	25	22	22	21	22	18	15	16	21	27	28
The number of individual entrepreneur registered for acting in industry, person	166	178	181	195	170	187	219	248	277	305	333	322
Volume of industrial products (works, services), at factual prices, thsd. manat	5 007	9 228	6 440	6470	8,523	12 970	16 795	19770	19247	22445	21069	22602
Index of actual volume of industrial products relative to previous year, at percentage	143.7	125.3	93.7	100.2	84.4	108.4	119.2	107.7	96,3	126.5	96.8	102.0
Share of non-state sector in volume of industrial products, at percentage	58.6	73.4	39.4	39.7	49.3	68.1	6.3	5.2	6,6	5.3	9.2	9.8
Products shipped, thsd. manat	2 614	8 032	7 174	6 430	8,581	13 060	16 799	19797	19036	22445	21198	21759
Stocks of ready-made products at the end of year, thsd. manat	408.2	2 299	1 601	1 631	1,568	1 457	42.4	9.0	220,2	214.2	85.0	927.9
Average payroll of employees, person	627	633	722	677	645	688	673	737	1025	929	632	704
Reception of employees during the year, person	377	190	309	205	311	394	33	116	153	256	244	394
Employees dismissed during the year, person	427	218	236	275	455	294	25	61	140	338	264	207
Payroll of employees at the end of year, person	712	617	795	670	442	645	623	665	665	796	581	746
Average monthly wages, manat	75.3	89.2	131.7	198.0	205.8	294.3	298.5	310.9	290,2	353.9	296.9	329.0
Main industrial manufacturing assets at the end of year, by balance value, value, thsd. manat	15 657	17 378	17 808	19 430	19,610	103564	105068	103764	109858	109854	109984	110090
relative to previous year, at %	102.5	111.2	103.2	107.0	100.7	5.3t.	107.3	98.8	105,5	100.0	100.3	100.1
Manufacture of main types of products in natural value												
Gravel, pebble, flint and crashed stone, ton	67377	110807	70747	36753	66,908	92 657	135456	97382	50147	114500	35200	24300
Masson's sand, thsd.ton	...	...	...	...	...	...	...	...	...	7.2	7.0	-
Bread and bakery products, thsd.ton	...	...	...	...	...	...	...	...	...	131.6	82.4	9.6
Canned fruits and vegetables, ton	3 722	4 485	2 741	6 912	1,749	795	-	-	119,4	-	1200	1627
Flour, ton	97.2	113.8	-	19.8	-	-	-	-	135,4	192.6	156.6	25.2
Carpets and carpet products, thsd.sq.m	0.2	0.1	0.2	0.2	0.1	0.07	0.05	0.1	0,1	0.08	0.05	0.05
Windows, French-windows and their frames of wood, unit	50	-	36	218	-	-	-	-	-	62	-	-
Gravestones, ton	...	...	...	...	...	...	...	...	...	647	567.2	-
Doors and sash pulley, of aluminium, unit	312	256	441	1 039	404	77	-	-	-	-	-	-
Plastic doors and sash pulley of plastic, unit	...	...	...	...	710	1 204	4 507	2562	2635	1000	3933	1618
Electric power, mln kwh	-	-	-	-	57.2	231.2	288.3	336.5	303	415.4	345.0	340.5
of which commodity	-	-	-	-	55.4	231.2	280.6	327.8	295.5	407.5	337.9	333.5

== Transportation ==
There are some roads that pass through the area of Guba. A 208 kilometer-long road along the Baku-Guba-border with Russia was built at a total cost of 493.3 million USD.

There are highways, telecommunication lines connecting Azerbaijan and Russia, and oil and gas pipelines also pass through the Guba-Khacmaz economic region.

Statistics regarding transportation in Guba

	2010	2012	2013	2014	2015	2016
Transportation of goods (1000 ton)	690	793	838	861	897	925
Turnover of goods (mill. ton km)	93.2	111.5	118.7	122.1	127.4	131.5
Transportation of passengers (1000 people)	17139	19862	21290	22427	23862	24816
Turnover of passengers (mill. people)	127.3	147.0	157.7	165.3	175.9	183.1
Total number of automobiles	8067	8489	9724	10989	12230	13504

== See also ==
Economy of Azerbaijan
