= Privatization in Azerbaijan =

Privatization in Azerbaijan is the process of transferring state properties to private owners. After Azerbaijan attained independence in the aftermath of the Soviet Union's collapse, the new government undertook privatization as part of its shift towards a market economy. This privatization effort was undertaken amid widespread corruption.

Each Azeri citizen was given a booklet of four vouchers for free in which they could buy shares in formerly state-owned companies. Speculators from Azerbaijan and abroad bought vouchers from Azeris. A number of formerly state-owned assets have ended up in the hands of companies, often offshore companies, secretly owned by family members of Azerbaijan's political and economic elites, including Azerbaijani president Ilham Aliyev's family. According to a 2009 court filing, the last known whereabouts of two-thirds of the vouchers were in 28 shell companies owned by Azerbaijani political elites.

== History ==
After the collapse of the Soviet Union, the people of Azerbaijan gained independence, the government undertook economic reforms aimed at the application of market mechanisms in the economy. First of all, the state control over the prices was abolished and the liberalization of the economy began. In 1992, 80% of the prices were liberalized in Azerbaijan.

The first state body which is responsible for the privatization of the state property was established in 1992 and the law "On privatization of state property" was adopted in 1993 in Azerbaijan.

=== The privatization of the housing Fund ===
Before the collapse of the Soviet Union, property privatization was not allowed. According to article 1 of the “About privatization of housing stock in the Azerbaijan Republic”, dated 26 January 1993:

“Citizens of the Azerbaijan Republic, and also the stateless persons which signed the contract on hiring of premises with the owner of the state or public housing stock have the right to gratuitously transfer the premises (houses) occupied by them to personal property under the terms and according to the procedure, the established this Law.”

== Stages ==
The privatization process in Azerbaijan can be divided into three stages in the formulation and implementation of the legislative basis:

=== Pre-privatization preparation ===
Preparatory stage characterizes the period up to 1996 and is called initial privatization. At this stage, along with establishment of the conceptual foundations for privatization, this process has been tested practically in the direction of privatization of taxi and buses and commercialization of the trade network. Main discussions on conceptual issues were carried out in government and parliament. As a result of these discussions, the law on State Property Privatization and the First State Program were adopted during the preparatory phase and the foundations of the legal basis of this process were established.

=== The first stage ===
The first stage describes the implementation of the State Program on Privatization of State Property in Azerbaijan during 1995-1998. At this stage, the establishment of a normative legal base of privatization and the forming process of its complex legal base has been completed. This period is characterized by the rapid privatization of small enterprises and the corporation of medium and large enterprises. Free distribution of privatization shares to all citizens of the country born before January 1, 1996, also took place during this period.

=== The second stage ===
The second stage has been continuing since 1999. During this period, the pace of privatization has decreased and interruptions have been observed during this period. During the period, a new legal basis of privatization was created and subsequent processes were regulated in accordance with the new Law on State Property Privatization and the provisions of the Second State Program. The changes in the arrangement and management of the organizational issues of the privatization process have coincided with this period and as a result, the State Property Committee has become the Ministry. Later, it was abolished and the Ministry of Economic Development was established on its base and several other economically-oriented public institutions, and the authority to privatize state property was entrusted to the relevant department of the Ministry.

== II State programme ==
The "II state program of privatization of state property in the Republic of Azerbaijan" was adopted in 2001. The purpose of this program was [6]:

- Implementation of privatization in accordance with the requirements of the law on privatization.
- Development of the level of the economy by creating competitive environment.
- Increase in the number of private owners.
- The attraction of foreign investment to the state economy.
- The whole privatization of the objects and enterprises within the framework of the State program I.

== Report ==
According to the State Statistical Committee (SSC) 01.01.2001, 1169 state-owned enterprises with a charter capital of 2445.9 billion manat, including 117 state-owned enterprises with a total charter capital of 543.3 billion manat in the industry, 321 enterprises with a charter capital of 1082.9 billion manat in the agrarian sector, 140 enterprises with a charter capital of 155.0 billion manat in transport section, 135 state-owned enterprises with a charter capital of 157.6 billion manat in the construction section and other enterprises have been transformed into joint-stock companies.

=== Main indicators of the first stage of privatization ===
Indicators as of January 1, 2001	
Number of privatized small enterprises	31226
The number of privatized medium and large enterprises	1169
Total number of shareholders	60721
The number of all checks used in privatization (in units)	659077

== See also ==
Economy of Azerbaijan
