= Small and medium enterprises in Azerbaijan =

Small and medium-sized enterprises are called as KOS (kiçik və orta sahibkarlıq) or KOM (kiçik və orta müəssisələr) in Azerbaijan. SMEs have a leading position in the provision of economic growth and employment in Azerbaijan.

== Classification of SMEs ==
Azerbaijan also gave their categorization both relating to the number of employees work at the company and annual turnover. Categorization of enterprises is indicated like below:

Categorization of enterprises relating to their size	Number of employees	Annual turnover (AZN)
Small enterprises	< 25	< 200 000
Medium-sized enterprises	25 < 125	200 000 < 1 250 000
Large enterprises	125 <	1 250 000 <

Governmental Statistic Committee defined this classification by taking into account various economic fields as below.

The category of entrepreneurship	Size of employees	Annual turnover (AZN)
Industry and construction	< 50	< 500 000
Agriculture	< 25	< 250 000
Wholesale trade	< 15	< 1000 000
Retail trade, transport, service and other economic activities types	< 10	< 250 000

Small and medium-sized enterprises are divided into two groups in Azerbaijan.

- Individual entrepreneurs, the sole owner of the enterprise. Individual entrepreneurs are persons involved in the business sphere without the formation of any legal entity and possess unlimited liability.
- Small and medium-sized enterprises, that is, legal entities, in which individual entrepreneurs are legally considered as small businesses. Individuals who register as a legal person are classified according to two kinds of indicators: the number of employees and in accordance with its annual turnover.

In term of the number of enterprises and employees, individual enterprises occupy the main part of the small and medium-sized business field. According to the data of the Statistics Committee for the year 2015, the number of small businesses in all economic sectors of the country, was 196 327. The number of small entrepreneurs has increased in 2015 about 9 429 people compared to 2014. In addition, 178 163 of them were individual entrepreneurs. Individual entrepreneur mostly agglomerated in the sectors, especially trade, and take more revenues instead of minimum investments. Only a small number of entrepreneurs takes part in business activities, which requires high early investments and makes profit in the long-term. On average, individual entrepreneurs employ fewer people and in this way they decrease their expenditures and make more profit.

Legal entities are registered by central administrations of ministries and agencies, and inspected carefully by them. Small enterprise is an entrepreneurship that is controlled by legal entity and indicated in the disposal of the Ministry Cabinet. In this disposal the main principles for small and medium-sized enterprises are indicated.

== Programs for SME development ==
Direct the development of entrepreneurship in Azerbaijan started in 1990s. On December 12, 1992, government established "Regulations of the Republic of Azerbaijan National Entrepreneurship Support Fund". The approval of this fund let small and medium-sized enterprises take advantage from preferential loans. However, until 2001 the mechanism of the delivery to the entrepreneurship entities did not work properly. Heydar Aliyev’s on August 27, 2002 issued decree resulted the approval of "Regulations on National Entrepreneurship Support Fund of Azerbaijan Republic" and " The use of fund of National Entrepreneurship Support Fund of Azerbaijan Guidelines” was directed to the development of a mechanism for financing of investment projects of entrepreneurs. They began to issue loans with lower interest rates in the national currency, as well as, identification of the grace period to the first two-thirds parts of loans and credit's low percentage caused arising interest to these credits.

=== Strategic road map for the development of SMEs ===
SME development in the country based on the Strategic Road Map defined in order to achieve the strategic goals and to ensure maximum use of the opportunities identified as a strategic objective as follows:

- Further improvement of the regulatory framework in the business environment in order to enhance the impact of the SME into GDP
- Ensuring affordable and effective access to financing resources in order to create a sustainable network of SMEs
- Internationalization of SMEs and increase access to foreign markets in order to increase the country's foreign exchange reserves and ensure compliance with international standards of goods produced in the country
- Increasing the supply of quality products and services within the development of skilled workforce and development of SMEs focusing on regional markets
- Strengthening of research and development and promotion of innovation in order to increase the competitiveness of SMEs

Strategic Road Map defines the short, medium and long term directions of the economic reforms and development in SMEs. There are three main strategic views:

- until 2020
- the long-term view until 2025
- target view since 2025

=== Single window principle ===
"Single window" system applied based on the presidential decree issued on April 30, 2007. This principle provided for the registration of business entities and started to implement their online registration. Based on the principle E-Government portal has been created and implementation of the system started in 2009.

== See also ==
- List of companies of Azerbaijan
