= Science and technology in Azerbaijan =

Science and Technology in Azerbaijan. Azerbaijan National Academy of Sciences (ANAS) is considered as the central agency for science and technology in order to implement state policy in this field.

== Trends in science funding ==
Statistics reveal that Azerbaijan spent 0.2% of its gross domestic product (GDP) on science development in 2016. Since 2000 this trend has been stable. Azerbaijan’s share of scientific researches was 0.3% of GDP in 2000 and 2009. The share of expenditure on research in gross domestic product has decreased since 2009 to 0.2% of GDP (2016). Azerbaijan was ranked 94th in the Global Innovation Index in 2025.

== Scientific institutions and organizations ==
Azerbaijan has more than 35 scientific institutions.

== Science Development Foundation ==
Foundation was established in accordance with the presidential decree dated 2009 . The main directions of the foundation are maintenance of the scientific-technological potential in the country and application of this potential in the development of the economy, expanding the role of the science and technology in the solution of social problems and financing scientific investigations, programs, projects and other scientific events. Consequently, Scientific Development Foundation provides financial support for implementation of state’s scientific strategy.

== High Technologies Park of ANAS ==
High Technologies Park of Azerbaijan National Academy of Sciences was created in accordance with the presidential decree dated November 8, 2016 . The main objectives of the High-Tech Park are establishment of application mechanisms of the industry-driven projects, provision of technical innovation for mass production and enabling practical works in the field of science and technology.

== Notable scientists ==
Several scientists from Azerbaijan including Lotfi A. Zadeh in fuzzy set theory made significant contributions to both the local and international science community. Other notable Azerbaijani scientists include Nazim Muradov, Azad Mirzajanzade, Yusif Mammadaliyev, Lev Landau, Garib Murshudov, Kalil Kalantar, Alikram Aliyev, Masud Afandiyev, etc.

== Scientific publications ==
There are more than 20 periodically published scientific journals, including "Problems of Information Technologies", "Problems of the Information Society", scientific-practical journals and transactions of the Azerbaijan National Academy of Sciences in various fields of science.

Publication	Issues a year	Copies of annual edition	Languages
Azerbaijan and Azerbaijanis	1 issue a month, 4 quires volume	280	English/ Russian
Applied and Computational Mathematics	2	300	
Transactions of the Institute of Physiology	2	500	Azerbaijani/ Russian
Transactions of the Institute of Microbiology	1	100	Azerbaijani/ Russian
Transactions of the Institute of Soil Studies and Agricultural Chemistry	1	150	Azerbaijani/ Russian
Transactions of the Institute of Genetics and Selection	Non-periodical	200	Azerbaijani/ Russian
Transactions of the Institute of Zoology	Non-periodical	200	Azerbaijani/ Russian
Elturan	2 issues a year, 8 quires volume	1000	Azerbaijani
The journal of Problems of Eastern Philosophy	2 issues a year, 9 quires volume	250	Azerbaijani/ German / English/ French/ Turkish/ Persian/ Arabic
Qendershunaslig	1 issues a year, 11 quires volume	500	Azerbaijani/ English
The journal of Turkology of the Azerbaijan National Academy of Sciences	1 issues a year, 8 quires volume	250	Azerbaijani/ Russian
Processes Petrochemictry and Oil Refining	6		English/ Russian
The Azerbaijan Journal of Chemistry	4 issues a year, 8 quires volume	250	Azerbaijani/ Russian
The Azerbaijan Astronomical Journal	4 issues a year, 8 quires volume	250	Azerbaijani/ English/ Russian
Azerbaijan Journal of Physics	4 issues a year, 8 quires volume	250	Azerbaijani/ English/ Russian

Furthermore, there are a number of scientific magazines including 2 international magazines function under the Ministry of Education of Azerbaijan. The most of these magazines are published in the universities. 4 magazines are considered as a joint science magazines including scientific-technical and industrial magazine "Ecology and Water Industry", which is jointly published by AACU, ASRHE and Science-Production Association, Water Canal Scientific-research and Project Institute and Environment and Water Industry Scientific Research Institute.

== AMEA ==
The National Academy of Sciences of Azerbaijan is the main science association of the country. It was founded in 1945 as a branch of USSR Academy of Sciences.

Before 1945, Azerbaijani branch of USSR Academy of Science was named Society of investigation and study of Azerbaijan as a forerunner of Azerbaijan branch of USSR academy of science. Back then, the full Azerbaijani atlas with the geological map was published in three volumes.

In 1995, the National Academy of Sciences of Azerbaijan established a university network covering the main scientific institutions and organizations of the state structure in Azerbaijan.

In 2001, Academy of sciences gained the status of "National Academy of Science" by presidential decree.

== Source ==
This article incorporates text from a free content work. Licensed under CC BY-SA 3.0 IGO Text taken from UNESCO Science Report: the Race Against Time for Smarter Development, UNESCO, UNESCO publishing. To learn how to add open license text to Wikipedia articles, please see this how-to page. For information on reusing text from Wikipedia, please see the terms of use.
