= Azerigas =

Gas distribution company in Azerbaijan

Azerigas Production Union
- Native name: "Azəriqaz" İstehsalat Birliyi
- Company type: Subsidiary
- Industry: Natural gas distribution and sales
- Founded: 1923
- Headquarters: Baku, Azerbaijan
- Area served: Azerbaijan
- Parent: SOCAR

Azerigas, officially the Azerigas Production Union ("Azəriqaz" İstehsalat Birliyi), is the state-owned entity responsible for the transportation, distribution, and sale of natural gas within the Republic of Azerbaijan. Operating as a subsidiary of the State Oil Company of Azerbaijan Republic (SOCAR), the company manages the domestic gas supply network, ensuring service to residential, commercial, and industrial consumers across the country.

== History ==
=== Soviet era ===
The foundations of Azerbaijan's organized gas economy were laid in 1923, when an auxiliary department for gas production and processing was established under the Commodity Directorate of the "Azneft" Production Association. In 1936, this operation was reorganized as the "AzQaz" trust.

The institutional framework evolved further in February 1958 with the creation of the "Basqaz" (Grand Gas) Directorate under the Ministry of Communal Economy of the Azerbaijan SSR. In August 1969, following the appointment of Heydar Aliyev as the leader of Soviet Azerbaijan, the directorate was upgraded and transferred directly under the republican government as the "Basqaz" Directorate. In 1983, the State Gasification Committee was established on the basis of this directorate, which was later merged into the State Fuel Committee in 1989.

=== Post-independence and SOCAR integration ===
Following the collapse of the Soviet Union, the entity underwent significant restructuring to adapt to a market economy. In 1992, the State Fuel Committee, the "Azeriqazneqil" Production Association, and the Azerbaijan Scientific-Research Project Institute were consolidated to form the "Azeriqaz" State Company. In 1996, the state company was reorganized into a Closed Joint-Stock Company (CJSC).

A major structural shift occurred in July 2009, when the President of Azerbaijan issued a decree aimed at improving the management mechanisms of the national oil and gas industry. Under this directive, Azerigas CJSC was dissolved and integrated directly into the structure of the State Oil Company of Azerbaijan Republic (SOCAR). Since then, it has continued its domestic gas distribution and sales operations as a Production Union within SOCAR.

== Operations ==
Azerigas is responsible for receiving natural gas from centralized transmission supply points and ensuring its safe distribution through low and medium-pressure pipeline networks to end-users across Azerbaijan. The company also handles domestic gas metering, infrastructure modernization, and utility billing systems.

== See also ==
- Energy in Azerbaijan
- Petroleum industry in Azerbaijan
- SOCAR
