= Azerbaijan and the International Monetary Fund =

Azerbaijan joined the IMF on October 18, 1992 with the IMF opening its office in Azerbaijan's capital, Baku, in the same year. Azerbaijan pays 0.08% of the quotas received by the IMF and holds 0.11% of the total voting power. Since Azerbaijan's induction into the organization, the IMF has implemented several programs in Azerbaijan that foster economic growth and poverty reduction. Between 1995 and 2005, the IMF loaned Azerbaijan $577.3 million in order to provide support for the country's economic reform programs; Azerbaijan was able to fully repay these loans.

Projections for Azerbaijan's economy were optimistic in 2012. Inflation was projected to stay in the single digit alongside a projected GDP increase of over 5%. However the country does still have progress to make as Mohammed El Qorchi, the Chief of the IMF's Mission in Azerbaijan, asserted in 2017 that the country needed to speed up progress on reforming its banking sector so that it is more stable which will in turn generate more trust in the country's economic stability. The IMF is not pushing the banking reforms in any particular direction, but is interested in seeing progress in a positive direction for the country's economy.

In 2017, the IMF forecast a 1% growth rate for Azerbaijan. In the same year, during a meeting with IMF officials, representatives from Azerbaijan discussed fiscal consolidation, monetary tightening and the aforementioned banking sector reforms. The possibility of assistance to the Central Bank of Azerbaijan was also discussed. An agreement was reached to hold Article IV consultations in November 2017. Azerbaijan was included in a 2017 IMF outlook report for the Middle East where the IMF believes economic conditions are gradually improving, in part due to a preferable environment emerging in the global community. Despite this, progress will be hampered due to a need for these countries to enact some structural reforms and re-evaluating their positions on fiscal matters.
