= Araz Aliyev =

Azerbaijani Statesman and Economic Reformer

- Araz Əliyev
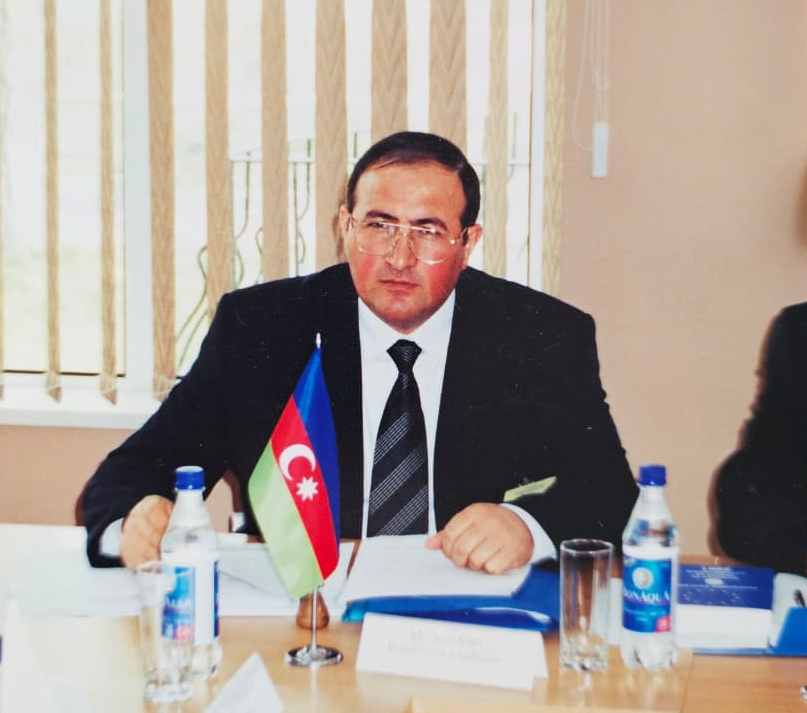

Deputy Head of the State Service for Antimonopoly Policy and Protection of Consumer Rights under the Ministry of Economy of the Republic of Azerbaijan
- In office 1 March 2007 – 9 June 2021
- President: Ilham Aliyev
- Minister: Shahin Mustafayev, Mikayil Jabbarov

Department Chief of the Department of Antimonopoly Policy of the Ministry of Economic Development of Azerbaijan
- In office 2001–2007
- President: Ilham Aliyev
- Minister: Farhad Aliyev, Heydar Babayev

Department Head of the State Committee for Antimonopoly Policy and Support of Entrepreneurship
- In office 1993–2001
- President: Heydar Aliyev

Lecturer / Senior Lecturer at Azerbaijan Agricultural Institute
- In office 1984–1993

Personal details
- Born: 10 May 1956 Goycha, Kasaman
- Died: 14 April 2026 (aged 69) Baku, Azerbaijan
- Education: Moscow State University; Azerbaijan State University of Economics

Araz Aliyev is an Azerbaijani public official and economic policy expert who worked at the State Service for Antimonopoly Policy and Consumer Market Control from 1993 till 2021. During his time working there he helped to establish consumer rights protection, fair competition policy and public awareness programs in Azerbaijan's governance system.

Aliyev has been involved in creating various state legislations, attended many academic seminars and public awareness activities in order to put consumer protection mechanisms in place and make the market transparent both for government and citizens during the first years of the independence of the country and continued his work later on to strengthen these regulations. He played a key role in the development of state policy on consumer market regulation and competition, participated and spoke at many local events and international conferences, forums and official meetings in foreign countries on antimonopoly regulation, competition policy, consumer rights protection and market supervision. These events brought competition authorities and regulatory institutions from various countries together to share international experience and discuss modern approaches and practices about competition and consumer protection. He was also involved with holding multiple educational forums in cooperation with universities and regional institutions to stress that consumer rights, fair market conditions and knowledge of citizens and entrepreneurs are very important in order to carry out the reforms and regulations in Azerbaijan swiftly and efficiently.

Aliyev's work has been associated with the institutionalization of Azerbaijan's antimonopoly and consumer market supervision frameworks and is now one of the central regulatory aspects of the State Agency for Antimonopoly and Consumer Market Control under the President of the Republic of Azerbaijan. State Service for Antimonopoly and Consumer Market Control lately was reorganized into the State Agency for Antimonopoly and Consumer Market Control under the President of the Republic of Azerbaijan and has been transformed directly to be responsible for preventing unfair competition, regulating monopolistic practices and promoting consumer market standards in line with national economic reforms till this day.

== Early life and career ==
=== Education ===
Araz Anvar oghlu Aliyev was born in 1956 in the village of Kasaman, Goycha District. He studied until the eighth grade in Kasaman and later completed his education at Narimanli Village High School. Later he was admitted to Azerbaijani National Economy Institute (Azerbaijan State University of Economics). During his studies due to his outstanding performance and grades, he was selected by the university and the Ministry of Higher Education to be transferred directly to Moscow State University to continue his education there. He graduated from the Moscow State University named after M. V. Lomonosov in 1979 and completed his postgraduate studies at the same university in 1983 as a Political Economist.

=== Career ===
Between 1984 and 1993, Aliyev worked at the Azerbaijan Agricultural Institute (Azerbaijan State Agricultural University) named after S. Agamalioghlu, where he served as a lecturer and senior lecturer. From 1993 to 2001, he held various positions within the State Committee for Antimonopoly Policy and Entrepreneurship Assistance of the Republic of Azerbaijan, including as chief specialist and department head.

From 2001 to 2007, he worked in the Antimonopoly Policy Department of the Ministry of Economic Development of Azerbaijan, serving as sector head and department chief. Between 2007 and 2010, he served as Deputy Head of the State Antimonopoly Service under the Ministry of Economic Development.

Since January 25, 2010, Aliyev has worked at the State Service for Antimonopoly Policy and Protection of Consumer Rights under the Ministry of Economic Development. From 2014 onward, he continued serving as Deputy Head of the State Service for Antimonopoly Policy and Protection of Consumer Rights under the Ministry of Economy of the Republic of Azerbaijan.

=== Awards ===
- "For Distinction in Civil Service" from the President of Azerbaijan (2012)
- "For Protection of Competition" from Antimonopoly Committee of Ukraine

== See also ==
- EU Competition Law
- Consumer Rights UK
- The Competition Code of the Republic of Azerbaijan
- Federal Antimonopoly Service
- Antimonopoly Committee of Ukraine
- Competition Law in Azerbaijan
- The Protection of Consumer Rights Is Our Priority.
