= Mikayil Jabbarov =

Azerbaijani politician (born 1976)

- Mikayıl Cabbarov
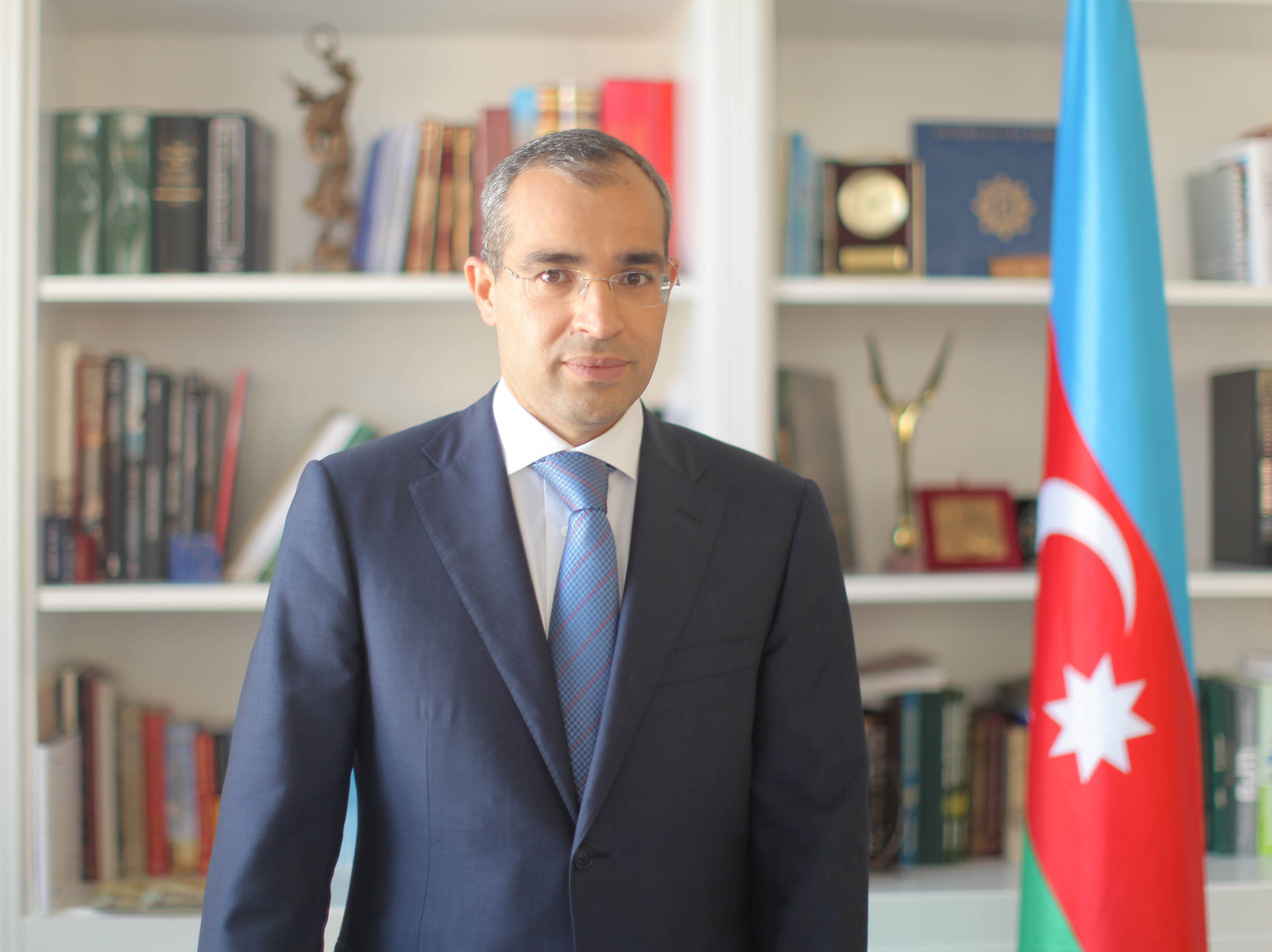
- Official portrait, 2013

Minister of Economу
- Incumbent
- Assumed office 23 October 2019
- President: Ilham Aliyev
- Preceded by: Shahin Mustafayev

Minister of Taxes
- In office 5 December 2017 – 23 October 2019
- Preceded by: Fazil Mammadov
- Succeeded by: Position abolished

Minister of Education
- In office 6 March 2013 – 5 December 2017
- Preceded by: Misir Mardanov
- Succeeded by: Jeyhun Bayramov

Deputy Minister of Economic Development
- In office 20 February 2004 – 6 March 2009

Personal details
- Born: 19 September 1976 (age 50) Baku, Azerbaijan SSR, USSR
- Education: Baku State University; University of the Pacific; Azerbaijan State Economic University

Mikayil Chingiz oghlu Jabbarov (Azerbaijani: Mikayıl Cabbarov Çingiz oğlu born 19 September 1976) is an Azerbaijani politician who is the current Minister of Economу of Azerbaijan (since 23 October 2019)

He was previously Minister of Taxes (2017–2019) and Minister of Education (2013–2017).

== Life ==
Mikayil Jabbarov was born on 19 September 1976 in Baku.

== Education ==
1992–1997 – Studied at Baku State University, graduated from the International Law Department with distinction.

1997–1998 – Obtained an LL.M. degree from McGeorge School of Law, University of the Pacific (Sacramento, California, US).

2004 – Obtained a master's degree in Economics from Azerbaijan State Economic University.

== Career ==
In 1995, Jabbarov began his professional career in the finance industry. After majoring in LL.M. in Sacramento, he became a member of the New York State Bar Association. In 1999, he went on to work as a lawyer in the private sector until 2002.

In 2002, he was appointed to advise the Minister of Economic Development before becoming president of the Azerbaijan Export and Investment Promotion Agency (AZPROMO) in 2003-2004.

On 20 February 2005, Mikayil Jabbarov was appointed Deputy Minister of Economic Development by the Decree of the President of Azerbaijan.

As deputy minister, he was responsible for coordination of activities related to cooperation with international financial institutions and external economic relations, foreign investment policy, legal issues at international arbitrage and corporate governance.

In 2009, he was appointed Director of the Administration of the Icherisheher State Historical-Architectural Reserve by the Decree of the President of Azerbaijan.

19 April 2013 – appointed Minister of Education by the decree of the President of Azerbaijan.

16 June 2017 – appointed as co-chair of Azerbaijan-Israel Joint Commission by the decree of the President of Azerbaijan.

5 December 2017 – appointed as Minister of Taxes by the decree of the President of Azerbaijan.

17 March 2018 – 2 July 2022 - served as co-chair of the Intergovernmental Commission on Bilateral Cooperation between the government of Azerbaijan and the government of the Republic of Lithuania by the Decree of the President of Azerbaijan.

17 March 2018 – 2 March 2020 – served as co-chair of the Joint Commission to promote economic cooperation between the government of Azerbaijan and the government of the Republic of Croatia.

10 October 2018 – promoted to the special rank of 3rd class State Tax Service Adviser by the decree of the President of Azerbaijan.

9 February 2019 – promoted to the special rank of 2nd class State Tax Service Adviser by the decree of the President of Azerbaijan.

23 October 2019 – appointed as Minister of Economy by the decree of the President of Azerbaijan.

4 December 2019 – appointed as co-chair of the Joint Commission between the government of Azerbaijan and the government of the United Arab Emirates on economic, trade and technical cooperation by the decree of the President of Azerbaijan.(in Russian)

2 March 2020 – appointed as co-chair of the Joint Commission between the government of Azerbaijan and the government of the Swiss Federal Council by the decree of the President of Azerbaijan.

2 March 2020 – appointed as deputy co-chair of the Joint Intergovernmental Commission between the Republic of Azerbaijan and the Republic of Georgia on economic cooperation by the decree of the President of Azerbaijan.

4 January 2021 – appointed as a member of the supervisory board of the «Karabakh Revival Fund» by the decree of the President of Azerbaijan.

23 January 2021 – appointed as the chairman of the supervisory board of State Oil Company of the Republic of Azerbaijan by the decree of the President of Azerbaijan.

7 July 2022 - appointed as co-chair of the Joint Intergovernmental Commission on cooperation between the Republic of Azerbaijan and the Republic of Uzbekistan.

Since 28 July 2022 he has been co-chair of the joint intergovernmental commission on economic and humanitarian cooperation between Azerbaijan and Turkmenistan.

24 December 2022 – appointed as co-chair of the Joint Intergovernmental Commission on trade-economic, scientific-technical and cultural cooperation between the Republic of Azerbaijan and the Republic of Tatarstan of the Russian Federation.

27 January 2024 – by decree of the President of Azerbaijan, Alat was appointed the head of the Working Group on the free economic zone.

== Social activity ==
From an early age, Mikayil Jabbarov has been involved in various intellectual games, social activities and extracurricular activities.

From 1994 until 1997, he was president of the "Atashgakh" Intellectual Games Club. From 1996 to 1997, he was Vice-Chairman of the Azerbaijani Youth Organizations Forum.

In 1997, he won the CIS championship in the intellectual play "Brain ring". Later that year, Jabbarov became the first Azerbaijani player in the intellectual television game "What?Where? When?" held in Moscow, participated in the Final of the 1997 Summer Series. He was also a regular participant of the Baku TV club, "What? Where? When?". Winner of the 5th Anniversary Club games.

In 2002, he became world champion of the intellectual game "Brain Ring" and champion of the national championship of "What? Where? When?".

For his contributions to strengthening socio-cultural links between Baku and Tbilisi, Mikayil Jabbarov was granted honorary citizenship in Tbilisi (Georgia) in 2009.

2015–2021 – President of the Azerbaijan Badminton Federation.

2017–2021 – President of the Azerbaijan Fencing Federation.

from 2021 – mentor of the winner of the nationwide competition "Yüksəliş".

from 2021 – President of Azerbaijan Wrestling Federation.

2023 – Mentor of Nargiz Balakishiyeva and Nihad Mansimzade, the winners of the second "Yüksəliş" competition.

2024 – Mentor of Farid Isayev and Asad Gurbanzade, the winners of the second "Yüksəliş" competition.

== Work at the Administration of Icherisheher Reserve ==
Under the leadership of Mikayil Jabbarov during 2009–2013, the Administration of the State Historical-Architectural Reserve Icherisheher developed and implemented a comprehensive master plan for the conservation of the historical center of Baku, and a master development plan for Icherisheher.

In accordance with the plans, the conservation and restoration of historic and cultural monuments of national and international importance, such as the Small Caravanserai, the Mohammed Mosque, the religious and architectural complex Syratagly (Market Square) were carried out.

Most of the walls of the Baku fortress and the 15th tower, destroyed in the early twentieth century, have been restored. Restoration, conservation and research work were conducted on the Maiden Tower, included in the UNESCO's List of Cultural Heritage. An automated system has been introduced in order to regulate and minimize vehicle access to the reserve.

The successful management and restoration of key historical, cultural and architectural monuments led to the expansion of Mikayil Jabbarov's area of responsibility. The Baku Marionette Theatre was transferred to the Administration's control. The State Historical and Ethnographic Reserve Gala and the Historical and Architectural Museum Reserve Shirvanshahs’ Palace Complex were included in the Reserve. By presidential decree a house-museum of world-renowned artist Tahir Salahov was established in the Reserve area.

Mikayil Jabbarov also oversaw the development of the Administration's foreign relations. For instance, the Centre for Traditional Arts Icherisheher was established in cooperation with the Prince of Wales School of Traditional Arts (UK).

In general, Jabbarov's name is associated with initiatives to turn the Reserve into a center for domestic and foreign tourism and to increase the tourism services' level provided within the Reserve.

Mikayil Jabbarov also supervised and successfully implemented the process of excluding Icherisheher from UNESCO's List of World Heritage in Danger. The Administration of Icherisheher has become an example for other countries, whose UNESCO World Heritage sites are in danger.

== Work at the Ministry of Education ==
Mikayil Jabbarov served as the Minister of Education in 2013-2017.

During this period, for the first time, preschool education for 5-year-old children was launched at the state expense at general education schools.

Additionally, since 2015, the process of admission to the first grades in Baku has been completely electronic.

Based on Mikayil Jabbarov's proposals, new rules have been applied to the republican scientific Olympiads since 2015. These rules, which serve to ensure healthy competition, have boosted students' interest in Olympiads, identified talented students, and contributed to increasing confidence in knowledge competitions.

In 2017, the special electronic system Transfer.Edu.Az was put into use to simplify the process of transferring students from one to another higher education institution located in the country and abroad, or from one specialty to another, and to ensure transparency.

During his tenure as the Minister of Education, Mikayil Jabbarov initiated the creation of special teaching SABAH groups, where highly prepared students are given the importance of studying in English. As a result, in 2014, SABAH groups were established in 7 state higher education institutions under the Ministry of Education of Azerbaijan for 34 specialties, and according to the information as of 2024, they continue to operate at 11 state universities.

In 2015, the "Maarifchi" Student Loan Fund was established by the state higher education institutions of Azerbaijan at the initiative of the Ministry of Education in order to create equal opportunities for students from low-income families to receive higher education through the provision of loans.

== Work at the Ministry of Taxes ==
At the conference on "Taxes. Transparency. Development." held in Baku in 2018, Mikayil Jabbarov named his primary objectives as the Minister of Taxes, which were: ensuring the transparency of the Ministry's activities, simplifying export procedures, accessibility of the Ministry's services to citizens of the country, mutual trust between taxpayers and tax authorities, as well as effective oversight of tax revenues.

The minister regularly discussed these objectives, steps to achieve them, as well as information on tax reforms and changes in legislation during meetings with representatives of the diplomatic corps of foreign states, accredited in Azerbaijan, local and foreign business representatives.

The first steps to achieve the objectives stated by the Minister were installation of excise posts at tobacco and alcohol producing enterprises; execution of the twinning program "Support to the Ministry of Taxes in transfer pricing and developing anti-tax avoidance measures"; introduction of online cash registers; implementation of a single procedure for legal entity registration in 20 minutes; number of initiatives to improve transparency in various sectors of the economy, and many more.

To support these and further reforms, Mikayil Jabbarov initiated structural changes in the Ministry, as well as changes to the Tax Code. The amendments to the Tax Code were approved by two Presidential decrees and covered 5 main areas: support for entrepreneurship, combating the shadow economy and tax evasion, expanding the tax base, improving tax administration, and increasing the efficiency of tax incentives. The proposed Tax Ombudsman position was also approved.

As a result of the above measures in 2017–2019, there has been a sharp increase in tax revenues for non-oil industries, revenue transparency and the legalization of the labor market.

== Work at the Ministry of Economy ==
As Minister of Economy, Mikayil Jabbarov attaches great importance to the "whitening" of the economy, encourages the introduction of modern technologies. In May 2020, a VAT refund mechanism for non-cash and cash payments (“ƏDV geri al”) had been introduced, which was recognized as the "Innovative Project of the Year". The Ministry of Economy of Azerbaijan and the Ministry of Economic Development of Russia signed a protocol of intent on cooperation in the field of innovative development and digital economy. A memorandum of understanding was signed in the field of digital trade between Azerbaijan and Turkey. On 24 February 2022, with the participation of Mikayil Jabbarov and the President of the World Economic Forum Børge Brende, the Azerbaijan center of the Fourth Industrial Revolution (4IR) Network of the World Economic Forum was inaugurated.

At the initiative of the Ministry of Economy, comprehensive measures are being implemented aimed at increasing the interest of young people in the field of entrepreneurship. In 2019, the First Forum of Young Entrepreneurs was held in Baku, with the Second Forum taking place in 2021.

One of the priority areas of economic reforms in Azerbaijan is the formation of small and medium-sized businesses as the main driving force of the economy. In order to simplify the access of entrepreneurs to its services, the Agency for the Development of Small and Medium Businesses launched specialized "Houses of Small and Medium Businesses". The Ministry of Economy stimulates entrepreneurship by expanding and simplifying concessional lending at the expense of the Entrepreneurship Development Fund, for which it started an Electronic Loan Platform in 2020.

As part of the development of local industry, a pharmaceutical plant in the Pirallahi Industrial Park and a plant for the production of thermal insulation boards in the Hajigabul Industrial Park were opened, and a memorandum of understanding was signed between the Ministry and “Azerbaijan Coca-Cola Bottlers” LLC on the construction of a new plant. On 24 September 2020, in connection with the issue of bonds, AzerGold CJSC held a “ring a bell” ceremony.

The activities of industrial parks have expanded significantly. In 2021, residents of the Sumgait Chemical Industrial Park produced products worth 2.2 billion manats, while since the start of operation in 2011 until 2021 (including 2021), this figure equaled 4.7 billion manats. Exports of products manufactured in the industrial park exceeded 764 million manats in 2021 only, almost the same number of products were exported for the entire period of 2011–2020.

In 2021, the share of the country's industrial parks in terms of investments in the non-oil sector reached 23.8%, more than 3,200 new jobs were created.

In continuation of work aimed at expansion of the industrial potential of the territories occupied from the Armenian population, the “Araz Valley Economic Zone” Industrial Park in Jabrail district and the “Aghdam Industrial Park” are being created.

In 2020, Azerbaijan approved an action plan to reduce the negative impact of the coronavirus pandemic and to compensate for the damage caused by the pandemic to businesses. The President of Azerbaijan signed a law on the introduction of a special tax regime for the period of the pandemic and a decree on measures to control compliance with the requirements of quarantine regimes, the implementation of which was entrusted to the Ministry of Economy.

Azerbaijan's foreign economic relations are expanding. Mikayil Jabbarov took part in the opening of the Trade and Tourism Representative Offices of Azerbaijan in Israel, and Ukraine's Trading House in Baku. With the participation of the minister, a number of intergovernmental and business agreements were signed: an action plan of the Joint Intergovernmental Commission between Azerbaijan and Turkey, a Framework Document on Sustainable Development Cooperation between Azerbaijan and the UN, a memorandum on technical support for the corporate sector development between Azerbaijan and the European Bank for Reconstruction and Development.

On 20 November 2019 Mikayil Jabbarov was elected as chairman of the Coordinating Council of Heads of Tax Services of the CIS States.

At the same time, the expansion of Azerbaijan's investment activities in other countries continues. Thus, a subsidiary of the State Oil Company of Azerbaijan Republic, SOCAR Türkiye was ranked 8th in the list of "2021 Export Champions" published by the Turkish Exporters Assembly. SOCAR Türkiye's subsidiary, Petkim, was ranked 22nd in the Top 1,000 Exporters list. At the event dedicated to this occasion, Turkish President Recep Tayyip Erdoğan presented SOCAR Türkiye's award to Mikayil Jabbarov, the Chairman of the supervisory board of the company.

After the victory of Azerbaijan in the Second Karabakh War in 2020, the government began to implement activities, such as the restoration of the liberated territories, as well as the presentation of the economic potential of these territories in the international arena. For the first time the economic and investment potential of the liberated territories were demonstrated at the international exhibition in Istanbul. Financial sanctions are lifted in relation to micro-and small businesses from the previously fully and/or partially occupied regions, as well as frontline territories.

Among the heroes of the Second Karabakh War are 146 employees of the Ministry of Economy, who the Minister holds regular meetings with.

In accordance with the order of Azerbaijani President Ilham Aliyev, the "Socio-economic development strategy for 2022-2026 of the Republic of Azerbaijan" has been approved. Commenting on the significance of the document, Minister of Economy Mikayil Jabbarov noted that the working groups created during the preparation of the document were led by the heads of the relevant fields and ministries: "Our main goals are the welfare of the society, integration of Azerbaijan's economy into the global value chain, as well as the intensification of innovative orientation and financial stability of the national economy.”

2021 - At the initiative of Minister of Economy Mikayil Jabbarov, projects were implemented to increase the comprehensive professional training of employees of the Ministry of Economy. For this purpose, the “Path to Success” career development program was launched. The Minister of Economy emphasized the important role of the competition in identifying people with a high level of intelligence, management qualities, knowledge and skills, training new generation managers and establishing the reserve personnel base for managerial positions.

2021-2023 - In order to ensure the revival and economic reintegration of Karabakh, a number of measures are being taken for developing the region’s industrial potential. By the end of 2022, the investments in the industrial zones located in the liberated territories had reached 100 million manats.

According to the information on the social network accounts of Minister of Economy Mikayil Jabbarov, new residents have been registered in the Industrial Park in Aghdam and the “Araz Valley Economic Zone” Industrial Park in Jabrayil district. By October 2023, more than 20 million manats had been invested in the Aghdam Industrial Park in Aghdam and the “Araz Valley Economic Zone” Industrial Park in Jabrayil district.

21 June 2022 - The Ministry of Science and Education and the Ministry of Economy of Azerbaijan launched the “IT-Academy” educational project for those who want to acquire a new profession in the digital field. Minister of Economy Mikayil Jabbarov said that the goal of the IT Academy is to train professionals in the field of information technology, facilitate the development of the country's IT market, as well as accelerate digitalization in the education system. The implementation of the project will create new opportunities for the promotion of innovative activities among young people, the training of information technology specialists, engineers, inventors and scientists and the development of the competitive human capital.

31 October 2022 - Azerbaijan Trade House was opened in Qatar with the participation of Minister of Economy Mikayil Jabbarov.

24 December 2022 - A Memorandum of Understanding on the establishment of the Azerbaijan-Uzbekistan Investment Fund was signed between the Ministry of Economy of Azerbaijan and the Ministry of Investment and Foreign Trade of Uzbekistan to strengthen the economic relations with the Turkic-speaking countries. The document was signed by Minister of Economy Mikayil Jabbarov and Deputy Prime Minister of the Republic of Uzbekistan, Minister of Investment and Foreign Trade Jamshid Khodjaev.

21 January 2023 - within the framework of the Davos Economic Forum, Minister of Economy Mikayil Jabbarov held a discussion with Chief Executive Officer of the educational platform ""Coursera" Jeff Maggioncalda on exploring the possibilities of promoting the digital ecosystem in Azerbaijan.

7 February 2023 - The “IT Hub Azerbaijan” project was launched with the joint cooperation of the Center for Analysis and Coordination of the Fourth Industrial Revolution (4SIM), the European Bank for Reconstruction and Development (EBRD) and the “StrategEast” enterprise. Within the framework of the project, at the initial stage, in the regions of Azerbaijan, including the cities of Ganja, Sumgayit, Lankaran, Mingachevir, Shirvan and in the Nakhchivan Autonomous Republic, young people in the age category of 19-30 will participate in the IT training free of charge, and the selected candidates from among the young people, who successfully complete the program, will be provided with jobs in foreign companies while staying in our country.

21 April 2023 – The “4SI Academy” pilot project began. As part of the project, within 1 year, about 10,000 people, who wanted to improve their knowledge and skills in the field of technologies of the Fourth Industrial Revolution, had the opportunity to join more than 700 courses provided by “Coursera” free of charge. Minister of Economy Mikayil Jabbarov stressed that the project will contribute to the development of knowledge and skills in the field of technologies of the Fourth Industrial Revolution and the training of qualified personnel in this field on the labor market.

5 May 2023 - On the occasion of the 100th anniversary of National Leader Heydar Aliyev’s birth, the encyclopedic commemorative carpet composition “The Architect of the State. The Encyclopedia of a Lifetime” was presented with the organization of the Ministry of Economy and “Azerkhalcha” OJSC. Addressing the event, Minister of Economy Mikayil Jabbarov underscored that the 100th anniversary of Heydar Aliyev’s birth, the founder of the modern Azerbaijan state, the national leader, is being celebrated by our people. “The Architect of the State. The Encyclopedia of a Lifetime” reflects the legacy and activity of the Great Leader in loops.

1 June 2023 – An agreement on tripartite cooperation was signed between “Baku Shipyard” LLC, a resident of the Garadagh Industrial Park, “Baku International Sea Trade Port” CJSC and “Damen Shipyards Gorinchem B.V.” company of the Netherlands.

8 August 2023 - As the continuation of stimulating the manufacturing of competitive non-oil goods, creating import-substituting production areas and expanding exports, the foundation of a brewing barley processing plant was laid in Imishli.

3 September 2023 - Azerbaijan Trade House was opened in Beijing. Minister of Economy Mikayil Jabbarov, who participated in the event, highlighted that Azerbaijan’s 4th trading house in China will play the role of a dynamic platform for trade and cultural exchange.

20–24 November 2023 - SPECA (UN Special Program for the Economies of Central Asian Countries) Week was held in Baku. At the 18th session of the Governing Council held as part of the SPECA Week, Minister of Economy Mikayil Jabbarov drew attention to the importance of SPECA and noted that the shared values, rich resources, transport, logistics and alternative energy potential of the SPECA countries create a fertile ground for mutually beneficial economic and trade cooperation.

As part of the SPECA Week, the exhibition called “SPECA Countries Exhibition: Regional Cooperation for Sustainable Development” and the Economic Forum on “Transformation of the SPECA region into a global communication hub” were held at the special initiative of Azerbaijan.

28 November 2023 - the opening of SOCAR’s representative office in Turkmenistan was held in Ashgabat with the participation of Chairman of the Supervisory Board of the State Oil Company of the Republic of Azerbaijan (SOCAR), Minister of Economy Mikayil Jabbarov.

On 7 December 2023, the foundation of the pharmaceutical production plant was laid in the Pirallahi Industrial Park. Minister of Economy Mikayil Jabbarov, who participated in the ceremony, said that the activity of the enterprise is a step aimed at the development of the drug production sector; the drugs to be produced are intended both for meeting the domestic demand of the country and for export.

In Azerbaijan, a number of measures have been implemented for the development of the non-oil sector through the promotion of industrialization. Minister of Economy Mikayil Jabbarov noted that the development and diversification of the industry with innovative methods play an important role in economic diversification.

Adequately to the social and economic development priorities of Azerbaijan, the Ministry of Economy is implementing a number of important projects to ensure the transition to a “green economy” by effectively utilizing the potential of renewable energy sources. At the meetings held in 2023 between Minister of Economy Mikayil Jabbarov and Chairman of the Board of Directors of ACWA Power company of the Kingdom of Saudi Arabia Muhammad Abdullah Rashid Abunayyan, attracting investors to the energy sector of Azerbaijan, boosting the efficiency of renewable energy and increasing the share of alternative energy sources in the energy sector were highlighted as the important issues in the economic development strategy of our country. In this regard, importance is placed on the cooperation with ACWA Power, one of the leading companies in the sector of renewable energy sources.

In 2023, three investment agreements on “green energy” projects with a total capacity of 1000 MW were signed between the Government of Azerbaijan and the UAE’s “Masdar” company. On behalf of the Government of Azerbaijan, Minister of Energy Parviz Shahbazov, Minister of Economy Mikayil Jabbarov and Chief Executive Officer of “Masdar” company Muhammad Jamil Al-Ramahi signed the contracts.

As a result of the trilateral meeting between the relevant ministers of Azerbaijan, Uzbekistan and Kazakhstan, a Joint Communiqué was adopted, which envisages issues of cooperation in the field of energy exchange focusing on renewable energy sources, including the export of "green" energy. The document was signed by Minister of Economy of Azerbaijan Mikayil Jabbarov, Minister of Energy Parviz Shahbazov, Minister of Energy of Uzbekistan Zhurabek Mirzamahmudov, Minister of Investment, Industry and Trade Laziz Kudratov, Minister of Energy of Kazakhstan Almasadam Satkaliyev.

In 2024, a Memorandum of Understanding on the Preparation of the Country Cooperation Framework was signed between the Islamic Development Bank and the Ministry of Economy. The document was signed by Minister of Economy Mikayil Jabbarov and President of the Islamic Development Bank Group Muhammad Sulaiman Al Jasser. Minister of Economy Mikayil Jabbarov noted that the document will contribute to strengthening the cooperation between the parties.

A number of events were held by the Ministry of Economy at the 29th meeting of the Conference of the Parties (COP) to the UN Framework Convention on Climate Change (UNFCCC) held in Baku in November 2024. Valuable discussions were held on encouraging the transition to a green economy, promoting the sustainable business models contributing to climate action, accelerating the transformation to carbonless working principles, as well as boosting the utilization of renewable energy; several documents were signed. The SPECA Climate and Innovation Dialogue and the SPECA Multilateral Trust Fund were introduced as part of COP29. Minister of Economy Mikayil Jabbarov stressed that the SPECA Climate and Innovation Dialogue will be a unified platform for global climate management: “The Fund will serve as a swift mechanism for solving common problems, such as economic integration and ongoing development.”

The global Green Growth Portal, developed within the framework of the cooperation between the Ministry of Economy and Harvard University’s Growth Lab and introduced at COP29, has been put into operation. Minister of Economy Mikayil Jabbarov emphasized that the Green Growth Portal will help refine the green transition strategies and contribute to reducing global emissions.

The first industrial explosives production plant has started fully operating in Ganja. Minister of Economy Mikayil Jabbarov noted that the first industrial explosives production plant, which began to fully operate in Ganja in 2024, is a successful business model of the public-private partnership, and this project is of great significance in terms of creating new jobs and modern production areas and reducing import dependency.

The Joint Participation Agreement has been signed among bp, SOCAR Green and the Azerbaijan Investment Company on the construction of the 240 MW Shafag Solar Power Plant in Jabrayil. Minister of Economy Mikayil Jabbarov highlighted that the Joint Participation Agreement, signed among bp, SOCAR Green and the Azerbaijan Investment Company in 2024 in Jabrayil, will contribute to driving foreign direct investments, supporting Azerbaijan’s green transition objectives, the economic development of Jabrayil district and enhancing its energy supply, as well as reducing carbon emissions in the Caspian Sea and at the Sangachal terminal.

As a result of the reforms, launched in Azerbaijan’s labor market in 2019, the number of concluded employment contracts has increased. Commenting on the 79% increase in new employment contracts in the non-oil sector as a result of the labor market reforms (application of concessions and fiscal incentives) launched in 2019, Minister of Economy Mikayil Jabbarov noted that the quality change in the labor market is the outcome of the economic growth, launch of new enterprises and the projects implemented within the framework of the investment promotion and the incentive-based tax policy. Harvard University’s Growth Lab has commended the reforms implemented in Azerbaijan’s labor market. It has been noted that it is a good example of incentives being efficient for the legalization of businesses.

July 8, 2026 – Appointed as the Co-Chair of the Joint Commission on Economic, Scientific-Technical and Cultural Cooperation between the Government of the Republic of Azerbaijan and the Government of the Czech Republic.

== Controversies ==
2013–2017 – Comprehensive measures were taken to prevent bribery and corruption in the educational system, but they were not assessed as fully successful. Experts called for more radical measures to be taken, no real proposals were put forward, though.

2016 – The idea that "it is not right to assess the students studying within a new educational system through the tests" was met with criticism. This idea was misrepresented to the public as a suggestion to cancel the test exams, while, in fact, the idea implied the application of new tools to assess students’ knowledge. With this regard, the State Examination Center released a statement with a similar message, confirming that the new idea does not mean a cancellation of the tests as such.

== See also ==
- Cabinet of Azerbaijan
- Education in Azerbaijan

== Social networks ==
Mikayil Jabbarov on Facebook

Mikayil Jabbarov on X
