= State Committee for Securities (Azerbaijan) =

State Committee for Securities of Azerbaijan Republic
- Azerbaijani: Azərbaycan Respublikası Qiymətli Kağızlar üzrə Dövlət Komitəsi
- Coat of Arms of Azerbaijan

Agency overview
- Formed: November 19, 2008
- Headquarters: 19 Bulbul Avenue, Baku, Azerbaijan Republic 1000
- Agency executive: Rufat Aslanli, Chairman of State Committee for Securities
- Child agency: The National Depository Center of Azerbaijan Republic
- Website: www.scs.gov.az

The State Committee for Securities of Azerbaijan Republic (Azerbaijani: Azərbaycan Respublikası Qiymətli Kağızlar üzrə Dövlət Komitəsi) is a governmental agency within the Cabinet of Azerbaijan in charge of regulation of activities in securities market, protecting rights and interests of investors, shareholders and other owners of securities in Azerbaijan Republic. The committee is headed by Rufat Aslanli.

== History ==
Establishment of securities market in Azerbaijan dates back to the beginning of the 20th century. In the first decades of the century, banks in Baku issued promissory notes and interest bearing securities which were used during sale transactions and as a form of IOUs. Usage of promissory notes was widely developed during the existence of Azerbaijan Democratic Republic. The first shares in the country were issued by the Baku Trade Bank. Among the main shareholders of the bank were the chairman of board of directors, Haji Zeynalabdin Taghiyev, Shamsi Asadullayev, Musa Naghiyev, Murtuza Mukhtarov and others. After establishment of Soviet rule in Azerbaijan, the usage of notes was banned. With restoration of independence of Azerbaijan, establishment of securities market was one of the main priorities of the government. On July 26, 1999 Presidential Decree on "On Providing the Activity of State Committee for Securities under the auspices of the President of Azerbaijan Republic" formally established an agency under the office of the President of Azerbaijan overseeing organized securities market in the country. Since the inception, the committee has undertaken several important reforms on transparency of processing the security markets, adopted acts restricting potential risks in the markets to the minimal level, protecting rights of investors to comply with international standards. On February 15, 2000 the committee supported establishment of Baku Stock Exchange (BSE). Baku Stock Exchange is made up from 18 big banks and financial institutions, with Istanbul Stock Exchange being among them. The first trading operation at the stock exchange was carried out on September 1, 2000. On November 19, 2008 Presidential Decree No. 52 established State Committee for Securities.

== See also ==
- Cabinet of Azerbaijan
- Baku Stock Exchange
- Economy of Azerbaijan
