= International Carpet Festival =

Annual festival in Baku, Azerbaijan

The International Carpet Festival is an annual festival held in Baku, Azerbaijan, centered around the tradition of Azerbaijani carpet weaving. The festival takes place in Icherisheher (Old City) and is organized by the Administration of the State Historical-Architectural Reserve "Icherisheher" and Azerkhalcha OJSC, with support from the Ministry of Economy of the Republic of Azerbaijan and the Azerbaijan Export and Investment Promotion Agency (AZPROMO).

== History ==
The inaugural National Carpet Festival was held on May 4–5, 2024. The festival was expanded to an international level in 2025.

== Festival activities ==
The International Carpet Festival features various activities, including:

- Exhibitions: Showcasing ancient, modern, and designer carpets.
- Masterclasses: Sessions on carpet weaving techniques.
- Interactive Performances: Theatrical and musical presentations related to carpet culture.
- Educational Seminars: Discussions on the history and techniques of carpet weaving.
- International Forum: A platform for global experts to discuss the future of carpet weaving.

The festival coincides with Carpet Weaver's Day, established by a decree from President Ilham Aliyev on May 5, 2016, to honor Azerbaijani carpet artisans.

== Cultural significance ==
Azerbaijani carpet weaving is recognized as an Intangible Cultural Heritage of Humanity by UNESCO. The International Carpet Festival is an event focused on the exhibition of traditional Azerbaijani carpet weaving, providing a venue for artisans to present their work and for visitors to engage with aspects of the country's cultural heritage.
