= Aslanli =

Aslanli may refer to:

== People ==
- Rufat Aslanli (born 1970), Azerbaijani official
- Ibrahim Aslanli (born 1996), Azerbaijani footballer

== Other uses ==
- Aslanlı, Kızıltepe, neighborhood in Turkey
