= Small and Medium Business Development Agency of Azerbaijan (KOBİA) =

Azerbaijani government agency

Small and Medium Business Development Agency (KOBİA) of the Republic of Azerbaijan

Agency overview
- Formed: 28 December 2017
- Jurisdiction: Ministry of Economy of the Republic of Azerbaijan
- Agency executives: Orkhan Mammadov, Chairman of the Board; Samir Humbatov, First Deputy Chairman; Rufat Atakishiev, Deputy chair; Emil Huseynli, Deputy chair
- Website: www.smb.gov.az

Small and Medium Business Development Agency of the Republic of Azerbaijan is a public legal entity that promotes the growth of micro, small, and medium-sized businesses (SMBs) in Azerbaijan. It offers various forms of assistance and services to entrepreneurs while also overseeing and managing public services related to this sector, enhancing the role of SMBs in economic development.

KOBİA provides supports in areas such as improvement of public services provided to the private sector, protection of SMBs' interests, development of SMBs' access to knowledge, innovation, access to sales markets and financial resources.

Within the framework of the state support mechanisms and its own services the support provided by the KOBİA ranges from business establishment to business development, acting as a bridge between state authorities and entrepreneurs.

== History ==
Small and Medium Business Enterprises Development Agency of the Republic of Azerbaijan was established by the Presidential Decree of Azerbaijan on December 28, 2017.

The Agency was renamed to the Small and Medium Business Development Agency (KOBİA) of the Republic of Azerbaijan by a presidential decree dated June 26, 2018, which has also adopted the Charter and the structure of the Agency.

The Small and Medium Business Development Agency of the Republic of Azerbaijan (KOBİA) joins the SME Finance Forum in 2012 as the newest member of the global membership network.

The Azerbaijan Halal Business and Tourism Forum (AZHAB Forum) was held for the first time in Baku on October 8–9, 2024. The 2nd Azerbaijan Halal Business Forum (AZHAB Forum) held in Baku on October 7–8, 2025 under the theme “Halal Industry as a Source of Resilience in a Rapidly Changing World” and was organized with the support of the Ministry of Economy of the Republic of Azerbaijan and the Small and Medium Business Development Agency (KOBIA).

== Supervisory Council ==
The Agency is overseen by two bodies: the Supervisory Board and the Management Board. The Supervisory Board, made up of seven members, is responsible for managing the Agency’s activities.

The Minister of Economy leads the Agency’s Supervisory Board. Members include Deputy Ministers of Finance, Labor and Social Protection, and Agriculture; the Deputy Chairman of the State Agency for Public Services and Social Innovations; the Deputy Chief of the State Tax Service; and the President of the National Confederation of Entrepreneurs (Employers).

The supervisory Board acts on voluntary (pro bono) basis and is independent in decision-making.

== Management Board ==
The Agency’s Management Board has five members and is led by a Chairman. The Minister of Economy, with the President’s approval, appoints and dismisses the Chairman. The Chairman’s first deputy and three other deputies are also appointed and dismissed in agreement with the Minister of Economy. The deputies assist in carrying out the Board’s duties.

== Structure ==
On June 26, 2018, the President of Azerbaijan, Ilham Aliyev, approved the Agency’s organizational structure by decree:

- Administration of the Small and Medium Business Development Agency of the Republic of Azerbaijan;

- Small and medium business houses;

- Small and medium business Development Centers;

- Public-Private Partnership Development Center;

- Small and medium business development funds.
