= State Agency for Antimonopoly and Consumer Market Control =

Azerbaijani state body

- Antiinhisar və İstehlak Bazarına Nəzarət Dövlət Agentliyi

Agency overview
- Formed: 1992
- Agency executive: Elnur Baghirov, chairman
- Website: https://competition.gov.az/az

State Agency for Antimonopoly and Consumer Market Control under the President of the Republic of Azerbaijan — is a state body responsible for strengthening business competition, as well as preventing and reducing anti-competitive activities. It additionally guarantees government oversight of public purchasing, technical standards, quality assurance, and safeguarding consumer rights.

== History ==
In Azerbaijan, the establishment of the State Committee for Antimonopoly Policy and Entrepreneurial Support was mandated by Presidential Decree No. 3 on June 23, 1992. The committee's regulations were formally endorsed in August 1992.

In 2001, the Committee became part of the Ministry of Economic Development and was renamed as the Department of Antimonopoly Policy.

The Antimonopoly State Service was established on December 28, 2006, within the Ministry of Economic Development, and it was tasked with overseeing consumer market regulations.

In 2009, the Antimonopoly Policy and Consumer Rights Protection State Service were established, assuming responsibilities for antimonopoly actions, unfair competition, natural monopolies, advertising, and overseeing consumer market regulations.

On April 20, 2018, the Antimonopoly and Consumer Market Control State Agency was established, which was integrated into the framework of the Ministry of Economy. Additionally, the State Committee on Standardization, Metrology, and Patents was placed under the jurisdiction of the Agency.

On October 23, 2019, a Presidential decree was made to reinstate the agency's status as a public service. Subsequently, on December 19, 2019, the Antimonopoly and Consumer Market Control State Service was reintegrated into the Ministry of Economy.

When the State Procurement Agency of Azerbaijan, the former central executive authority which implemented state policy in the field of procurement of goods (works and services) at the expense of state funds of Azerbaijan, was disbanded on January 15, 2016, its responsibilities, functions, and assets were transferred to the State Service.

The Statute of the State Service was ratified through the Presidential Decree of Azerbaijan on May 12, 2020.

On August 27, 2024, the State Service for Antimonopoly and Consumer Market Control under the Ministry of Economy of the Azerbaijan Republic was reorganized into the State Agency for Antimonopoly and Consumer Market Control under the President of the Republic of Azerbaijan. On February 12, 2025, by the relevant decree of the President of Azerbaijan, Elnur Baghirov was appointed as the head of the agency.

== Overview ==
As outlined in the State Service's Statute, the primary functions of the State Service include:

- Antitrust Regulations
- Regulatory oversight over Natural Monopolies
- Unfair Competition
- Control over Advertising Activity
- Consumer Market Control and Consumer Rights Protection
- Public Procurement
- Quality Infrastructure (metrology, standardization, technical regulation, accreditation, conformity assessment)

The management of the service is overseen by the chief who is appointed and removed by the President of the Republic of Azerbaijan.

Mammad Abbasbayli was appointed Head of the State Service according to the Presidential Order dated December 23, 2021.

The State Service has 14 regional divisions, including Baku city division.

== Subordinate Institutions ==
Subsidiary organizations do not fall within the framework of the State Service. These include the Azerbaijan Institute of Standardization, which is responsible for the development, establishment, and implementation of standards.

The Azerbaijan Metrology Institute conducts the calibration of measuring devices, issues calibration certificates, and grants authorization for applying calibration marks.

Azerbaijan Accreditation Center is responsible for executing accreditation procedures within the field of conformity assessment.

Consumer Goods Expertise Center conducts examinations to ascertain the origin of goods.

== International Relations ==
The State Service collaborates with international organizations to exchange expertise regarding regulations, application, and various other aspects of its operations. These organizations include the CIS, GUAM, the European Accreditation Organization, the International Laboratory Accreditation Cooperation (ILAC), the International Organization for Standardization (ISO), the European Committee for Standardization (CEN), the International Organization of Legal Metrology (OIML), the Interstate Council for Standardization, Metrology and Certification of the CIS (IGC), the Standards and Metrology Institute for Islamic Countries (SMIIC), among others. Additionally, in 2006, due to the efforts of the State Service, Azerbaijan was elected as a member of the Advisory Group of the International Consumer Protection and Enforcement Network (ICPEN).

== See also ==
- Ministry of Economy (Azerbaijan)
- International Competition Network
