= Heydar Babayev =

Azerbaijani politician

- Heydər Babayev

Minister of Economic Development
- In office October 19, 2005 – October 31, 2008
- President: Ilham Aliyev
- Preceded by: Farhad Aliyev
- Succeeded by: Shahin Mustafayev

Chairman of State Committee for Securities (under auspices of the President of Azerbaijan)
- In office July 26, 1999 – October 19, 2005
- Preceded by: office established
- Succeeded by: Rufat Aslanli

Personal details
- Born: 1957 (age 68–69) Baku, Azerbaijan

Heydar Babayev Aydin oghlu (Azerbaijani: Heydər Babayev Aydın oğlu; born 1957) was an Azerbaijani politician serving as the Chairman of State Committee for Securities under auspices of the President of Azerbaijan and Minister of Economic Development.

== Early life ==
Babayev was born in Baku, Azerbaijan. In 1980, he graduated from the International Economic Relations department at Taras Shevchenko National University of Kyiv in Ukraine. He started his career working as an inspector at the Chamber of Commerce of Azerbaijan Republic. In 1981, he was assigned to work as foreign exchange inspector and later assistant manager of economy department at the USSR Foreign Economic Relations Bank. After the collapse of Soviet Union, he was employed as the representative of Xariciiqtisadibank in Turkey. In 1997, he was elected Vice President of Mostbank and was assigned to lead its chapter in Great Britain.

== Political career ==
With establishment of State Committee for Securities under auspices of the president of Azerbaijan Republic on July 26, 1999 he was appointed its chairman by President Heydar Aliyev (Later on, the agency was re-established as an independent government committee on November 19, 2008). On October 19, 2005 Babayev was appointed Minister of Economic Development after the previous minister Farhad Aliyev was sacked by President Ilham Aliyev in the run-up to parliamentary election of 2005. On October 30, 2008 Babayev was removed from his post being replaced by Shahin Mustafayev in the government reshuffle.

== See also ==
- Cabinet of Azerbaijan
- Economy of Azerbaijan
