= Fazil Mammadov =

Azerbaijani politician (1964–2022)

Fazil Mammadov Fazil Məmmədov
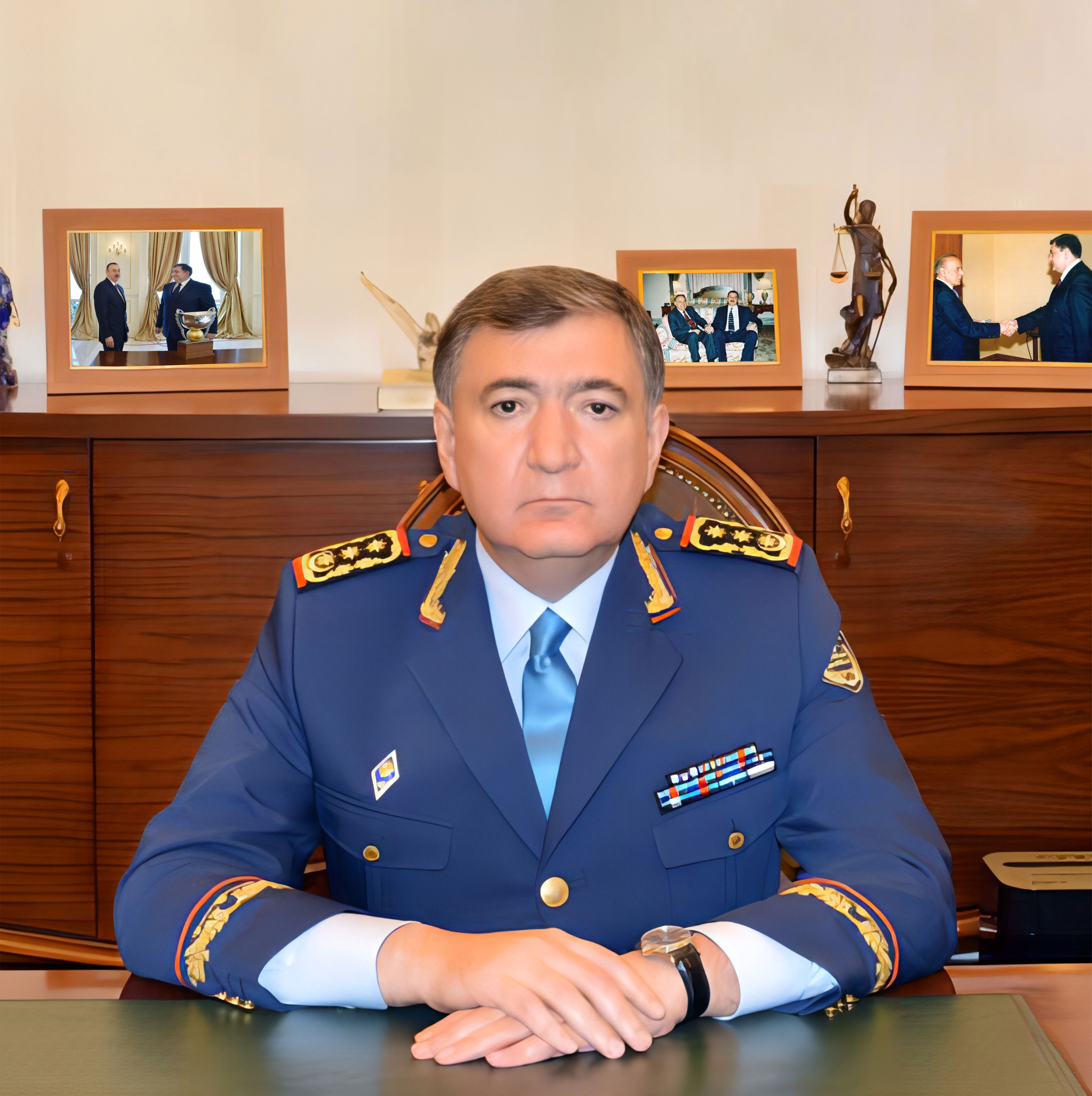
- Fazil Mammadov in his office

Minister of Taxes of Azerbaijan Republic
- In office 11 February 2000 – 2017
- President: Heydar Aliyev, Ilham Aliyev
- Preceded by: office established
- Succeeded by: Mikayil Jabbarov

Personal details
- Born: 28 March 1964 Shamkir, Azerbaijan SSR, Soviet Union
- Died: 4 November 2022 (aged 58) Istanbul, Turkey
- Children: 3

Military service
- Years of service: 1985–1987
- Rank: Colonel

Fazil Mammadov Asad oglu (Azerbaijani: Fazil Məmmədov Əsəd oğlu; 28 March 1964 – 4 November 2022) the first Minister of Taxes of the Republic of Azerbaijan (2000–2017), first class adviser of the state tax service, president of the Azerbaijan Field Hockey Federation (2001–2015), president of the Azerbaijan Wrestling Federation (2007–2018), president of the Azerbaijan Cycling Federation (2011– 2021).

== Biography ==
Fazil Asad oghlu Mammadov was born in the family of the civil servant in the region of Shamakhi on 28 March 1964. He graduated from secondary school number 5 named after Jamo Jabraylbeyli in the region of Shamakhi in 1980 with exemplary behavior and excellent grades. He studied “Finance and credit” at Azerbaijan National Institute of Economics named after Dadash Bunyadzade and graduated from this University in 1985.

He was in the military service during the years of 1985-1987 in Ukraine. He was rewarded with a badge “For distinction in military service”.

He is a veteran of the Chernobyl disaster. He took an active part as a volunteer in the elimination of the consequences of the terrible accident at the Chernobyl Nuclear Power Plant near Kiev in 1986. He was awarded a medal of “Chernobyl Cross: Courageous, Honorable, Humanist” by the Ukrainian Chernobyl Union in recognition of extreme bravery and devotion to duty.

On November 4, 2022, he died of kidney failure in the hospital where he was treated in Istanbul, Turkey. He was buried in Yasamal cemetery on November 5, 2022.

He was married and had 3 children.

== Political career ==
In 1987-1989, he worked as an economist at the Industrial-Construction Bank, director of a cashier and as an economist in the Operations Department of Baku Industrial-Construction Bank. From 1989 till 1993, he was a teacher and head of department at Financial-Credit college. He was elected as a chairman of the Board of Directors of the Commercial Bank “Unsal” in 1993. He later served as Head of Shamkhir branch of Agrarian Industrial Bank in 1994. During 1995-1999, he served as a deputy head and head of General Directorate of Finance - Tariff and Currency Control of the State Customs Committee. He also served as a deputy chairman of the Customs Committee in charge of Finance-Tariff and Currency Control.

He was appointed as Head of the Chief State Tax Inspectorate by the decree of President Heydar Aliyev of the Republic of Azerbaijan on 20 June 1999. Ministry of Taxes of the Republic of Azerbaijan was established by the decree of President Heydar Aliyev of the Republic of Azerbaijan on 11 February 2000, and Fazil Asad oghlu Mammadov was appointed as the first Minister of Taxes of the Republic of Azerbaijan. He was in this office until 5 December 2017.

A special rank of 1st grade State Counselor for tax service was conferred to him by order of the President Ilham Aliyev of the Republic of Azerbaijan on 9 February 2015.

He was rewarded with “Shohrat Order” for his high achievements during the 1st European Games and for his great contribution to the development of Azerbaijani sports on 29 June 2015.

On January 15, 2016, he was awarded the military rank of reserve colonel by order of the Minister of Defense.

He was the President of the Azerbaijan Field Hockey Federation in 2001-2015.

He was the President of Azerbaijan Wrestling Federation during the years of 2007-2018.

He was the President of Azerbaijan Cycling Federation in 2011-2021.

== Honors and awards ==
- He was rewarded with “Jubilee Medal” for his service in the Trade Union movement by the Executive Committee of the Confederation of Trade Unions of Azerbaijan on 18 November 2005.
- He was rewarded with the badge “For strengthening of customs cooperation” by the State Customs Committee of the Republic of Azerbaijan on 30 January 2006.
- He was rewarded with the “90th anniversary of Azerbaijan Police” jubilee medal by the Ministry of Internal Affairs of the Republic of Azerbaijan on 30 June 2008.
- He was rewarded with jubilee memorial medal of “90th anniversary of the Prosecutor’s Office of the Republic of Azerbaijan” by the Prosecutor’s Office of the Republic of Azerbaijan on 26 September 2008.
- He was rewarded with the medal of “90th Anniversary Memorial Medal of Azerbaijan Judiciary” by Ministry of Justice of Azerbaijan Republic on 20 November 2008.
- He was rewarded with the jubilee medal of “90th anniversary of the national security bodies of the Republic of Azerbaijan (1919-2009)” by Ministry of National Security of the Republic of Azerbaijan on 26 March 2009.
- He was rewarded with the jubilee medal of “90th anniversary of Azerbaijan Border Guard (1919-2009)” by the State Border Service of the Republic of Azerbaijan on 17 August 2009.
- He was rewarded with the memorial medal of “Contract of the Century - 15 years” by SOCAR for services in the development of the oil and gas industry in the Republic of Azerbaijan on 20 September 2009.
- He was rewarded with the jubilee medal of “10th anniversary of the Ministry of Taxes of the Republic of Azerbaijan (2000-2010)” by the Ministry of Taxes of the Republic of Azerbaijan on 11 February 2010.
- He was rewarded with the jubilee medal of “20th anniversary of the State Customs Committee of the Republic of Azerbaijan (1992-2012)” by the State Customs Committee of the Republic of Azerbaijan on 26 January 2012.
- He was rewarded with the anniversary badge of “ACTU-20” by the Confederation of Trade Unions of Azerbaijan on 8 February 2013.
- He was rewarded with the jubilee medal of the “95th Anniversary of Azerbaijan Police (1918-2013)” by the Ministry of Internal Affairs of the Republic of Azerbaijan on 25 June 2013.
- He was rewarded with the jubilee medal of the “95th anniversary of the national security bodies of the Republic of Azerbaijan (1919-2014)” by the Ministry of National Security of the Republic of Azerbaijan on 14 March 2014.
- He was rewarded with the jubilee medal of “25th anniversary of the State Customs Committee of the Republic of Azerbaijan (1992-2017)” by the State Customs Committee of the Republic of Azerbaijan on 12 January 2017.
- He was rewarded with the jubilee medal of “10th anniversary of the State Migration Service of the Republic of Azerbaijan (2007-2017)” by the State Migration Service of the Republic of Azerbaijan on 17 March 2017.
- He was rewarded with the order of 4th degree of “St. George the Victorious with a Golden Sword” by the State Tax Administration of Ukraine on 6 September 2002.
- He was rewarded with the badge of “Honorary Name of STA of Ukraine” by the State Tax Administration of Ukraine on 1 November 2003.
- He was rewarded with the order of “Chernobyl Cross: “Courageous, Honorable, Humanist” by the Ukrainian Chernobyl Union with VGO serialized on 26 January 2005.
- He was rewarded with the badge of “For assistance to tax authorities” by State Tax Administration of Ukraine on 13 November 2008.
- He was awarded by the International Wrestling Federation for his contribution to the development of world wrestling in 2008.
- He was awarded with “65-year Order of Victory” by Public Awards Committee of the Russian Federation on 12 April 2010.
- He was awarded the “Shohrat Order” by the President of the Republic of Azerbaijan, Ilham Aliyev, for his high achievements in the 1st European Games and his great services in the development of Azerbaijani sports on 29 June 2015.
- He was awarded with “Decree of Honor” by the Executive Committee of the CIS countries for his services in the directions of strengthening and development of tax services in the CIS countries on 20 September 2016.
- He was awarded with the “Jubilee Medal of the Revenue Committee” by the State Revenue Committee of the Ministry of Finance of Kazakhstan on 7 October 2016.
- He was awarded with a medal by the Baku Nobel Heritage Foundation.

== See also ==
- Cabinet of Azerbaijan
