= Aghdam Industrial Park =

Industrial park in Aghdam District, Azerbaijan

- Interactive map of Aghdam Industrial Park
- Location: Aghdam District, Azerbaijan
- Opening date: 28 May 2021
- Manager: Economic Zones Development Agency
- Owner: Government of Azerbaijan
- Size: 190 ha (470 acres)

Aghdam Industrial Park (Azerbaijani: Ağdam Sənaye Parkı) is an industrial park in the Aghdam District of Azerbaijan. Established by presidential decree on 28 May 2021, it covers about 190 hectares near the city of Aghdam.

The park is administered by the Economic Zones Development Agency under Ministry of Economy and was created to support industrial development and job creation as part of the economic reintegration and reconstruction of the district.

== History and development ==
Aghdam Industrial Park was created by Decree No. 1347 of 28 May 2021, which defined the park as a dedicated territory with the infrastructure and management structure required for manufacturing, processing (including recycling), sales, and related services. The same decree assigned management and development of the park to the Economic Zones Development Agency and provided initial public funding for organisational and infrastructure work.

In February 2022, President Ilham Aliyev visited the park and laid the foundation stones for two resident projects. In September 2024, he participated in the opening of several new factories.

== Industrial profile ==
Early works included preparing the site and establishing basic facilities for resident companies and staff. Publicly described measures included the installation of water supply via a sub-artesian well, a 10 kV power line and transformer substation, and site lighting (including solar-powered elements). The decree establishing the park also envisaged site preparation and safety measures as part of phased development, including clearance of war-related hazards before full-scale construction and operations.

From 2024 to 2025, public reports described the park as hosting more than 30 registered business entities (residents and non-residents), with an overall investment portfolio estimated in the range of about 250–270 million manats and with multiple projects in operation and under construction.

Factories launched or announced at the park include plants producing electrical distribution equipment and prefabricated electrical substations, automation and telemechanics systems, wallpaper, ventilation and firefighting equipment, metal products, roofing and façade systems, and footwear, among other construction-oriented outputs. Azerbaijani media and official releases also noted export activity from some resident manufacturers, including exports of locally produced wallpaper to Georgia.

Resident companies in Aghdam Industrial Park are eligible for Azerbaijan's industrial-park incentive regime, including multi-year exemptions from property and land taxes and profit/income tax, as well as VAT and customs exemptions for imported equipment and technology used for production purposes.

== See also ==
- Economy of Azerbaijan
