= Jujevan =

Village in Tavush, Armenia

Jujevan Ջուջևան
- Location within Armenia Location within Tavush
- Coordinates: 41°07′56″N 45°00′40″E
- Country: Armenia
- Province: Tavush
- Municipality: Noyemberyan
- Founded: 1874

Population (2011)
  - Total: 514
- Time zone: UTC+4 (AMT)

Jujevan (Armenian: Ջուջևան) is a village in the Noyemberyan Municipality of the Tavush Province of Armenia.

== History ==
The village was founded in 1874, and is the site of the Jujevank Monastery dating from the 19th century and a 12th/13th-century chapel. Poploz-Gash, an Early Iron Age cyclopean fort and the Jaghatsategh settlement from the Early Bronze Age are also located nearby.

== Demographics ==
The village had 407 inhabitants in 2000, and 514 inhabitants in 2011.

== Notable people ==
- Shahin Mustafayev, Azerbaijani politician, First Deputy Prime Minister and former Minister of Economic Development of the Republic of Azerbaijan
