= Economic history of Azerbaijan =

The economic history of Azerbaijan covers the development of the country's economy from its incorporation into the Russian Empire at the beginning of the 19th century, through the brief period of independence under the Democratic Republic (1918-1920), as part of the Soviet Union (1920-1991) and subsequent transition to the post-1992 Republic of Azerbaijan.

Azerbaijan's economy experienced a substantial decline with the collapse of the Soviet Union, losing over 60% of its GDP in its first year of independence.

== Azerbaijan Democratic Republic ==
The government of the Democratic Republic of Azerbaijan did a lot of work from 1918 to 1920 to restore the Azerbaijani economy, which faced a decline following the overthrow of tsarism.

In 1919 the state budget of Azerbaijan amounted to 665 million manats. The bulk of it was replenished by selling oil and levying a profit tax, which was 30% then. Other sources of fiscal revenue were excise taxes on the sale of wine, tobacco, and oil.

The customs services, established in those years, contributed 100 million manats to the treasury. 15 million manats came from duties levied on free trade, freight and passenger transportation. In those years Azerbaijan was a more agrarian country, aimed mainly at animal husbandry. During this period, the cattle reached 1 million heads, horses – 150 thousand heads, buffaloes—300 thousand heads, camels—12 thousand heads, and rams and goats 1.5 million heads. Bartering was common in trade and economic relations of the Republic: oil was given in exchange for imported goods.

Azerbaijan was paying for military goods, telephone sets, cars, 100 locomotives, 2 thousand tanks, 5 thousand closed wagons, food products of America, France, Italy and other countries mainly with oil, cotton, wool, silk, and leather.

The export of Azerbaijani oil declined significantly following the revolution in Russia. Because of the closure of the northern market in 1919, only 0.6 million tons of oil were exported from the 3.6 million tons of oil produced. Exporting oil to Europe became possible only after the restoration of the Baku-Batumi oil pipeline in 1919 and construction of the Baku-Julfa railway.

In the years 1918-1920, the Democratic Republic of Azerbaijan made some changes in the administrative-territorial structure of the country and reorganized the financial affairs of the country.

== Within the Soviet Union ==
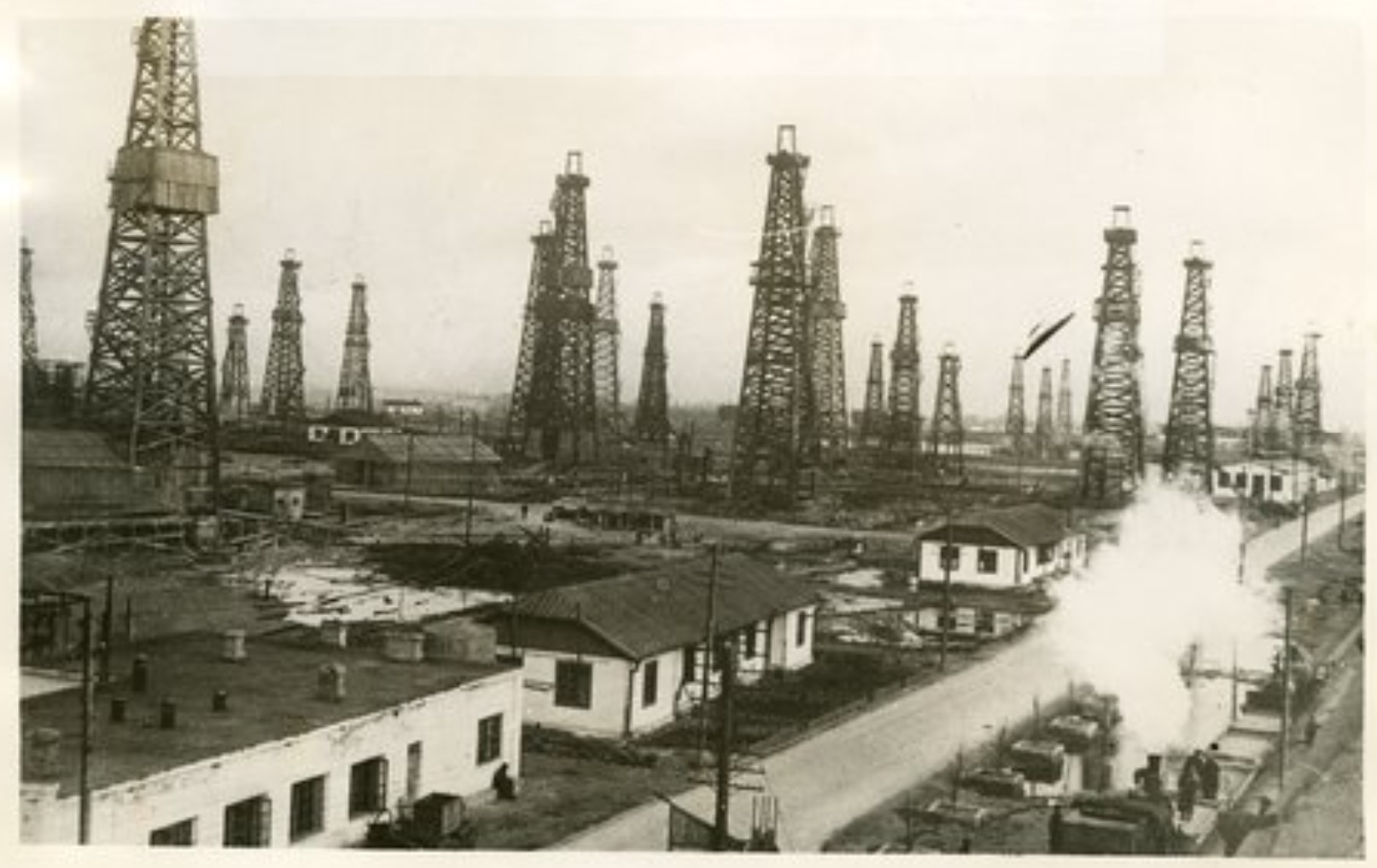
Kaganovich Oilfield, Baku, 1940

The shaping of economic structure of the country continued at a slow pace during 1920-1939. The primary economic sectors were oil, gas, chemical, light industries, food processing, machine building and metalworking.

In the first years after the Second World War, all the branches of the economy were adjusted to the requirements of the peacetime period. In 1948, the republic's industry produced more goods than in the prewar years. In 1950, the production of industrial goods increased by 39% compared to 1940. In the 1950s and 1960s, the development of Azerbaijan industry was intensified, regional and sectoral structures had been improved. The output of industrial goods increased by 5.5 times in comparison with 1940. 146 large industrial facilities, which amounted to 60% of all constructions, were built and put into production in the years between 1941 and 1970s. Major factories such as the plant for the production of pipes, aluminum and rubber synthesis in Sumqayit, the Ganja aluminum smelter, the Dashkesen ore purification plant, the Mingechaur hydroelectric power station, etc., were built and put into production for the Azerbaijani industry. Thereby the foundation was laid for the development of such industries as heavy industry, energy, chemistry, petrochemistry, oil refining, ferrous and non-ferrous metallurgy, instrument making and electrical engineering.

During these years, a lot of work was done in the direction of profitable placement of industrial sectors and facilities in the country, developing of the regions with a low standard of living, increasing the level of use of labor resources in small and medium-sized cities.

== Republic of Azerbaijan ==
=== 1990s ===
Since the country's independence in 1991, the Republic of Azerbaijan has embarked on an independent policy in the field of economy. After the dissolution of the Soviet Union, Azerbaijan's economy had been severely damaged. The poverty rate had reached 49% in 2001. Later Azerbaijan's gross national income (GNI) amounted to $7,350 (2013) per capita, GDP per capita to $7,912.5 (2013), and a poverty rate decreased to 5% in 2013. For a newly independent country with the economy mainly based on oil and gas industry, it was quite demanding to keep its say in the world of economic giants. The key objectives of the new and independent economic policy were establishment of the economic system built on the principles of several types of property, including private property, unlike the Soviet times, integration into the global economy and transition to market economy.

During the first five years of independence, GDP per capita was only a little more than one third of what it was in 1989. With the poverty rate hitting 49% as of 2001 Azerbaijan started to engage in making progress in economic situation, and by 2013, GNI per capita rose up to $7.350 with $7.912 GDP per capita and only 5% unemployment rate.

The exploitation of hydrocarbon resources has played a pivotal role in the economic development of Azerbaijan. The number of agreements with foreign companies and foreign investments had also contributed to the state's economy. Transition to market economy by adopting relevant reforms had also been one of the main objectives of the economic policy.

The first period of the economical development of Azerbaijan (from 1991-1995) can be described as the period of economic recession. The period after 1996 can be portrayed as the period of dynamic economic development.

Independence led to economic decline in Azerbaijan. Many factors caused GDP shrinking until 1996. The situation with Armenia aggravated the economic downturn.

In 1994, one of the important oil contracts was signed between Azerbaijan and 13 major oil companies, representing 8 countries of the world. This agreement went down in history as "the Contract of Century".

In the same year, the Presidents of the United States, Turkey, Azerbaijan, Georgia, Kazakhstan and Turkmenistan signed inter-State agreement on the construction of oil export pipeline Baku-Tbilisi-Ceyhan.

A contract was signed in Baku between BP, Statoil, LUKAgip, Elf Aquitaine (France) (now TOTAL), OIEC (Iran) (now NICO), TPAO and SOCAR on the promising structure of Shah Deniz gas condensate field in 1996.

In 1999, the Baku-Supsa oil pipeline was put into operation. The pipeline was built as part of the contract for the development of the Azeri-Chirag-Gunashli fields.Oil-gas sector contributed to the flourishing of other fields of economy. New reforms and measures were taken to reach macroeconomic and financial stability. During those years, Azerbaijan had joined different international institutions (IMF, World Bank, EBRD, Islam Development Bank, Asian Development Bank). The poverty rate had been decreased from 68% in 1995 to 29% in 2005 due to the economic growth.

=== 2000s and later ===
The following years from 2003 till 2009 are characterized to be the boom years due to the oil exports at high prices. Since the economy of Azerbaijan, is oil-based one, meaning the main revenues are from oil exports, the fall in petroleum prices since 2010 has made a huge impact on overall economy. This, however, has positive sides to it as well. The fall in GDP and overall economy itself, has made the government realize the urgency of the diversification of the industry. If, for example, the revenues from oil exports accounted for 42% of value added GDP, and 90.7% of total gross exports, in 2015, this number was only 34.3%. In 2005, the government decided to revalue the manat at the rate of 5,000 to 1 new manat (AZN). In 2005–2010 years average annual growth rates of "oil" GDP more than 3.5 times higher than the increase in "non-oil" GDP. The share of the oil sector in the country's GDP for this period rose from 39 to 60%. Bank loans and incentive measures of the government contributed to the rapid growth of non-oil industries. Significant growth in the construction industry and service sector led to the fact that in 2010, the non-oil sector of Azerbaijan's economy overtook the oil industry in terms of growth rates.

3 five-year programs related to the socio-economic development of the Republic of Azerbaijan were implemented in 2004-2013. These programs were aimed at economic diversification. "State Programs for Social and Economic Development for 2014-2018", "State Programs on Poverty Reduction and Sustainable Development in the Republic of Azerbaijan for 2008-2015", "State Programs for reliable food supply of the population of the Republic of Azerbaijan for 2008-2015" and a number of sectoral development programs were implemented to date.

As a result of reforms mainly involving institutional changes implemented recent years, business environment in Azerbaijan improved and the country ranked 25th among 190 countries in the Doing Business report 2019 of World Bank.

== Oil industry ==
=== History ===
The history of the oil industry in Azerbaijan dates back to 1847, when the first oil well was drilled using a primitive percussion drilling mechanism, eleven years prior to the first oil well rilled in the US, Pennsylvania. Baku became a hub for world-scale industrial investment towards the end of the 19th century.

During the Soviet period, Baku oil was the main source for WWII and for other industries, providing 75% of the whole consumption. Oil tankers were filled and transported to their destinations through the Caspian Sea, which no doubt, had a vital role in WWII. However, wide-scale exploitation of the oil reserves for industrial reasons came only in the late 20th century.

Following the collapse of the Soviet Union, the oil production dropped dramatically mainly because of the conflict over Nagorno Karabakh with Armenia, out-of-date equipment and machinery. As a result of the successful oil and gas strategy implemented by the government, the fall of the oil industry was followed by a number of fruitful oil contracts. With the "Contract of the Century” signed in 1994, and the deal on Shah Deniz gas field in 1996 initiated an exceptional amount of international investment flowing into the oil-gas sector. $60 billion foreign investment flew into the oil and gas sector of Azerbaijan from 1994 to 2010. While the oil and gas revenues were anticipated to reach $200 billion by 2024, with the current economic crisis, oil prices, and the devaluation of manat (currency of Azerbaijan), the expectations seem to be difficult to implement.

=== Oil strategy plan ===
As mentioned above, during the first years of independence when the new oil reservoirs were uncovered, foreign companies were interested in signing contracts to their benefit. In fact, almost all of them were not in favor of Azerbaijani people. In 1993, with the return of Heydar Aliyev to power, the talks that were going on since 1980s resumed and finally after long talks and negotiations Azerbaijan agreed to the terms of oil exploitation that actually reflected the nation's interests.

The biggest oil contract signed in Gulustan palace in Baku with the Western companies on September 20, 1994, was a turning point in the history of oil industry of Azerbaijan. One of the key objectives of the oil strategy was to establish petro-chemical and oil refineries, the building block of the national economy which were founded not long after the “Contract of the Century”.

== Economic reforms ==
=== Price liberalization ===
First economic reforms started in the early stage of independence, namely 1991–1993 with the liberalization of price policy and foreign economic activities. About 70–80% of consumer and producer prices were already deregulated by January, 1992 following further price liberalization rounds in April, September, and December in the same year.

The price liberalization resulted in sudden inflation in living expenses, important consumer goods and commodities. Official records show that average living expenses surpassed average income by approximately 50%.

1. The price of consumer goods increased in 1991 by 2.07 times against figures of 1990, and was growing in several times every year (10.12% times in 1992, 12.3 times in 1993, 17.63 times in 1994).
2. By the end of 1993, it was reported that the minimum weekly wage would not even buy one loaf of bread and that hundreds of thousands of refugees in Azerbaijan "simply face starvation," a situation that heightened social and political instability.

=== Privatization ===
Second most important step was the privatization law that was passed in January 1993 to support the exuberant small-scale private economy which was in a desperate need of legitimizing its business ventures and operations. The policy was designed to encourage privatization of small bulk-sale business establishments, as well as large-scale and medium companies by auctions and joint stock procedures. Retail businesses were planned to be fully privatized by the end of 199, although the process prolonged. Privatization of housing was planned to be implemented by transferring the property ownership to the current residences.

=== Budget ===
After the collapse of the Soviet Union, Azerbaijan, as all the other post-Soviet countries, started to experience the burden of losing government subsidies. So in an effort to aid the budget the government introduced excise taxes and value-added tax (VAT) as alternatives to sales and turnover taxes in early 1992.

The main sources of the budget deficit were from pay rises (increases in wages) and from military and social expenses related to the conflict in Nagorno Karabakh, mainly its defense and increasing refugee expenses. Large increases in defense and wartime expenditures (from 1.3 percent of GDP in 1991 to 7.6 percent in 1992) considerably reduced expenditures for government subsidies for consumer goods, especially in bread and fuels, as well as government investment and supplementary funding for organizations. Increasing wages of civil servants was one of the reasons of the budget deficit in 1992.

Azerbaijan introduced manat - its own currency in mid-1992. In 1994 the currency was classified as a “soft currency” and therefore non-convertible at that time.

== Banking ==
During the Soviet period and the period following its collapse, Azerbaijani banks were still dependent on Russian banks in terms of funding. Bank funds were spread in accordance with a single state plan, and government banks had little contribution when it came to the raising or allocation of funds. National Bank of Azerbaijan (NBA) was established in early 1992, with former Soviet banks, namely State Bank, the former USSR Industrial-Construction Bank, Azerbaijani bank of Agro-Industrial Bank of the USSR – being incorporated into the NBA. The name was then changed into Central Bank of the Republic of Azerbaijan with the referendum act on March 18, 2009.

NBA became one of the top level authorities in the new banking system and among the commercial banks (both state- and privately owned) with the Law on Banks and Banking Activity and the Law on the National Bank adopted in 1992. The Central Bank of Azerbaijan is the mere authority regulating the private and state-owned banks and funds at present.

== See also ==
- Economy of Azerbaijan
- History of Azerbaijan
