= Shahin Mustafayev =

Azerbaijani politician

- Şahin Mustafayev
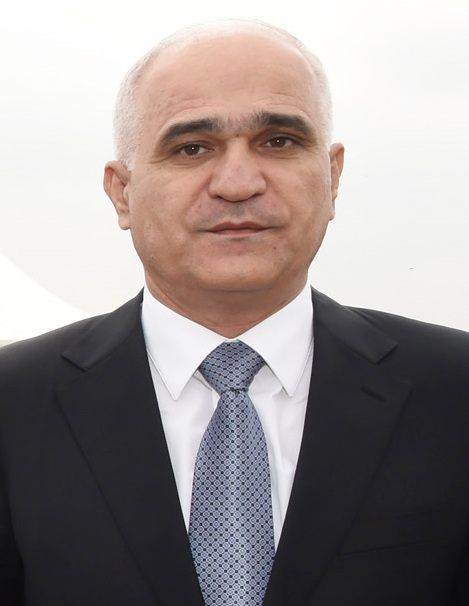
- Mustafayev in 2016

Deputy Prime Minister of Azerbaijan
- Incumbent
- Assumed office 22 October 2019
- President: Ilham Aliyev
- Prime Minister: Novruz Mammadov; Ali Asadov

Minister of Economy (Note: Mustafayev held the same portfolio under the title of "Minister of Economic Development" from 31 October 2008 until 22 October 2013 and "Minister of Economy and Industry" from 22 October 2013 until 15 January 2016.)
- In office 31 October 2008 – 22 October 2019
- Preceded by: Heydar Babayev
- Succeeded by: Mikayil Jabbarov

Deputy Minister of Taxes
- In office 6 September 2006 – 31 October 2008

Personal details
- Born: June 13, 1965 (age 60) Jujevan, Noyemberyan District, Armenian SSR, USSR
- Party: New Azerbaijan Party

Shahin Abdullah oghlu Mustafayev (Azerbaijani: Şahin Abdullah oğlu Mustafayev; born 13 June 1965) is an Azerbaijani politician serving as the Deputy Prime Minister of Azerbaijan.

== Early life ==
Mustafayev was born on 13 June 1965 in the village of Jujevan in the Noyemberyan District of the Armenian SSR. In 1989, he graduated from the Baku branch of Voznesensky Saint Petersburg State University of Economics and Finance. In 1990–1991, he worked as the Senior Accountant at Baku's Main Construction Department. In 1991–1992, he was employed as the Senior Accountant at Spektr firm. From 1992 through 1999, Mustafayev worked as an auditor, senior tax auditor, senior state auditor and department director at the State Taxation Office in Baku. In 1999–2000, he worked as the director of department for economic analysis, accounting and tax forecasts. In 2000–2003, Mustafayev was the assistant to, and then department director of Economic Analysis and Accounting Office of the Ministry of Taxes and in 2003–2005, he worked as the Senior Accountant and later as the head of Accounting Department at State Oil Company of Azerbaijan Republic (SOCAR). He then served as the Vice President for Economic Relations of SOCAR from 1 March 2005 until 9 September 2006. He's believed to have restructured and significantly improved the accounting system at SOCAR.

== Political career ==
On 6 September 2006, he became the Deputy Minister of Economy and Industry. On 31 October 2008, Mustafayev was appointed the Minister of Economic Development, replacing Heydar Babayev. Within the first few days of taking office, Mustafayev carried out a swift restructuring, firing some previous department directors of the ministry.

On 22 October 2019, he was dismissed from the post of Minister of Economy and appointed the Deputy of the Prime Minister of Azerbaijan.

Mustafayev is married and has three children.

== Gallery ==
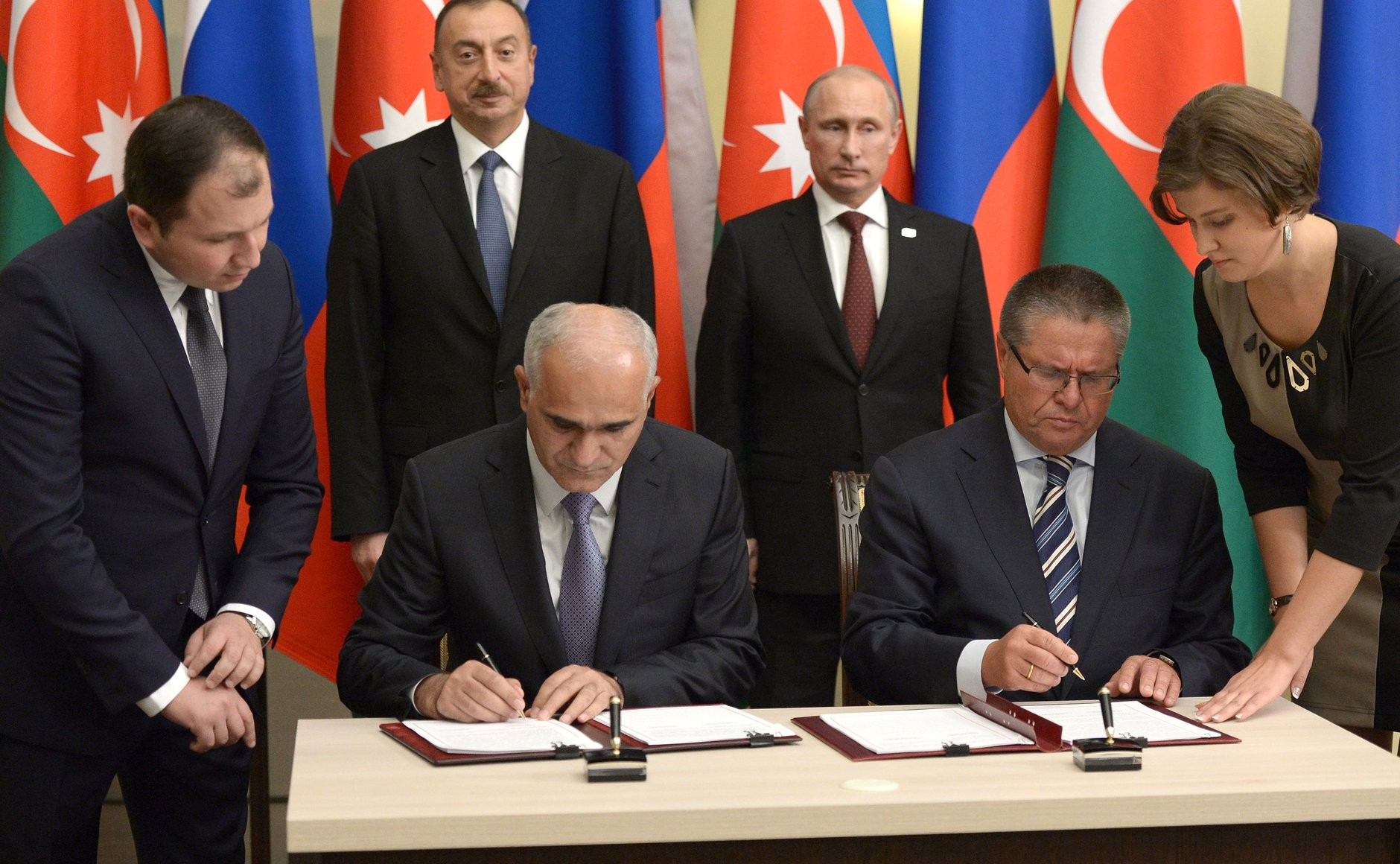

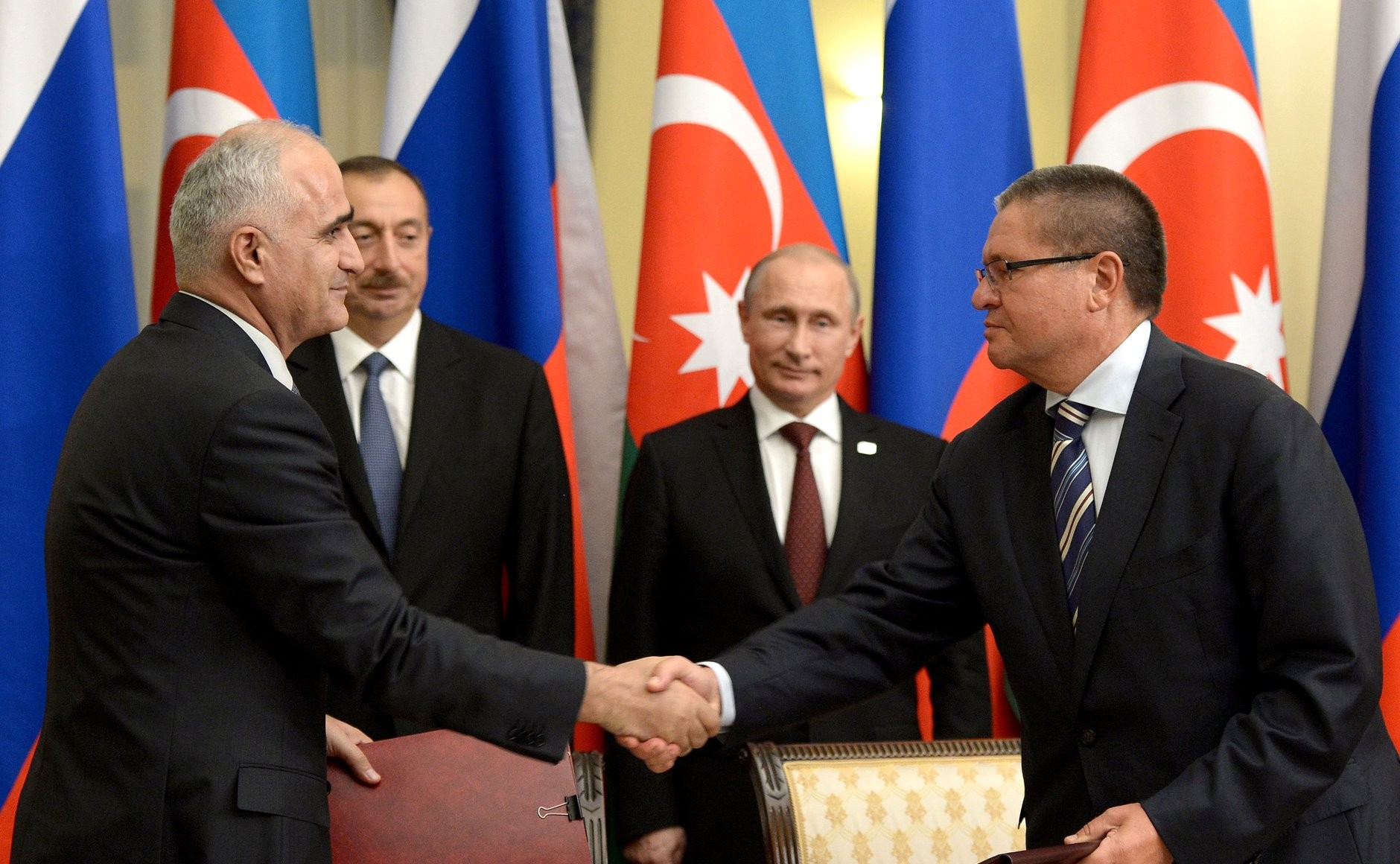

== See also ==
- Cabinet of Azerbaijan
- Economy of Azerbaijan
