= Baku Stock Exchange =

- Azerbaijani: Bakı Fond Birjası
- Type: Stock Exchange
- Location: Baku, Azerbaijan
- Founded: August 27, 1997
- Key people: Ruslan Khalilov (CEO)
- Website: www.bfb.az

The Baku Stock Exchange (BSE) (Azerbaijani: Bakı Fond Birjası) is the only stock exchange operating in Azerbaijan. BSE is organized in the form of a closed joint stock company with 19 shareholders. It currently has 38 listed companies in the exchange.

== Activity ==
The Baku Stock Exchange trades short-term treasury bonds, common stocks (primarily from former state-owned enterprises that have been privatized, including food and beverage, construction, and banking companies)

BSE carries out trading corporate securities. Trading on the primary and secondary markets of government securities (T-bills of the Ministry of Finance of Azerbaijan and banknotes of the Central Bank of Azerbaijan) are carried out solely at BSE. The state regulatory authority for the stock exchange and the Azerbaijani securities market is the Central Bank of Azerbaijan.

BSE's activity is regulated by the following legislative acts and documents:

- The Civil Code of Azerbaijan
- Central Bank of Azerbaijan
- The internal rules of BSE

== History ==
The capital market in Azerbaijan has evolved over more than a century, beginning with the establishment of the Baku Exchange in 1886. Early milestones included the issuance of bonds for the Shollar Water Line in 1909 and the first share issuance in 1913. The exchange ceased operations in 1930.

Modern capital market activity resumed with the founding of the Baku Stock Exchange (BSE) in 1997. Official trading began in 2000, expanding to include corporate bonds, equities, and central bank notes by 2004. Subsequent developments included interbank REPO operations (2006), mortgage bond trading (2009), and the establishment of a market maker institute (2013).

Major milestones include the launch of SOCAR bonds and the CETA platform (2016), the first non-financial sector securities issue (2018), and tax exemptions for publicly traded securities (2023). The BSE also strengthened its international presence by joining global networks such as the World Federation of Exchanges and the UN’s Sustainable Stock Exchanges Initiative.

In 2024, the BSE introduced a new brand identity and marked two key achievements: Azerbaijan’s first IPO and the launch of remote share trading on the secondary market.

== Management ==
The current CEO of BSE is Ruslan Khalilov. The supervisory board is headed by Farid Akhundov.

=== Organizational structure ===
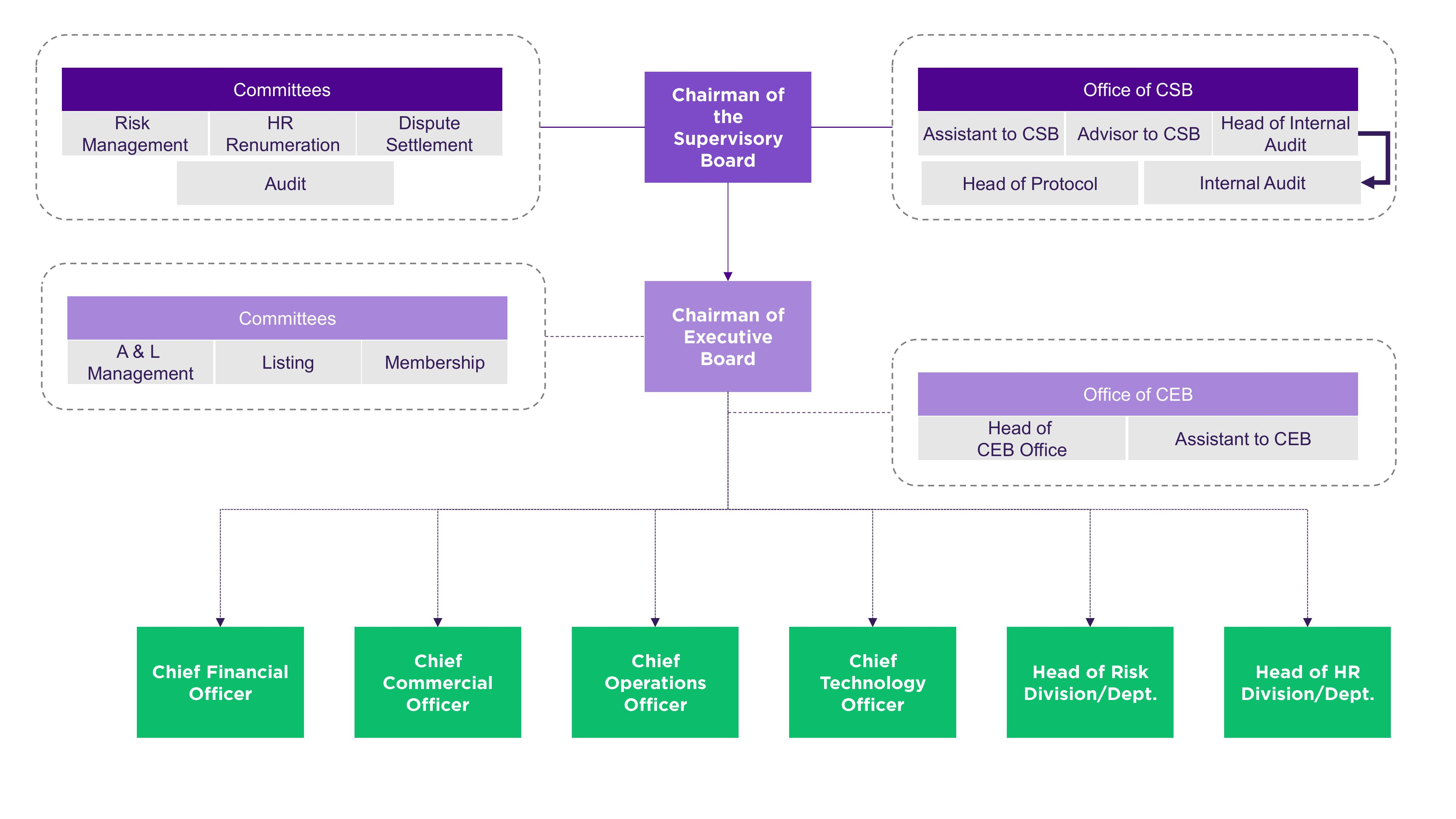
Organizational chart of BSE

== Bell events ==
Opening and closing bells on the BSE symbolize the beginning and end of each trading day of securities. As trading transactions are carried out electronically, bell-ringing ceremonies are only used to keep the tradition. These ceremonies are conducted to highlight important events regarding the stock market, as well as to bring attention to social affairs.

== Trading hours ==
The exchange’s normal trading hours are from 09:30 to 17:00 (local time, UTC +4 hours), depending on the type of instrument and market. It operates from Monday to Friday and is closed on Saturdays, Sundays, and official non-working days declared by the Government for public holidays.

== See also ==
- Financial Markets Supervisor Authority
- List of stock exchanges
- List of European stock exchanges
