= Rufat Aslanli =

Azerbaijani official (born 1970)

Rufat Aslanli Rüfət Aslanlı

Chairman of Board of Directors of Financial Markets Supervision Authority
- Incumbent
- Assumed office March 10, 2016
- President: Ilham Aliyev
- Preceded by: Heydar Babayev

Director of National Bank of Azerbaijan
- In office May 18, 2006 – November 19, 2008

Personal details
- Born: November 15, 1970 (age 55) Baku, Azerbaijan

Rufat Jabrayil oghlu Aslanli (Azerbaijani: Rüfət Aslanlı Cəbrayıl oğlu; born November 15, 1970), also spelled as Rufat Aslanly is an Azerbaijani official who serves as the Chairman of Board of Directors of Financial Markets Supervision Authority.

== Early life ==
Aslanli was born on November 15, 1970, in Baku, Azerbaijan. He graduated from Azerbaijan State Economic University in 1993. In 1993–1994, he worked as Senior Economist at Agro-Industrial Bank. In 1994, he was hired by the National Bank of Azerbaijan as Senior Economist at its Credit Policies and Currency Regulation Department. In 1998, he was appointed Director of Foreign Currency Department. In 2000, Aslanli was promoted to the position of Director of Department for Management of Credit Organizations.

== Political career ==
In December 2001, according to the decision of the National Assembly of Azerbaijan, he was elected to the board of directors of the National Bank of Azerbaijan. On May 18, 2006, he was appointed the Director of the National Bank. In December 2006, he was re-elected to the board of directors of the bank. In February 2007, he was appointed Deputy Chairman of Board of Directors of the National Bank. On November 19, 2008, Aslanli was appointed the Chairman of State Committee for Securities of Azerbaijan Republic. On March 10, 2016, he was appointed the Chairman of Board of Directors of Financial Markets Supervision Authority

He's married and has three children.

== See also ==
- Cabinet of Azerbaijan
- Baku Stock Exchange
