= Farhad Aliyev =

Azerbaijani politician (born 1963)

- Fərhad Əliyev

Minister of Economic Development
- In office April 30, 2001 – October 19, 2005
- President: Heydar Aliyev; Ilham Aliyev
- Preceded by: Position established
- Succeeded by: Heydar Babayev

Minister of State Property
- In office 24 dekabr 1999 – April 30, 2001
- President: Heydar Aliyev
- Preceded by: Position established
- Succeeded by: Position abolished

Chairman of the State Property Committee
- In office December 6, 1999 – December 24, 1999
- President: Heydar Aliyev
- Preceded by: Nadir Nasibov
- Succeeded by: Position abolished

Minister of Trade
- In office February 12, 1999 – December 6, 1999
- President: Heydar Aliyev
- Preceded by: Miri Ganbarov
- Succeeded by: Huseyngulu Baghirov

First Deputy Minister of Trade
- In office July 7, 1997 – February 12, 1999

Personal details
- Born: April 1, 1963 (age 63) Alar, Astrakhanbazar District, Azerbaijan SSR, USSR

Farhad Shovlat oglu Aliyev (Azerbaijani: Fərhad Şövlət oğlu Əliyev, [færˈɦɑt ʃœvˈlæt ɔˈɣlu æˈlijɪf], born 1 April 1963) is an Azerbaijani politician. He was born in 1963 in Azerbaijan.

== Early life ==
Farhad Aliyev received his school education at Alar village in 1970–1980, where he was born. Having completed his secondary education with an honors diploma. In 1980, he received admission to Azerbaijan State Institute of Civil Engineering (ASICE). Farhad Aliyev graduated from ASICE in 1985 and started to work in Jalilabad district. In 1985–1987 he served in the Soviet army.

During his education and military service, Farhad Aliyev actively participated in public works. He was elected Deputy Chairman of the Student Union at ASICE and received several awards for exemplary service in the army.

He is married and has two children. His eldest son, Yusif Aliyev, fought in the Second Nagorno Karabakh war.

== Political career ==
Besides public activities, Farhad Aliyev worked in several state positions during 1985–1990. At that time he headed a department in the Central Committee of the Youth Organization of Azerbaijan Republic, which played an important role in the political-public life of Azerbaijan.

In 1990–1997, he headed several private companies functioning in the field of tourism, trade, construction, production. He was a member of the Political Council of the ruling New Azerbaijan Party until his arrest.

In 1997, he was appointed Deputy Minister of Trade and after a while, the Minister of Trade. At this post, Farhad Aliyev undertook serious reforms for development of the private sector, simplification of export-import transactions, and liberalization of trade in general.

In 1999–2001, holding the post of Minister of State Property, Farhad Aliyev took several successful steps towards creation of a unified register system of state property, re-vitalization of the functioning of institutions that were opened for privatization, securing transparency in the privatization process, and attracting foreign companies to the privatization process besides Azerbaijani citizens.

In 2001, by a decree of the President of Azerbaijan, Ministries of Economy, Trade and State Property, Committee against Monopolization and for Assistance to Entrepreneurship, and State Agency for Foreign Investments were united in one state organization–Ministry of Economic Development and Farhad Aliyev was appointed the head of the Ministry.

Farhad Aliyev openly criticized monopolies, abuse of power by state officials, the corrupt court system, etc., and emphasized these problems' being obstacles on Azerbaijan's state building and development processes. In his post he organised reforms in government administration; the abolition of government structures with parallel functions, simplification of government oversight, strengthening anti-monopolization measures, infrastructural improvements, minimizing economic dependency on oil and the development of small and medium enterprises, development of foreign economic relations, in particular, broadening cooperation with international finance institutions.

On the eve of parliamentary elections in Azerbaijan, on October 19, 2005, Farhad Aliyev was detained in his office at the Ministry of Economic Development to the Ministry of National Security (MNS). After being kept there for a few hours, he was told that he was dismissed from his post and detained as a suspect with charges on coup d'état attempt.

== Amnesty ==
On 14 October 2013, Farhad Aliyev was released from prison by a pardon decree signed by the President of the Republic of Azerbaijan Ilham Aliyev. Thus, he is entitled to fully use, without any obstacles, all the rights, liberties and privileges given to the citizens in accordance with the Constitution of the Republic of Azerbaijan.
