= Baku Marionette Theatre =

The Baku Marionette Theatre
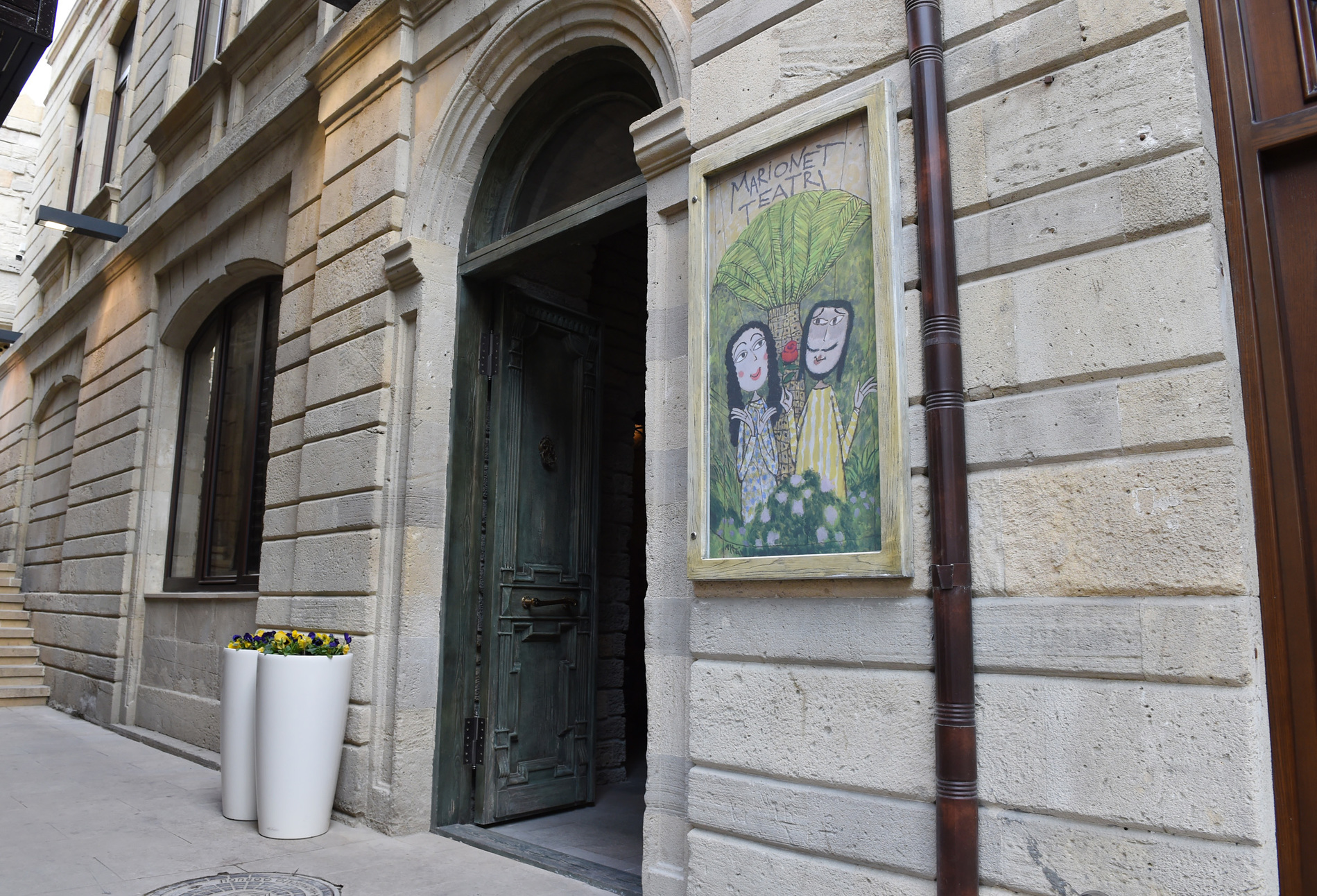
- Interactive map of The Baku Marionette Theatre
- Address: Muslum Magomayev 20, Sabail; Baku; Azerbaijan
- Capacity: 49
- Type: Marionette theatre

Construction
- Opened: 1988, April 20
- Years active: 1988—present

Baku Marionette Theatre established by the director and artist Tarlan Gorchu in 1988.

The first performance of the theater was the marionette of Uzeyir Hajibeyli's opera Arshin Mal Alan. The premiere held in France in 1990. The French press wrote: "The Marionettes are capable of everything!", "Two more nights of joy!” Thus, by the wishes of the audience, additional performances of "Arshin mal alan" were held.

In 1993, the theatre changed its status to the municipal theatre, and in 2013 joined the “Icherisheher” Administration. More favorable conditions allowed the team to focus all its creative energy on the staging of Uzeyir Hajibeyli’s opera ‘Leyli & Majnun’. In 2016, the Theatre was able to perform on its permanent stage for the first time.

The façade of the historic building was designed in the late 19th century with classical Russian architectural elements and European décor. In the 1960s, a strong fire broke out in the building, and it fell into a miserable state. Although the building was built in the 80s. Lately, the building was commissioned by the Marionette Theater, where the major reconstruction and renovation works held.

In 2013, Baku Marionette Theatre was included in the Administration of State Historical-Architectural Reserve “Icherisheher” under the Cabinet of Ministers of the Republic of Azerbaijan. With the great support of the First Lady and the First Vice President of the Republic of Azerbaijan Mehriban Aliyeva, “Icherisheher” Department allocated funds for the restoration. Finally, the restoration and repair works ended up in 2016 and the team of Marionette Theatre settled down in their permanent address.

== Gallery ==
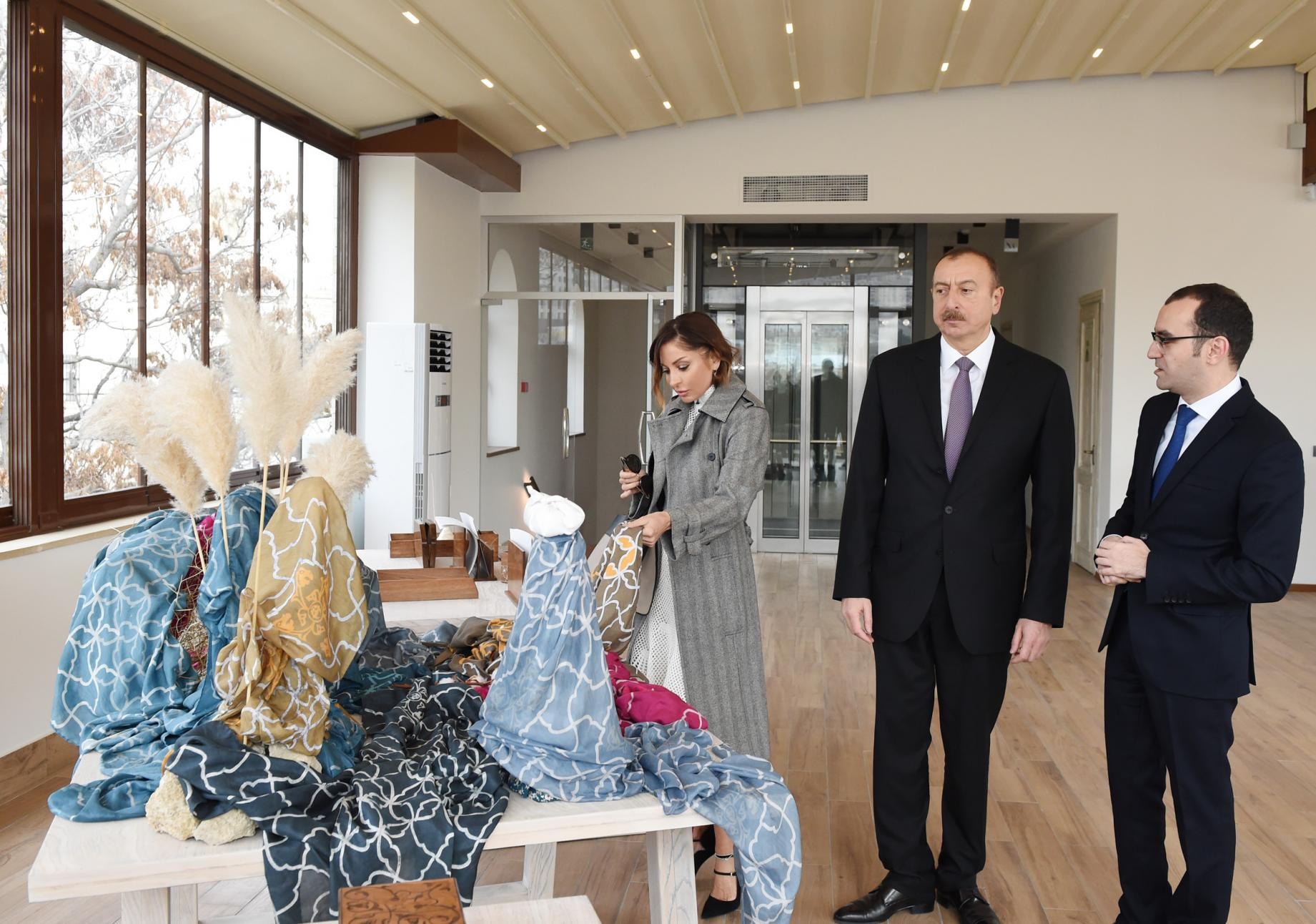

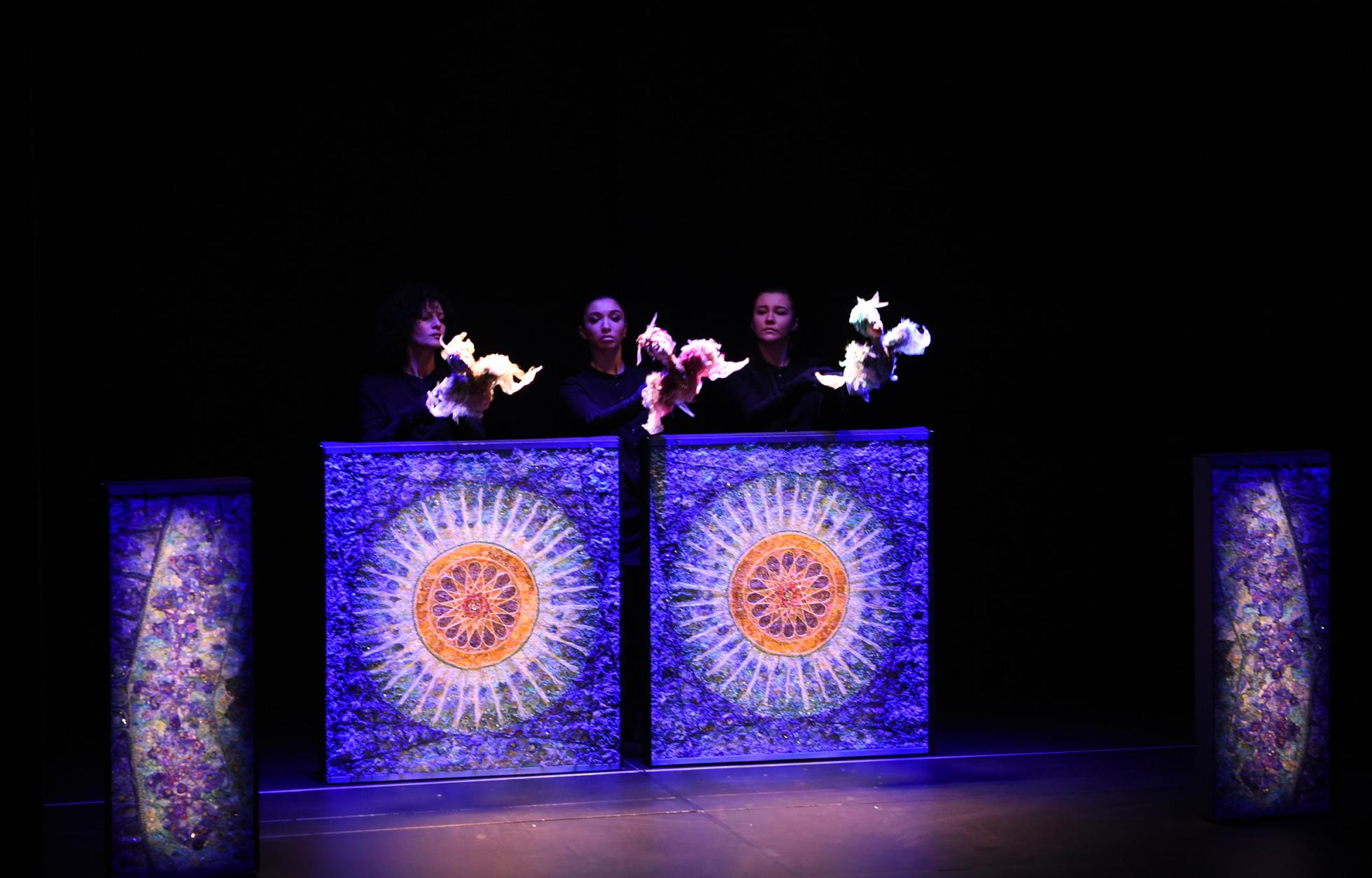

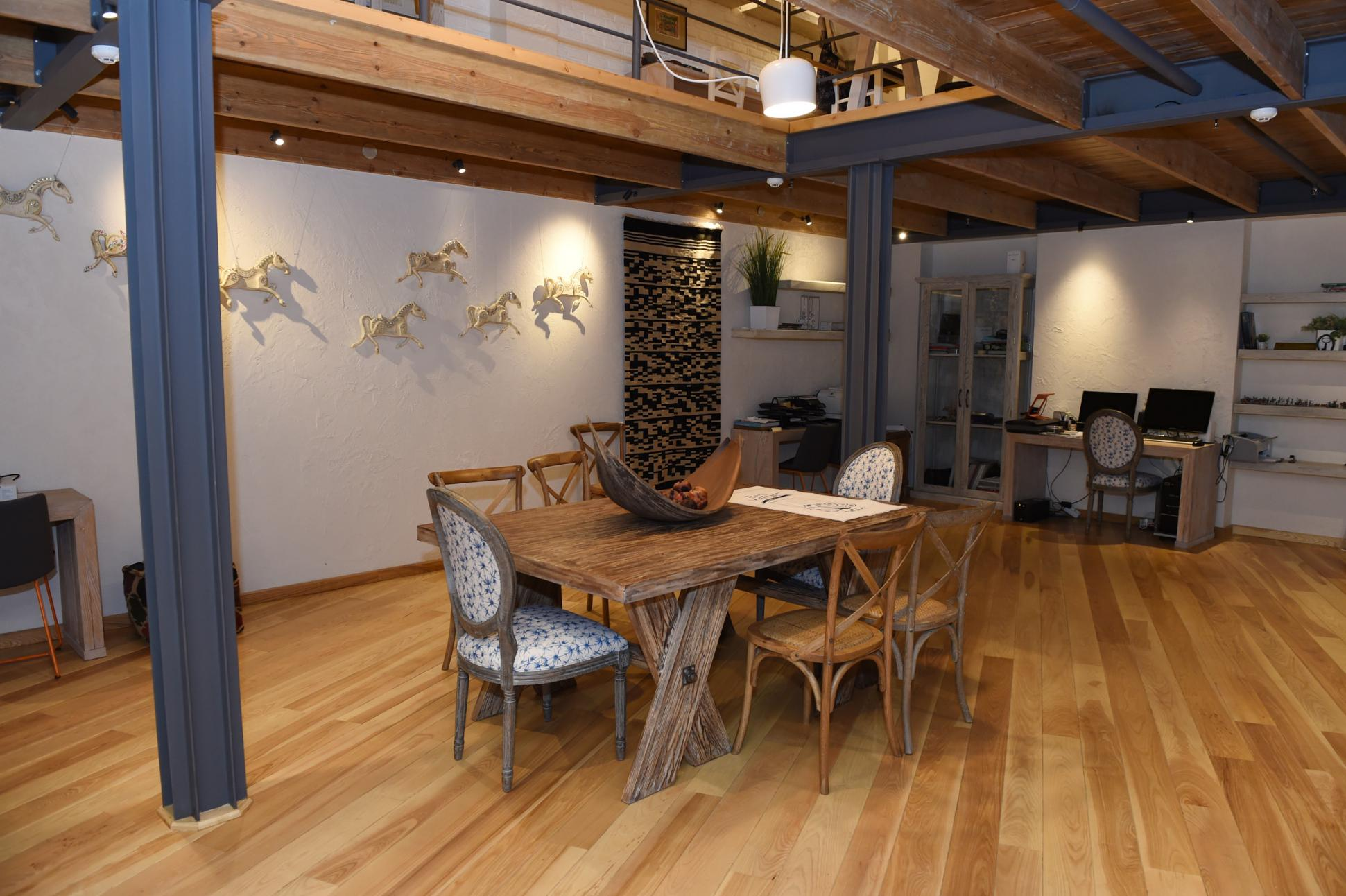
