= Azerbaijan Export and Investment Promotion Agency =

Agency overview
- Formed: 2003
- Headquarters: Baku, Neftchilar ave., 32
- Agency executive: Yusif Abdullayev, executive director
- Website: azpromo.az/en

Azerbaijan Export and İnvestment Promotion Agency (AZPROMO) is a joint public–private enterprise established by the Ministry of Economy of Azerbaijan in 2003.

== Goals and tasks ==
The main purpose of the Agency is to promote the development of the country's economy by attracting foreign investment and encouraging exports to the non-oil region.

== Organisation ==
The head of the Agency is Yusif Abdullayev. He is also Vice President of the World Association of Investment Promotion Agencies (WAIPA), as well as regional director for Central Asia.

AZPROMO maintains international offices in a number of European countries including Italy, Georgia, and Austria, as well as in China.

In the international arena, cooperation is carried out with 80 international investment promotion organizations and chambers of commerce from 37 countries. For instance, AZPROMO cooperate with the trade representation of the Russian Federation in Azerbaijan, International Finance Corporation, World Bank, the European Bank for Reconstruction and Development (EBRD), TajInvest, Chamber of Commerce of Qatar, Chamber of Commerce of Turkey, Chamber of Commerce South Africa, the Austrian-Azerbaijani Chamber of Commerce, MRC Global, Foreign Trade Chamber of Bosnia and Herzegovina, Chamber of Commerce of India PHD, Chamber of Commerce of Bulgaria, Jordanian Business Development Corporation, etc.

In September 2016, AZPROMO became a member of the Silk Road International Chamber of Commerce (SRCIC).

In December 2016, a memorandum of cooperation was signed between AZPROMO and the Turkish company TUV Austria Turk in terms of creating a certification laboratory where food and agricultural products will be analyzed.

In 2017–2018, 24 trade missions were organized on the initiative of AZPROMO.

In 2019, the Agency organized 188 events (140 in Azerbaijan, the remaining 48 in foreign countries).

In 2020, the representatives of AZPROMO participated in various international exhibitions: Worldfood 2020 in Moscow, third China international import exhibition in Shanghai, Green Week 2020 in Germany, Prodexpo 2020 in Russia, Gulfood 2020 in the UAE.

So far, the Agency has carried out 33 export missions to foreign countries within the framework of the "Made in Azerbaijan" project.

It is planned to increase exports in the non-oil sector to $3.6 billion US dollars by 2026.

== See also ==
- Economy of Azerbaijan
