= Securities market =

Component of the wider financial market

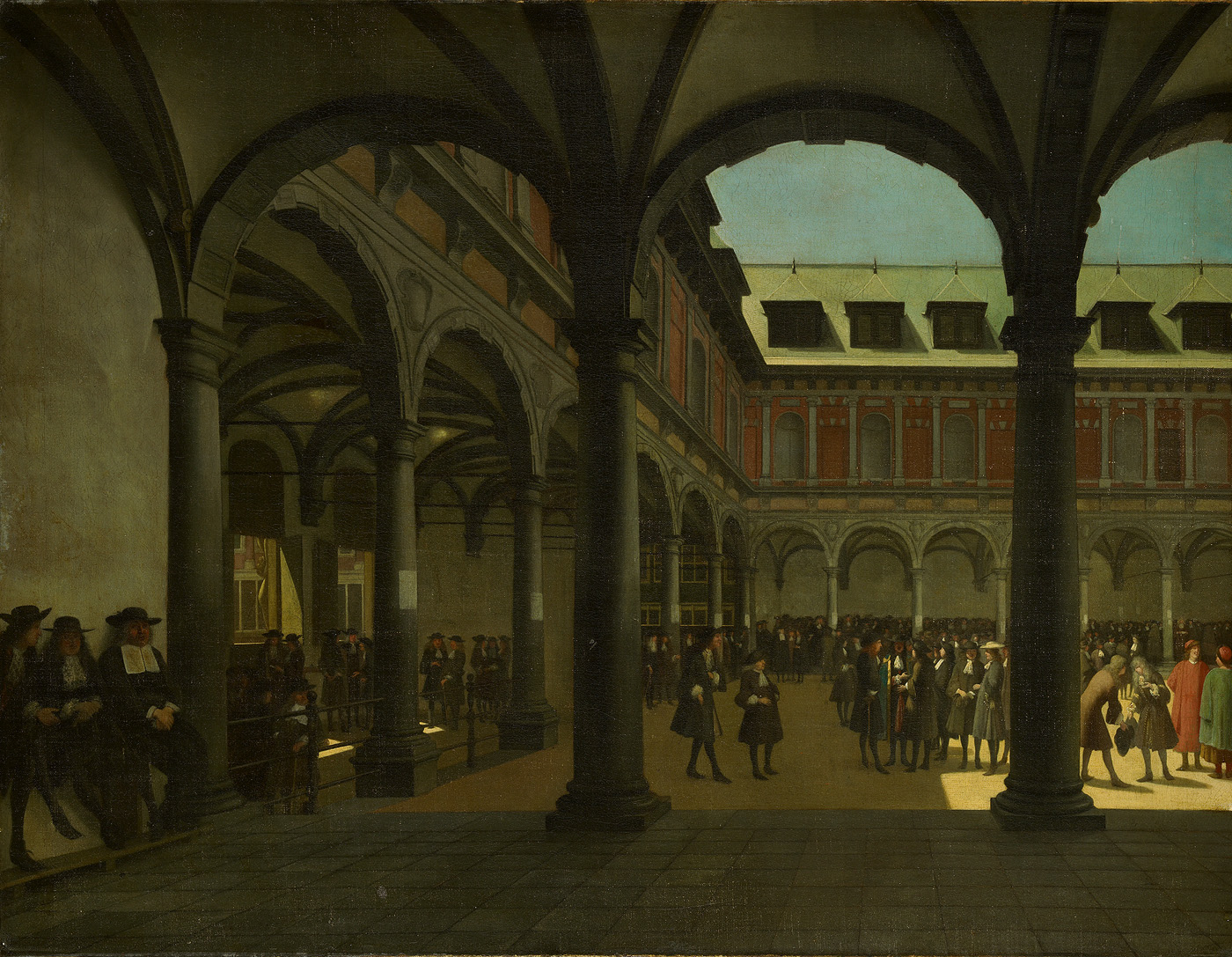
Courtyard of the Amsterdam Stock Exchange (Beurs van Hendrick de Keyser in Dutch), the foremost centre of global securities markets in the 17th century.

Security market is a component of the wider financial market where securities can be bought and sold between subjects of the economy, on the basis of demand and supply. Security markets encompasses stock markets, bond markets and derivatives markets where prices can be determined and participants both professional and non professional can meet.

Securities markets can be split into two levels: primary markets, where new securities are issued, and secondary markets where existing securities can be bought and sold. Secondary markets can further be split into organised exchanges, such as stock exchanges and over-the-counter, where individual parties come together and buy or sell securities directly. For securities holders knowing that a secondary market exists in which their securities may be sold and converted into cash increases the willingness of people to hold stocks and bonds and thus increases the ability of firms to issue securities.

There are a number of professional participants of a securities market and these include; brokerages, broker-dealers, market makers, investment managers, speculators as well as those providing the infrastructure, such as clearing houses and securities depositories.

A securities market is used in an economy to attract new capital, transfer real assets in financial assets, determine prices which will balance demand and supply and provide a means to invest money both short and long term.

== Conditions ==
A securities market is a system of interconnection between all participants (professional and nonprofessional) that provides effective conditions:

- to attract new capital by means of issuing new security (securitization of debt)
- to transfer real asset into financial asset
- to invest money for short or long term periods with the aim of deriving profitability
- commercial function (to derive profit from operation on this market)
- price determination (demand and supply balancing, the continuous process of prices movements guarantees to state correct price for each security so the market corrects mispriced securities)
- informative function (market provides all participants with market information about participants and traded instruments)
- regulation function (securities market creates the rules of trade, contention regulation, priorities determination)
- Transfer of ownership (securities markets transfer existing stocks and bonds from owners who no longer desire to maintain their investments to buyers who wish to increase those specific investments
- Insurance (hedging) of operations though securities market (options, futures, etc.)

== Levels of securities market ==
=== Primary market ===
The primary market is that part of the capital markets that deals with the issue of new securities. Companies, governments or public sector institutions can obtain funding through the sale of a new stock or bond issue. This is typically done through a syndicate of securities dealers. The process of selling new issues to investors is called underwriting. In the case of a new stock issue, this sale is a public offering. Dealers earn a commission that is built into the price of the security offering, though it can be found in the prospectus. Primary markets create long term instruments through which corporate entities borrow from capital market...

Features of primary markets are:

- This is the market for new long term equity capital. The primary market is the market where the securities are sold for the first time. Therefore, it is also called the new issue market (NIM).
- In a primary issue, the securities are issued by the company directly to investors.
- The company receives the money and issues new security certificates to the investors.
- Primary issues are used by companies for the purpose of setting up new business or for expanding or modernizing the existing business.
- The primary market performs the crucial function of facilitating capital formation in the economy.
- The new issue market does not include certain other sources of new long term external finance, such as loans from financial institutions. Borrowers in the new issue market may be raising capital for converting private capital into public capital; this is known as "going public."

=== Secondary market ===
The secondary market, also known as the aftermarket, is the financial market where previously issued securities and financial instruments such as stock, bonds, options, and futures are bought and sold. The term "secondary market" is also used to refer to the market for any used goods or assets, or an alternative use for an existing product or asset where the customer base is the second market (for example, corn has been traditionally used primarily for food production and feedstock, but a "second" or "third" market has developed for use in ethanol production). Stock exchange and over the counter markets.

With primary issuances of securities or financial instruments, or the primary market, investors purchase these securities directly from issuers such as corporations issuing shares in an IPO or private placement, or directly from the federal government in the case of treasuries. After the initial issuance, investors can purchase from other investors in the secondary market.

The secondary market for a variety of assets can vary from loans to stocks, from fragmented to centralized, and from illiquid to very liquid. The major stock exchanges are the most visible example of liquid secondary markets – in this case, for stocks of publicly traded companies. Exchanges such as the New York Stock Exchange, Nasdaq and the American Stock Exchange provide a centralized, liquid secondary market for the investors who own stocks that trade on those exchanges. Most bonds and structured products trade "over the counter", or by phoning the bond desk of one's broker-dealer. Loans sometimes trade online using a Loan Exchange.

There exists a private secondary market for shares who have not yet went through the IPO process. This market is also known as 'secondaries' because it is a secondary market, although shares are traded privately, typically through registered broker-dealers or between counterparties directly.

=== Over-the-counter market ===
Over-the-counter (OTC) or off-exchange trading is to trade financial instruments such as stocks, bonds, commodities or derivatives directly between two parties. It is contrasted with exchange trading, which occurs via facilities constructed for the purpose of trading (i.e., exchanges), such as futures exchanges or stock exchanges. In the U.S., over-the-counter trading in stock is carried out by market makers that make markets in OTCBB and Pink Sheets securities using inter-dealer quotation services such as Pink Quote (operated by Pink OTC Markets) and the OTC Bulletin Board (OTCBB). OTC stocks are not usually listed nor traded on any stock exchanges, though exchange listed stocks can be traded OTC on the third market. Although stocks quoted on the OTCBB must comply with United States Securities and Exchange Commission (SEC) reporting requirements, other OTC stocks, such as those stocks categorized as Pink Sheet securities, have no reporting requirements, while those stocks categorized as OTCQX have met alternative disclosure guidelines through Pink OTC Markets. An over-the-counter contract is a bilateral contract in which two parties agree on how a particular trade or agreement is to be settled in the future. It is usually from an investment bank to its clients directly. Forwards and swaps are prime examples of such contracts. It is mostly done via the computer or the telephone. For derivatives, these agreements are usually governed by an International Swaps and Derivatives Association agreement.

This segment of the OTC market is occasionally referred to as the "Fourth Market".

The NYMEX has created a clearing mechanism for a slate of commonly traded OTC energy derivatives which allows counterparties of many bilateral OTC transactions to mutually agree to transfer the trade to ClearPort, the exchange's clearing house, thus eliminating credit and performance risk of the initial OTC transaction counterparts..

== Main financial instruments ==
Bond, Promissory note, Cheque – a security contains requirement to make full payment to the bearer of cheque, Certificate of deposit, Bill of Lading (a Bill of Lading is a "document evidencing the receipt of goods for shipment issued by a person engaged in the business of transporting or forwarding goods." ), Stock.

=== Promissory note ===
A promissory note, referred to as a note payable in accounting, or commonly as just a "note", is a contract where one party (the maker or issuer) makes an unconditional promise in writing to pay a sum of money to the other (the payee), either at a fixed or determinable future time or on demand of the payee, under specific terms. They differ from IOU's in that they contain a specific promise to pay, rather than simply acknowledging that a debt exists.

=== Certificate of deposit ===
A certificate of deposit or CD is a time deposit, a financial product commonly offered to consumers by banks, thrift institutions, and credit unions. CDs are similar to savings accounts in that they are insured and thus virtually risk-free; they are "money in the bank" (CDs are insured by the FDIC for banks or by the NCUA for credit unions). They are different from savings accounts in that the CD has a specific, fixed term (often three months, six months, or one to five years), and, usually, a fixed interest rate. It is intended that the CD be held until maturity, at which time the money may be withdrawn together with the accrued interest.

=== Bond ===
Bond - an issued security establishing its holder's right to receive from the issuer of the bond, within the time period specified therein,

- its nominal value
- and the interest fixed therein on this value or other property equivalent.

The bond may provide for other property rights of its holder, where this is not contrary to legislation.

=== Stocks (shares) ===
==== Common shares ====
Common shares represent ownership in a company and a claim (dividends) on a portion of profits. Investors get one vote per share to elect the board members, who oversee the major decisions made by management. Over the long term, common stock, by means of capital growth, yields higher returns than almost every other investment. This higher return comes at a cost since common stocks entail the most risk. If a company goes bankrupt and liquidates, the common shareholders will not receive money until the creditors, and preferred shareholders are paid.

==== Preferred share ====
Preferred share represents some degree of ownership in a company but usually doesn't come with the same voting rights (this may vary depending on the company). With preferred shares, investors are usually guaranteed a fixed dividend forever. This is different than common stock, which has variable dividends that are never guaranteed. Another advantage is that in the event of liquidation preferred shareholders are paid off before the common shareholder (but still after debt holders). Preferred stock may also be callable, meaning that the company has the option to purchase the shares from shareholders at any time for any reason (usually for a premium). Some people consider preferred stock to be more like debt than equity.

== Professional participants ==
Professional participants in the securities markets – legal persons, including credit organizations, and also citizens registered as business persons who conduct the following types of activity:

- Brokerage shall be deemed performance of civil-law transactions with securities as agent or commission agent acting under a contract of agency or commission, and also under a power (letter) of attorney for the performance of such transactions in the absence of indication of the powers of agent or commission agent in the contract.
- Dealer activity shall be deemed performance of transactions in the purchase and sale of securities in one's own name and for one's own account through the public announcement of the prices of purchase and/or sale of certain securities, with an obligation of the purchase and/or sale of these securities at the prices announced by the person pursuing such activity.
- Activity in the management of securities shall be deemed performance by a legal person or individual business person, in his own name, for a remuneration, during a stated period, of trust management of the following conveyed into his possession and belonging to another person, in the interests of this person or of third parties designated by this person:
1. securities;
2. monies intended for investment in securities;
3. monies and securities received in the process of securities management.
- Clearing activity shall be deemed activity in determining mutual obligations (collection, collation and correction of information on security deals and

preparation of bookkeeping documents thereon) and in offsetting these obligations in deliveries of securities

- Depositary activity shall be deemed the rendering of services in the safekeeping of certificates of securities and/or recording and transfer of rights to securities
- Activity in the keeping of a register of owners of securities shall be deemed collection, fixing, processing, storage and provision of data constituting a system of keeping the register of security owners
- Provision of services directly promoting conclusion of civil-law transactions with securities between participants in the securities market shall be deemed activity in the arrangement of trading on the securities market.

== See also ==
- Commodity markets
- Securitization
- Financial engineering
