= Ministry of Economy (Azerbaijan) =

Azerbaijani governmental agency

Ministry of Economy of Azerbaijan Republic
- Azərbaycan Respublikası İqtisadiyyat Nazirliyi
- Coat of arms of Azerbaijan

- The logo of the Ministry of Economy of Azerbaijan

Agency overview
- Formed: April 30, 2001
- Jurisdiction: Government of Azerbaijan
- Headquarters: 23 Niyazi Street, Baku, Azerbaijan Republic AZ1066
- Agency executives: Mikayil Jabbarov, Minister of Economy; Elnur Aliyev, First Deputy Minister; Samad Bashirli, Deputy Minister; Sahib Alakbarov, Deputy Minister; Rovnag Abdullayev, Deputy Minister; Anar Akhundov, Deputy Minister
- Website: www.economy.gov.az

The Ministry of Economy of Azerbaijan Republic (Azerbaijani: Azərbaycan Respublikası İqtisadiyyat Nazirliyi) is the central executive body responsible for implementing state policy and regulation of the economy in Azerbaijan.

== History ==
In 1918–1920, the first Ministry of Commerce and Industry of independent Azerbaijan carried out its functions within the government of Azerbaijan Democratic Republic.

In the Soviet Socialist Republic of Azerbaijan, which was a part of the USSR in 1920–1991, economic issues were regulated by such committees as the Ministry of Commerce, Industry and Food, the Ministry of Trade and Industry, and the State Planning Committee of the USSR.

April 30, 2001 - State Property Ministry, Ministry of Economy, Ministry of Trade, State Committee for Antimonopoly Policy and Support of Entrepreneurship, and Foreign Investments Agency were abolished, and the Ministry of Economic Development was established based on these bodies according to the Decree of the President of Azerbaijan Republic.

October 22, 2013 - The Ministry of Economy and Industry was established based on the Ministry of Economic Development in accordance with the Order of the President of Azerbaijan Republic.

January 15, 2016 - The Ministry of Economy of Azerbaijan was established based on the Ministry of Economy and Industry in accordance with the Order of the President of Republic.

October 23, 2019 – New structure of the Ministry was approved by Decree of the President of Azerbaijan.

=== Recent activities ===
November 20, 2019 – Azerbaijan's Minister of Economy Mikayil Jabbarov was elected as Chairman of the Coordination Council of Heads of Tax Services of the CIS Member States.

December 6, 2019—the International Conference dedicated to the 20th Anniversary of signing the Basic Multilateral Agreement on International Transport for Development of the Europe-the Caucasus-Asia Corridor and the Fourteenth Annual Meeting of the Intergovernmental Commission (IGC) TRACECA was held in Baku.

December 6, 2019 – The Republic of Azerbaijan officially assumed the chairmanship in the Intergovernmental Commission TRACECA.

December 9, 2019 – The Republic of Azerbaijan and the Russian Federation signed a Protocol of Intent on Economic Cooperation.

April 8, 2020—The program to compensate entrepreneurs and their employees for the damage caused by the coronavirus (COVID-19) pandemic was launched in accordance with the Action Plan adopted by the Cabinet of Ministers in order to reduce the negative impact on business entities due to the coronavirus pandemic

May 4, 2020 – The Ministry of Economy launched a new mechanism on partial refund of VAT paid for goods by individual consumers

October 15, 2020 - Financial sanctions against small and microbusiness entities from areas fully and partially occupied, as well as front-line territories, were lifted

May 29, 2021 – President Ilham Aliyev inaugurated a new building of the Ministry of Economy.

== Structure ==
=== Organizations under the auspices of the Ministry of Economy ===
- State Tax Service
  - State Service on Property Issues
  - State Service for Antimonopoly Policy and Consumer Market Control
- Agency for Development of Economic Zones
  - Entrepreneurship Development Fund
  - The Small and Medium Business Development Agency
  - Baku Business Center
  - Institute for Scientific Research on Economic Reforms
  - “Consumer Goods Expertise Center” LLC
- Center for Analysis and Coordination of the Fourth Industrial Revolution

=== Bodies founded by the Ministry of Economy ===
- Azerbaijan Export and Investment Promotion Agency (AZPROMO)
- “Azerbaijan Investment Company” OJSC
- “Tamiz Shahar” OJSC
- “AzerGold” OJSC
- “Azerkhalcha” OJSC

=== The State Program on Economic development ===
- State Program on the socio-economic development of regions of Azerbaijan Republic in 2019-2023
- State Program on the socio-economic development of regions of Azerbaijan Republic in 2014-2018
- State Program on socio-economic development of Baku city and its settlements in 2014–2016 years
- State Program on socio-economic development of Baku city and its settlements in 2011–2013 years
- State Program on socio-economic development of regions of the Republic of Azerbaijan for 2009–2013 years
- State Program on Poverty Reduction and Sustainable Development (SPPRSD) in the Republic of Azerbaijan for 2008-2015
- State Program on the reliable food supply of the population in the Azerbaijan Republic in 2008-2015
- State Program for the development of industry in Azerbaijan in 2015-2020

== List of ministers of economy ==
- Farhad Aliyev, April 30, 2001 - October 19, 2005
- Heydar Babayev, October 19, 2005 - October 31, 2008
- Shahin Mustafayev, October 31, 2008 - October 23, 2019
- Mikayil Jabbarov, October 23, 2019 - incumbent

== See also ==
- Cabinet of Azerbaijan
- Economy of Azerbaijan
- Economic development in Azerbaijan
