= Mollalı =

Mollalı or Mollaly may refer to:

- Mollalı, Barda, Azerbaijan
- Mollalı, Jalilabad, Azerbaijan
- Mollalı, Oghuz, Azerbaijan
- Mollalı, Qubadli, Azerbaijan
