= Rustam Ibrahimbekov =

Soviet and Azerbaijani writer, screenwriter, and film director (1939–2022)

Rustam Ibrahimbeyov
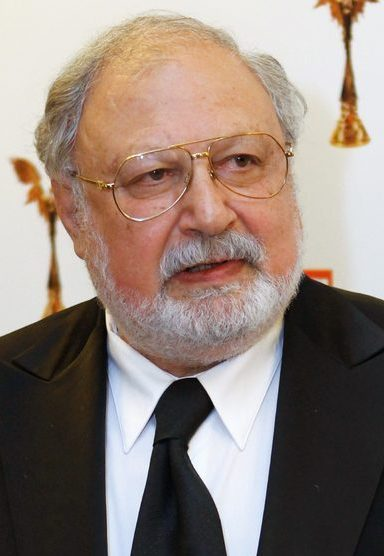
- Born: 5 February 1939; Baku, Azerbaijan SSR, USSR
- Died: 11 March 2022 (aged 83); Moscow, Russia
- Citizenship: Russia
- Occupations: Film director, screenwriter and cinematographer

Signature
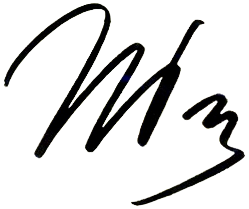

Rustam Mammad Ibrahim oghlu Ibrahimbeyov (or Ibrahimbekov; Azerbaijani: Rüstəm Məmməd İbrahim oğlu İbrahimbəyov; Russian: Рустам Мамед Ибрагим оглы Ибрагимбеков; 5 February 1939 – 11 March 2022) was a Soviet and Azerbaijani screenwriter, playwright, and producer, well known beyond his home Azerbaijan and the former Soviet Union. He was the chair of the Cinematographers' Union of Azerbaijan and director of the Ibrus Theatre.

== Early life and education ==
Rustam İbrahimbeyov was born in Baku, Azerbaijan SSR, to Mammadibrahim Ibrahimbeyov and Fatima Meshadibeyova. His father was a professor of art history who hailed from Shamakhi. Ibragimbekov is the younger brother of Magsud Ibrahimbeyov, an Azerbaijani writer and politician.

İbrahimbeyov graduated from Azerbaijan Oil and Chemistry Institute, then studied script writing and film directing at the Gerasimov Institute of Cinematography in Moscow.

== Film career ==
His screenwriting credits include more than 40 film and television scripts, numerous plays and pieces of prose, and nearly all of his scripts were eventually made into full feature or TV films, including White Sun of the Desert (1970, Белое солнце пустыни), Interrogation (1979, Допрос), Guard Me, My Talisman (1986, Храни меня, мой талисман), Urga (Урга, Территория любви, 1991), Burnt by the Sun (1994, Утомлённые солнцем), The Barber of Siberia (1998, Сибирский цирюльник), East/West (1999), Broken Bridges (2004) and Nomad (2005/2007).

White Sun of the Desert (1969), for which he co-wrote the script with Valentin Yezhov, became a cult film in the USSR. From the 1970s, he collaborated with Nikita Mikhalkov. Urga, Territory of Love, directed by Mikhalkov and released in North America as Close to Eden, won the Golden Lion Award in the Venice Film Festival, as well as the Felix Award in Berlin as Best European Film. Close to Eden was nominated for an American Film Academy Award (Oscar) in 1995 as Best Foreign Language Film. Burnt by the Sun (directed by Mikhalkov) received an Academy Award for Best Foreign Language Film in 1994 and the Grand Prize of the Jury at 47th Cannes International Film Festival; their film The Barber of Siberia was the most expensive European production of 1997. However, in 2008, he admitted having effectively stopped working with Mikhalkov due to political disagreements between them.

Ibragimbekov was co-screenwriter with Sergei Bodrov of French director Régis Wargnier's Oscar-nominated 1999 movie East/West.

== Writing and theater work ==
Ibragimbekov was a well-known writer. Several collected works were published in Russia, Azerbaijan and abroad. He also wrote over ten theater plays that were staged in numerous theaters. In 2001, Ibragimbekov founded Ibrus, a cultural center in Baku functioning as a theater where plays are acted in both Azerbaijani and Russian.

== Other roles ==
In 1987, İbrahimbeyov was a member of the jury at the 15th Moscow International Film Festival.

He was the head of the awards jury at the inaugural Golden Minbar International Festival of Muslim Cinema in 2005.

Ibragimbekov was the chairman of the Confederation of Filmmakers' Unions (CFU), which represents filmmakers from all of the former Soviet republics, Secretary of the Russian Filmmakers' Union, and member of the European Film Academy and Academy of Motion Picture Arts and Sciences.

== Public activity and criticism ==
In the late Soviet epoch, Ibrahimbeyov was a supporter of the Popular Front of Azerbaijan which called for democratic reforms and Azerbaijan's sovereignty. He signed petitions addressed to Kamran Baghirov and Ayaz Mutallibov in the aftermath of Black January (also known as Black Saturday or the January Massacre), was a violent crackdown in Baku on 19–20 January 1990, pursuant to a state of emergency during the dissolution of the Soviet Union when Soviet troops entered Baku and shot over 130 participants of a peaceful pro-Popular Front rally, bypassers, and medical personnel rushing to provide assistance.

In 2009, Rustam Ibrahimbeyov became one of the founders of the Intelligentsia Forum, an Azerbaijani public organization that unites prominent scientists, writers, and journalists. The forum unanimously criticized the arrest of Azerbaijani bloggers Emin Milli and Adnan Hajizadeh accused of "hooliganism," and demanded the government release opposition journalist Eynulla Fatullayev imprisoned allegedly for defamation, encouraging terrorism, and drug possession. He reportedly attended opposition rallies in Baku.

Ibrahimbeyov repeatedly criticized the 2009 constitutional amendment that lifted the two-term limit for the presidency in Azerbaijan, calling it "shameful". At the same time, he admitted seeing no real alternative to the current president, Ilham Aliyev. He openly appealed to Aliyev, asking to free the government of incompetent people he referred to as "cheats" who comprise the "core part of the system".

Ibrahimbeyov's criticism targeted Azerbaijan's Ministry of Culture and Tourism for artificially creating obstacles in order to obliterate the initiative of the Cinematographers' Union of Azerbaijan (chaired by Ibrahimbeyov) to open and maintain the Higher School of Filmmaking in Baku. He accused the Head of the Presidential Administration, Ramiz Mehdiyev, and the Head of the Department of the Arts of the said administration, Fatma Abdullazadeh, of "doing everything possible" to obstruct cultural projects of the Union for the past ten years, namely the annual East/West International Film Festival or screenings of Azerbaijani films in rural parts of the country. According to Ibrahimbeyov, aspiring filmmakers have no opportunities of studying in Azerbaijan and can only hope to be state-funded to study abroad, if they bribe the appropriate officials.

Due to his public activity, the forum and namely İbrahimbeyov became subject to criticism from various government figures and members of the ruling party. He was unable to purchase land near the Martyrs' Lane due to legal issues involving the government and hence resorting to critical statements targeting state policy and government establishments such as SOCAR. Ibragimbekov refuted these claims by stating that SOCAR deliberately incurs in his private property in the Baku suburb of Bayil intending to install oil rigs there without having proper documentation.

In June 2012, an organization alternative to the Cinematographers' Union of Azerbaijan and named the Cinematographers' Union of the Republic of Azerbaijan was established, uniting many members of the former. The executive committee assessed Ibrahimbeyov's work as a union chair as "unsatisfactory". Ibrahimbeyov responded by stating that the establishment of the new union was orchestrated by the government due to his political activity and that should the new union with almost the same name and function be officially registered, the political nature of its creation would become obvious. He explained the creative problems experienced by the union he has chaired by the difficulties which the government had caused for its existence. Nevertheless, he expressed hope that the new union would engage in a productive activity. Ibragimbekov believed members of the new union may have been pressured by the government into speaking out against the union he chairs.

In an interview to Azerbaijani media, Polish director Krzysztof Zanussi praised Ibrahimbeyov for his contribution to both Azerbaijani and world film. However, this particular part of the interview was censored out and not included in the official publication. Around the same time the head of the Presidential Administration of Azerbaijan Ali Hasanov attacked Ibrahimbeyov in the media, accusing him of fraud committed against businesspeople in Moscow. He also commented on the establishment of a new union, saying film making required "skilled people, as opposed to those who cannot do anything." He added that Ibrahimbeyov should not expect to be thanked by Azerbaijani society for "having directed a couple of movies or so." For these remarks, Hasanov himself came under the attack of Azerbaijani human rights activists. Chair of the Committee for the Protection of Women's Rights Novella Jafarova believes Hasanov must be made legally accountable according to the Azerbaijani law, which still considers libel a criminal offence but seems to be applied only against journalists. Chair of the Azerbaijan National Committee of Helsinki Citizens' Assembly Arzu Abdullayeva said Hasanov's words as those coming from the head of a social and political department are illogical. According to her, Ibrahimbeyov's reputation is impeccable in Azerbaijan, and he would not even react to this attack because he and Hasanov "are in different weight classes."

In July 2012, Russian writer of Azerbaijani descent Eduard Bagirov publicly renounced his membership with the Writers' Union of Azerbaijan and the All-Russia Azerbaijanii Congress as a form of protest against political repressions targeting Ibrahimbeyov in Azerbaijan.

In 2010, after the All-Russian Azerbaijani Congress (at the time, the leading Azerbaijani diaspora organization in Russia) implemented some structural changes, Ibrahimbeyov, who held Russian citizenship and had been one of the vice-presidents of the Congress, was demoted from his position. He later explained these changes by a directive coming from Baku. In 2012, Ibrahimbeyov declared the Congress a non-functioning entity and co-established the Union of Azerbaijani Organizations of Russia together with high-ranking Russian businessmen of Azerbaijani origin: Aras Agalarov (father of Ilham Aliyev's son-in-law Emin Agalarov), Vagit Alekperov, Telman Ismailov, Isgandar Khalilov, Abbas Abbasov, Soyun Sadikhov, and Ramazan Abdulatipov (originally Dagestani). This led to a new wave of criticism of Ibrahimbeyov on the part of state-sponsored media and accusations of him "being sympathetic to Armenians", "embezzling public funds" and "having exhausted his talent as a director". In addition, he was accused of pandering to Russia's interests in the region by fellow diaspora activists. Ibrahimbeyov claimed the Union was formed due to the inactivity of other diaspora organizations and has no political agenda.

== Legal issues ==
In December 2012, Ibrahimbeyov was held up at the Heydar Aliyev International Airport in Baku, reportedly due to the fact that the computer system had failed to identify him. In January 2013, he was held up again and told that he had been forbidden to access his flight from the airport's VIP zone. In the common zone, where Ibrahimbeyov then proceeded, the computer system was again said to have been unresponsive. According to Eldar Namazov, who witnessed the scene, Ibrahimbeyov was only let through after a "notification" was received from the authorities.

On 3 June 2013, Ibrahimbeyov filed a lawsuit against Ali Hasanov, then the Head of the Department of Social Political Issues of the Presidential Administration of Azerbaijan, for libel. According to Ibrahimbeyov's lawyer, the court refused to take the lawsuit for various reasons, and the courts of appeal upheld those decisions. Finally, the process was started following the decision of the Supreme Court of Azerbaijan. As of 21 June, the court had adjourned the hearing three times due to the defendant's failure to show up.

== Personal life ==
Rustam Ibrahimbeyov is the father of director Fuad Ibrahimbeyov by his first marriage to Shohrat Ibrahimbeyova. A year later the couple divorced, and Rustam Ibrahimbeyov married actress Lyudmila Dukhovnaya by whom he has a daughter named Fatima. Rustam Ibrahimbeyov died after a long illness at his home in Moscow, on 11 March 2022, at the age of 83. He was buried at the Alley of Honor in Baku.

== Honours and awards ==
- Honoured Artist of Azerbaijan SSR (23 December 1976)
- Lenin Komsomol Prize (1979) – for the screenplays of White Sun of the Desert (1969), A Tale Chekist (1969) and plays Home on the Sand (1976), Interrogation, or Moment of Truth (1978)
- State Prize of Azerbaijan SSR (1980) – a script for the film Birthday (1978)
- USSR State Prize (1981) – for the screenplay Interrogation (1979)
- State Prize of the Russian Federation (1993) – a script for the film Urga (1991); for the screenplay of the film Burnt by the Sun (1994); for the screenplay of the film White Sun pusyni (1969); for the screenplay of the film The Barber of Siberia (1998)
- Academy Award ("Oscar") for Best Foreign Language Film, Burnt by the Sun (1994, American Academy of Motion Picture Arts and Sciences)
- Honoured Artist of Russia (28 December 1995)
- Grand Prix of the MTF of the Commonwealth of Independent States countries (1998)
- Order of Merit for the Fatherland, 3rd class (9 February 1999) – for outstanding contribution to the development of national cinematography
- Prize for best feature film of the Interregional Festival "Eurasia Kaleidoscope" (2000)
- Diploma of the Moscow City Duma (2009)
- Honorary member of the Arts
- Golden Orange (2011)

=== Renouncing the Order of Arts and Letters ===
Ibrahimbeyov was awarded the title of Commander of the French Order of Arts and Letters in 2000. He renounced this award in 2012 as a sign of protest against a French law criminalizing the refusal to qualify the 1915 events as "the Armenian genocide." In an open letter, he stated, "For opportunistic purposes and electoral gains, which are so highly insignificant compared to the democratic image of the country, there has been passed a law preventing the people of France from exercising their basic civil right of self-expression." Ibrahimbeyov also quit the position of President of the Azerbaijan—France Cultural Ties Society.
