= Rashadat Akhundov =

Azerbaijani activist (born 1984)

- Rəşadət Axundov
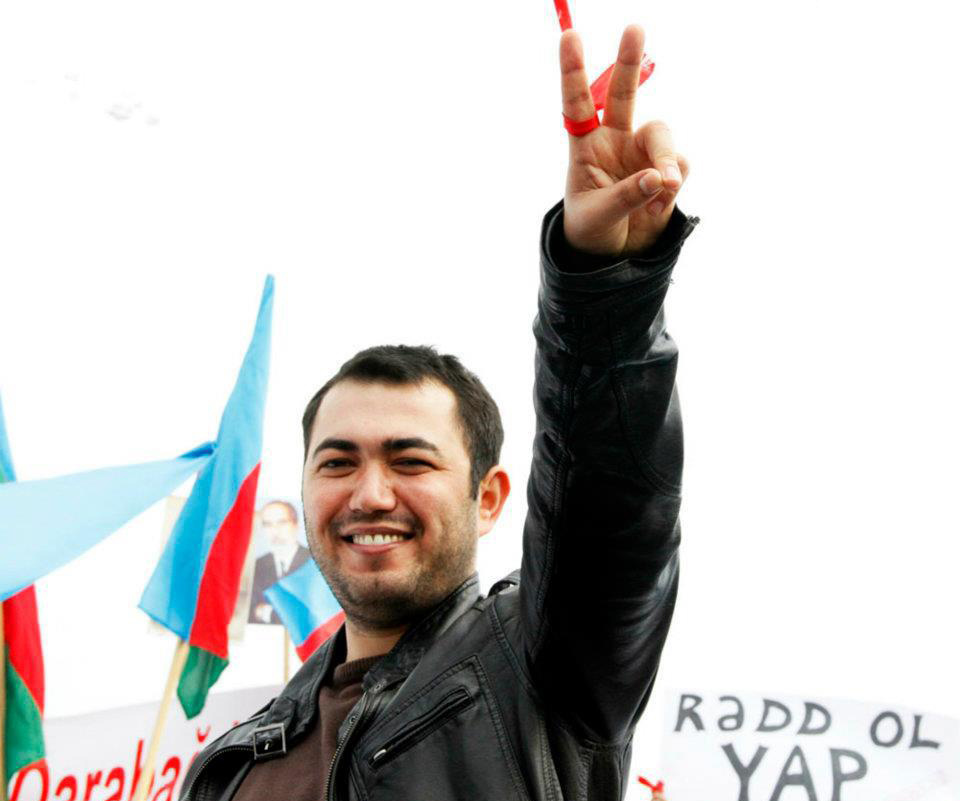
- Born: 7 August 1984 (age 42); Beylagan, Azerbaijan SSR, Soviet Union
- Education: Azerbaijan State Economic University; Central European University

Rashadat Fikrat oglu Akhundov (Azerbaijani: Rəşadət Fikrət oğlu Axundov, born on August 7, 1984, Beylagan) is a youth activist and co-founder of N!DA Civic Movement. He was arrested on March 30, 2013 a few days after the protests held in Baku against the non-combat deaths in the military. Akhundov was accused in preparing the riots during the protests. International human rights organization, Amnesty International recognized him as a prisoner of conscience. He was sentenced to 8 years of imprisonment on May 6, 2014, but later pardoned and released on March 17, 2016 being imprisoned for three years.

== Education ==
Akhundov has graduated from Ali-Bayramli Private Turkish High School in 2001. Thereafter, he studied BSc in International Economic Relations at Azerbaijan State Economic University where he was in the special talents group specializing in finance and accounting. After successfully completing his bachelor studies in Baku, he headed to Budapest in order to do his master. Akhundov graduated from CEU Business School and obtained Master of Business Administration degree in 2007.

== Activity ==
In early years of his activism Akhundov joined Yox! Movement in 2005 and was one of the leading members. Then starting from 2006 he continued his activity in OL! Azerbaijani Youth Movement. He even managed to become a member of the board for a period of time. Akhundov's activity in OL! ended up in 2010. At the same time, he was one of the founders of the Youth Rights Protection Movement initiated to protect youth activists Adnan Hajizadeh and Emin Milli whose arrest was politically motivated. He was detained for a few days for several times due to his active participation in the street protests in 2010 and 2011.

Akhundov is a co-founder of Nida Civic Movement and was one out of seven board members when he was arrested in March 2013.

== Personal life ==
He is married and has a son who was born after his arrest in 2013. Akhundov used to work for BP as a finance analyst in Baku.

== See also ==
- Nida Civic Movement
- Zaur Gurbanli
- Rashad Hasanov
- Uzeyir Mammadli
