= Azer =

Azer may refer to:

- Azer (name)
- Azer (language)
- Azer (Dungeons & Dragons), a race from a plane of fire in Dungeons & Dragons
- AZER, the reporting mark for the Arizona Eastern Railway, a Class III railroad in the southwestern United States

== See also ==
- Azerbaijan (disambiguation)
- Azerbaijani (disambiguation)
