= Anarchism in Azerbaijan =

Anarchism is a small minority political movement in Azerbaijan, although it has unique roots.

== History ==
Anarchists first appeared in 1904 around the suburbs of Baku. The peak of activism was around 1906–1907, when the number of anarchist organizations in Azerbaijan rose to 40. However, there were few members according to local authorities.

== Organizations ==
The most influential organizations were established in 1905 by anarcho-communists called Anarkhiya (anarchy), hailing from the city center, and Borba (struggle) in Bibi Eybat. At the same time several groups formed including Bunt in Balakhany and The Internationale in Black City. During the formation of Anarchy, it included several social democrats working in Baku factories. On 1 July 1906 a faction of Anarchy organized into a new group which adopted the name Krasnaya sotnya (Red Hundred). These "red-hundreders" explained their choice by criticism of office bureaucracy of Anarchy, as well as their commitment to effective methods of struggle. Later many small anarchist groups formed, including the Individualist Anarchists, Black Crow, Anarchist Bombers, Red Flag, Terror, Land and Freedom, Azad (free) and others.

=== Demographic background ===
According to police reports, the national composition of anarchist organizations were exclusively Russian (except Azad). However, many organizations included a large number of Armenians who were former Hunchakian, Dashnak, who broke with their party. Anarchist Jews—former Social Democrats—chose terrorist methods of struggle and acted mostly against Zionist organizations. The group Red Hundred also included eight Georgians. The average age in these organizations was 28–30 years (the youngest was 19 years old, and the oldest 35).

=== Anarkhiya ===
"Anarkhiya" was founded by former Hunchakian S. Kalashyants who issued a pamphlet named "To Struggle and Anarchy" early in 1906. He was killed on 5 September 1906 by dashnaks as revenge for the murder of I. Dolukhanov, a wealthy dashnak factory owner.

=== Azad ===
Azad was founded in 1906 and was considered the largest of the then existing small groups like Riot and Terror. They had 15 members at their peak, including former gang members who became local anarchists. The group was led by 2 brothers, Aga Karim and Aga Sanguli. Azad feuded with local millionaires, which were headed by Teimur Ashurbekov (grandfather of Sara Ashurbeyli). At the end of 1907, Karim Aga and Ashurbekov both were arrested, Azad dissolved and remaining members joined other groups.

== Ideological differences ==
Anarchists of Baku mostly consisted of two separate ideological subdivisions:

- Anarcho-communists: "Anarchy", "Black Crow", "Azad", "Red Hundred", "Red Flag", "Bunt", "Land and Freedom", "The Internationale"
- Anarcho-individualists: "Terror", "Anarchist Bombers", "Individualist Anarchists" and "Baku society of terrorists and anarchist individualists" (founded by P.F.Kalinin in 1906, 1 May)

== Aftermath ==
Anarchist organizations lost many followers because of their brutal methods of fighting against the system, including murders and bombings. In March 1908, 50 members of the Red hundred were arrested and sentenced to exile in Siberia. In 1909, almost all members of Black Crow, Terror, and Red Flag were arrested. The remaining small groups disbanded themselves. After the mass repressions of 1908–1909, the anarchist movement in Azerbaijan has failed to recover.

== Current situation ==
In February 2013, the Baku Individual Anarchists Association (BIAA) was founded by three Azeri. Group considers itself successor to the Baku society of terrorists and anarchist individualists, which was founded by P. F. Kalinin, and considers itself the oldest functioning non-governmental organization in the history of Azerbaijan.

On May 9, 2016, the eve of the birthday of Heydar Aliyev, graffiti reading "Happy holiday of slaves!" and "Fuck the system!" appeared on the pedestal of a monument to Aliyev in Baku, complete with a circle-A inscription. The next day, the Azerbaijani anarchists Bayram Mammadov and Giyas Ibrahimov were detained by police for allegedly perpetrating the graffiti. During the arrest, heroin was apparently seized from their apartments and the pair were arrested for 4 months, pending trial, with the court investigating allegations of the police use of torture against the detainees. The pair were sentenced to 10 years in prison on charges of drug trafficking, although they were later released in March 2019, following an amnesty granted for nearly 400 political prisoners.

On September 27, 2020, Giyas Ibrahimov was again detained by the State Security Service for having made anti-war statements on social media, saying “Pseudo-patriots say they want war now to prevent the conflict from being passed on to future generations. They do not see that they do not allow the next generation to come.“ - in reference to the deaths of schoolchildren during the 2020 Nagorno-Karabakh war.

On May 4, 2021, Bayram Mammadov was found dead in Istanbul, he had allegedly entered the sea at Moda beach two days before and was reported not to have left again. Despite an official investigation not being initiated, state news outlets reported the death as a suicide, but close friends of Mammadov have disputed the reports. In July 2021, it was uncovered that Bayram Mammadov, his father, and Giyas Ibrahimov's mother had all been targeted for surveillance by the Azerbaijani government, using the Pegasus spyware developed by the Israeli NSO Group.

== See also ==
- List of anarchist movements by region
- Anarchism in Armenia
- Anarchism in Iran
- Anarchism in Russia
