= Salim Muslumov =

Azerbaijani politician

Salim Muslumov Səlim Müslümov
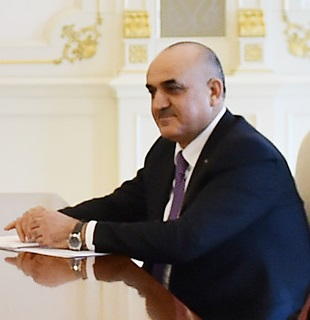
- Azerbaijani politician, 2018

Minister of Labour and Social Protection of the Population of Azerbaijan Republic
- In office 22 October 2013 – 21 April 2018
- President: Ilham Aliyev
- Preceded by: Fizuli Alakbarov
- Succeeded by: Sahil Babayev

Chairman of the State Social Protection Fund of Azerbaijan Republic
- In office 17 December 2002 – 22 October 2013
- President: Ilham Aliyev
- Preceded by: Avaz Alakbarov
- Succeeded by: Elman Mehdiyev

Personal details
- Born: 1 November 1961 (age 64) Pirhasanli village of Agsu Rayon of Azerbaijan

Salim Muslumov Yanvar oglu (Azerbaijani: Səlim Müslümov Yanvar oğlu; born 1 November 1961) Azerbaijani politician who served as the Minister of Labour and Social Protection of the Population (2013-2018) and the Chairman of the State Social Protection Fund of Azerbaijan Republic (2002-2013).

He was detained in February 2021 due to an ongoing investigation on state corruption.

== Early life ==
Muslumov was born on 1 November 1961 in Pirhasanli village of Agsu Rayon of Azerbaijan. In 1983, he graduated from the Azerbaijan State Economic University cum laude. From 1983 to 1987 he continued his doctoral studies at Moscow State University. In November 1987, he obtained a PhD in Economics. From January 1988 until July 1995, Muslumov worked as professor and assistant dean at Azerbaijan State Economic University. From 1992 through 1995, he was also on research fellowship at Marmara University in Turkey. Starting from July 1995, he was a department director at the Ministry of Finance of Azerbaijan Republic.

== Political career ==
In March 2000, Muslumov was appointed Deputy Chairman of the State Customs Committee. On 17 January 2002 he was conferred the rank of General Major of the Customs. According to the Presidential Decree, he was appointed the Chairman of the State Social Protection Fund of Azerbaijan Republic on 17 December 2002. During the General Assembly of the International Social Security Association held on 18 September 2004 he was elected member of bureau. He's an author of several legislative documents on economic policies which were then passed into law. Muslumov has authored 4 books and more than 50 publications.

== See also ==
- Cabinet of Azerbaijan
- Economy of Azerbaijan
