= Ilhama Gadimova =

Azerbaijani jurist (born 1975)

Deputy Minister of Agriculture of the Republic of Azerbaijan
- Incumbent
- Assumed office 2018
- President: Ilham Aliyev

Personal details
- Born: 1975 (age 50–51) Baku, Azerbaijan SSR, Soviet Union
- Spouse: Married
- Children: 2
- Education: Ankara University, Marmara University
- Occupation: Lawyer
- Profession: Doctor of Philosophy in Law
- Website: Ministry of Agriculture of the Republic of Azerbaijan

Ilhama Novruz gizi Gadimova (born 1975, Baku, Azerbaijan SSR) is an Azerbaijani lawyer with a PhD in Law, a specialist in the field of legal reforms, a researcher in the field of state law and criminal law, and Deputy Minister of Agriculture of the Republic of Azerbaijan. She actively participated in the preparation and implementation of the legal bases for the "ASAN service", "ASAN service index" evaluation, "Agrarian insurance" applications, and the creation of the legal bases for the unified management of state information systems and resources, and the Electronic Agricultural Information System.

== Life and education ==
Ilhama Gadimova graduated from the physics, mathematics, and information technology-oriented test class of Baku School No. 183 in 1992. From 1992 to 1993, she studied Turkish and legal Turkish at the Turkish Language Teaching Center of Ankara University. In 1993–1997, she studied a Bachelor of Laws at the Law Faculties of Ankara and Marmara Universities in the Republic of Turkey based on an intergovernmental agreement.

In 1998–2001, she completed a master's degree in public law at the Institute of Social Sciences of Marmara University and her thesis on "The Azerbaijani Example in the Restructuring of the USSR". In 2002–2009, she completed her doctoral studies in criminal law and defended her thesis on "The Purpose of Punishment and Types of Punishment in the Criminal Law of the USSR, Azerbaijan, and Turkey".

== Scientific and Professional Life ==
As a lawyer-scientist, Gadimova focused her activities on the applied aspects of legal science, especially on the development of a legal state, administrative reforms, and the improvement of legal mechanisms in the field of serving citizens.

In the 2000s, she worked as a lawyer and legal consultant in the private sector in Turkey and Azerbaijan.

In 2010–2012, she worked as a specialist in the areas of expertise of legal acts, preparation of the legal regulatory framework, legal support, and monitoring at the Civil Service Commission under the President of the Republic of Azerbaijan.

In 2012–2018, she participated in the formation of the “ASAN service” system, a well-known social innovation of the Republic of Azerbaijan, and was responsible for the preparation, application, and control of legal acts together with the legal team she led in this direction.

She was an active participant in the establishment and implementation of the mechanism for evaluating public services based on the “ASAN service” index, together with the State Services Registry and ADA University specialists.

In 2018, she was appointed deputy minister of agriculture, participated in the reforms implemented in the agrarian sector, and led the process of creating the legal concept and management model of these reforms, as well as the Electronic Agricultural Information System (EKTIS).

In 2019, he was an active participant in the preparation of the Law of the Republic of Azerbaijan “On Agricultural Insurance” for the formation, implementation, and delivery of agricultural insurance to citizens in the country, and the improvement and implementation of the new model in the country through international cooperation in this field.

=== Academic Activity ===
In 2014–2018, she taught Constitutional Law, Administrative Law, and International Law at the Faculty of Economics of the Turkic World at Azerbaijan State University of Economics (TUDIFAK). Her pedagogical activity is aimed at training new personnel in the field of law. During his activity, she managed to prepare a course program on "Administrative Law", of which she was the author, and it was approved by the decision of the Educational and Methodological Council of the Azerbaijan State University of Economics dated January 22, 2016.

Other Activities

In 2024, she served as a member of the organizing committee of the UN COP29 Conference on Climate Change. In the same year, she participated in the formulation, promotion, and implementation of the "Baku Harmony for Farmers Initiative", one of the initiatives put forward by Azerbaijan within the framework of the COP 29 events.

== Awards ==
- "10th Anniversary of ASAN Service" Jubilee Medal of the Republic of Azerbaijan (2023)
- "25th Anniversary of the Mine Cleaning Agency of the Republic of Azerbaijan" Jubilee Medal (2023)
- "100th Anniversary of Heydar Aliyev (1923–2023)" Jubilee Medal (2024)
