= Adhari =

Adhari may be:

- a common name of the extinct Old Azeri language
- an alternative romanisation of the word Azari

== See also ==
- Adhari Park, in Bahrain
