= Alakbarov =

Alakbarov (masculine, Azerbaijani: Ələkbərov) or Alakbarova (feminine, Azerbaijani: Ələkbərova) is an Azerbaijani surname, which is transliterated in Russian as Alekperov (Russian: Алекперов, masculine) and Alekperova (feminine). Notable people with the surname include:

- Alasgar Alakbarov (1910–1963), Azerbaijani actor
- Avaz Alakbarov (born 1952), Azerbaijani politician
- Fizuli Alakbarov (born 1958), Azerbaijani politician
- Letafet Alekperova (born 1976), Azerbaijani television host and actress
- Samir Alakbarov (born 1968), Azerbaijani footballer
- Shovkat Alakbarova (1922–1993), Azerbaijani singer
- Vagit Alekperov (born 1950), Azerbaijani and Russian businessman
- Vugar Alakbarov (born 1981), Azerbaijani boxer
