= Azerbaijan Province =

Azerbaijan Province may refer to:

- West Azerbaijan province, Iran
- East Azerbaijan province, Iran
- Islamic State – Azerbaijan Province
- Azerbaijan province (Safavid Iran)

== See also ==
- Azerbaijan (disambiguation)
