= Forum of Azerbaijani Students in Europe =

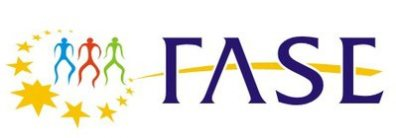
- Logo of FASE
- Formation: May 2006
- Type: Network for Azerbaijani students in Europe
- Headquarters: Brussels
- Location: Europe
- Official language: English, Azeri
- Website: www.myfase.org

Forum of Azerbaijani Students in Europe or FASE (Azerbaijani: Azərbaycanlı Tələbələrin Avropa Forumu) is a government sponsored organization for Azerbaijani students and young professionals in Europe. It has been sponsored by the government of Azerbaijan to promote national interests. It launched ANTV, which has been touted as a citizen journalist station. The station is affiliated with the Alumni Network Youth Organisation and was started by Emin Milli Chairman of Alumni Network (AN) Youth Organisation.
