= Uzeyir Mammadli =

Azerbaijani human rights activist (born 1987)

- Üzeyir Məmmədli
- Born: 26 August 1987; Barda, Azerbaijan
- Education: Baku State University

Uzeyir Mahammad oglu Mammadli (Azerbaijani: Üzeyir Məhəmməd oğlu Məmmədli; born August 26, 1987, in Barda) is a youth activist and co-founder of N!DA Civic Movement. He is known for his arrest on March 30, 2013, a few days after the protests held in Baku against the non-combat deaths in the military. Mammadli is accused of preparing the riots during the protests. International human rights organization, Amnesty International recognized him as a prisoner of conscience. He was sentenced to 7 years of imprisonment on May 6, 2014, but later was pardoned and released on December 30, 2014, after 1 year 9 months imprisonment.

== Education ==
In 2004, Mammadli graduated from a state secondary school located in Mollalı village in Barda where he was born and raised. In the same year, he moved to Baku to continue his education. He gained a B.Sc. in Law degree from Baku State University in 2008. Mammadli completed his one-year compulsory military service in July 2009.

== Activity ==
Uzeyir Mammadli is one of the young people who participated in the establishment of Nida Civic Movement. He was elected to the board of the movement for several times. At the same time, he was a representative of N!DA in the Committee for Protection of Youth Rights.

== See also ==
- Nida Civic Movement
- Rashadat Akhundov
- Zaur Gurbanli
- Rashad Hasanov
