= Gurbanli =

Gurbanli is a surname. Notable people with the surname include:

- Aisha Gurbanli (born 1993), Azerbaijani judoka
- Asiman Gurbanli (born 1992), Azerbaijani karateka
- Mubariz Gurbanli, Azerbaijani politician
- Orkhan Gurbanli (born 1995), Azerbaijani footballer
- Zaur Gurbanli (born 1987), Azerbaijani youth activist
