= Giyas Ibrahim =

- Qiyas İbrahim
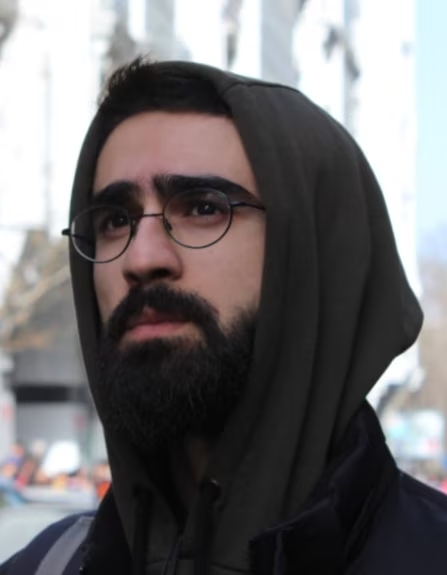
- Giyas Ibrahim in 2020
- Born: August 3, 1994 (age 31); Tovuz District, Azerbaijan
- Citizenship: Azerbaijan
- Education: Baku Slavic University (B)
- Occupations: Civil and political activist, former political prisoner
- Years active: 2016–present
- Organization: Nida Civic Movement (2016–2019)
- Awards: Nargiz Award (2016)

Giyas Ibrahim (full name: Giyas Hasan oglu Ibrahim, Azerbaijani: Qiyas Həsən oğlu İbrahimov; born August 3, 1994, Tovuz District, Azerbaijan) is an Azerbaijani civil and political activist, former political prisoner, and former member of the "NIDA" Civic Movement (2016–2019).

== Background ==
Giyas Ibrahimov and Bayram Mammadov were abducted by police from the street early in the morning on May 10, 2016, after writing the slogans "Happy Slave Holiday!" (Azerbaijani: Qul Bayramınız Mübarəк!) and "Fucк the System" on the pedestal of a monument erected in honor of Heydar Aliyev, the former President of Azerbaijan (1993–2003) and father of the current president, Ilham Aliyev, during the night of May 9–10, 2016. Since 2000, Azerbaijan has celebrated the Flower Festival on May 10, dedicated to the birthday of the country's former president. Giyas and Bayram played on the phrase "Gül bayramınız mübarəк!" ("Happy Flower Festival!") by changing the first letter of the first word. The result was "Qul bayramınız mübarəк!" — "Happy Slave Holiday!".

After being subjected to torture and ill-treatment, criminal proceedings were initiated against them, and they were arrested under Articles 234.4.1 and 234.4.3 of the Criminal Code of Azerbaijan (illegal sale of narcotic or psychotropic substances committed by a group of persons by prior conspiracy or by an organized group and on a large scale). Official claims that the young men, coming from poor families, had acquired such a large quantity of drugs were met with skepticism by the public. Discussions in local media, social networks, statements by their lawyers, as well as declarations by local and international organizations regarding the arrests, asserted that the charges were fabricated and the prosecution politically motivated.

Following their detention, Bayram Mammadov and Giyas Ibrahimov were subjected to torture and inhuman treatment both at the Main Police Department of Baku City and at the Narimanov District Police Department.

A number of international human rights organizations described the arrests as politically motivated. Amnesty International declared both young men "prisoners of conscience." On October 25, 2016, the Baku Court for Grave Crimes sentenced Giyas Ibrahimov to 10 years of imprisonment. In December 2017, an additional criminal case was initiated against Giyas Ibrahimov under Article 289.2 of the Criminal Code ("contempt of court"), and his sentence was extended by another three months.

He and Bayram Mammadov were released in March 2019 by presidential decree.

After his release, he continued his political activism and was subjected to persecution and detentions by police in April 2019, as well as in June, September, and October 2020. In July 2023, he was arrested for one month. He is known for his firm anti-Aliyev stance, left-wing ideas, and anti-war views.

== Early years ==
Giyas Hasan oglu Ibrahimov was born on August 3, 1994, in Tovuz.

In 2012, he enrolled at the Baku Slavic University.

At the time of his arrest in May 2016, he was a fourth-year student. He frequently participated in intellectual competitions and received awards.

While in prison, he joined the Nida Civic Movement and remained affiliated with the movement until the end of 2019.

== Graffiti on the Heydar Aliyev monument and arrest (2016) ==
Beginning on the morning of May 10, 2016, photographs showing graffiti on the monument of former Azerbaijani President Heydar Aliyev in central Baku spread across social media and several news portals. The photographs clearly showed the phrases "Happy Slave Holiday!" (Azerbaijani: Qul Bayramınız Mübarəк!) and "Fucк the System" written on the monument's pedestal, along with anarchist symbols painted beside the slogans. Since 2000, Azerbaijan has celebrated the Flower Festival on May 10, dedicated to the birthday of the country's former president. The authors of the graffiti played on the phrase "Gül bayramınız mübarəк!" ("Happy Flower Festival!") by changing the first letter of the first word. The result was "Qul bayramınız mübarəк!" — "Happy Slave Holiday!".

On May 10, reports about the disappearance of two young activists spread on social media and news portals. However, official information was only published on May 11, stating that the two young men, Giyas Ibrahimov and Bayram Mammadov, had been detained on May 10 on charges of drug possession. According to information published on the official website of the Ministry of Internal Affairs: As a result of operational-search measures carried out by the Anti-Narcotics Department of the Main Police Department of Baku City, the 22nd Police Department of the Nasimi District, and the 25th Police Department of the Nizami District, 2.607 grams of heroin were allegedly discovered and confiscated from Giyas Ibrahimov in the Nasimi District, while an additional 1 kilogram and 10 grams of heroin were allegedly found during a search of his apartment. Similarly, as a result of operational-search measures conducted by the Anti-Narcotics Department of the Main Police Department of Baku City and the 12th Police Department of the Sabunchu District, 2.904 grams of heroin were allegedly discovered and confiscated from Bayram Mammadov, a resident of the Sabunchu District, and an additional 1 kilogram and 150 grams of heroin were allegedly found during a search of his home. The official claims that the young men, who came from poor families, possessed such large quantities of narcotics were met with skepticism by the public. Discussions in local media, social networks, statements by their lawyers, and declarations by both local and international organizations concerning the arrests asserted that the charges were fabricated and that the criminal prosecution was politically motivated.

=== Torture and inhuman treatment ===
On May 12, by the decision of Judge Ibrahim Ibrahimli of the Khatai District Court of Baku, activists Giyas Ibrahimov and Bayram Mammadov were placed in pretrial detention for four months. According to lawyer Elchin Sadigov, Bayram Mammadov and Giyas Ibrahimov were subjected to torture and inhuman treatment after their detention. They were first taken to the Main Police Department of Baku City and then to the Narimanov District Police Department. Both young men were tortured there. According to the lawyer, the detainees were demanded to apologize to the Heydar Aliyev monument – they were told: "Apologize to the Aliyev monument on camera, and then we will release you." The lawyer added that under torture they were forced to sign documents confessing to possession of "drugs."

On May 16, lawyer Elchin Sadigov met with Bayram Mammadov and Giyas Ibrahimov at the Baku Pretrial Detention Center. He stated that traces of torture were still visible on the bodies of the young men and demanded that representatives of the International Committee of the Red Cross (ICRC) visit them immediately. In an interview with Voice of America, Sadigov stated: "Giyas Ibrahimov suffered from severe headaches, and the areas where he had been beaten were painful. It appeared that Giyas was in poor condition. The physical injuries were especially visible on Bayram Mammadov. He had closed and open wounds on his wrists, knees, body, and legs."

On May 19, the Turan Information Agency published an extensive article about the detention of Giyas Ibrahimov and the torture he allegedly endured in various police stations. Although Giyas Ibrahimov initially wrote the article himself, staff at the Baku Pretrial Detention Center confiscated the pages, stating that "writing about torture is prohibited." For this reason, lawyer Elchin Sadigov met with Giyas Ibrahimov, recorded the events of May 10 and the following days, and presented them to the public. "On May 10, 2016, around noon, I was leaving the second building of Baku Slavic University after an exam. I was about six meters from the exit when I was struck hard on the back of the head. I staggered from the blow, immediately felt a second strike, and fell face down. I was quickly lifted and forced into a blue car. There were men in civilian clothes on both sides of me and in the front seat beside the driver. They started beating and insulting me, complaining that I had written slogans on the monument," Ibrahimov stated. He was taken to the Main Police Department of Baku City, locked in a large room, and beaten again. "They mainly hit me on the head and the back of my neck with their palms. I started losing consciousness from the blows. They handcuffed my hands behind my back. They said they had brought two witnesses and that they would now ‘find drugs’ on me in front of them. They pulled something from the left pocket of my jacket and said it was drugs. I told them it was not mine and that they had put it in my pocket while I was unconscious. At that moment they started beating me again. The pain was unbearable," Ibrahimov continued. At the same time, Bayram Mammadov was allegedly being beaten in another room. When Giyas shouted and tried to call out to Bayram, his mouth was covered, his head twisted, and he was punched in the stomach. "They began beating me again and demanded that I apologize to the monument, lay flowers there, and allow Azerbaijan Television (AzTV) to come and film it. I refused. They demanded that I confess to drug-related crimes. When I refused, they beat me again. They pulled down my trousers and approached me with a baton, saying they would act immorally. I was forced to confess to false drug charges. Then they said they would go to our house, find drugs there, and that I would have to confess. I said I would not confess. They said that if I refused, they would arrest my parents," Ibrahimov wrote. During the search of his home, police allegedly placed drugs under his mother's bed and then stated: "Here they are, we found them." “On the way back they began beating me again, then grabbed me by the hair and spat in my face. After I was brought back to the Main Police Department of Baku City, I was beaten again and forced to write a confession claiming that I had purchased drugs from an Iranian citizen," Ibrahimov stated. According to his account, the beatings continued in the presence of the head of the Main Police Department of Baku City, Police Major General Mirgafar Seyidov. Ibrahimov was then taken to the temporary detention facility of the Narimanov District Police Department. There, he was allegedly forced to sweep the yard and collect cigarette butts. "They insulted me and recorded it on their phones. This continued the entire time I was there," Ibrahimov noted. On May 12, lawyer Elchin Sadigov witnessed events at the Narimanov police station, and after protesting, he was forcibly removed from the department.

No forensic medical examination regarding the torture allegedly inflicted on Giyas Ibrahimov was ordered. On May 19, the Office of the Ombudsman issued a statement saying that members of the National Preventive Group (NPG) had privately met with defendants Bayram Mammadov and Giyas Ibrahimov at the Baku Pretrial Detention Center. According to the statement, their bodies were examined in the presence of an NPG doctor, and no injuries were found.

=== Trial proceedings (May–October 2016) ===
On May 12, by the decision of Judge Ibrahim Ibrahimli of the Khatai District Court of Baku, activists Giyas Ibrahimov and Bayram Mammadov were placed in pretrial detention for four months. On May 19, the Baku Court of Appeal rejected the appeal against the decision of the Khatai District Court to place Giyas Ibrahimov in pretrial detention. On May 20, another court hearing was held at the Khatai District Court under the chairmanship of Judge Bakhtiyar Mammadov. During the hearing, the court rejected the lawyer's motion to place Giyas Ibrahimov under house arrest. On May 26, the Baku Court of Appeal reviewed the appeal against the decision not to place Giyas Ibrahimov under house arrest. The court dismissed the appeal.

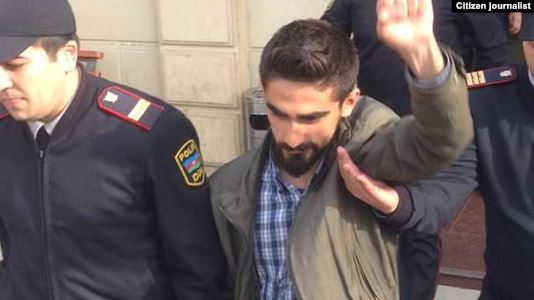
Giyas Ibrahimov being escorted to the Khatai District Court (May 12, 2016)

On August 19, the preliminary investigation into the criminal case against Giyas Ibrahimov was completed, and the case was transferred to the Baku Court for Grave Crimes for consideration.

On September 8, during a preparatory hearing at the Baku Court for Grave Crimes chaired by Judge Anvar Seyidov, Giyas Ibrahimov's personal details were clarified. Later, the court announced the extension of the preventive detention measure imposed on him.

On September 20, the preparatory hearing continued. Lawyer Elchin Sadigov filed motions requesting the termination of the criminal case, the replacement of the preventive detention measure with house arrest, and the questioning of Q. Ibrahimov's mother as an additional witness. Judge Anvar Seyidov granted only the third motion and rejected the other two.

On September 27, at a court hearing, the prosecutor announced the indictment. Later, Giyas Ibrahimov gave testimony in court. He stated that he did not plead guilty to the drug-related charges and claimed he had been framed for writing the slogan "Happy Slave Holiday!" (Azerbaijani: Qul Bayramınız Mübarəк!) on the pedestal of the monument to former President Heydar Aliyev. "From the moment of my arrest, police officers only asked me why I had written on the monument. For that, they insulted me, beat me, and accused me of a crime I did not commit. They even threatened to rape me with a baton," Ibrahimov added. According to Giyas Ibrahimov, after he was forced to write and sign a statement under torture, he was taken to the office of the head of the Main Police Department of Baku City, Police Major General Mirgafar Seyidov: "My hands were handcuffed. Mirgafar Seyidov said: ‘No one sits in front of me; they kneel.’ I asked: ‘Why should I kneel?’ At that moment, a police officer named Parviz kicked me while my hands were still cuffed, and I fell. Mirgafar Seyidov said: ‘You are useless people for this country, you are enemies, we will beat you as much as we can.’" Later, police officers from the Main Police Department of Baku City, Parviz Mammadov and Elvin Kazimov, were questioned as witnesses. They gave similar testimony, stating that the department had received operational information about Giyas Ibrahimov's involvement in drug trafficking, and based on that information, an operation was carried out and he was arrested. The police confirmed that the activist had not been tortured and that he had voluntarily admitted the drugs belonged to him. They stated that he confessed willingly.

The next court hearing took place on September 29. During the session, police officers and witnesses gave testimony. Police officer Beylar Naghiyev stated that they had received information about Giyas Ibrahimov acquiring and transporting narcotics and conducted an operation based on that information. He further claimed that after Ibrahimov was detained and brought to the police station, he voluntarily handed over the drugs he had been carrying. According to the witness testimony, after Giyas Ibrahimov was brought to the station, a lawyer and witnesses were also summoned. Lawyer Elchin Sadigov stated that lawyer offices are already closed by 6:00 pm, and asked the witness where they had found a lawyer at that time. Beylar Naghiyev did not respond to the question. Giyas Ibrahimov stated that he did not see this person at all during his arrest. Later, other police officers, Chingiz Alisafarov and Rufat Agharzayev, gave similar testimony. According to Elchin Sadigov, there were significant contradictions in their statements, indicating multiple legal violations. During the same hearing, witnesses Mubariz Aliyev and Intigam Musayev also testified. Witness Intigam Musaev stated that he could not read or write in the Latin alphabet and that he had not read the protocols at all, but simply signed them.

The final witnesses were questioned at the court hearing held on October 4. Police officer Seyran Lutfaliyev testified that Giyas Ibrahimov himself had told them that he was selling drugs. At that moment, lawyer Elchin Sadigov asked Giyas Ibrahimov whether he knew Lutfaliyev, and Ibrahimov replied: "When we went to the house for the search—or rather to plant drugs—this man was holding my left hand. He told me to behave calmly and not to let them take weapons out of the house along with the drugs. Later, another police officer, Imran Aliyev from the Main Police Department of Baku City, also confirmed Lutfaliyev’s statements. Lawyer Elchin Sadigov asked the witness how he recognized Giyas Ibrahimov and how he approached him. Imran Aliyev replied: “We were told he was a bearded guy and that we needed to catch him. I had never seen his photo." Finally, Shura Amiraslanova, Giyas Ibrahimov's mother, gave testimony as a witness: "The door opened, and 5–6 people came in and asked if I was Giyas’s mother. As soon as I said yes, about 15 people entered. They were shouting. At one point, a policeman said: ‘Calm down, there is a woman in the house.’ Giyas came up to me and said: ‘Don’t be afraid, mom, they want to arrest me for drug use because of my political activity.’ I had just made the bed. When the police opened the refrigerator, I said: ‘You placed drugs on the bed. The mattress was on top before, and now it is in the middle.’" Amiraslanova stated that she did not hear from her son for three days after his arrest.

At the hearing held on October 21, the court declared the investigation completed, and the prosecutor delivered the closing statement. The prosecutor requested that Giyas Ibrahimov be sentenced to nine years of imprisonment.

On October 25, the final court hearing took place. During the session, Giyas Ibrahimov delivered his closing statement. "I do not intend to defend myself against the charges of drug possession. Like everyone else, with or without conscience, you know why I am here and why you will deliver a verdict," he told Judge Anvar Seyidov. Giyas Ibrahimov stated that the real reason for the charges was his protest against what he described as the lies of the current system in a civilized manner, in the spirit of an ordinary student and young person: "I expressed my protest through the slogans I wrote on the monument of Heydar Aliyev. My protest was aimed at refusing to accept the system’s lies as truth," he said. He further stated that protesting injustice by writing slogans on a monument should not be considered an insult to the memory of a deceased person: "In the pretrial detention center they said, ‘You have fallen into a deep well.’ Yes, we fell into a well and are trying to find water in it. This water may wash away and cleanse the dirt of the system. We set out on this path with that purpose, and we will not ask for your forgiveness." According to Ibrahimov, after his final words it was clear from the prosecutor's expression that he regretted requesting nine years of imprisonment instead of the maximum sentence for the charges. The court then retired for deliberation. Judge Anvar Seyidov ultimately sentenced Giyas Ibrahimov to 10 years of imprisonment, exceeding the prosecution's request.

According to lawyer Elchin Sadigov, in Azerbaijan the prosecution consistently applies a punitive approach, and even if it is not explicitly prohibited by law, cases in which a judge imposes a sentence exceeding the prosecutor's request are extremely rare. In addition, under Article 127(5) of the Constitution of Azerbaijan, court proceedings in all courts are to be conducted publicly. However, Judge Anvar Seyidov announced the verdict in a closed session. According to human rights defenders, cases in which a court in Azerbaijan sentences a defendant to a term exceeding the prosecutor's request are rarely encountered in the country's judicial history. "This is absurd. It contradicts local legislation, judicial ethics, international law, justice, and truth," said human rights defender and Andrei Sakharov Freedom Award laureate Intigam Aliyev.

Immediately after the verdict was delivered, Human Rights Watch called for the immediate and unconditional release of Giyas Ibrahimov, while Amnesty International described the sentence imposed on him as a "complete travesty of justice."

=== Reaction to imprisonment and release ===
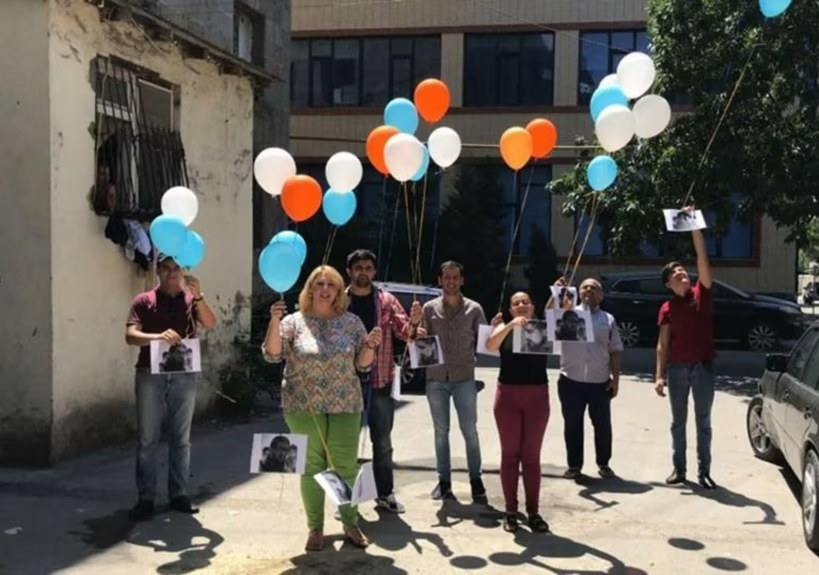
A flash mob was organized in honor of Giyas Ibrahim's 23rd birthday, which he marked in prison (2017)

In a statement published on May 11, the Nida Civic Movement reported that both young men had been detained for writing protest slogans on the pedestal of the Heydar Aliyev monument on May 10. The NIDA Civic Movement demanded the immediate release of its member Bayram Mammadov, as well as political activist Giyas Ibrahimov. On May 12, the international human rights organization Freedom House issued a statement condemning the arrests of Bayram Mammadov and Giyas Ibrahimov. "The two young men who wrote slogans on the pedestal of the monument to former President Heydar Aliyev are being charged with drug trafficking. Democratic countries should demand that Azerbaijan respect fundamental freedoms and allow civil society to function freely," the statement said. Human Rights Watch noted in its statement that Azerbaijani authorities had "responded" to the slogans written on the Heydar Aliyev monument in Baku by fabricating drug possession charges to prosecute the two young activists. The organization added that Azerbaijani authorities should immediately release them and investigate reports of severe torture of the activists in police custody. Another international human rights organization, Amnesty International, stated that the criminal charges against Bayram Mammadov and Giyas Ibrahimov appeared politically motivated and based on fabricated evidence. The organization called for their injuries to be examined and documented by independent forensic experts and urged the authorities to conduct an effective and impartial investigation into the allegations of false charges and ill-treatment. On June 2, Amnesty International declared Bayram Mammadov and Giyas Ibrahimov "prisoners of conscience" and called for their release. On May 18, the Council of Europe Commissioner for Human Rights, Nils Muižnieks, condemned the violence against Giyas Ibrahimov and Bayram Mammadov.

On May 19, a group of activists staged a protest in front of the Azerbaijani Embassy in Berlin. The protesters expressed concern over the torture of the detained youth activists Bayram Mammadov and Giyas Ibrahimov and demanded their release. Posters featuring Bayram and Giyas were also displayed at Azerbaijani embassies in Berlin, Paris, Amsterdam, Brussels, and Ankara.

In December, U.S. State Department spokesperson John Kirby issued a statement regarding the arrests of Bayram Mammadov and Giyas Ibrahimov. The statement read: "The United States is concerned that Azerbaijani courts sentenced Bayram Mammadov and Giyas Ibrahimov to 10 years in prison on drug charges that are widely considered politically motivated. We are also concerned about allegations of their mistreatment in custody. We urge the Government of Azerbaijan to release Mr. Mammadov, Mr. Ibrahimov, and others detained for exercising their fundamental freedoms." The European Union also issued a statement calling for a review of the cases of Bayram Mammadov and Giyas Ibrahimov. Daniel B. Baer, the U.S. Ambassador to the OSCE, described Ibrahimov's arrest as "unjust."

Ali Karimli, Chairman of the Azerbaijan Popular Front Party, stated that the arrest of Giyas Ibrahimov and Bayram Mammadov would have a "boomerang effect" on the government itself. According to him, thanks to Bayram and Giyas, countless monuments of Heydar Aliyev and the myth of imposed idolization in Azerbaijan were "destroyed." Arif Hajili, Chairman of the Musavat Party, described the 10-year sentence as a continuation of government repression. Isa Gambar, former Speaker of Parliament, stated that Bayram and Giyas had twice written a "honorable page" in Azerbaijan's struggle for freedom – first by writing the slogan on the monument, and second by delivering a "remarkable final statement" in court.

On January 17, 2019, the European Parliament adopted a resolution titled "The Case of Mehman Huseynov in Azerbaijan," which was supported by 533 MEPs and opposed by 28. The resolution called for the immediate and unconditional release of several political prisoners, including Giyas Ibrahimov.

== Awards ==
In December 2016, he was awarded the "Nargiz" Prize.

== See also ==
- Bayram Mammadov
