= Rashad Hasanov =

Azerbaijani activist (born 1985)

- Rəşad Həsənov
- Born: 2 May 1985; Lankaran, Azerbaijan
- Education: Middle East Technical University

Rashad Zeynalabdin oglu Hasanov (Azerbaijani: Rəşad Zeynalabdin oğlu Həsənov, born on May 2, 1985, Lankaran) is a youth activist and ex-board member of N!DA Civic Movement from September 2012 to September 2013. He was arrested on March 14, 2013, a few days after the protests held in Baku against the non-combat deaths in the military. Hasanov was accused in preparing the riots during the protests. International human rights organization, Amnesty International recognized him as a prisoner of conscience. He was sentenced to 7 years and 6 months of imprisonment on May 6, 2014, but later pardoned and released on March 17, 2016 being imprisoned for three years.

On February 12, 2017, Rashad Hasanov migrated to Europe. According to him, the reason for his migration was his being forced into collaboration with the State Security Service. On June 7, 2018, the European Court of Human Rights announced a decision on complaints of former members of the NIDA civic movement, Rashad Hasanov, Zaur Gurbanli, Uzeyir Mammadli and Rashadat Akhundov. The ECHR found their arrest in 2013 unlawful, seeing in this violation of the rights under Articles 5.1 (the Right to freedom) and 18 (Restriction of rights for political purposes) of the European Convention on Human Rights.

By the decision of the Plenum of the Supreme Court of the Republic of Azerbaijan dated November 19, 2021, the criminal case on charges under Articles 28, 220.1 and 228.3 of the Criminal Code of the Republic of Azerbaijan was terminated on the grounds of acquittal.

At the moment he is a political refugee in Germany.

== Education ==
Rashad Hasanov is a graduate of Lankaran Private Turkish High School. During his high school years, he took part in the National Mathematics Olympiads and was awarded a gold medal. In 2002, Hasanov has been graduated from the school with an honors diploma.

Hasanov continued his studies at Middle East Technical University (METU) in Turkey. At the same time he led the METU Azerbaijani Students Association with more than 100 members. In 2009–2010, Hasanov was the vice-president of the Azerbaijani Students and Alumni Association of over 300 students.

After his graduation from METU in 2010, Hasanov was admitted into the MA programme in International Security and Terrorism. However, he did not have enough financing to cover his full expenses. Moreover, his request from the Ministry of Education to finance his studies under the State Programme on Education of Azerbaijani Youth Abroad in 2007–2015 was turned down.

== Activity ==
During the Azerbaijani parliamentary election in 2010, Rashad Hasanov actively ran the election campaign for young nominee Bakhtiyar Hajiyev and co-ordinated the work of more than 100 volunteers. Hasanov was one of the members of the Positive Change Youth Movement established on November 10, 2010, by more than 35 volunteers. He was twice elected to the board of the movement between March 2011 and May 2012. He also actively participated in the “Support Bakhtiyar” campaign formed in order to support Bakhtiyar Hajiyev who was that time arrested with political motives.

In 2011, Rashad Hasanov was one of the board members of the Committee for Protection of Youth Rights which has been represented by nine organizations. In May 2012, he left the Positive Change Youth Movement in order to reach a wider audience and joined to N!DA Civic Movement. Starting from September 2012 on, he was the board member of the movement.

In August 2012, he took part in the Forum of Azerbaijanis living in Europe held in Prague, furthermore he was the member of Co-ordination Committee in it.

In October 2012, Rashad Hasanov was one of the responsible people in the inquiry conveyed by “Frontline SMS” programme in “Education without corruption” project, which intended to define the level of bribery at the universities of Azerbaijan with the donation of IREX.

On November 4, 2012, Rashad Hasanov co-founded the Youth Assembly which comprises close to 50 activists.

== See also ==
- Nida Civic Movement
- Rashadat Akhundov
- Zaur Gurbanli
- Uzeyir Mammadli
