= Azer (name) =

Azer may refer to the following people:

Surname:

- Gündüz Gürol Azer (born 1980), Turkish footballer
- Hani Azer (born 1948), Egyptian civil engineer
- Samy Azer, Australian medical educator
- Gerges Azer, Anesthesia Resident in Cleveland Clinic Florida

Given name:

- Azer Aliyev (born 1994), Russian football midfielder
- Azer Amiraslanov (born 1971), Azerbaijani economist
- Azer Bušuladžić (born 1991), Bosnian-Danish footballer
- Azer Bülbül (1967– 2012), Azerbaijani folk singer and actor
- Azer Mammadov (born 1976), Azerbaijani football defender
- Azer Mirzoev (born 1978), Azerbaijani chess player
- Azer Omeragić (born 2002), Macedonian footballer
- Azer Zeynalov (born 1964), Azerbaijani opera singer, film composer and actor
