= Ilkin Rustamzade =

Azerbaijani human rights activist (born 1992)

- İlkin Rüstəmzadə
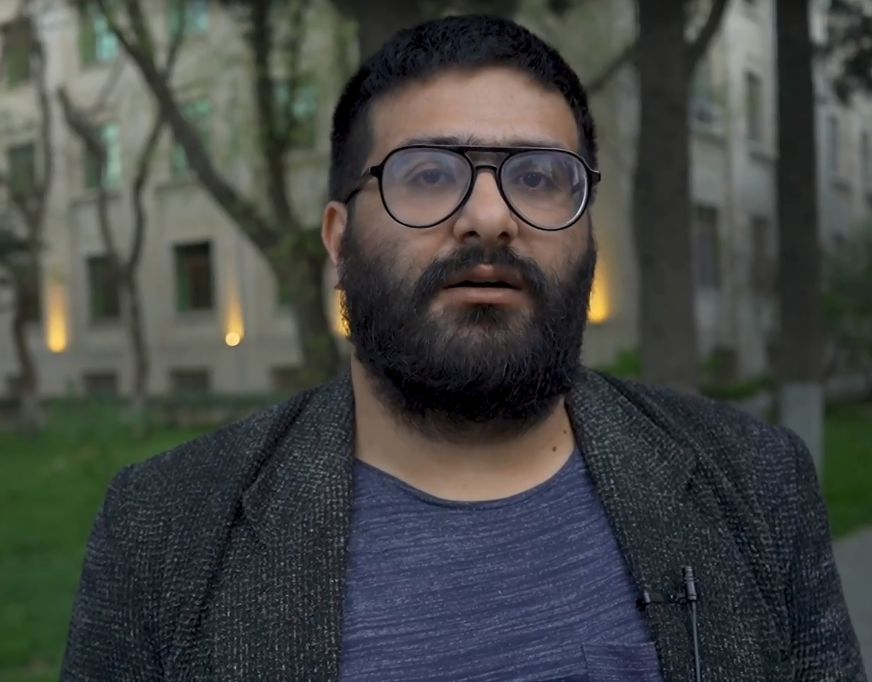
- Rustamzade in April 2022
- Born: 2 August 1992 (age 34); Ganja, Azerbaijan
- Education: Azerbaijan State University of Economics
- Occupation: Human rights activist
- Years active: 2013–2020
- Organization: Nida Civic Movement
- Criminal charges: Threatening national security
- Criminal penalty: Eight years imprisonment
- Criminal status: Released

Ilkin Bakir oglu Rustamzade (Azerbaijani: İlkin Bəkir oğlu Rüstəmzadə; born 2 August 1992) is an Azerbaijani human rights activist, known for being a member of the Nida Civic Movement until 2020. In 2014, he was sentenced to eight years imprisonment and was recognised as a prisoner of conscience by human rights organisations including Amnesty International.

== Early life and education ==
Rustamzade was born on 2 August 1992 in Ganja, Azerbaijan. In 2009, he started studying management at the Azerbaijan State University of Economics in Baku. Rustamzade's studies were interrupted following his arrest in 2013; he ultimately graduated in 2019.

== Activism ==
Rustamzade was a member of the Nida Civic Movement until 2020. He organised protests on 13 January 2013 as part of the "End Soldier Deaths" (Əsgər ölümlərinə son) campaign, following the death of a teenage soldier, Jeyhun Gubadov. On 9 March, the day prior to the planned second "End Soldier Deaths" protest, Rustamzade was arrested and detained alongside seven other members of Nida. They were subsequently charged by the Prosecutor General's Office on 17 May 2024 following a criminal complaint filed by the Ministry of National Security of Azerbaijan. On 6 May 2014, Rustamzade was sentenced to eight years imprisonment, alongside his co-defendants.

Amnesty International subsequently declared Rustamzade as being a prisoner of conscience. On 7 March 2019, the European Court of Human Rights ruled that his ongoing detention was unlawful. On 17 March, Rustamzade was released after receiving a pardon from the President of Azerbaijan, Ilham Aliyev.

Following Rustamzade's release, he was elected to Nida's board of directors following its 2019 election. He was a founding member of the Movement (Hərəkət) bloc in the 2020 Azerbaijani parliamentary elections, and ran as its candidate in the Nizami constituency. Rustamzade's candidacy was subsequently rejected on the grounds that he had previously been convicted with a serious crime under the Criminal Code of Azerbaijan and had been released for less than three years. He appealed the decision, but it was upheld by Central Election Commission and local courts.

On 2 July 2020, Rustamzade announced that he had resigned from the Nida board of directors, and had left the organisation altogether.

== Books ==
Rustamzade has published four books, including a memoir, Yoldaş (lit. 'Companion'), about his friendship with Bayram Mammadov.
