= Azeri =

Azeri or Azeri Turk may refer to:

- Azeri people, an ethnic group also known as Azerbaijanis
- Citizens of Azerbaijan
- Azeri language, the modern-day Turkic language
- Old Azeri, an extinct Iranian language
- Azeri Turk (journal), academic journal
- Azeri (horse), a thoroughbred racehorse
- Azeri oilfield, offshore oil field in the Caspian Sea

== See also ==
- Azari (disambiguation)
- Azerbaijani (disambiguation)
- Azerbaijan (disambiguation)
