= Babagil =

- Location within Azerbaijan
- Coordinates: 38°48′N 48°31′E
- Country: Azerbaijan
- Rayon: Lerik
- Municipality: Günəşli
- Time zone: UTC+4 (AZT)
  - Summer (DST): UTC+5 (AZT)

Babagil (Talysh: Bobogil) is a village in the Lerik Rayon of Azerbaijan. The village forms part of the municipality of Günəşli. The village contains an 18th-century tomb that is registered with the Ministry of Culture and Tourism.
