= Azerbaijan (disambiguation) =

Azerbaijan, officially the Republic of Azerbaijan, is a country in the South Caucasus.

Azerbaijan, Azarbaijan or Azərbaycan may also refer to:

- Azerbaijan (Iran), a historical region in northwestern Iran, where ancient Ātṛpātakāna was located, today spanning three provinces of Iran
- Whole Azerbaijan, irredentist concept of uniting territories into the Republic of Azerbaijan

== Historical entities ==
=== In Iran ===
- Ātṛpātakāna, ancient kingdom (c. 323 BC – 226 AD)
- Adurbadagan, Sasanian province (226–651)
- Azerbaijan province (Safavid Iran), Safavid province (1501–1736)
- Azerbaijan People's Government, a short-lived autonomous state (1945–46)

=== In the South Caucasus ===
- Azerbaijan Democratic Republic, a short-lived state (1918–1920)
- Azerbaijan Soviet Socialist Republic, part of the former Soviet Union (1936–1991)

== Other uses ==
- Günəşli, Lerik, formerly called Azərbaycan, a village in the Republic of Azerbaijan
- Azerbaijan (newspaper), a state-owned newspaper of the Republic of Azerbaijan
- Islamic State – Azerbaijan Province, a branch of the Islamic State.

== See also ==
- Azerbaijan naming controversy
- Azer (disambiguation)
- Azerbaijani (disambiguation)
- Azeri (disambiguation)
