= Bayram Mammadov =

Azerbaijani human rights activist (1995–2021)

- Bayram Məmmədov
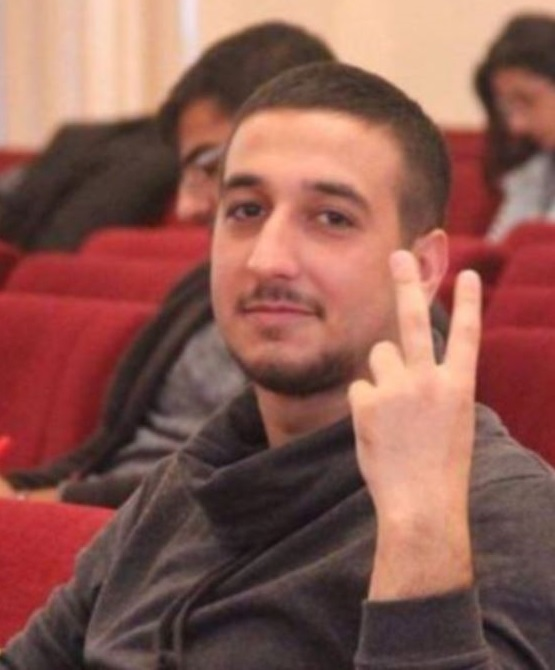
- Mammadov in 2017
- Born: March 1, 1995; Azerbaijan
- Died: May 2, 2021 (aged 26); Istanbul, Turkey
- Occupation: Human rights activist

Bayram Mammadov (Azerbaijani: Bayram Məmmədov; 1 March 1995 – 2 May 2021) was an Azerbaijani human rights activist. A member of the Nida Civic Movement, in 2016 he was sentenced to ten years' imprisonment on drug charges that were widely considered by human rights groups to be fabricated and in response to him having earlier graffitied a statute of Heydar Aliyev, the former President of Azerbaijan.

== Arrest and imprisonment ==
On the evening of 10 May 2016, Mammadov and his friend, Giyas Ibrahimov, graffitied the pedestal of a statue of Heydar Aliyev, including writing "FUCK THE SYSTEM" and "QUL BAYRAMINIZ MÜBARƏK" (lit. 'Happy Slave Day'). The latter phrase was a pun on the term "gül bayramınız mübarək" (lit. 'Happy Flower Day'), said on the commemoration of Aliyev's birth, 10 May 1923. Mammadov and Ibrahimov subsequently posted images of the graffiti on social media.

On 11 May, Mammadov and Ibrahimov were reported missing by their friends. It was subsequently confirmed on 12 May that the men had been arrested and detained for breaching articles 234.1. and 234.4.3 of the Criminal Code of Azerbaijan, related to drug offences. The National Police stated that both Mammadov and Ibrahimov had a kilogram of heroin in their possession at the time of their respective arrests.

Mammadov subsequently reported that he had been beaten in prison by eight officers and had been threatened with rape, which had led to him signing a false confession; he maintained that the heroin had been planted by Azerbaijani authorities and that he had only been interrogated concerning the graffiti.

On 12 May, the Khatai District Court ordered that Mammadov and Ibrahimov remain in pre-trial detention for a period of four months. Freedom House and Amnesty International expressed concern about their detention and stated that the charges were politically motivated. On 19 May, the Court of Appeals dismissed Mammadov and Ibrahimov's appeal against their pre-trial detention.

On 8 December 2016, Mammadov was sentenced to 10 years' imprisonment by the Baku Court of Grave Crimes on drug-related offences. Amnesty International described the charges as "clearly fabricated" and an attempt by Azerbaijani authorities to stifle freedom of speech, identifying Mammadov as a prisoner of conscience.

Mammadov was held at Prison No. 13 in Puta, Qaradağ raion. In June 2017, Mammadov went on hunger strike to protest the conditions of his imprisonment.

== Release and death ==
On 16 March 2019, Ilham Aliyev issued a presidential decree granting pardons to 51 political prisoners, including Mammadov and Ibrahimov.

On 13 February 2020, the European Court of Human Rights ruled that the Azerbaijani government had violated the European Convention of Human Rights by imprisoning Mammadov and Ibrahimov, ordering that they be paid €30,000 in non-pecuniary damages and €6000 in costs and expenses.

In November 2020, Mammadov moved to Karaköy, Istanbul, Turkey in order to study English; he had stated his intention to use his compensation payment to study at either the Central European University in Hungary or a university in Canada.

On 2 May 2021, Mammadov's body was found in the water in Moda, Istanbul; it was reported that he had entered the water at 15:00 to either retrieve slippers or a fishing rod. His body was identified by a friend and was repatriated to Azerbaijan, where he was buried on 9 May. The Turkish National Police stated that it was not treating Mammadov's death as suspicious, though Azerbaijani human rights activist Elgiz Gahraman alleged that he had seen Turkish documents in which Mammadov's death was listed as "suspicious" and accused Turkish authorities of making "bureaucratic obstacles" to halt any investigation into his death.

Following his death, tributes were paid to Mammadov by Azerbaijani human rights activists including Arzu Geybullayeva and Anar Mammadli. Mammadov's friend and fellow activist, Ilkin Rustamzade, published a book about his friendship with Mammadov, entitled Yoldaş (lit. 'Companion').
