= Azari =

Azari may refer to:

- Āzari, anything related to Iranian Azerbaijan
  - Azerbaijani people
  - A person from the Iranian Azarbaijan
  - Old Azeri language, a now extinct Iranian language previously spoken in the Republic of Azerbaijan and Iranian Azerbaijan
  - Azaris, ancient Iranian people native to Iranian Azerbaijan who spoke Old Azeri
  - Azerbaijani language, a Turkic language
- Āzari, a Persian surname meaning related to Āzar (fire in Persian)
  - Azari Tusi
- Azari Rural District, an administrative subdivision of North Khorasan Province, Iran
- the ancient name of the Catalan village of Vilassar de Dalt

== See also ==
- Azeri (disambiguation)
