= Günəşli, Lerik =

Guneshli
- Municipality
- Azerbaijani: Günəşli
- Location within Azerbaijan
- Coordinates: 38°47′28″N 48°28′17″E
- Country: Azerbaijan
- District: Lerik

Population
  - Total: 1,022
- Time zone: UTC+4 (AZT)
  - Summer (DST): UTC+5 (AZT)

Günəşli (Talysh: Ozobijon), (until 2008, Azərbaycan, Azerbagjan, and Azerbaijan) is a village and municipality in the Lerik District of Azerbaijan. It has a population of 1,022. The municipality consists of the villages of Guneshli and Babagil.

The village's prior name, "Azərbaycan", means "Azerbaijan" in the Azerbaijani language.

== Waterfall ==
The Guneshli waterfall is a waterfall in Günəşli located at the depth of the dense forest. On May 8, 2007, by the decision of the National Assembly of the Republic of Azerbaijan the village included in the administrative territory of Noda village of Lerik District was named Guneshli. Guneshli waterfall is located at a height of 1000m above sea level. The height of Guneshli waterfall is 7 meters and its width is 5 meters The Guneshli waterfall swiftly flows and is divided into tributaries called Varazu and Vizazamin separately. These two tributaries together are called Lerikrivers.

== See also ==
- Qələbin Waterfall
- Mamirli waterfall (Azerbaijan)
