= Mollalı, Oghuz =

Mollalı
- Municipality
- Location within Azerbaijan Location within Shaki-Zagatala Economic Region
- Coordinates: 40°57′51″N 47°37′52″E
- Country: Azerbaijan
- Rayon: Oghuz

Population
  - Total: 573
- Time zone: UTC+4 (AZT)
  - Summer (DST): UTC+5 (AZT)

Mollalı (also, Mollaly) is a village and municipality in the Oghuz Rayon of Azerbaijan. It has a population of 573.
