= Azerbaijani =

Azerbaijani may refer to:

- Somebody or something related to Azerbaijan
- Azerbaijanis
- Azerbaijani language

== See also ==
- Azerbaijan (disambiguation)
- Azeri (disambiguation)
- Azerbaijani cuisine
- Culture of Azerbaijan
