= Pirhəsənli =

- Municipality
- Location within Azerbaijan
- Coordinates: 40°34′48″N 48°21′52″E
- Country: Azerbaijan
- Rayon: Agsu

Population
  - Total: 1,496
- Time zone: UTC+4 (AZT)
  - Summer (DST): UTC+5 (AZT)

Pirhəsənli (also, Pirgasanli and Pirgasanly) is a village and municipality in the Agsu Rayon of Azerbaijan. It has a population of 1,496.
