= Zaur Gurbanli =

Azerbaijani activist

- Zaur Qurbanlı
- Born: 12 January 1987; Baku, Azerbaijan
- Education: Baku State University

Zaur Gurbanli (Azerbaijani: Zaur Qurbanlı, born 12 January 1987) is a youth activist, co-founder and ex-board member of the Nida Civic Movement from February 2011 to December 2012. He was project coordinator and senior official for the arrested members rights in 2013. He is known for his arrest on 1 April 2013, a few days after the protests held in Baku against the non-combat deaths in the military. Gurbanli was accused of bogus charges such as criminal possession of a weapon and acquiring explosive substance and devices. Amnesty International recognized him as a prisoner of conscience. He was sentenced to 8 years of imprisonment on 6 May 2014, but was later pardoned and released on 30 December 2014 after 1 year and 9 months of imprisonment.

== Education ==
He has got his secondary education at school number 17 in Shaki, then continued his education at Shaki Mathematics and Physics School. During these years, he took the first place several times in the history competitions. He completed school with an honors diploma.

In 2003, he was admitted to the Baku State University Law School with 665 points out of 700. He graduated from the university in 2007 and in the same year was called up for the military service.

== Career ==
From 2008, Gurbanli has worked as a lawyer in different institutions, but because of his political views he was dismissed.

== Activity ==
He was one of the establishers of N!DA Civic Movement founded in February 2011. He was selected to the board twice and was project coordinator.

Gurbanli has been a member of Free Writers’ House since 12 January 2013.

Meanwhile, Gurbanli was blogger and on 29 September 2012 he was detained by people in civic gears presenting themselves as officials of Department for Combating Organized Crime because of his political activity and Absheron District court made a decision to administrative arrest for 15 days according to article 310.1 of the Administrative offences Code of the Azerbaijan Republic.

On 1 April 2013, Gurbanli was arrested as a result of repression of the government against the N!DA Civic Movement, and he was taken away to the investigatory department of Grave Crimes of the Head Procurator’s office. Then he was led to Nəsimi raion court and was accused under 228.3 article of the Criminal Code of the Azerbaijan Republic (organized keeping illegal fire-arm and acquiring explosive substance and devices). Preventive punishment of three months was chosen for him as a mean of penalty.

== See also ==
- 2013 Baku protests
- Rashadat Akhundov
- Uzeyir Mammadli
- Rashad Hasanov
