= Mollalı, Qubadli =

Mollalı
- Location within Azerbaijan
- Coordinates: 39°14′41″N 46°40′06″E
- Country: Azerbaijan
- District: Qubadli
- Time zone: UTC+4 (AZT)
  - Summer (DST): UTC+5 (AZT)

Mollalı is a village in the Qubadli Rayon of Azerbaijan. It was occupied by the Armenian forces in 1993. The Army of Azerbaijan recaptured the village on or around October 30, 2020.
