= Lyudmila Dukhovnaya =

Azerbaijani actress

Lyudmila Dukhovnaya Lyudmila Duxovnaya
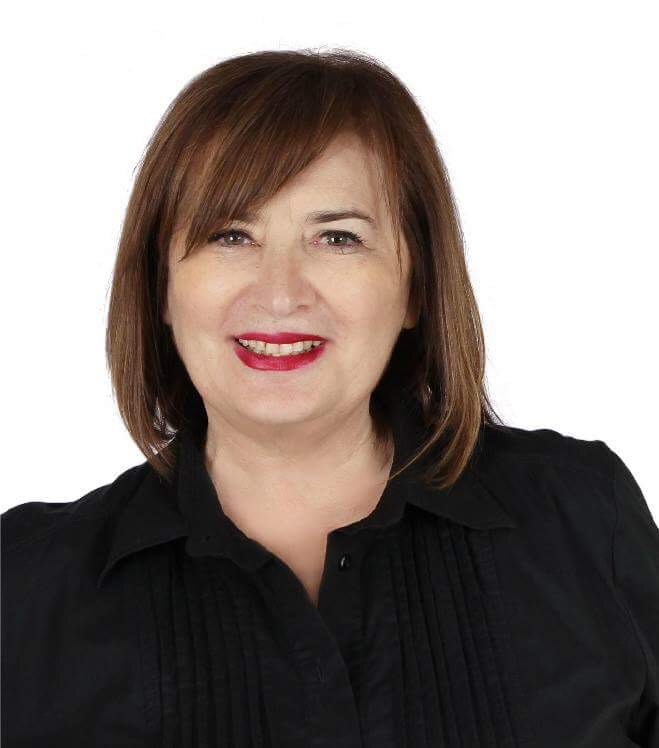
- Born: October 23, 1944 (age 80); Baku, Azerbaijan SSR, USSR
- Occupation: actress
- Years active: 1964–present
- Awards

Lyudmila Semyonovna Dukhovnaya (Azerbaijani: Lyudmila Semyonovna Duxovnaya, Russian: Людмила Семёновна Духовная, born October 23, 1944) is an Azerbaijani actress, People's Artiste of Azerbaijan.

== Biography ==
Lyudmila Dukhovnaya was born on October 23, 1944, in Baku. In 1965, she graduated from the Azerbaijan State Institute of Arts. Since 1964, she has been working at the Azerbaijan State Academic Russian Drama Theatre. She played more than 120 roles.

== Awards ==
- People's Artiste of Azerbaijan — May 22, 1991
- Honored Artist of the Azerbaijan SSR — January 10, 1978
- Shohrat Order — October 23, 2019
- Figaro Acting Prize — 2016
- Golden Darvish Award — 1996
- Humay Award — 2005
