= Adnan Hajizadeh =

Azerbaijani blogger

Adnan Hikmat oglu Hajizada (Azerbaijani: Adnan Hacızadə, born 13 July 1983) is an Azerbaijani blogger and one of the founders of OL! Azerbaijani Youth Movement. He was employed as an internal communications officer at BP.

== Early life and education ==
Hajizada was born in Baku. He graduated from Baku European Lyceum, participated in the Future Leaders Exchange (FLEX) program, and studied for a time at Baku's Qafqaz University. He holds a BA in Political Science from the University of Richmond and a law degree from Khazar University. He also has a masters in public administration from Columbia University.

== Detention and jail sentence ==
On 8 July 2009, Hajizada and another Azerbaijani youth activist and blogger Emin Milli were assaulted and severely beaten by two men in a restaurant in downtown Baku. Milli and Hajizada went to file a complaint about the assault, but instead, police detained and opened a criminal case against them, on grounds of hooliganism.

On 10 July 2009, Judge Rauf Ahmadov of the Sabail district court in Baku placed both of them in pretrial detention for two months. Günter Nooke, German Federal Commissioner for Human Rights who was present in Baku during their trial but had to wait before the court and eventually, was the only one allowed to see Emin Milli for a few minutes. Subsequently, higher court rejected their appeal.

Reporters Without Borders, Organization for Security and Co-operation in Europe and European Union, as well as a number of foreign countries, have strongly condemned Milli and Hajizada's arrest. The case prompted protests from 18 officials of the University of Richmond, where Hajizada studied and from BP, who employed him.

Investigation in Milli and Hajizada's case was concluded on 22 August and an additional charge was brought against them ("deliberately inflicting minor bodily harm"). On 4 September, Judge Araz Huseynov presided over the preparatory session where a variety of defense motions, including one to have the charges dropped, another to permit media coverage of the proceedings and a motion to set the defendants free on bail for the duration of their trial were denied. The first hearing of the case was set on 16 September.

Despite domestic and international pressure, on 11 November, the court sentenced Adnan Hajizada to two years in prison and Emin Milli to two years and six months. Many rights groups, as well as US, condemned the sentence.

In September 2010, President of the United States Barack Obama called for the men's release during a meeting with President Ilham Aliyev. A month later, the court in Azerbaijan has ordered the release of both jailed bloggers.

On 18 January 2024, the European Court of Human Rights ruled that Azerbaijan had violated Articles 5 § 3 and 6 § 1 of the European Convention on Human Rights in the case of Hajizada and Abdullayev vs. Azerbaijan. The Court found that their pre-trial detention had not been properly justified, noting that the domestic courts relied on standard formulas without addressing the specific circumstances of the case. It also ruled that the applicants' trial was fundamentally unfair, finding that the domestic courts failed to adequately explain why they accepted the prosecution's evidence while dismissing testimony from the applicants' friends as biased. Additionally, the domestic courts had refused, without adequate justification, to hear additional defence witnesses who could have supported the applicants' account that they were the victims of the assault rather than the perpetrators. The Court concluded that the criminal proceedings, considered as a whole, were incompatible with the guarantees of a fair hearing and ordered Azerbaijan to pay each applicant €4700 in non-pecuniary damages.

== See also ==
- Emin Milli
