= Azer Amiraslanov =

Azerbaijani politician

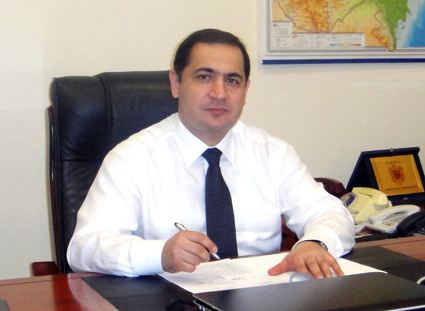

Head of the Department of Economy of the Office of Cabinet of Ministers of the Republic of Azerbaijan
- Incumbent
- Assumed office 4 December 2019
- Prime Minister: Ali Asadov

Assistant to the President for Agrarian Policy Issues – Head of Department of the Presidential Administration of Azerbaijan Republic
- In office 31 May 2017 – 29 November 2019
- President: Ilham Aliyev

The chief of Department for Agrarian Policy Issues of the Presidential Administration of Azerbaijan Republic
- In office 25 August 2008 – 31 May 2017

Member of the Parliament of Azerbaijan, vice-Chairman of the Standing Commission for Economic Policy
- In office 6 November 2005 – 9 September 2008

Personal details
- Born: 19 July 1971 (age 55) Baku, Azerbaijan SSR, Soviet Union (now Azerbaijan)
- Education: Azerbaijan State Economic University

Azer Kamal oglu Amiraslanov (Azerbaijani: Azər Kamal oğlu Əmiraslanov, born July 19, 1971) is the Chairman of the Committee on Economic Policy, Industry and Entrepreneurship of the National Assembly of the Republic of Azerbaijan.

== Biography ==
Azer Amiraslanov was born on July 19, 1971, in Baku. In 1978–1988, he went to secondary school No. 158 in Baku. In 1988, he was admitted to the Azerbaijan State Economic University. After graduating with honors, he was accepted by the Graduate School of the Institute of Economy at the National Academy of Sciences of Azerbaijan in 1993.

== Career ==
In 1993–1994, he served as a senior economist at the Central Bank of Azerbaijan and at the Joint-Stock Commercial Agro-Industrial Bank. In 1994–1998, he was a senior consultant of the Economic Legislation Department of the Parliament of the Republic of Azerbaijan (Milli Majlis).

From 1998 to 2000, he worked as a consultant in the Economic Policy Department at the Presidential Administration.

In 2001–2003, he was the director of the Centre for Economic Analysis and Consulting, in 2003–2004, he worked as a senior economist on macroeconomic policy issues at the Agency for German Technical Cooperation (GTZ).

He served as a member of the Executive Board at the "Ata Holding" Group of Companies and was a director of the Department of Strategy and Business Development from 2004 to 2005.

In 2005–2008, he was a member of the Parliament of the Republic of Azerbaijan. By the Presidential decree dated May 16, 2007, he was appointed as a member of the Supervisory Board of the State Oil Fund of Azerbaijan and continued his activity in the Board from 2007 to 2008.

By the presidential decree dated August 25, 2008, he was appointed to the head of the department of agrarian policy issues at the administration of the President of the Republic of Azerbaijan. He was appointed to the assistant to the president for agrarian policy issues – head of the department by the presidential decree dated May 31, 2017. He worked in this position until November 29, 2019.

By the prime minister decree dated December 4, 2019, he was appointed to the position of the head of the Department of Economy of the Office of Cabinet of Ministers of the Republic of Azerbaijan.

He is the first degree state adviser.

Since 2024, he has been a member of the Parliament of the Republic of Azerbaijan and the chairman of the Parliament's Committee for Economic Policy, Industries and Enterprising.

== Parliamentary activity ==
In 2005, he was elected to the Parliament (National Assembly of Azerbaijan) of the Republic of Azerbaijan from Shamkir city constituency No. 98. He was also a deputy chairman of the Permanent Parliamentary Committee on Economic Policy. He chaired Azerbaijan–Denmark Inter-parliamentary Relations Working Group and was a member of Azerbaijan-United States, Azerbaijan-United Kingdom, Azerbaijan-Saudi Arabia and Azerbaijan-Kuwait Inter-parliamentary Relations Working Groups. He was also a member of the delegation of Azerbaijan and the European Union Parliamentary Cooperation and was also a member of the Azerbaijani delegation in the Parliamentary Assembly of CIS. After the appointment to the head of the department at the Presidential Administration of Azerbaijan, his parliamentary powers were terminated by the decision of the Central Election Commission of the Republic of Azerbaijan.

In 2024, he was elected to the Parliament of the Republic of Azerbaijan from Agstafa constituency No. 108. He is the head of the Working Group for the Azerbaijani-Tunisia Interparliamentary Relations.

== Academic activity ==
In 1996, he successfully defended his dissertation on "The problems of state regulation of the economy in a market relations condition" at the Institute of Economy at the National Academy of Sciences of Azerbaijan and obtained the Doctor of Philosophy Degree (Ph.D.) in Economics.

He is the author of 6 books and more than 50 scientific articles. He published over 300 analytical and economic articles in the local and international press. He closely participated in the development of several programs and concepts, and draft laws related to the economic and agricultural sectors.

In 2001–2002, he taught the course on "World Economy" in English at Western University and the Azerbaijan State University of Languages. In 2008-2017, he was a lecturer of Azerbaijan State Economic University.

Since 2019, he has been the head of the Department of State Regulation of the Economy at the Academy of Public Administration under the President of the Republic of Azerbaijan.

== International experience ==
In 2000, within the international program of IREX, he conducted research on "Government, Economy and Business" at the Small Business Administration of U.S., and explored the experiences of management of the U.S. economy in Washington DC. He attended and presented a number of reports at various seminars, conferences and business meetings organized in the United States, Mexico, Japan, Germany, Austria, France, Great Britain, Italy, Spain, Belgium, Romania, Czech Republic, Slovakia, Turkey, Russia, Ukraine, Georgia, Hungary, Macedonia, Moldova, Estonia, Sweden, Serbia and Bulgaria. He received certificates from organizations such as International Monetary Fund (IMF), Bilkent University (Turkey), Institute for Public-Private Partnership (USA), United States Agency for International Development (USAID), IREX, Japan International Cooperation Agency (JICA), and United States Telecommunications Training Institute (USTTI).

== Public activity ==
In 1993, he founded the Association of Young Economists. Since 2007, he has been the President of the Economic Reforms Foundation. Azer Amiraslanov is fluent in English, Russian and Turkish.

== Personal life ==
He is married and has two children.
