= Azerbaijan State University of Economics =

Public university in Baku, Azerbaijan

- Azerbaijani: Azərbaycan Dövlət İqtisad Universiteti
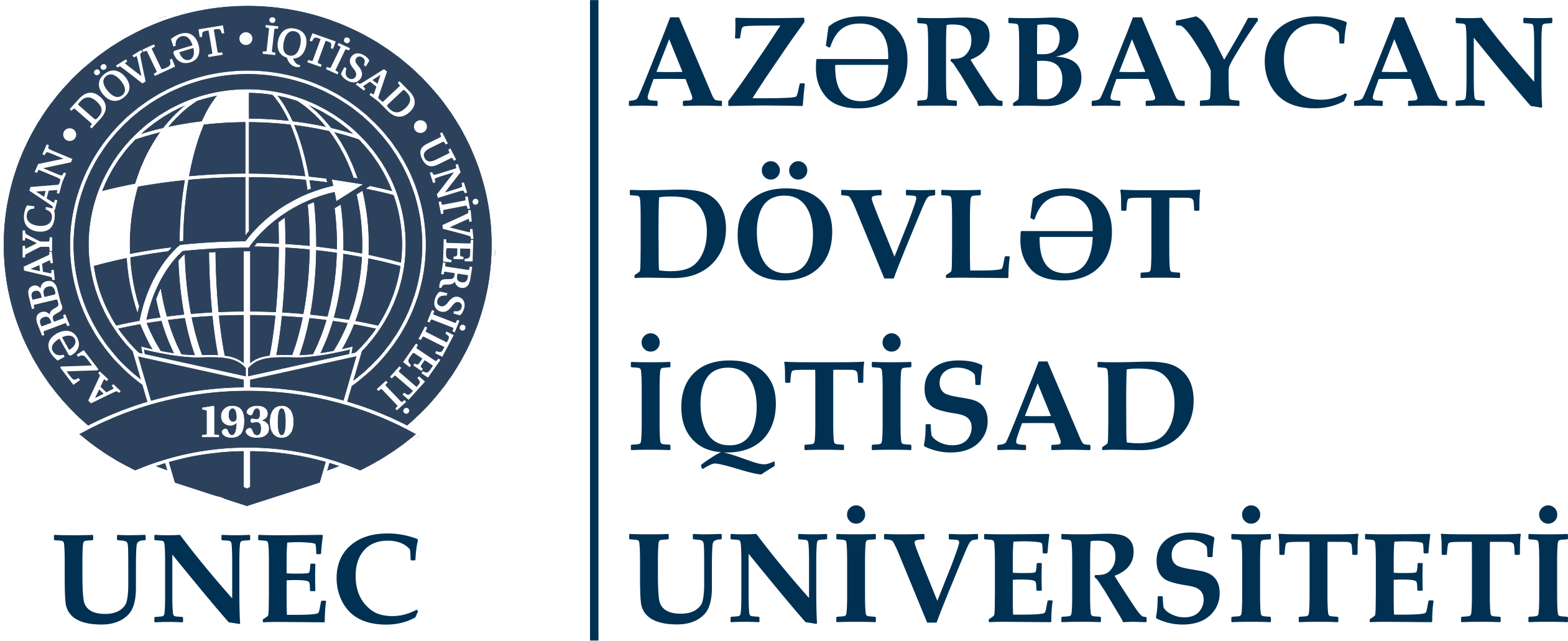
- Type: Public university
- Established: June 19, 1930; 96 years ago
- Affiliations: EUA; Bologna Process; Erasmus Programme; Federation of the Universities of the Islamic World; FIBAA
- Rector: Prof. Adalat Muradov
- Students: 22,000
- Location: Baku, Azerbaijan; 40.37°N 49.83°E
- Colours
- Website: unec.edu.az
- Location in Baku, Azerbaijan Azerbaijan State University of Economics (Azerbaijan)

University rankings

Global – Overall
- QS World: 801-850 (2026)

Regional – Overall
- QS Emerging Europe and Central Asia: 221-230 (2022)

Azerbaijan State University of Economics (abbreviated as UNEC; Azerbaijani: Azərbaycan Dövlət İqtisad Universiteti) is a public university located in Baku, Azerbaijan. Founded in 1930, as a specialised economic institution in Soviet Azerbaijan, it is currently one of the largest and oldest educational institutions in Transcaucasia. UNEC, employing more than 1000 academic staff, including 120 professors and 600 associate professors, has 22 thousand students in 14 faculties across 5 branches in Baku, Zagatala, and Derbent. The University is a full member of the European University Association, Federation of the Universities of the Islamic World, University Council of Organization of the Black Sea Economic Cooperation and Eurasian Association of Universities.

== History ==

Originally, it was a part of Baku State University. It became a separate university in 1930. Over the years, its name has changed a number of times, and it was re-merged and re-separated from Baku State on several occasions. On its creation in 1930, the school was named the Trade-Cooperative Institute. In 1933, the government of Azerbaijan SSR changed the name to the "Azerbaijan Social-Economic University named after Karl Marx" (similar to the naming of the Azerbaijan Medical University named after Nariman Narimanov), and introduced curricula on accounting, law and finance. In 1936, the name was tweaked to the "Azerbaijan Social-Economic Institute named after Karl Marx". With the onset of World War II, UNEC was folded into Baku State University's Department of Economics. By 1944 the school was separated again, this time as the Azerbaijan National Economic Institute. It remained under this name until March 1959, when war caused it to be folded back into Baku State University.

In 1966, the school separated once again, and has remained independent since, initially as the Azerbaijan National Economic Institute named after Dadash Bunyadzade. In 1987, the name was changed to the Finance-Economic Institute; and in 2000 the name was finally changed to its current form by an act of the Azerbaijani government.

In 2007, a Library and Information Center and a student Career Center started functioning at UNEC and also a new 7-floor educational building that meets the highest international standards was opened. The same year UNEC received the “European quality” award and the European Club of Rectors and European University Association. On its Main Building on Istiglaliyyat street, a 24/7 open library is operating since 2018.

The strategic direction of UNEC development was to bring the educational process up to the international standards by 2010, finishing the international accreditation process and ensuring full compliance with Bologna Process, as well as more active participation in the international market of educational services. Currently, the university is chaired by rector professor Adalat Muradov and five vice rectors.

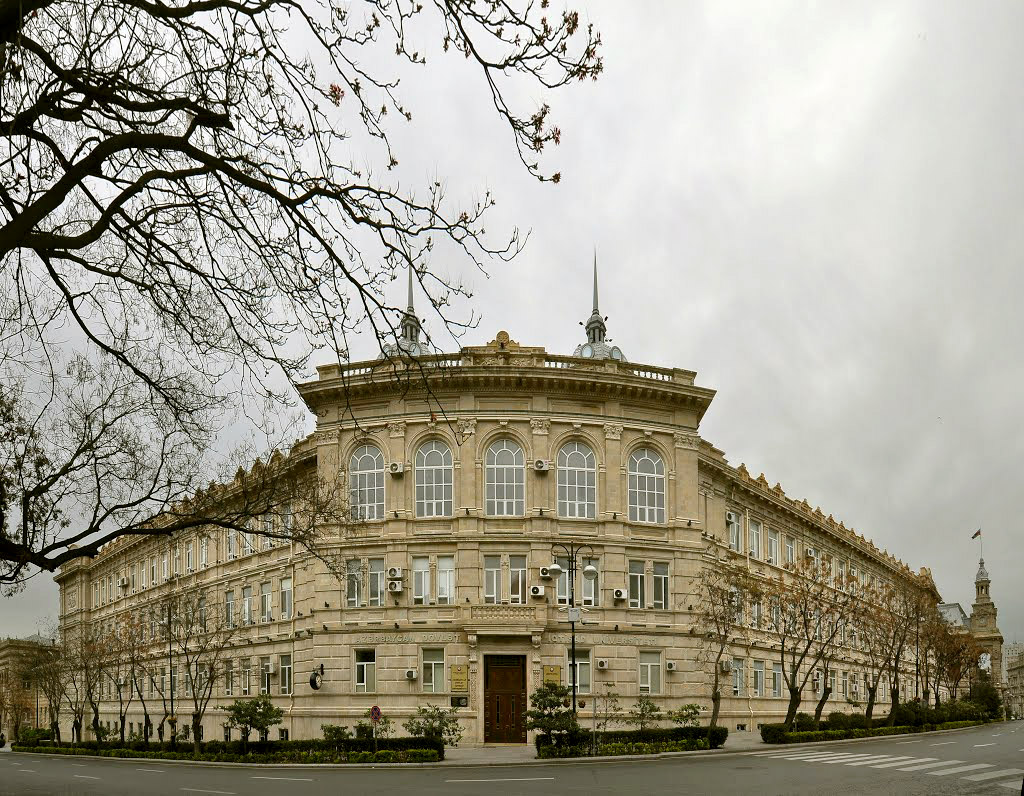

== Branches ==
=== Derbent branch ===
The Derbent branch of the Azerbaijan State Economic University was founded in 1993 by Heydar Aliyev. However, the official opening of the branch of the Azerbaijan State Economic University in the city of Derbent of the Republic of Dagestan of the Russian Federation was held only in November 2016. The total area of the Derbent branch is more than 11 thousand km2. There are 32 classrooms in the university, with a total capacity of 1,000 students. In the first year, 69 people were recruited to the university. At the moment, students can study in four areas:

- World economy
- Finance and credit
- Accounting, analysis and audit
- General Economy

Along with this, branch students also can enjoy all the privileges and international relations of the university – so they can also receive double diplomas and participate in international exchanges.

=== Zagatala branch ===
Under the Azerbaijan State University of Economics, there is also a branch in one of the north-western cities of Azerbaijan – Zagatala. The basis of the Zagatala branch was laid on the basis of the branch of the Azerbaijan State Pedagogical University under the decree of the President of the Republic of Azerbaijan of April 29, 2016. The official opening of the branch took place on September 15, 2016. Training takes place in 4 main directions:

- Business management
- Finance
- Accounting
- Economy

The first set included 113 students from 37 different regions of Azerbaijan.

== International cooperation ==
The Azerbaijan State University of Economics has connections with foreign universities.

Thus, UNEC cooperates with the Siegen University of Germany in the direction of organizing summer and winter schools. In 2016, a winter school was held at the University of Siegen, in which participated teachers and students from both universities. A joint project entitled "Entrepreneurship education: as the main factor in creation of jobs and employment in Azerbaijan" started in 2016 and is planned to be completed in 2019.

UNEC was declared the winner of the TEMPUS IV program of the 6th convocation for a project called "Development and improvement of university management in the field of international relations". As a winner, UNEC was awarded a grant for implementation by the European Commission. In 2017, this project, whose goal was the formation of international relations based on the attraction of students and teachers in the international educational environment, was realized. Closing ceremony was attended by such personalities as the rector of UNEC Adalat Muradov, head of the office of the national program Erasmus+ Azerbaijan Parviz Bagirov, representative of the Ministry of Education of Azerbaijan Yashar Omarov, UK University of Warwick Fellow James Kennedy, Vice-Rector for International Relations and Programs UNEC Shahin Bayramov and as well as representatives of the Ministry of Education of Ukraine, Kyrgyzstan and Tajikistan.

In 2015, for the first time in Azerbaijan, UNEC joined the International Program of the London University – the London School of Economics (LSE). Within the framework of this program, UNEC students receive education both in accordance with the curriculum of UNEC and in the curriculum of the London School of Economics. Students are provided with all the necessary materials and benefits, and upon completion of the training, the students of this program receive two diplomas.

In addition to the London School of Economics and Politics, students can receive a second diploma from the French University of Montpellier in 2016. This can be done in two ways: students can go to the University of Montpellier from the third year to continue their studies for a year there, or continue their studies at UNEC, but according to the curricula of Montpellier. In both cases, students receive accreditation and a second diploma from the University of Montpellier.

== Awards and certificates ==
2006 – Azerbaijan State University of Economics was awarded the "Golden Fortune" prize, which was held by the International Academy of Rating Technologies and Sociology. The university participated under the nomination "Rating of popularity". The award was given for the creation of a new model of economic education in the territory of the CIS. Before, UNEC received the "Silver Fortune" award in 2002.

2006 – UNEC was nominated for the National Award "Uğur". The prize was awarded for the fact that the university contributed to the development and advancement of science, as well as to the development of national cadres.

2007 – The university received the "University of the Year" award, which was held at the national level.

2007 – UNEC was awarded the “Intellect – 2007” Prize for the creation of the project of the Information and Library Center in UNEC.

2008 – At the conference held in Ankara, UNEC received an award for the contribution and development of the Turkic world and culture.

2009 – The International Academy of Professionals, which was established in Kyiv in 1996, awarded the "Golden Medal" to the Azerbaijan State Economic University for merits in the scientific sphere and training of personnel.

2009 – The "Child of Motherland" award and the "Dada Gorgud" medal were awarded to the university rector for the fact that the university made a contribution to the development of Azerbaijan, from both economic and social sides. The award was presented by the Supreme Council of the Dada Gorgud Foundation.

2010 – Within the framework of the international image program "Millennium Award" UNEC received three awards – a diploma, a cup and an order for the fact that the university used modern educational technologies and introduced innovations in the educational system.

2015 – The university was awarded the certificate "Best Performance" for the best presentation at the 9th Azerbaijan International Education and Career Exhibition. This is the only university that received the certificate "Best Performance" at the exhibition, which was attended by more than 130 institutions of higher education from 16 countries.

2015 – Business School UNEC was recognized as a full member of the Accreditation of the Business School of the European Foundation for Management Development (EFMD) for the first time in Azerbaijan.

2016 – UNEC retained its leadership among universities in Azerbaijan in accordance with the list identified by the rankings of the world's higher education institutions "The Ranking Web" and "Webometrics".

2016 – According to the latest results of 2016, introduced by UniRank, which determines the popularity of the world universities on the Internet, UNEC was the first among universities in Azerbaijan.

== Honorary doctorates ==
- Heydar Aliyev, former president and national leader of Azerbaijan
- Suzanne Mubarak, former First Lady of Arab Republic of Egypt
- Dr. Ismail Serageldin, director of Bibliotheca Alexandrina
- Konstantinos Stephanopoulos, former President of Greece
- Joseph Stiglitz, Nobel prize winner
- Erik Stark M, Nobel Prize Laureate in Economics, Professor at University of Harvard
- Finn Erlinq Kidland, Nobel Prize Laureate in Economics, Professor at University of Carnegie-Mellon University, Norway
- Christopher A. Pissarides, Nobel Prize Laureate in Economics, Head of Chair and program director at London School of Economics
- Robert Mandell, Columbia University Professor – US, Nobel Prize Laureate
- Roger Myerson, Nobel Prize Laureate in Economics, Professor of Arizona University (USA)
- Kenneth Arrow, Nobel Prize Laureate in Economics, Professor at Harvard University (USA), Founder of School of Economy

== Rectors ==
- Mehdi bay Ismayilov (1930–1934)
- Rashid Qayıbov (1934–1937)
- Macid Quliyev (1937)
- Habib Huseynov (1937–1939)
- Bilqeyis Hashimzade (1939–1941)
- Aliqulu Farajov (1945–1950)
- Xurshud Mammadov (1951–1954)
- Shamil Aliyev (1955–1959)
- Sarvar Aslanli (1966–1973)
- Zeynal Alakbarov (1973–1986)
- Ragib Guliyev (1986–1989)
- Fuad Alasgarov (1989–1992)
- Hasan Gasimov (1992–1994)
- İslam Garayev (1994–2000)
- Ali Abbasov (2000–2004)
- Shamsaddin Hajiyev (2004–2014)
- Adalat Muradov (2014-right now)

== Famous graduates ==
- Ismat Abbasov, Deputy Prime Minister of Azerbaijan Republic
- Avaz Alakbarov, former Minister of Finance of Azerbaijan Republic
- Fizuli Alakbarov, former Minister of Labor and Social Protection of Population of Azerbaijan Republic
- Azer Amiraslanov, The chief of Department for Agrarian Policy Issues of the Presidential Administration of Azerbaijan Republic
- Heydar Asadov, Minister of Agriculture of Azerbaijan Republic
- Rufat Aslanli, Chairman of State Committee for Securities of Azerbaijan Republic
- Nazim Ibrahimov, Chairman of State Committee on Work with Diaspora of Azerbaijan Republic
- Telman Ismailov, Ex Businessman
- Karam Hasanov, Chairman of State Property Issues Committee of Azerbaijan Republic
- Mikayil Jabbarov, Minister of Education of Azerbaijan Republic
- Eldar Mahmudov, former Minister of National Security of Azerbaijan Republic
- Fazil Mammadov, Minister of Taxes of Azerbaijan Republic
- Ali Masimov, former acting Prime Minister of Azerbaijan Republic
- Salim Muslumov, Minister of Labor and Social Protection of Population of Azerbaijan Republic
- Shahin Mustafayev, Minister of Economy and Industry of Azerbaijan Republic
- Elman Rustamov, Chairman of the Management Board of Central Bank of Azerbaijan
- Ilkin Rustamzade, Azerbaijani human rights activist

== Interesting facts ==
=== Setting for Novel Ali and Nino ===
Kurban Said's landmark novel, Ali and Nino, opens in a classroom in the Economics University building in Baku. Ali Khan, the protagonist, took his final graduation exams in that building, which is located on one of Baku's most prestigious streets – Independence (Istiglaliyyat), though at the time of the novel, it was called Nikolay Street, named after the Russian czar Nicholas II. Nino's school, now Public School No. 132, was located across the street.

Curiously, both Yusif Vazir (Chamanzaminli) (1887-1943), the Core Author of Ali and Nino, as well as Essad Bey / Lev Nussimbaum (1905-1942) both attended this school. Vazirov attended Baku Realni High School (having transferred in as a refugee from Shusha) beginning in 1906 and he graduated in 1909.

Lev Nussimbaum attended Men's Gymnasium No. 2, which at that time (1914-1920) was housed inside Baku Realni. Though Nussimbaum was often absent due to sickness and political unrest, he was enrolled from Junior Preparatory to the beginning of Fourth Grade when he fled the Bolshevik takeover of the Baku government (1920). This school offered classes through Eighth Grade. Documents indicate that Nussimbaum failed his Azerbaijani class in 1919, the only time records exist showing that he had enrolled in Azerbaijani.

For the first time in the country, the 7/24 library at UNEC allows students to easily prepare for classes and exams.

== Gallery ==
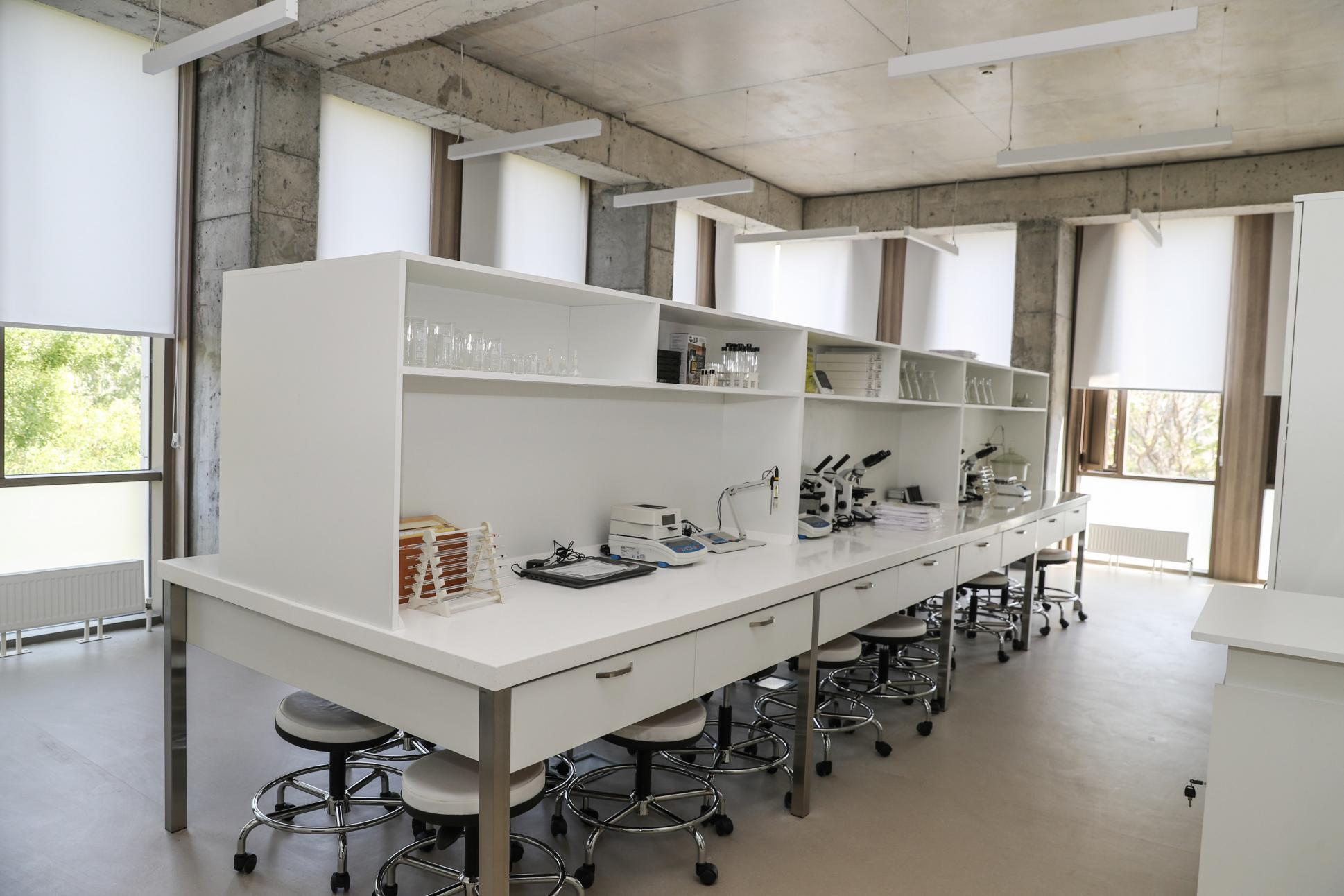

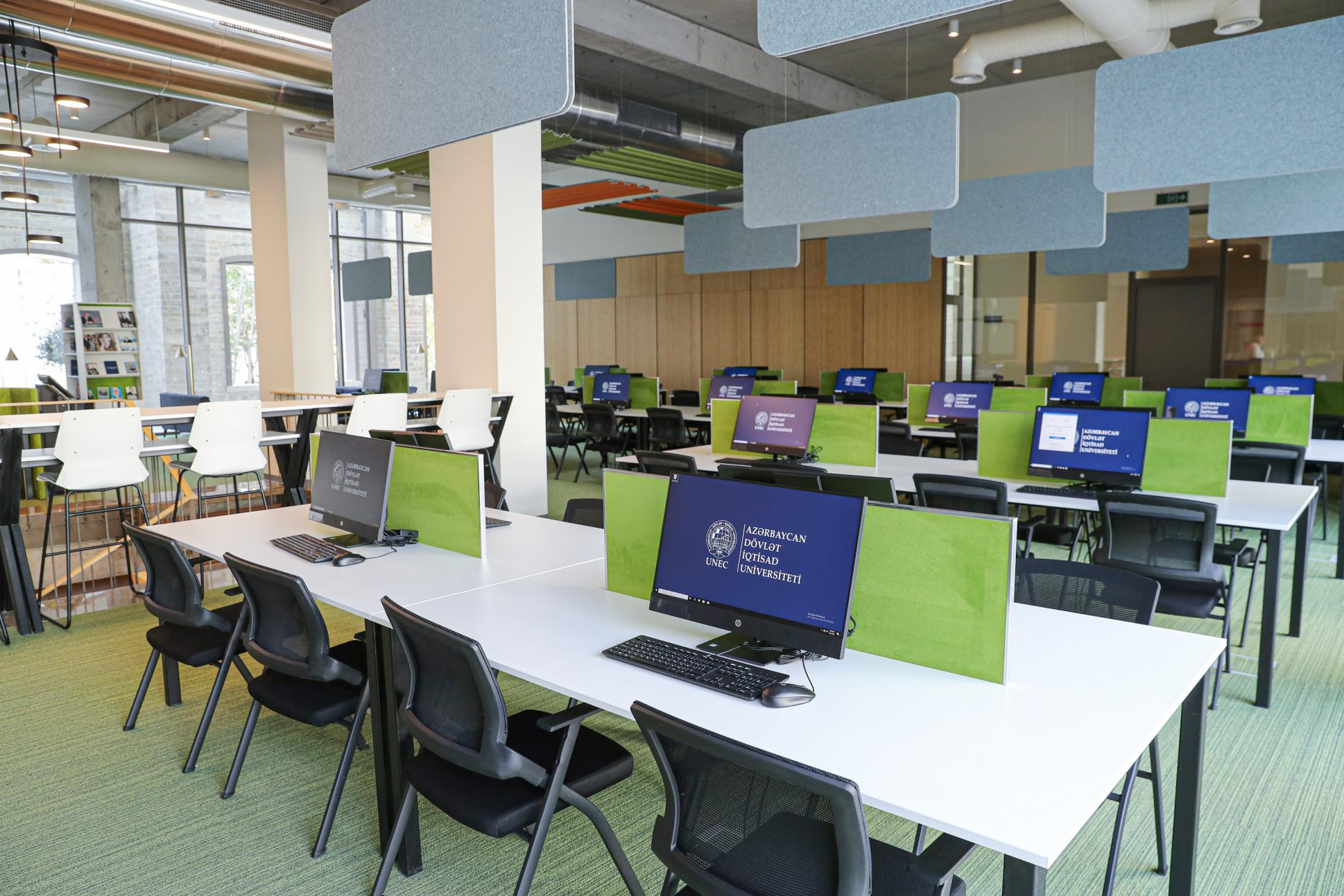
