= Karam Hasanov =

Azerbaijani politician

Hidayat Orujov Hidayət Orucov

Chairman of State Property Issues Committee of Azerbaijan Republic
- Incumbent
- Assumed office 19 May 2009
- President: Ilham Aliyev
- Preceded by: office established

Personal details
- Born: 2 August 1969 (age 56)

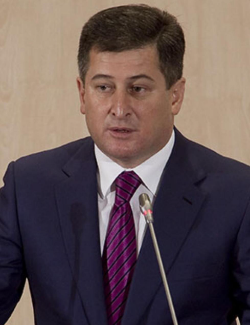
Karam Hasanov

Karam Hasanov Avaz oglu (Azerbaijani: Kərəm Həsənov Əvəz oğlu; born 2 August 1969) is an Azerbaijani politician serving as the Chairman of State Property Issues Committee of Azerbaijan Republic.

Hasanov was born on 2 August 1969. He was appointed the Chairman of State Property Issues Committee on 19 May 2009, when the committee was established. Hasanov is an economist by profession.

== See also ==
- Cabinet of Azerbaijan
