= Mollalı, Jalilabad =

Settlement in Jalilabad Rayon, Azerbaijan

Mollalı is a village and municipality in the Jalilabad Rayon of Azerbaijan. It has a population of 261.
