= Fizuli Alakbarov =

Azerbaijani politician

Fizuli Alakbarov Füzuli Ələkbərov

Minister of Labor and Social Protection of Population of Azerbaijan Republic
- In office February 7, 2006 – October 22, 2013
- President: Ilham Aliyev

Personal details
- Born: 1958 (age 67–68) Julfa, Azerbaijan SSR, USSR

Fizuli Alakbarov Hasan oglu (Azerbaijani: Füzuli Ələkbərov Həsən oğlu) is an Azerbaijani politician who serves as the Minister of Labor and Social Protection of Population of Azerbaijan Republic.

== Early life ==
Alakbarov was born in 1958 in Julfa, Azerbaijan. He was the second of three sons in the family. In 1980, he graduated from the Department of Physics and Mathematics of Azerbaijan State University. In 1991, Alakbarov graduated from Azerbaijan State Economic University with a degree in Economics.

In 1987–1992, he worked as the director of Sputnik of International Youths Tourism Bureau. From 1992 through 2006, he was the President of Improtex Group of Companies. He founded the first tourism company, Improtex and its subsidiary Imair Airlines in the early 1990s, starting direct flights from Baku to Dubai and Istanbul.

During the winter days of the First Nagorno-Karabakh War, Alakbarov shipped footwear to Azerbaijani soldiers on the frontline. He made medical shipments and volunteered to donate blood to be transported to the hospital in Qaradağlı village of Agdam.

In 1996, he was elected the President of the Azerbaijan Judo Federation. From May 2003 until 2006, he was a member of the Council of Entrepreneurs of Azerbaijan Republic.

== Political career ==
In February 2006, Alakbarov was appointed the Minister of Labor and Social Protection of the Population of Azerbaijan Republic by President Ilham Aliyev. As a minister, he paid special attention to accommodating the disabled veterans from Karabakh War. New buildings in Baku were built and provided to the disabled and their families in Baku.

== See also ==
- Cabinet of Azerbaijan
- Tourism in Azerbaijan
