= Emin Milli =

Azerbaijani human rights activist

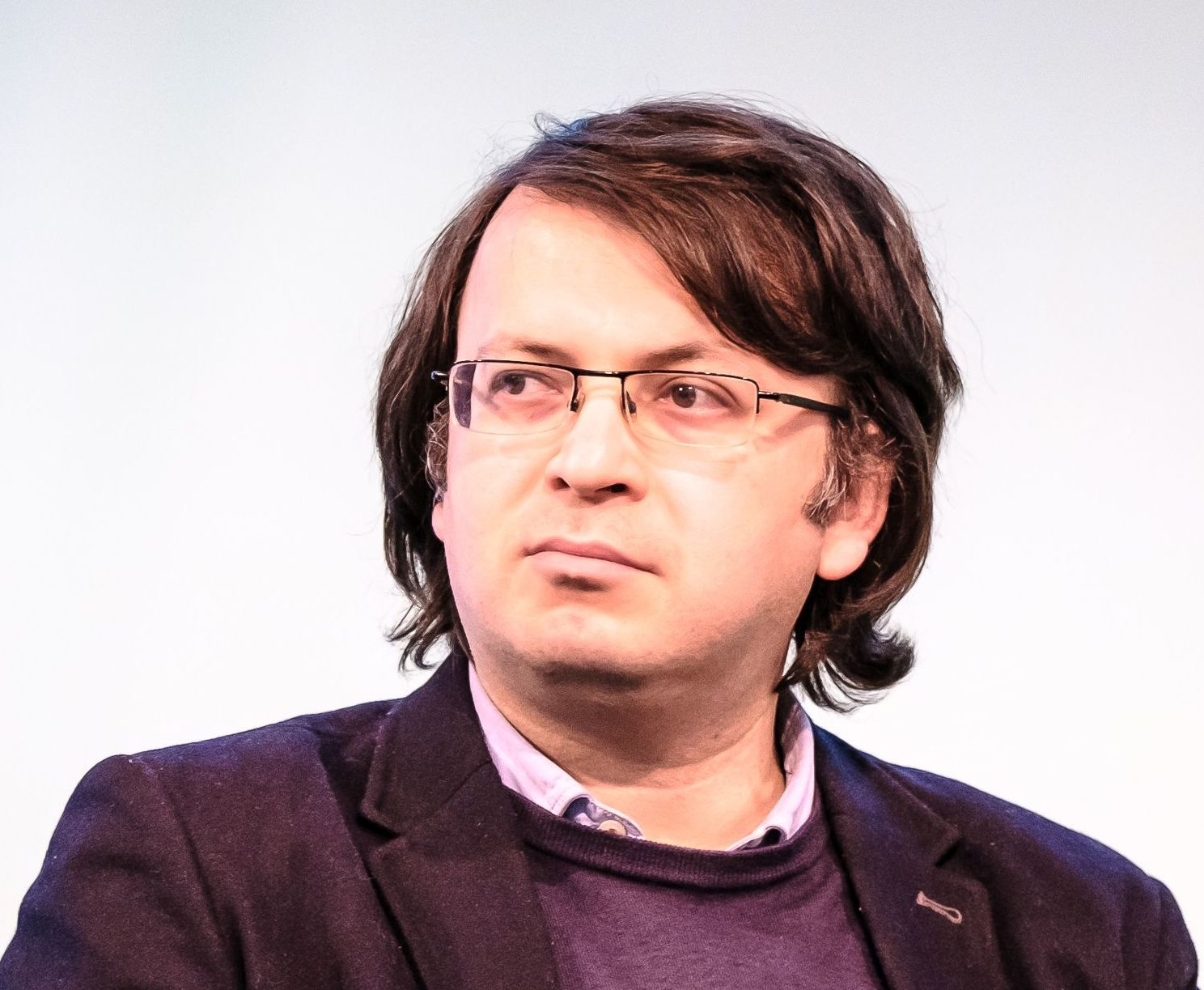
Emin Milli in 2016

Emin Milli (Abdullayev) (born 14 October 1979) is an Azerbaijani human rights activist who lives in Germany. He used to be the managing director at Meydan TV until April 2019.

== Background ==
Born in Baku, Azerbaijan, Milli was imprisoned in 2009 for two and a half years for his critical views about the government. He was conditionally released in November 2010, after serving 16 months of his sentence, in part due to strong international pressure on the government of Azerbaijan. From 2002-2004, Milli was director of the Friedrich Ebert Foundation and also advised the Council of Europe on more than 40 cases of political prisoners in Azerbaijan, many of whom were released following pressure from the Council. Before that, he was a coordinator for the International Republican Institute in Azerbaijan. He studied at the University of London's School of Oriental and African Studies (SOAS), where he wrote his dissertation on new media and Arab revolutions.

Emin is currently a Founder and Managing Director of Restart Initiative and the Co-Founder of Daha Yaxşı, Restart Initiative's media project.

== Detention and trial ==
On 8 July 2009, Milli and Adnan Hajizade were assaulted and severely beaten by two men in a restaurant in downtown Baku. Milli and Hajizada went to file a complaint about the assault, but instead, police detained and opened a criminal case against them, on grounds of hooliganism.

On 10 July 2009, Judge Rauf Ahmedov of the Sabail district court in Baku placed both of them in pretrial detention for two months. German Federal Commissioner for Human Rights Günter Nooke was in Baku during their trial and was the only one allowed to see Milli for a few minutes after being kept waiting. Subsequently, a higher court rejected their appeal.

Reporters Without Borders, Organization for Security and Co-operation in Europe, and European Union, as well as a number of foreign countries strongly condemned Milli and Hajizade's arrest. The case prompted protests from 18 officials of the University of Richmond, where Hajizade had studied, and from BP, where Hajizade worked. Amnesty International designated Milli a prisoner of conscience.

Investigation of Milli and Hajizade's case was concluded on 22 August 2009, and an additional charge was brought against them ("deliberately inflicting minor bodily harm"). On 4 September 2009, Judge Araz Huseynov presided over the preparatory session where various defense motions (including one to have the charges dropped, one to permit media coverage of the proceedings, and a motion to set the defendants free on bail for the duration of their trial) were denied. After two months of court hearings, both Milli and Hajizade were found guilty. Hajizade was sentenced two years in prison, and Milli was sentenced to two-and-a-half years of prison.

US President Barack Obama called on his Azerbaijani counterpart, Ilham Aliyev, to free the imprisoned Milli and Hajizade when the two leaders had a bilateral meeting during the UN General Assembly session in New York on 24 September 2010. The US administration said Obama urged Aliyev to free the two men as part of an increased effort to protect human rights and implement democratic reforms.

== After release ==
Milli was conditionally released in November 2010 and was not allowed to leave Azerbaijan until June 2011. The New York Times covered some details of his life after his release. He continued to be one of the most critical voices of dissent and campaigned internationally for release of all political prisoners in Azerbaijan. Milli addressed the President Aliyev during Internet Governance Forum in November 2012 with an open letter about the situation in Azerbaijan. The letter was published in The Independent, Le Monde Blog, Tagesspiegel, Gazeta Wyborcza and Radio Azadliq.

Milli started a news portal, Meydan TV, in 2013, leaving the job in 2019.

He founded a new project called Restart Initiative focusing on creating a platform for the representatives of Azerbaijani and Armenian public to meet and discuss coexistence, cooperation, business and neighborly relations.

Emin visited Azerbaijan for the first time in 12 years in January 2025 and went to Karabakh.

== See also ==
- Adnan Hajizade
