= Günter Nooke =

German politician (born 1959)

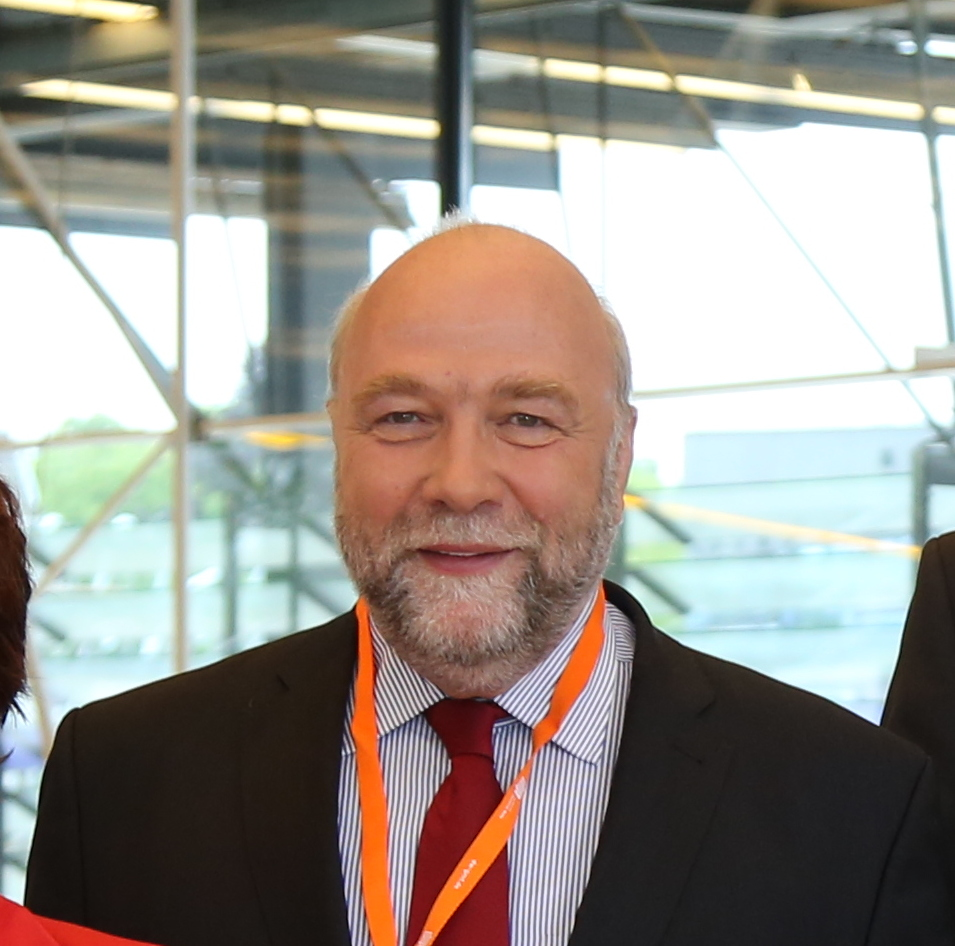

Member of the Bundestag
- In office 1998–2005

Personal details
- Born: 21 January 1959 (age 67) Forst (Lausitz), Bezirk Cottbus, East Germany (now Germany)
- Citizenship: German
- Party: CDU
- Spouse: Maria Herche
- Children: 3
- Occupation: Politician

Günter Nooke (born 21 January 1959) is a German CDU politician and a former civil rights activist.

== Background ==
Nooke was born in Forst (Lausitz), Germany, a small town in Brandenburg. He grew up there only 150 km (90 mi) southeast of Berlin, in the communist German Democratic Republic (GDR), near the Polish border.

He was educated in Forst, Cottbus and at the University of Leipzig, where he studied physics from 1980 to 1985. After graduating Nooke worked as a research assistant, latterly as a head of section from 1985 to 1990 at the industrial hygiene inspectorate in Cottbus.

He currently works as Director Internationals Affairs at Worldwide Hospitals (WWH), a global healthcare company that offers flexible solutions that fill gaps in medical infrastructure.

He is married to sociologist Maria Nooke. They have three children.

== Political career ==
Since 1987, Nooke had been a member of a church opposition group and got involved in the growing democracy movement in 1989, which led to the fall of the Berlin Wall. Following the first (and only) democratic election in the GDR, he became Member of the People's Chamber for the opposition group named Alliance 90.

From 1990, to 1994 Nooke was a member of the parliament of the state of Brandenburg and was the chairman of the parliamentary group of Alliance 90. In 1996, he joined the CDU with other former civil rights activists.

From 1998 to 2005 Nooke was a member of the German Bundestag, deputy chairman (2000–2002) and spokesperson for cultural and media affairs (2002–2005) of the CDU/CSU parliamentary group.

=== Positions in the German government ===
On 8 March 2006, Nooke was appointed as the Federal Commissioner for Human Rights Policy and Humanitarian Aid in the government of Chancellor Angela Merkel. He was succeeded in this office by Markus Löning in 2010.

Since April 2010, Nooke has been serving as Personal Representative of the German Chancellor for Africa in the Federal Ministry of Economic Cooperation and Development (BMZ), under the leadership of ministers Dirk Niebel (2009–2013) and Gerd Müller (since 2013).

=== Controversy ===
In a 2018 interview with German tabloid BZ, Nooke made a number of allegations that were later criticised as racist and neo-colonial, such as the suggestion that colonialism was beneficial for Africa and that the hot and humid climate was responsible for lower work productivity amongst Africans; he also suggested African states should lease their land to a foreign entity such as the World Bank to "allow free development for 50 years" implying that it was solely the incompetence and corruption of African heads of state that were responsible for the dearth of jobs and opportunities in many African states. His suggestion was widely criticised as reeking of neo-colonialism by academics and journalists. In the ensuing controversy, Nooke allegedly threatened to dismiss a non-tenured faculty member of the University of Hamburg, Raja Kramer, who had served as the voluntary head of a German association of Africa scientists (Fachverbands Afrikanistik).

== Other activities ==
- Amref Health Africa, Member of the Board of Trustees
- German-Azerbaijani Forum, Member of the Board of Trustees
- World Vision Deutschland, Member of the Board of Trustees (since 2009)
- Deutsche Welle, Deputy Chairman of the Broadcasting Council (2003–2014)
