= Mollalı, Barda =

Mollalı
- Municipality
- Location within Azerbaijan Location within Karabakh Economic Region
- Coordinates: 40°20′37″N 47°18′14″E
- Country: Azerbaijan
- Rayon: Barda

Population
  - Total: 2,568
- Time zone: UTC+4 (AZT)
  - Summer (DST): UTC+5 (AZT)

Mollalı (also, Mollaly and Mollavellilar) is a village and municipality in the Barda Rayon of Azerbaijan. It has a population of 2,568.

== Notable natives ==
- Sefiyar Behbudov — National Hero of Azerbaijan.
