= Nida Civic Movement =

Azerbaijani civic movement

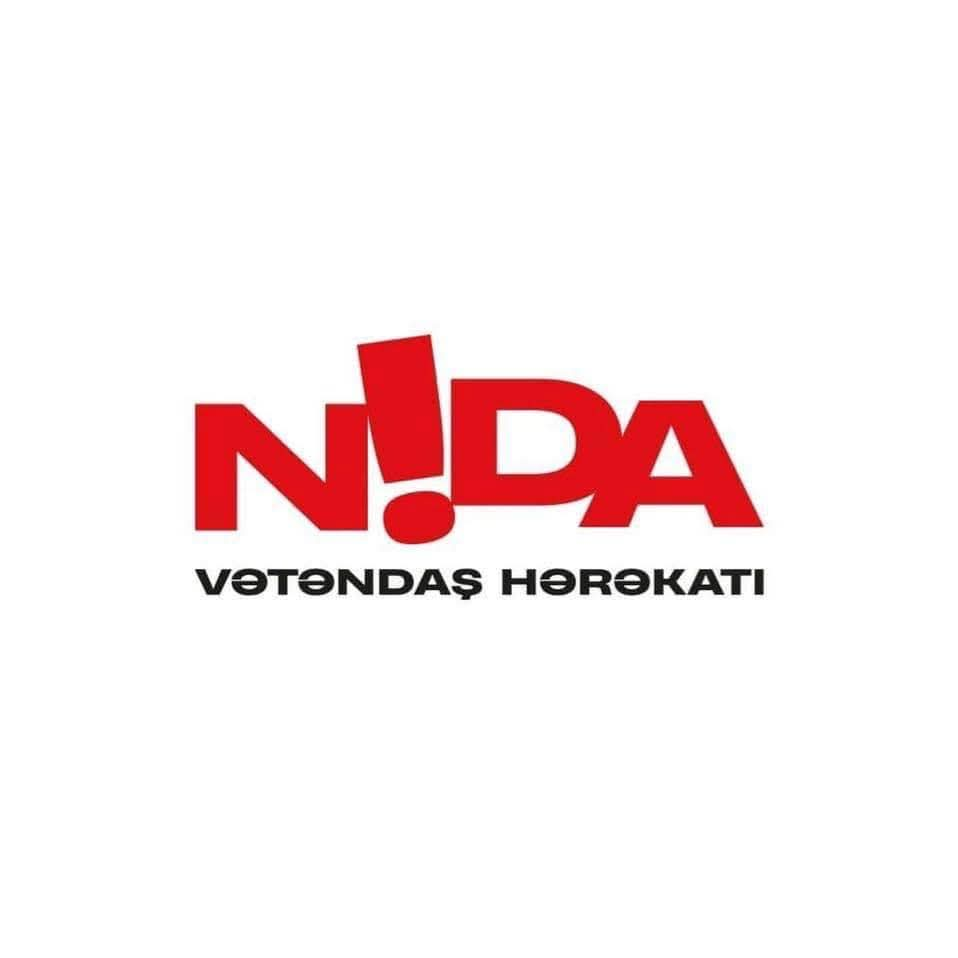
- Founded: 4 February 2011; 15 years ago
- Type: Civic movement
- Purpose: Human rights, Free and democratic elections, Free media, High quality education and medicine
- Location: Baku, Azerbaijan
- Region served: Azerbaijan
- Method: Nonviolent protests (marches, picketing, sit-ins, flashmobs, protest art), Educational activities, Fund raising
- Key people: Administrative board
- Volunteers: 350+
- Website: N!DA Civic Movement

Nida Civic Movement (Azerbaijani: Nida Vətəndaş Hərəkatı), commonly referred to as N!DA or simply Nida, is an Azerbaijani civic movement founded in early 2011 to achieve democratic and social changes in Azerbaijan. Currently it has over 350 members comprising mainly young individuals as well as well-known politicians and activists. The movement claims to have no affiliation with any of the political parties in the country. Nida means "exclamation" in Azerbaijani.

== Principles ==
The stated purpose of the movement is to defend the constitutional and human rights of the society, and the preserval of democratic and republican values. N!DA also aims to attract citizens, especially, youth and students into the socio-political processes of the country in order to democratize Azerbaijan and increase their influence in the processes. They states that it's not a political party and it has no intention to be represented in the government.

== Political prisoners ==
Seven activists of N!DA, including four board members, were kidnapped and arrested with different bogus accusations a few days after the protests held against the non-combat military deaths in March and April 2013 in Baku, Azerbaijan. One more member of the movement, Omar Mammadov was arrested in January 2014. Initially, a criminal case has been launched on articles 234.1 (illegally obtaining, keeping or selling drugs) and 228.1 (illegally obtaining, keeping, carrying weapons, explosives) of the Criminal Code. Later on during the investigation, they faced extra charge under Criminal Code's article 220.1 (the organization of mass disorders accompanied with violence, breaking, arson, destruction of property, application of fire-arms, explosives, and also rendering of armed resistance to representative of authority, or participation in such disorders). On 6 May 2014 the Baku Court of Grave Crimes sentenced all the young men to 6–8 years of imprisonment. International human rights organization, Amnesty International, recognized all the arrested young men as prisoners of conscience. Shahin Novruzlu and Bakhtiyar Guliyev were pardoned and released on 17 October 2014, while the later defected to the government right after his release. The next pardon came on 30 December 2014 when two more activists Uzeyir Mammadli and Zaur Gurbanli were released. The rest of the activists, Rashadat Akhundov, Rashad Hasanov, Mammad Azizov and Omar Mammadov were pardoned and released on 17 March 2016 ahead of Ilham Aliyev's Washington visit for the Nuclear Security Summit. The last imprisoned member of the movement Ilkin Rustamzade was pardoned and released from jail in March 2019.
