= Taxation in Azerbaijan =

The tax legislation of Azerbaijan comprises the Constitution of Azerbaijan, the Tax Code and legal standards which are adopted herewith. The taxes levied in Azerbaijan can be generally broken down into 3 main types: state taxes, taxes of autonomy republic and local (municipal) taxes. State taxes include the following: personal income tax, corporate tax, value added tax, excise tax, property tax, land tax, road tax, mineral royalty tax and simplified tax. Taxes of autonomy republic are the same as state taxes but levied in Nakhichevan Autonomous Republic.

The Tax Code of Azerbaijan Republic was approved on 11 July 2000 and consists of two parts. The General Part indicates the rights and responsibilities of taxpayers, tax agents and tax authorities, procedures of tax registration, tax control and audit. The second part, also referred to as Special Section, defines specific taxes and their bases, rates, payment schedules and procedures. There exist separate taxation procedures for Production Sharing Agreements (PSAs).

From 2010, the government revenues from taxes started to rise. Thus, in 2014, tax revenues as percentage from GDP totaled 14.213%. Highest shares of tax revenues came from value added tax and corporate profit taxes in 2014. In 2015, tax revenues as percentage of GDP were equal to 15.6%.

The central executive body which provides the implementation and control of tax policies in the country, collection and transfer of tax payments into the government budget is Ministry of Taxes of Azerbaijan Republic.

== Tax Regime ==
Currently, Azerbaijan has 3 distinct tax regimes. These are the following: statutory tax regime, tax regime that relates to companies operating under Production Sharing Agreements and tax regime that relates to companies operating under Host Government Agreements.

The statutory tax regime is applicable to all companies operating in Azerbaijan, except for those, who are involved into oil and gas industry.

The regime related to Production Sharing Agreements covers the rules for more than twenty existing PSAs. Milli Majlis has ratified these PSAs.

The rules related to Baku-Tbilisi-Ceyhan oil export and South Caucasus pipelines are covered by Host Government Agreements tax regime.

== Tax Procedures ==
The tax year in Azerbaijan starts in January, 1st and ends in December, 31st. The tax declaration has to be filled in and submitted by enterprises no later than 31 March following the calendar year and users of simplified tax should submit the declaration no later than 20 April. Natural persons who have stayed in Azerbaijan 182 days in a calendar year are accounted as residents and are responsible for paying the taxes. Residents of Azerbaijan are taxable on their international income, whereas non-residents are taxable on the Azerbaijani source income only.

Taxes can be withhold from people who are related to employment activities, as well as non-entrepreneurial activities such as interest income, dividends, capital gains and royalties.

Agricultural income, gifts and inheritance from family members, capital gains, income from crafts production, lottery prizes, alimonies and compensation receipts are exempt from taxation. Standard deductions are applicable for war heroes, their families and military officials.

== Tax Registration ==
Both individual entrepreneurs and legal entities must be registered by the tax authority (State Tax Service) and obtain Tax Identification Number. Under 'one-stop-shop' principle, no separate social security, corporate, statistical or other registrations needed; that is, tax registration will be sufficient for such related purposes and no separate application or procedures are needed. Only after obtaining TIN a business/corporate bank account may be opened.

In practice, the following steps are taken in order to fully complete tax and business registration processes: - The type of business or company is selected - The company name is determined - The charter and incorporation documents are prepared - Shareholders, the capital structure and the director are determined - The legal address is determined. - The tax regime is selected. - An application is submitted through the State Tax Service. - A registration certificate is obtained from the state register and a TIN is assigned. - A bank account is opened. - The required capital is paid. - If the field of activity requires a license or permit, these are obtained. - If there are employees, employment contracts, work permits and social security obligations are fulfilled.

== State Taxes ==
=== Income tax from individuals ===
Income taxes in Azerbaijan are set at progressive rate. The taxable base for residents is income which has been earned in or outside of Azerbaijan. For non-residents income which is taxed are the following – income which is both connected and not connected with employment and also all other kinds of income which are not tax-exempt or arose from revaluation of assets. Tax rate on income of natural persons receiving less than 2500 AZN is 14%, if income is more than 2500 AZN, then 25% tax is levied on the proportion which is exceeding 2500 AZN.

=== Profit tax from legal persons ===
Profit is defined as the difference between income and expenses. The profits of all resident-enterprises should be taxed. If legal person is permanently established in Azerbaijan – then its profits should be taxed. Otherwise, it should be taxed at the source of payment without subtracting its expenses. Gains, which arise from revaluation of assets are not subject to taxation. The profits are taxed at 20% rate.

=== Value Added Tax ===
Value Added Tax (VAT) rate is 18%. All works, goods, services provided and taxable imports constitute the base for taxation. There also exists zero (0) rate VAT in the country for the issues related with financial aids, diplomacy, cargo and valuable goods.

=== Excise Tax ===
Excise taxes are indirect taxes which are included in the sales price of goods. All excise goods that are produced or imported to Azerbaijan are subject to taxation. Alcohol and all types of alcoholic beverages, tobacco products, light vehicles, leisure and sports floating transports, imported platinum, gold and jewelry are subject to excise tax. There is no fixed tax rate for all types of goods, instead, there are different rates for each of the product and its amounts. For example, wine and vineyard materials are taxed at 0.1 AZN per liter.

=== Property Tax ===
Taxable base of property tax for physical persons are the value of buildings and their parts, any water and air transportation or facility. For legal enterprises it is only average annual value of fixed assets. The rates are specified based on the area where buildings are located. Thus, for Baku it is 0.4 AZN per each square meter, Gyandja, Sumgait, and Absheron regions – 0.3 AZN, other cities and regions – 0.2 AZN, cities and towns of regional subordination – 0.1 AZN.

=== Tax on land ===
Residents, as well as non-residents and businesses are obliged to register for paying taxes after proving their rights to use the land, and regardless of the results of economic activities on the land itself it is mandatory to pay land tax. The tax rates differ by the purpose of use and the area where the land is located. Generally, the tax rates are higher for the big and industrial cities. Land tax rates for agricultural use is 0.06 AZN for each conventional point.

=== Taxes to the Road ===
The taxable base for this type of tax constitutes the motor vehicles which are imported to the country by non-residents and are used for transportation, as well as all motor fuels, diesel that has been either produced or imported to Azerbaijan Republic for domestic use. Taxes for motor cars are calculated depending on engine cubic capacity and period of presence, for buses – number of seats and period of presence, for trucks – number of axis and period of presence. Generally, these taxes may vary from US$20 to US$2800 and higher. For transportation, delivering dangerous cargo there is specific procedure of calculation.

=== Royalty (Mining Tax) ===
These taxes are paid by physical entities and enterprises which extract mineral resources from the territory of Azerbaijan Republic, including area of Caspian Sea which belongs to the country. Tax rates for crude oil is 26%, natural gas – 20%, all types of metals – 3%.

=== Simplified Tax ===
Simplified tax is applicable to entities, whose volume of transactions does not exceed 200.000 AZN in 12 consecutive months. Gross volume of revenue received in respect of goods and services provided is subject to taxation. Simplified tax rate is – 2% (applicable when the annual revenue is below 200 000 azn); for public catering activity where the annual revenue is above 200 000 az – 8%.

When taxpayers are engaged in sales to commercial entities and private entrepreneurs (buyers for commercial use) along with individual customers (buyers for personal use), where income from buyers for commercial use is less than 30 percent of total sales, they would also be entitled to pay simplified tax with the rate of 2%. https://www.caspianlegalcenter.az/insights/more/corporate-tax-azerbaijan

== See also ==
- Ministry of Taxes of Azerbaijan Republic
- Economy of Azerbaijan
- Economic development in Azerbaijan
- Tax Code of Azerbaijan
