= Azerbaijani name =

In the Republic of Azerbaijan, an Azerbaijani name typically consists of an ad (name), ata adı (patronymic), and soyad (surname), following Russian/Soviet-influenced naming customs. This article focuses on Azeri names as used in Azerbaijan; elsewhere, conventions for Azeri personal names may differ.

== Law ==
Names are regulated by the Civil Code of Azerbaijan. Besides name and surname, patronymics are also in use, but mostly in legal documents, not in daily use. For example, while Ilham Aliyev is known by his name and surname, his full name is Ilham Haydar oghlu Aliyev (oghlu means son). Likewise, for women the patronymic form qızı (meaning daughter, sometimes exonymized as gyzy) is used, as in Sakina Abbas qızı Aliyeva. It is prohibited to give insulting, sarcastic or non-gender names to children by law. Children automatically inherit their parents' surname upon registration. However, children may change their surname suffixes by age of 10 by their own will. Full name change is only accepted after turning 18, when citizens can change their name, surname and even patronymic name as Family Code allows. Same law also allows complete removal of surnames leaving only first name and patronymic names, however their legal surname would change to XXX as a standard, to avoid problems with surname-less passports.

== Given names ==
Azerbaijani names include names with Turkic (e.g. Turkish name), Germanic, Slavic, Persian, Arabic and Caucasian origin. There are several published onomastic dictionaries in Azerbaijani including more than 15,000 names. However, there are officially recorded 180,000 different names in registrar of Ministry of Justice. Names are mostly gender specific; however, new females names could be invented by adding -ə to a male name (for example, male name Ilham could easily be converted into a female name Ilhama). Unlike Turkish names, Azeri name are limited by law to one name per child. However, there are compound names like Mammadhasan (made of Mammad and Hasan) or Aliakber (made of Ali and Akber).

=== Most popular names in 2010-2015 period ===
Male	Popularity (per person)	Female	Popularity (per person)
Yusif	20436	Zahra	19405
Ali	13953	Nuray	15559
Huseyn	13925	Fatima	14446

== Surname origins ==
Highly influenced by Russian naming customs, as use of surnames in Azerbaijan started in the 1900s with the Russian Empire; most surnames end with suffixes -ов (-ov), -ев (-yev) meaning "belonging to". Before Russian rule, Azerbaijanis were known usually by their respective clan or tribal names, but Stalinist rule speeded up arbitrary Russification of these surnames. For example, if brothers Ali, Hasan and Huseyn were children of the same father, their children were surnamed respectively Aliyev, Hasanov and Huseynov, which can cause problems in pedigree research.

=== Clan surnames ===
Certain surnames derives from clan names of old nobility such as Safavi, Bakikhanov and others. Most of these were already adopted by nobility in early stages of Russian Empire domination in Caucasus. Older surnames also have suffix -ski like Shikhlinski, Hajinski, Hamidlinski, Arablinski, etc. Others mostly incorporate noble titles like bey or khan with addition of suffixes like -ov or -li (for instance, Rustamkhanli or Amirkhanov).

=== Profession surnames ===
Such surnames were historically derived from profession of progenitor of family. For example, Sarkarov would mean that progenitor of family was a tax collector.

=== Toponymic surnames ===
This type of surnames are made up with person's birthplace. For example, Seyid Azim Shirvani was born in Shirvan.

=== Suffixes ===
Besides -ov and -yev, there are other surname suffixes: -li^{4}, -zadeh, -soy and -gil. Adopted from Slavic naming customs, -ov/-yev is gender specific suffix (for females, these would be -ova/-yeva). However, the rest are unisex. Least popular and relatively new suffixes are -soy and -gil. Patronymic names can also be converted into surnames. For example, if desired, Ali Huseyn oghlu (meaning Huseyn's son Ali) can be converted into full name like Ali Huseynoghlu but his descendants will carry surname Huseynoghlu as well, even if their father is not named Huseyn.

=== Suffixless surnames ===
Much like Turkish names Azerbaijani law also accepts suffixless surnames, exceptions are surnames including noble titles like Agha, Khan or Bey.

=== Specific cases ===
Children born out of wedlock can still bear surnames of their biological parents even if they are not married, they have same rights as any other children. If the father is not known, any children will carry their matrineal surname.

== Minority names ==
There are several law prohibitions for names, but none of those apply to ethnic minorities and they are free to use names according to their cultures. This means ethnic Azerbaijanis cannot name their daughters Elizabeth or their sons George but ethnic Russian citizens can.

== See also ==
- Tatar name
- Turkish name
