= Mehdi bey Hajinski =

Azerbaijani statesman

Mehdi bey Hajinski Mehdi bəy Hacinski
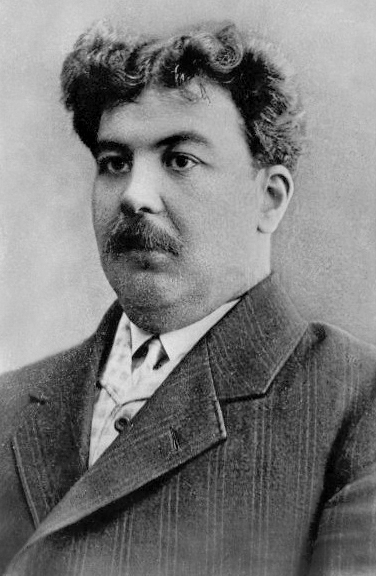

State Controller of Azerbaijan Democratic Republic (ADR)
- In office October 6, 1918 – December 7, 1918
- President: Fatali Khan Khoyski Prime Minister, (Chairman of Azerbaijani Parliament)
- Preceded by: Abdulali bey Amirjanov
- Succeeded by: Nariman bey Narimanbeyov

Personal details
- Born: 1879 Baku, Azerbaijan
- Died: 1941 (aged 61–62) Baku, Azerbaijan

Mehdi bey Hajinski Suleyman bey oglu (Azerbaijani: Mehdi bəy Hacinski Süleyman bəy oğlu; 1879–1941) was an Azerbaijani actor, publicist and statesman who served as the State Controller of Azerbaijan Democratic Republic and first general secretary of Parliament of Azerbaijan, and was a member of Azerbaijani National Council.

== Early years ==
Hajinski was born in 1879 in Baku, Azerbaijan. Since 1906, he was the director of the theater department of charity society Nijat and from 1914 he was deputy director of theater department of Sefa society. Considered a noble writer, Hajinski published numerous articles about the Azerbaijani theater, arts and culture of the country, Since 1908, he also acted on stage. He was the person who first awarded Uzeyir Hajibeyov for his Leyli and Majnun opera.

== Political career ==
Upon the dissolution of Transcaucasian Democratic Federative Republic, Hajinski became a member of the Presidium of Azerbaijani National Council, an interim body of the government which proclaimed the independence of Azerbaijan Democratic Republic on May 28, 1918. When the first Azerbaijani Parliament convened on December 7, 1918 Hajinski was elected the first deputy of Alimardan Topchubashev and chief secretary of the parliament. When the third cabinet of Azerbaijan Democratic Republic was formed by Fatali Khan Khoyski, Hajinski was appointed State Controller of ADR.

After Bolshevik take over of Azerbaijan, Hajinski remained in the country. He died in Baku in 1941.

== See also ==
- Azerbaijani National Council
- Cabinets of Azerbaijan Democratic Republic (1918-1920)
- Current Cabinet of Azerbaijan Republic
- Hajinski
