= Ali Yusif =

- Əli Yusif
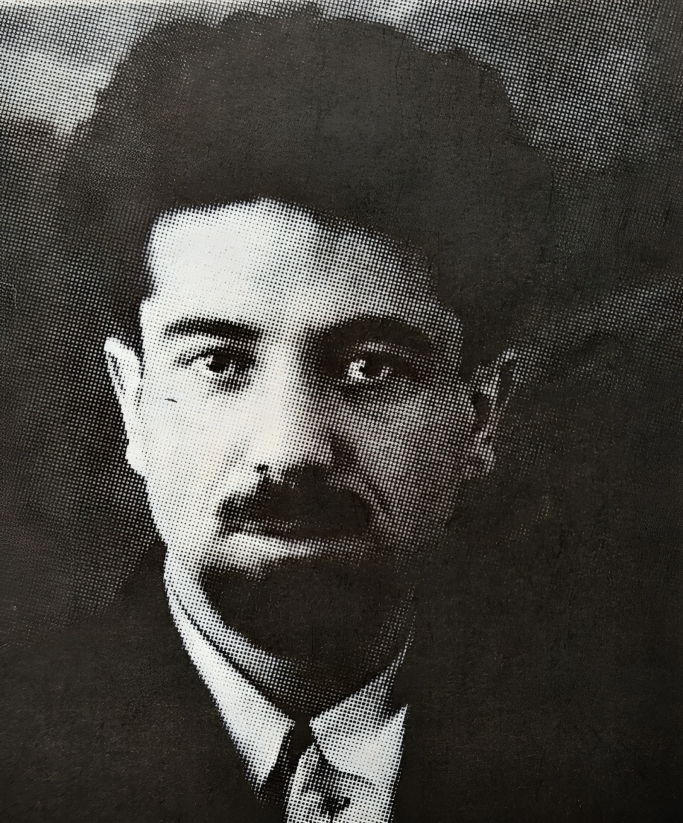
- Ali Yusif in the 1930s
- Born: Aghaali Yusifzade; January 1, 1900. Shusha, Shusha uezd, Elizavetpol Governorate
- Died: August 18, 1937 (aged 37); Tashkent, Uzbek SSR, USSR
- Cause of death: was executed by shooting
- Resting place: unknown
- Citizenship: Russian Empire; Azerbaijan Democratic Republic; USSR
- Education: Shusha Realni School; Sciences Po
- Occupations: Poet; politician; journalist
- Writing career
- Pen name: Ali Yusif Rai

Ali Yusif, Ali Yusif Rai, Ali Yusifzade, or Aghaali Yusifzade — Azerbaijani poet, politician, student of the ADR, member of the Central Committee of the Secret Musavat, victim of repression.

From the age of 11, he appeared in the press with his translations and poems. After the establishment of the Azerbaijan Democratic Republic, he began working as a dragoman in the Government Chancellery. He was a member of the board of the “Green Pen” society and of the editorial board of "Azerbaijan", the official state newspaper of the Azerbaijan Democratic Republic. By a special decision of the Parliament of the Azerbaijan Democratic Republic, he was sent abroad at state expense to pursue higher education. He received his higher education at the School of Political Sciences in Paris.

After completing his studies, he returned to Baku. He was appointed executive secretary of "Maarif va Medeniyyet", a journal of the Ministry of Education of the Azerbaijan SSR, and was active in the Azerbaijan Society for Research and Study and the Azerbaijan Terminology Committee. He was one of the 21 founding members of the Azerbaijan Literature Society. In addition, he joined the secretly operating Musavat Party in Baku and, in 1923, was elected a member of the Central Committee of the Secret Musavat.

Although he was first arrested in 1924, he was released after a few months. In 1926, he was arrested for the second time and sentenced to 10 years of imprisonment, being exiled to the Solovetsky Islands. During his exile, he carried out propaganda among Musavatist prisoners and took part in organizing them. Although he was released in 1935, he was not allowed to return to Baku and was instead exiled to Tashkent, where he worked for some time as an accountant in the Food Trade Department. In 1937, he was arrested again by the NKVD and, by decision of the NKVD troika, was executed together with his associates.

He was the son of Mirza Jalal Yusifzade a poet, writer, member of the National Council of the Azerbaijan Democratic Republic, and one of the founders of the secret anti-Soviet organization “Independent Azerbaijan,” established in 1928.

== Life ==
=== Early years ===
Aghaali Jalal oghlu Yusifzade was born on 1 January 1900 in the city of Shusha. From 1911 he was engaged in creative activity. He first translated Ivan Krylov’s poem “Two Ploughs” into Azerbaijani, and this translation was published in 1911 in the 3rd issue of the newspaper "Ishig". In the following issues of the newspaper, works written by Ali Yusifzade himself such as “The Fish and the Cat” and “The Difference of Mothers” were also published. In addition to publishing his writings in newspapers and journals, he also participated in a number of literary competitions. In 1915 the journal Gurtulush in Baku announced a competition on the topic “The Condemnation of an Orphan at Sunset”. Ali Yusifzade also took part in the competition. For the first time he appeared there with the signature “Ali Yusif Rai”. Among the winners were Jafar Jabbarly, Ummugulsum and Ali Yusifzade. In 1917 he completed his secondary education at the Shusha Real School. In 1917 he became a member of the Musavat party. After the October Revolution he became a member of the Shusha National Committee established in Shusha. At the beginning of 1918, by the assignment of the National Committee, he went to Batum and met with Enver Pasha.

=== In the Azerbaijan Republic ===
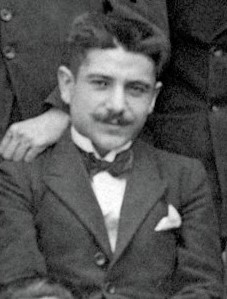
May 28, 1920, Paris.

On 28 May 1918 the Azerbaijan Republic was established. Ali Yusif bey, who came to Baku, began to work as a dragoman in the Chancellery of the Government of the Azerbaijan Republic because he knew English, French, and Russian. In addition, he was a member of the board of the “Green Pen” society. He published articles and poems in the newspapers "Azerbaijan", "Istiglal", "Basirat", and in the journal "Gurtulush yolu". He was a member of the editorial board of the newspaper "Azerbaijan", the official state newspaper of the Azerbaijan Republic. On the occasion of the 1st anniversary of the Azerbaijan Republic, in his article “To the Young Generation” published in the newspaper Azerbaijan, he wrote:

Azerbaijani youth! Be proud, my brother! Among the descendants of Oghuz Khan, you are the first to attain the most civilized form of government — the republican system.

On 1 September 1919, the Parliament of the Azerbaijan Republic adopted a decision to send 100 Azerbaijani young people to foreign higher educational institutions at the state’s expense in the 1919–1920 academic year in order to train highly educated specialist personnel. Seven million manats were allocated for the implementation of this decision. For each student sent to European higher educational institutions, a monthly scholarship of 400 francs and travel expenses amounting to 1000 francs were determined. Ali Yusif was also one of the students sent abroad to receive higher education.

On 14 January 1920, the first group of 24 students sent abroad was seen off at the Baku Railway Station with the participation of members of Parliament and the Government, well-known philanthropists, religious figures, representatives of the public, and parents. Ali Yusif was one of these 24 students. At the end of the ceremony, Ali Yusif spoke on behalf of the students, and afterwards they departed for Batum. The students who arrived in Paris on 11 February were welcomed by the delegation headed by Alimardan bey Topchubashi, who was participating in the Paris Peace Conference. Addressing the students, Alimardan bey gave them advice and wished them success. Afterwards, the students were sent to various cities in Europe to pursue their studies. Ali Yusif enrolled in the School of Political Sciences located in Paris. In 1923 he completed his education and returned from Paris to Baku.

=== In the USSR ===
After returning to Baku, Ali Yusif was appointed responsible secretary of the journal "Maarif va madaniyyat", the press organ of the Ministry of Education of the Azerbaijan SSR. He began to take part in the activities of the Musavat party, which was operating secretly in Baku. In November 1923, together with Dadash Hasanzade, Ahmad Hajinski, Abulfaz Babayev, and Abdulla Abdulzade, he was elected a member of the Central Committee of the Secret Musavat. He was also represented in official institutions operating in the Azerbaijan SSR. He was elected a member of the Enlightenment Union and worked in the Society for the Study and Research of Azerbaijan and in the Azerbaijan Terminology Committee.

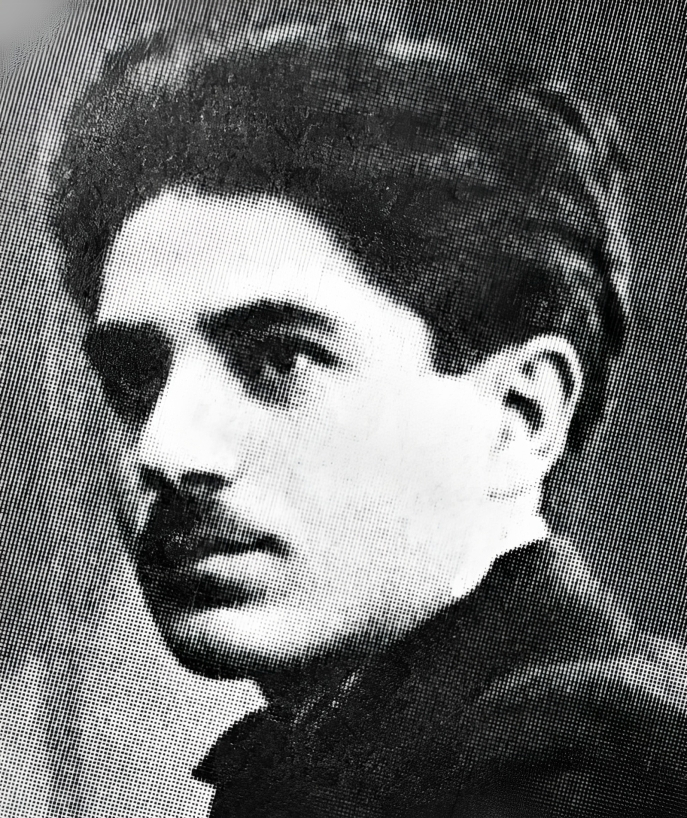

He was arrested on 6 February 1924. After being held for several months in the prison of the Azerbaijan Extraordinary Commission, he was released from arrest in May 1924. In February 1925, he was one of the 21 founding members of the Azerbaijan Literary Society.

In February–March 1926, at the First Turkological Congress held in Baku, Ali Yusif participated as a secretary, while his father, Mirza Jalal, took part as a translator. Three days after the congress concluded, on March 11, by order of an employee of the Azerbaijan Extraordinary Commission, Vasin, searches were conducted in the homes of Ahmad Hajinski, Dadash Hasanzadeh, and Ali Yusif, after which they were arrested. Ali Yusif’s investigation continued until February 28, 1927. During this period, he was interrogated 12 times. On February 28, he was sentenced to 10 years of imprisonment and exiled to the Solovki Islands. Ali Yusif arrived in Solovki in March 1927 together with Isfandiyar Vakilli, Abdul Muin Niyazi, Mehdi Sultanzadeh, Sadiq Imane, Nasrulla Israfilzadeh, and Movsum bey Beydamirzadeh. He carried out propaganda activities among the Musavatists in the prison camp and participated in their organization. He later became one of the main organizers of several hunger strikes held in the camp. Aliafsar Najafov, Ibrahim Akhundzada, Xasay Karimzada and Jahangir Agayev were among the prisoners that died during the hunger strike

In January 1935, Ali Yusif was released from exile. However, he was not allowed to return to Azerbaijan and was instead exiled to Uzbek SSR. For some time, he worked as an accountant in the Food Trade Department in the city of Tashkent.

On July 10, 1937, he was arrested by the NKVD of the Uzbek SSR. He was accused of engaging in counter-revolutionary activities since 1917, of continuing this struggle during his exile, of being a member of the Musavat Central Committee established in prison camps, and of being one of the organizers of hunger strikes and protest actions in the camps. Additionally, he was accused of maintaining contact, after his release, with Musavatists remaining in the camps as well as those living in Tashkent, and of intending to establish a nationalist organization composed of Azerbaijanis in Tashkent.

Ali Yusif rejected these accusations. By the decision of the NKVD troika, Ali Yusif, along with Jalilbey Sultanov, Alish Khanbudagov, and Isa Agayev, was executed by shooting on August 18, 1937. The place of Ali Yusif’s burial is unknown.

Ali Yusif bey was posthumously acquitted on May 22, 1992, after the restoration of Azerbaijan’s independence.

== Reminiscences ==
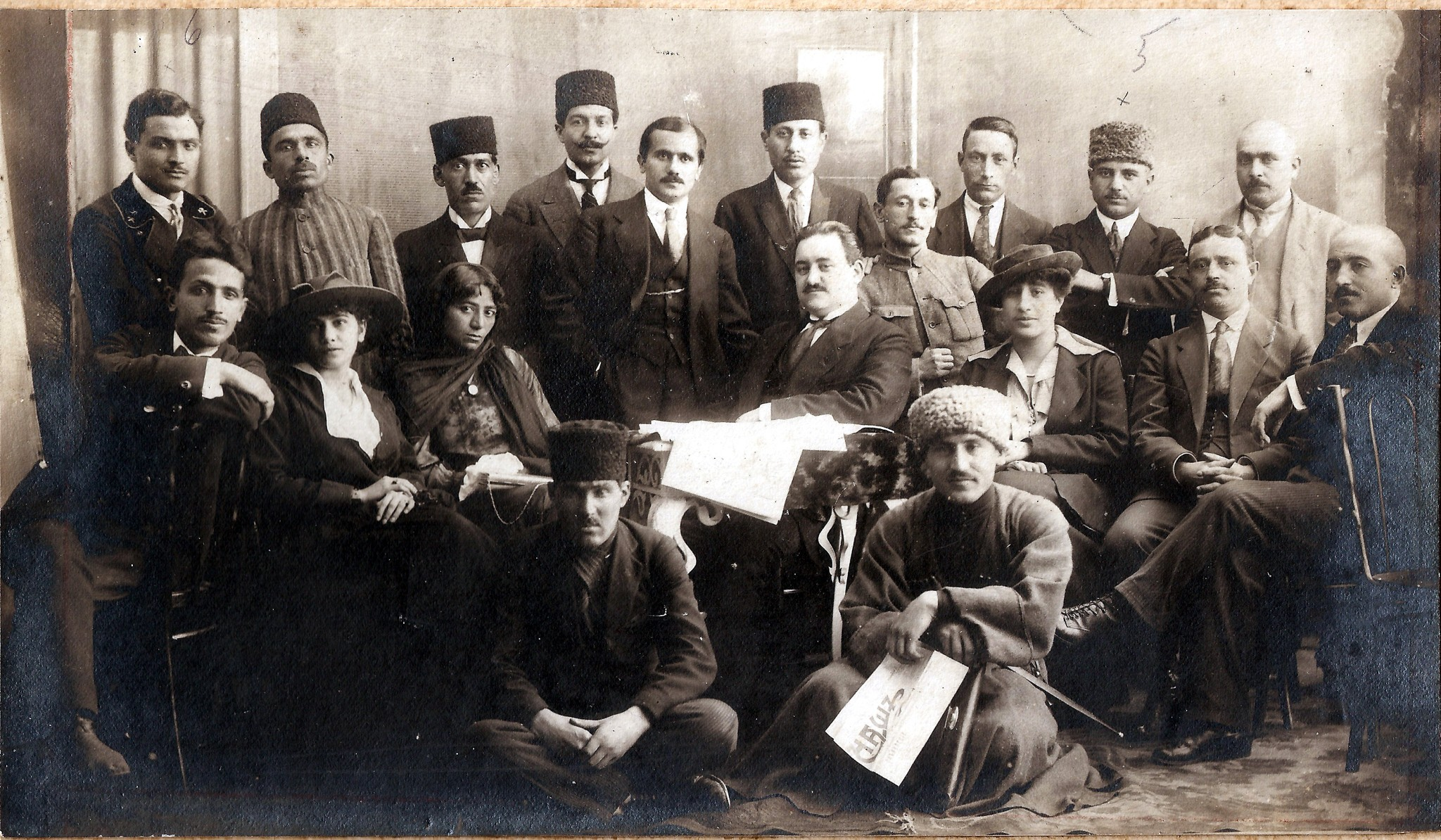
Editorial staff of the newspaper "Azerbaijan" (1919). Ali Yusif is the second from the right in the back row.

Abdulvahab Yurdsever, one of the founders of the Secret Musavat organization and head of the Azerbaijani National Center, wrote a series of articles titled “Scenes from Azerbaijan’s Struggle for Independence” in the journal "Azerbaycan", published by the Azerbaijan Cultural Society. These articles discussed individuals and organizations that resisted the Soviet occupation in Azerbaijan after the April invasion. In one of these writings, he also mentioned Ali Yusif:

Ali Yusif was the son of the late Mirza Jalal Yusifzade, one of the leading and enlightened figures of Garabagh. Both father and son were poets, and both were members of the Musavat Party.

Ali Yusif was among the students sent by the independent Azerbaijani government to Europe for higher education, and he graduated from the Faculty of Political Science at the Sorbonne University in Paris. On his way back to Azerbaijan via Istanbul, although friends warned him that he might be eliminated in the occupied homeland like other prominent intellectuals, he reportedly said, “My duty awaits me there,” and upon arriving in Baku, he immediately joined the struggle by meeting Mirza Bala in the very first weeks.

After returning from Paris to Baku, I encountered him in front of the late Murtuza Mukhtarov’s house. He embraced me warmly, saying, “I have come to help!” Indeed, our organizations gained great strength through him. After our first meeting, we met again in September 1923 at the home of the late Dadash Hasanzadeh. Our third meeting, as I noted earlier, took place in 1927 in the GPU prison. Each time, I observed in Ali Yusif a profound faith in resistance and an inexhaustible determination to struggle. He was among the members of the Second Central Committee.

== Family ==
The Yusifzade family traces its name back to Mirza Agha Yusif, a poet and scholar who lived in Shusha during the reign of Karabakh Khan Ibrahim Khalil and was close to the palace. His son, Haji Mirza Alakbar, was also born in Shusha. After receiving his initial education from his father, he went to the city of Najaf to continue his studies. Upon returning from Najaf, he taught in Shusha and authored several books.

Haji Mirza Alakbar’s son, and also the father of Ali Yusif, Mirza Jalal Yusifzade, was a poet and writer. He was the publisher of the first newspaper published in the Tajik language, and one of the 44 members of the National Council of the Azerbaijan Democratic Republic. He participated as a translator in the First Turkological Congress held in Baku in 1926. He was one of the founding members of the secret anti-Soviet organization “Independent Azerbaijan,” established in 1928. He passed away in Baku in 1931.

Mirza Jalal Yusifzade was married twice. His first marriage was to Leyla Khanum, and they had three children: Sahba, Ali, and Shahla. After Leyla Khanum passed away, Mirza Jalal married Ziba Khanum, the daughter of his uncle Abdulali. From this marriage, two children were born: Dilgushe in 1908 and Alim in 1917.

Ali Yusif’s brother, Alim Yusifzade, was born in 1917. He served in the military in 1938, completed officer school, and was discharged in 1940. During World War II, he was called back to the army in 1941 and sent to the Counterintelligence School for training. After completing his studies, he participated in combat as part of the 219th Rifle Division. He took part in the battles of Stalingrad, Orel-Kursk, and in the liberation of Kharkiv, Kyiv, and Prague. Later, he was sent to Mongolia and participated in battles against the Japanese Empire. After World War II, in 1948, he took part in the capture of Changchun in China. For his bravery, he was awarded three orders, including the “Order of the Patriotic War”, "Order of the Red Star", and the “Medal for Victory over Japan", along with 14 other medals. From the 1950s onwards, he worked at the Institute of Foreign Languages as head of department, dean, and vice-rector at different times. He passed away in Baku on March 23, 2001.
