= Sakina Aliyeva =

Azerbaijani-Soviet politician

- Səkinə Əliyeva
- Born: Sakina Abbas qızı Aliyeva; 15 April 1925; Nakhchivan, Nakhichevan Autonomous Soviet Socialist Republic, Azerbaijan Soviet Socialist Republic
- Died: 6 October 2010 (aged 85); Baku, Azerbaijan
- Other names: Sakina Alieva, Sakina Abbas kyzy Alieva, Sakina Abbas kyzy Aliyeva
- Occupations: stateswoman and politician
- Known for: 1st declaration of secession from the USSR: break-away independence attempt for the Nakhchivan Autonomous Republic

Sakina Aliyeva (Azerbaijani: Səkinə Abbas qızı Əliyeva, Russian: Сакина Аббас кызы Алиева 15 April 1925 – 6 October 2010) was an Azerbaijani-Soviet politician. From 1951, she served in various capacities in the Nakhchivan Regional Committee of the Communist Party. In 1963, she was elected Chair of the Presidium of the Supreme Soviet of the Nakhchivan Autonomous Soviet Socialist Republic and served in that capacity until 1990. In January of that year, with the dissolution of the Soviet Union Aliyeva presented the declaration for Nakhchivan to secede from the USSR in protest of the Soviet actions during "Black January". During her career, she was awarded the Order of the October Revolution, the Order of the Red Banner of Labor, and an Honorary Decree of Merit from the Presidium of the Supreme Soviet of the Nakhchivan Autonomous Soviet Socialist Republic.

== Early life ==
Sakina Aliyeva, officially Sakina Abbas qızı Aliyeva meaning Sakina daughter of Abbas Aliyeva, was born on 15 April 1925 in Nakhchivan, located in the Nakhichevan Autonomous Soviet Socialist Republic, which was officially part of the Azerbaijan Soviet Socialist Republic to Almaz and Abbas Aliyev. Her father was a laborer and her mother raised the couple's three children — two daughters and a son. She studied at the Nakhchivan Teachers Institute and went on to further her education at the Azerbaijan State University, and Higher Party School, completing her schooling in 1945.

== Career ==
As soon as she graduated, Aliyeva joined the Statistical Institute, where she taught in the Soviet system until 1951. Promoted to the Agitprop in that year, she first worked as an instructor in the propaganda department of the Nakhchivan Regional Committee of the Communist Party. She was later promoted to head the department, before being promoted to lead the lecturer's group. In 1958, Aliyeva became the Minister of Education for the Nakhchivan Autonomous Soviet Socialist Republic as a member of the Supreme Soviet of the Soviet Union, serving in that capacity until 1961, when she became the secretary of the Party's Nakhchivan Regional Committee.

In 1963, Aliyeva was elected as the deputy of the Supreme Soviet of Azerbaijan SSR representing the Nakhchivan Autonomous Republic. That same year, she was elected as Chair of the Presidium of the Supreme Soviet of the Nakhchivan Autonomous SSR In 1964, Aliyeva was simultaneously selected as Deputy Chair of the Presidium of the Supreme Soviet of the Azerbaijan SSR. She was well-known for her focus on improving the status of women and involving more women in Azerbaijani politics, but she also devoted attention to the socio-economic problems of Nakhchivan. She instituted programs to raise the standard of living and address civil protections for the populace of the autonomous republic. In the 1970s and 1980s, she was recognized with multiple awards, including the Order of the October Revolution, the Order of the Red Banner of Labor, and an Honorary Decree of Merit from the Presidium of the Supreme Soviet of the Nakhchivan Autonomous Soviet Socialist Republic.

In 1986, with the assertion of Glasnost policies by Soviet General Secretary Mikhail Gorbachev, ethnic tensions, which had been smoldering between Azerbaijani and Armenian populations for decades, resurfaced when Karabakh separatists saw an opportunity to reorganize the region. Organizing a series of ethnically motivated attacks and demonstrations, the separatists goal was to reclaim Armenian jurisdiction of the Nagorno-Karabakh region, which was within the borders of Azerbaijan. In Azerbaijan, a similar organization emerged to agitate for Azerbaijani sovereignty, the Popular Front. The initial Soviet response was to support the Azerbaijan jurisdiction, as they appeared more loyal to the state. With the dissolution of the Soviet Union, authorities came to believe that backing Armenia in the conflict would promote longer-term fields of influence. Declaring a state of emergency, Soviet troops moved into Baku on 20 January 1990, with the intent of stopping the independence movement from overthrowing the Soviet Azerbaijani government.

In protest to the Soviet actions during "Black January" and their backing of Armenia, as head of the Presidium for the Nakhchivan Autonomous SSR, Aliyeva called a special session of the Supreme Soviet of the Nakhchivan ASSR. After debating the legalities of whether Nakhchivan could secede from the USSR under Article 81 of the Soviet Constitution, the deputies prepared a declaration of independence. Aliyeva signed the first secession proclamation by any territory of the former USSR and presented the declaration of independence on television. The declaration was quickly denounced by Afiyaddin Jalilov, who claimed Aliyeva had only signed the agreement under duress, forced by gunmen. She was forced to resign from her post in March 1990 and was replaced by Jalilov. In 2003, Farida Laman a well-known Azerbaijani writer, wrote Azadlıq carçısı (Herald of Freedom), the biography of Aliyeva's life.

== Death and legacy ==
Aliyeva died on 6 October 2010. A few months after her death, a film of her life Очень любим вас (We love you very much) was released by producer Beyugaga Mamedov of the film studio "Salname". In 2015, an event held at the held at Tabriz Hotel in Nakhchivan paid homage to Aliyeva on what would have been her 90th birthday.
