= Bukhara-yi Sharif =

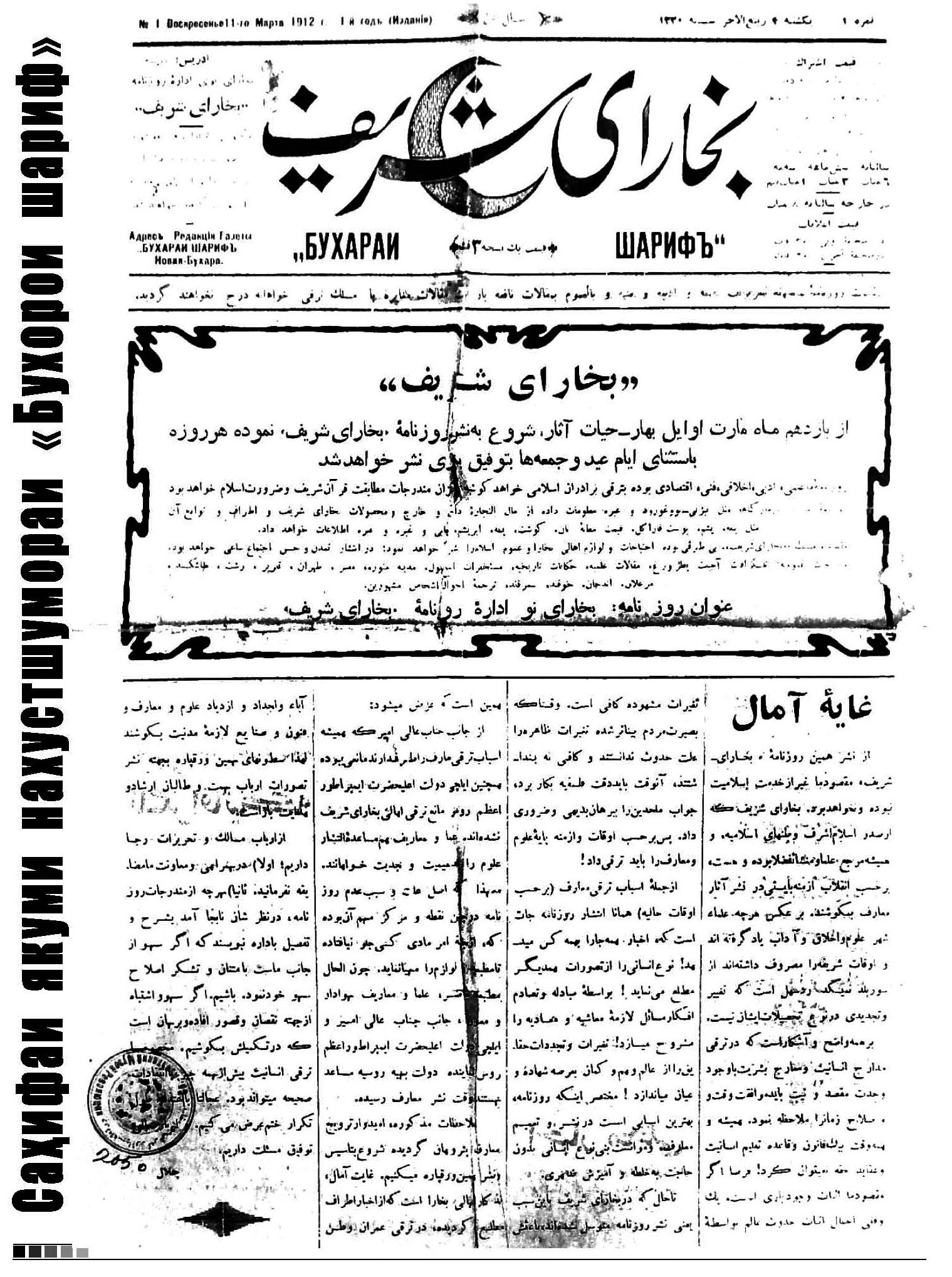
- A page of the Bukhara-yi Sharif
- Type: Weekly
- Founder(s): Six Bukharans, six Russians, and three Persians
- Editor: Mirza Jalal Yusifzade
- Founded: 24 March 1912
- Political alignment: Jadidism
- Language: Persian
- Ceased publication: 15 January 1913
- City: Novaya Bukhara (Kagan)
- Country: Emirate of Bukhara

Bukhara-yi Sharif (Persian: بخارای شریف, romanized: The Noble Bukhara) was the first Persian newspaper in Central Asia, published in the Emirate of Bukhara, which was a protectorate of the Russian Empire. It was active from 24 March 1912 to 15 January 1913.

Based in Novaya Bukhara (Kagan), near Bukhara, it was published by the Jadids with Russian support. The Bukhara-yi Sharif appeared six times weekly during the first four months, then three times, and finally just twice in the last months. The newspaper was an outlet of the Jadid Young Bukharans, even though this was never stated explicitly.

The group that started the newspaper was composed of six Bukharans, six Russians, and three Persians. Its editor was Mirza Jalal Yusifzade, a Shia Muslim journalist from the Caucasus, who had authored several educational and literary works in both Persian and Turkic.

Leaders of the Bukharan modernist intellectual movement, including prominent authors like Abdurauf Fitrat and Sadriddin Ayni, followed the newspaper.

== Sources ==
- Adel, Gholamali Haddad; Elmi, Mohammad Jafar; Taromi-Rad, Hassan (2012). Periodicals of the Muslim World: An Entry from Encyclopaedia of the World of Islam. EWI Press Ltd. ISBN 978-1908433107.
- Bergne, Paul (2007). The Birth of Tajikistan: National Identity and the Origins of the Republic. Bloomsbury Publishing. ISBN 978-1845112837.
- Foltz, Richard (2019). A History of the Tajiks: Iranians of the East. New York: Bloomsbury Publishing. ISBN 978-1784539559.
- Rzehak, Lutz (2023). "How Tajik was made into a national language". In Ido, Shinji; Mahmoodi-Bakhtiari, Behrooz (eds.). Tajik Linguistics. De Gruyter. pp. 1–44. ISBN 978-3110619409.
- Zand, Michael (1989). "Boḵārā-ye šarīf". In Yarshater, Ehsan (ed.). Encyclopædia Iranica (Online ed.). Encyclopædia Iranica Foundation. ISBN 978-0710091215.
