= Orkhan Nazarli =

Head of the State Tax Service

Personal details
- Born: 5 December 1984 (age 41) Aghdam, Azerbaijan
- Citizenship: Azerbaijan

Nazarli Orkhan Faig oglu (Azerbaijani: Nəzərli Orxan Faiq oğlu) is the Head of the State Tax Service under the Ministry of Economy of the Republic of Azerbaijan, 3rd Degree State Tax Service Advisor.

== Biography ==
5 December 1984 — was born in Aghdam, Aghdam District, Azerbaijan.

2005 — graduated from the Azerbaijan State University of Economics, department of International Economic Relations.

2014 — obtained a Certified Public Accountant license in Alaska, USA.

Married with 3 children.

=== Career ===
- 2003 — started career in the private sector.
- 2005-2015 — held various positions in the international audit company.
- 2015-2016 — Adviser to the Minister of Education of the Republic of Azerbaijan on Economic Affairs.
- 2016-2017 — Deputy Chief of Staff of the Ministry of Education of the Republic of Azerbaijan.
- 2018 — Adviser to the Minister of Taxes of the Republic of Azerbaijan.
- 2019-2020 — Head of the National Revenue Department of the Ministry of Taxes.
- 2020-2021 — Deputy Head of the State Tax Service under the Ministry of Economy of the Republic of Azerbaijan. Since then also fulfilled the duties of the Acting Head until the appointment to the position of the Head of the State Tax Service.
- Since 2021 — Head of the State Tax Service under the Ministry of Economy.
- 2024-2025 — IOTA President.
