= Safa Society =

Azerbaijani NGO

"Safa" Society
- Səfa Cəmiyyəti
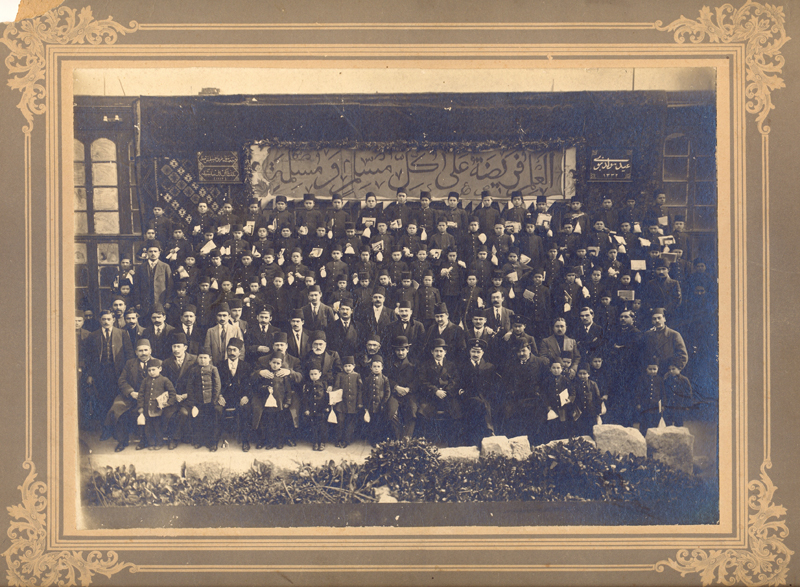
- Celebration of the second anniversary of the school "Safa" (1914)
- Formation: 1910
- Dissolved: 1917
- Type: NGO
- Legal status: charity, foundation,
- Purpose: humanitarian
- Headquarters: Baku

"Safa" Society was a charitable society that operated in Baku at the beginning of the 20th century. The goal of the society was to involve children from poor families in education, to provide medical assistance to the poor, to increase the level of culture of the people.

== Activity ==
The "Safa" society consisted of 50 members. It operated through membership fees, personal donations and funds collected from theatrical performances. The goal of the society was to involve children from poor families in education, to provide medical assistance to the poor, and to raise the level of culture of the people. It operated in a building located on Boyuk Chemberekend Street. The two-storey building of the school was built in 1910 by one of the representatives of the intelligentsia, Alibala Zarbaliyev. He was also the treasurer of the society. Huseyn Javid, Seyid Hussein, Samad Mansur and others taught in the school. At first, there studied 60 students, and in 1914 - already 160.

The society also opened Russian-Tatar (Azerbaijani) schools in the villages of Biləcəri, Bina, Gobu, the village of Devechi, Guba district. It provided financial assistance to schools in Salyan and Shamakhi.

Abbas Mirza Sharifzade on 12 August 1912 was elected to be part of the audit commission of the society.

The newly created theater troupe of the society was weak compared to the troupe of "Nijat" Society, but actors from the "Nijat" also performed in "Safa" troupe. Dadash Bunyadzadeh, Samad Mansur, actors Jahangir Zeynalov, Abbas Mirza Sharifzadeh actively participated in the work of the society. Also Huseyn Arablinsky, Mirzaagha Aliyev, Sidgi Ruhulla, Huseyngulu Sarabsky and others were invited to participate in performances from the troupe of "Nijat" Theater.

The first performance of society's theater troupe took place on 31 August 1912 at Tagiyev Theater. To the attention of the audience was presented the comedy "Agha Karim Khan Ardabili" by Najaf bey Vazirov based on the work of the French playwright Molière - "The Miser". The performance was staged by Jahangir Zeynalov. The main roles were played by Jahangir Zeynalov (Agha Karim Khan Ardabili) and Abbas Mirza Sharifzadeh (son of Agha Karim Khan). The society's theater troupe organized tour performances in the cities and villages of Baku province, as well as in the cities of the South Caucasus, Central Asia, the North Caucasus, Iran, Astrakhan, Kazan and in other regions.

In addition to performances, the "Safa" society was engaged in cultural and educational work related to theatrical life. The society organized the 25th anniversary of Jahangir Zeynalov's stage activity in 1910, the 100th anniversary of the birth of Mirza Fatali Akhundov in 1911, and the 40th anniversary of the literary activity of Najaf-bey Vezirov in 1913.

In 1914, Jahangir Zeynalov was elected the chairman of the theatrical department of the society, and Mehti-bey Hajinsky was elected his deputy. Under his leadership, the theater troupe of the society staged performances based on the works of "Haji Gara" by Mirza Fatali Akhundov, "Haji Gambar" by Najaf-bey Vazirov, "Motherland" by Namik Kemal, "Married Bachelor" by Zulfugar-bey Hajibeyov, in 1914 - "Friends of the Nation" by Abdurrahim-bey Hagverdiyev, "Doctor Willy-nilly" by Molière, in 1915 - the "Fidelity to the Vow" by Namik Kemal, in other years in various troupes - "Farhad and Shirin" (opera) by Mirza Jalal Yusifzade, the "Blacksmith Geve" by Shamsaddin Sami, "Nadir Shah" by Nariman Narimanov.

During the World War I in Baku, the Muslim Charitable Society established 4 shelters for children affected by the war. One of the shelters was located in"Safa" society's school. In addition, the society allocated a one-day income from cinematography to the victims of the war.

In April 1914, the board of the society decided to pay for the education of 25 Muslim students expelled from Kyiv University due to non-payment of the tuition. The funds were allocated from the budget of the society and sent to the rector of the university.

The representatives of the society participated in the "All-Caucasus Congress of Muslim Students", held in May 1917.
