= Mirza Jalal Yusifzade =

Azerbaijani writer

- Azerbaijani: Mirzə Cəlal Yusifzadə
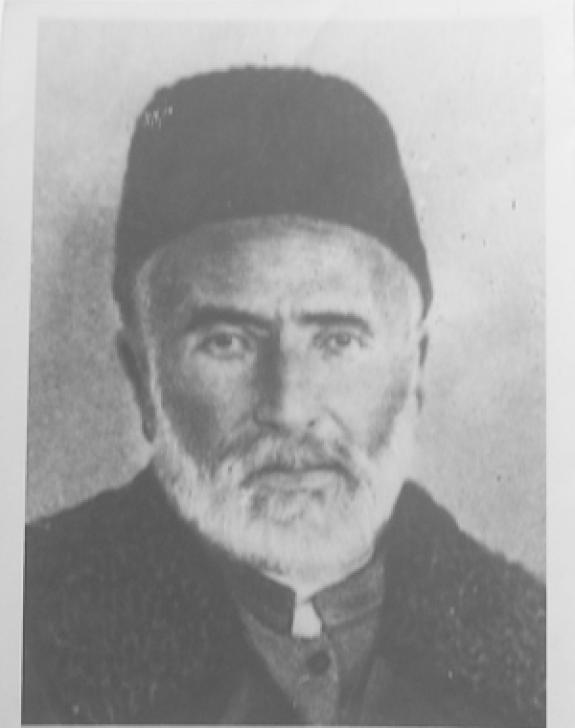
- Born: 1862; Shusha, Shusha uezd, Baku Governorate, Russian Empire
- Died: 1931 (aged 68–69); Shusha, AzSSR, SFSR, USSR
- Writing career
- Language: Azerbaijani Turkic; Persian

Mirza Jalal Yusifzade (Azerbaijani: Mirzə Cəlal Yusifzadə) was an Azerbaijani poet, writer, editor. He was one of the authors of the opera "Farhad and Shirin", and editor of the Bukhara-yi Sharif, the first Persian newspaper in Central Asia.

He was also a member of the National Council of the Republic of Azerbaijan and of the Difai party.

== Life ==
Mirza Jalal Yusifzade was born in 1862 in the city of Shusha. Here he received his primary education and mastered Arabic and Persian. Later he continued his education at madrasah in Tabriz.

== Activity ==
After returning to the country, he was engaged in pedagogical activity for some time. He also enjoyed art, wrote gazelles and poetic stories. He was published in the newspapers Hayat, Irshad, Taza Hayat, Ittifag, Hilal, Asari-hagigat, Sedaye-hagg and others, signing as J.J.Y, Jalal Karabakhi”, “Jalal Yusifi”, “Mirza Jalal Yusifzade”.

On 6 March 1911, the opera "Farhad and Shirin" by Mirza Jalal was staged at the Nikitin brothers' circus in Baku. The libretto was written by Mirza Jalal and the music by the tar player Mirza Zeynal. In Baku, he began being published in the newspaper Khakikati-afkar (Truth of Thought) in native language. The opera's libretto was written by Mirza Jalal Yusifzade under the title "A love story of the story inspired by the works of the late Sheikh Nizami" and published as a 31-page booklet.

Then he was invited to work as the editor of the Persian newspaper Bukhara-yi Sharif, to be published in the city of New Bukhara, whose circulation from March 1912 to January 1913 was 153 copies. He also published a four-page three-week supplement called "Turan" to the newspaper in Uzbek and Turkish languages.

Returning to Baku in 1913, Mirza Jalal Yusifzade worked for the newspapers Sadayi-Khakk (1912-1915) and Igbal (1914–1915). He managed to stage again the opera "Farhad and Shirin" at the "Safa" Dramatic Society. At the beginning of 1918 he was elected deputy of the Transcaucasian Seim. In the National Council of Azerbaijan, he was introduced in Musavat and in the group of democratic neutrals. During the time of the Republic of Azerbaijan, he actively collaborated with the newspaper "Azerbaijan". After the fall of the republic, he worked as a teacher in the Jabrayil district and in Baku. His son Ali Yusif participated in the First Turkological Congress held in Baku in 1926, as a secretary and interpreter.

Mirza Jamal Yusifzade was a member of the Karyagin branch of the Difai party. Mirza Jalal Yusifzade died in Baku in 1931.

== Memory ==
The first brief and accurate information about Mirza Jalal Yusifzade is found in Azerbaijani literature in the book "Tazkireyi-Navvab" by Mir Mohsun Navvab in 1892. M. M. Navvab wrote about the date of his birth, occupation and character:

Mr. Akhund Mirza Jalal Akhund Haji Mirza Alakbar oghlu from among the residents of the Karabakh region. He was born in 1277 and is now 33 years old. This is a young man of good will, kindness and good nature. Under the auspices of Haji Kerim Khan bin Zahir ad-Dawlat Ibrahim Khan Gajar, he studied science for ten years. From time to time, he wrote poetry in Turkish and Persian languages. He wrote poems in fragments, he does not have a single divan. The verses written below belong to this gentleman. He wrote them in his own handwriting in the month of Rabbi-ul-Awwal 1310.

In a review of the opera "Farhad and Shirin", published in the newspaper "Igbal" dated with 20 January 1914, M. E. Rasulzade called M. Yusifzade "an enlightened scientist and orientalist with extensive knowledge".

== Family ==
After the death of the first wife Leyla, Mirza Jalal Yusifzade married for the second time to Ziba khanum. From his first marriage, he had a son named Ali Yusif and two daughters: Sahba and Shahla. A son Alim Yusifzade was born from the second marriage.

His son Ali Yusif was among the students of the Republic of Azerbaijan sent to study abroad law in Paris in 1919. He was repressed in 1937.
