= Arablinski =

Arablinski (Azerbaijani: Ərəblinski) is an Azerbaijani surname. Notable people with the surname include:

- Balakishi Arablinski (1828–1902), Azerbaijani general
- Huseyn Arablinski (1881–1919), Azerbaijani actor
