= Tatar name =

A Tatar personal name, being strongly influenced by Russian tradition, consists of two main elements: isem (given name) and familia (family name) and also patronymic. Given names were traditional for Volga Tatars for centuries, while family names appeared in the end of the 19th century, when they replaced patronymics. In fact, the usage of family names appeared when Russian scribers gave documents to Tatars. Later, being adapted to Soviet tradition, Volga Tatars started to use a patronymic as the third element, especially in informal communication.

== Male names ==
- Marat (Марат) – Desired, most frequent male name
