= Azerbaijan Cultural Society =

Azerbaijani diaspora organization

- Azərbaycan Kültür Dərnəyi
- Founder: Mahammad Amin Rasulzade
- Official language: Azerbaijani language, Turkic languages
- Leader: Jamil Unal

Azerbaijan Cultural Society (Azerbaijani: Azərbaycan Kültür Dərnəyi), the first Azerbaijani diaspora organization in the world, was established in 1949 in Turkey. This organization was founded by Mahammad Amin Rasulzade, one of the founders of the Azerbaijan Democratic Republic. The first president of the society was Hamid Ataman.

== About ==
=== History ===
==== Establishment and purpose ====
The new phase of Azerbaijani political migration activity in Turkey began with the return of Mahammad Amin Rasulzade in 1947, who had left Turkey in 1931. During the years of his absence in Turkey (1931–1947), Resulzadeh worked as the head of the Azerbaijan National Center in various European countries after the end of World War II, before returning to Turkey. In this new period, the most active migration center became the Azerbaijan Cultural Society, established in 1924 under the initiative of Rasulzade, who led the Azerbaijan National Center.

The Azerbaijan Cultural Society, under the leadership of Rasulzade, along with the Azerbaijani National Independence Party, led the struggle for the independence and freedom of Azerbaijan in Turkey, and assumed the mission of being the main headquarters and carrier in Azerbaijan.

With the establishment of the Azerbaijan Cultural Society in Ankara, the focus of Azerbaijani political migration activity in Turkey shifted from Istanbul to Ankara. Subsequently, all the activities of the migration, especially the publication of the "Azerbaijan" journal, were carried out in Ankara.

On February 1, 1949, the statute of the society, founded by Memmed Altunbay, Hamid Ataman, and Aziz Alpaut, listed the following founding objectives:

Collecting, studying, and disseminating information about Azerbaijan, its history, and culture.

Publishing books, journals, and newspapers and organizing cultural events.

Providing financial and moral assistance to those in need.

Establishing branches for sports, theater, opera, folklore, music, women, media, and youth, and organizing folklore groups.

Organizing nature and tourist excursions.

Opening student dormitories.

The statute of the Union is constantly updated to meet the emerging needs of the historical process.

One of the important goals of the society was to introduce Azerbaijan to Turkey and ensure the support of Anatolian Turks for the just cause of Azerbaijan. According to the "Azerbaijan" journal, which is the publishing organ of the society, the main objective of the society was "to introduce Azerbaijani culture to Anatolian Turks and to further strengthen and consolidate the literary-cultural relations between these two branches of the great Turkic nation." The president of the society, Kerim Oder, used similar expressions in his speech in 1958, stating, "Nine years ago, with your help, we started this path by using the limited opportunities and means available to bring together two separated brothers emotionally and spiritually." Oder also added that maximum attention was paid to the unity and cohesion of various Turkic associations when organizing the society's events.

In the book published on the occasion of the 40th anniversary of the establishment of the society, the leadership of the society expressed that they had achieved the objectives mentioned above on a large scale.

The Azerbaijani Turks, together with the modern Ergenekon of world Turks, which consists of Anatolian Turks in terms of language, history, art, culture, and folklore, have demonstrated efforts of unity. Looking back at the 40-year period, we see how much progress we have made and how we have overcome political and geographical obstacles from the Aegean to the Caspian, embodying a cultural integrity... All of these are the results of the work of an art forge that has lasted for 40 years. The Azerbaijan Cultural Society experiences the joy of introducing and endearing Turks to Turks with every step, every aspect, and every situation.

The first headquarters of the society was the Waqf Office Building, which was constructed in the Ulus district of Ankara as one of the contemporary buildings of the period. The building was rented jointly with the Turkish Nationalists Association. For a long time, the Azerbaijan Cultural Society used the building on Saturdays, while the Turkish Nationalists Association used it on Sundays. In 1985, the headquarters of the society was moved to Sakarya Street in Kızılay, and in the autumn of 1990, it was relocated to a building in Kavaklıdere. In October 1992, the society purchased a building on Bayındır Street in Kızılay, which is now used as the central headquarters of the society.

Following the military coup on September 12, 1980, the activities of all organizations and associations, including the Azerbaijan Cultural Society, were temporarily suspended. The sealed headquarters of the society was reopened shortly thereafter, following protests from the officials, by the order of the respective military authorities.

Not long after, upon the demand of citizens living in other cities, the society opened new branches in other cities, primarily in Istanbul, in 1991. These branches began operating in the cities of Izmir, Bursa, Antalya, Sivas, Kayseri, Turqutlu, Soke, and others.

==== Activity of the association in the independence process of Azerbaijan ====
The process that began in the mid-1980s and led to the dissolution of the Soviet Union was closely monitored by the Azerbaijan Cultural Society. During this period, when the society supported Azerbaijan's independence demands, it also mobilized all resources in the face of pressures and massacres inflicted by Armenians to compel Azerbaijanis, coinciding with the independence process. The society reacted strongly to the migration of Turks, especially from Yerevan, and attempts to occupy Karabakh. In response, rallies were organized in various parts of the country to create public opinion and disseminate information within the society by establishing media centers. The events unfolding in Azerbaijan found their reflection both in the Azerbaijan Turkish Culture journal, the publishing organ of the society, and in meetings held at the society's headquarters. In response to these events, the Azerbaijan National Center organized a press conference on Karabakh and Nakhchivan, rejecting the unjust and baseless demands of the Armenians. In this process, the Azerbaijan Cultural Society, together with the Turkish Societies Association, organized the "Azerbaijan Events Symposium" in Ankara on March 26, 1988. From 1988 onwards, the society continued its relations with Azerbaijan in education, culture, social assistance, and other issues without cutting ties. During this period, the society primarily developed its relations and cooperation with many institutions and organizations such as the Azerbaijan People's Front, the Azerbaijan National Academy of Sciences, the Azerbaijan Writers' Union, the Azerbaijan Journalists' Union, and others. These relations soon translated into concrete steps. The first example of this was the "Literature of Azerbaijan in Migration Life" symposium organized jointly by the Azerbaijan Cultural Society and the Azerbaijan National Academy of Sciences from April 1 to 6, 1991 in Baku. On the occasion of this symposium, an official meeting was held in Baku for the first time with the leader of the Azerbaijan People's Front, Abulfaz Elchibey, and a cooperation protocol was signed. During this visit, meetings were also held with Azerbaijan's Prime Minister Hasan Hasanov. As a concrete expression of these relations, a symposium dedicated to the 850th anniversary of the birth of Azerbaijani poet Nizami Ganjavi was held in Ankara from May 3 to 9, 1991, through the collaboration of the Azerbaijan Cultural Society and the Azerbaijan National Academy of Sciences. In 1989, the society also hosted children who came from Azerbaijan to participate in the April 23 National Sovereignty and Children's Day. Additionally, in 1989, famous Azerbaijani poet Bakhtiyar Vahabzade, the president of the Vatan Society, Elchin Efendiev, the director of the Azerbaijan Medical Institute, Prof. Nureddin Rzayev, renowned Azerbaijani historians Abbas Zamanov and Ziya Bunyadov, and the religious leader of the Caucasus Muslims, A. Pashazade, visited the society. In June 1991, during an official visit to Turkey, Azerbaijani President Ayaz Mutalibov also visited the society's headquarters. During this period of rapidly evolving events in Azerbaijan, the society demonstrated multifaceted and active engagement. For instance, in 1991, amidst the ongoing events in Karabakh, the society organized a donation campaign for Azerbaijan Turks injured on the front lines. That same year, as a result of a contract with the Azerbaijan People's Front, the society brought 50 students selected through exams from Baku to universities in Ankara, Istanbul, Izmir, Bursa, and provided them with conditions for higher education. The Ministry of Education later adopted this model, pioneered by the Azerbaijan Cultural Society, and implemented this experience in a manner that would encompass the entire Turkic world. Following the victory of the Azerbaijan People's Front in the general elections held on June 7, 1992, relations between the Azerbaijan Cultural Society and the Azerbaijani government further developed. After Abulfaz Elchibey was elected President of Azerbaijan, he made his first official visit to Turkey in June 1992. During this visit, Elchibey visited the Azerbaijan Cultural Society, wrote his thoughts and feelings in the society's honorary book, and also visited the grave of Mahammad Amin Rasulzade, the leader of the Azerbaijani political migration, and the honorary president of the Azerbaijan Cultural Society.

== Chairmen ==
Shortly after its establishment, during the first general assembly, Həmid Ataman was elected president, Aziz Alpaut was elected vice president, Feyzi Aghuzum was appointed as secretary, Enver Roman as treasurer, and Mammad Altunbay was selected as a member. During this assembly, one of the members, İbrahim Badalin, proposed the appointment of Mahammad Amin Rasulzade as the honorary president of the society, which was warmly welcomed with enthusiastic applause from the participants. Accepting the title of honorary president, Rasulzade held it until the end of his life. By the decision of the executive board of the society dated May 4, 1949, distinguished figures of the time such as Mustafa Vekilli, Esat Ortay, Hemdullah Subhi Tanrıover, Shemseddin Gunaltay, Fuad Koprulu, Sadıq Aran, M. Y. Mehdi, Shukru Saracoghlu, and Besim Atalay were selected as honorary members of the society.

Since its inception, the presidency of the Azerbaijan Cultural Society has been held by the following individuals:

== Activities of the association ==
Since its inception, the Azerbaijan Cultural Society has been organizing various events and activities in line with its purpose and mission, including celebrations, commemorations, conferences, panels, symposiums, publication of journals, bulletins, brochures, arranging tea parties, festivals, and balls, as well as forming folklore collectives and providing scholarships to needy citizens and university students. In the early days, the society primarily organized limited commemorative events such as the Novruz holiday, the anniversary of the establishment of the Azerbaijan Democratic Republic on May 28, 1918 (Independence and Freedom Day), and the anniversary of the occupation of Azerbaijan by Bolsheviks on April 27, 1920. However, the number and quality of events have constantly changed with the emergence of new events in historical processes. The society has continued its activities within the framework of women, youth, and culture branches.

Today, the activities organized by the society include:

- May 28: Anniversary of the establishment of the Azerbaijan Democratic Republic.
- January 31: Birthday of Mahammad Amin Rasulzade.
- March 6: Anniversary of the death of Mahammad Amin Rasulzade.
- March 31: March Genocide.
- April 27: Occupation of the Azerbaijan Democratic Republic by Bolsheviks.
- September 15: Entry of the Turkish army into Baku.
- December 12: Independence Day of Southern Azerbaijan Turks.
- January 20: Anniversary of the massacre carried out by Russians in Baku.
- February 26: Anniversary of the Khojaly genocide.
- January 12: Recognition Day of the Azerbaijan Democratic Republic.
- August 22: Anniversary of the death of Abulfaz Elchibey.
- March 21: Nowruz holiday.
- March 8: International Women's Day.
- December 31: International Solidarity Day of Azerbaijanis.

The association, from its inception, has not only been concerned with issues related to Azerbaijani Turks but also pays special attention to events concerning the Republic of Turkey and the Turkic world. Every year, visits to the Mausoleum, the organization of national and various holiday events, dedicating all issues of the "Azerbaijan" journal in 1981 to the 100th anniversary of Atatürk's birth, sending congratulatory letters to the Prime Minister and Chief of General Staff of the Republic of Turkey immediately after the 1974 Cyprus Peace Operation, sending a congratulatory message to the President of the Turkish Republic of Northern Cyprus, Rauf Denktaş, upon the declaration of the independence of Northern Cyprus, and publishing a statement in 1985 condemning the persecution and genocide against Turks in Bulgaria as "a new example of communist oppression" are just a few examples of the association's sensitivity to national issues. The Azerbaijan Balls, organized and made traditional by the association once a year, attracted great attention especially during the periods of intense public sensitivity related to the political processes in Azerbaijan, and achieved the mass participation of the political, bureaucratic and academic circles of Azerbaijan at that time. For example, at the Azerbaijan Ball held in 1987, the Minister of Foreign Affairs, Ministers of Agrarian and Agriculture; The party organized in 1986 was attended by Prime Minister Turgut Özal and his spouses, as well as many ministers.

=== Organization of conferences and symposia ===
The most significant conferences, symposiums, and publication activities in the association's activities are discussed and evaluated separately under the following headings:

Since the primary purpose of the establishment of the Azerbaijan Cultural Association was "to collect, process, and disseminate the history and culture of Azerbaijan," it has organized numerous conferences and seminars to introduce Azerbaijan in various aspects, more intensively and extensively. The significant number of conferences in the initial years of establishment is mainly due to the absence of a publishing organ within the association. Although the association planned a comprehensive series of conferences to introduce Azerbaijan with its various aspects in its founding year, it is known that some of these conferences could not be held for various reasons. Alongside the regular Saturday meetings where various issues of Azerbaijani Turks were discussed, the list of conferences held in the initial years of the association's establishment is provided below:

As seen from the list, conferences held in the early years of the association aimed to introduce the Azerbaijani language, literature, history, culture, customs, and traditions. In 1952, the monthly publication of the association, the "Azerbaijan" journal, led to a long period of stagnation in conference-type activities because similar topics were covered in the journal's articles. Towards the end of the 1980s, with Azerbaijan's progress towards independence, the association revived its conference and symposium activities. During this period, the Azerbaijan Cultural Association, together with the Turkish Societies, organized the Azerbaijan Events Symposium in Ankara on March 26, 1988. In this symposium, chaired by Feyzi Aghuzum, Prof. Dr. Abdulhaluk Chay presented a paper on "Massacres and terror perpetrated by Armenians in Azerbaijan between 1905-1920," Deputy Chairman Cemil Unal discussed "The sources of massacres and terrorism committed by Armenians, behind-the-scenes political games," and Secretary-General Ahmad Qaraca delivered a speech on "Armenian terror and massacre in our poetry." The Azerbaijan Cultural Association, in collaboration with the Azerbaijan National Academy of Sciences, also organized a symposium in Baku from April 1 to 6, 1991, on "Azerbaijani literature in the life of migrants." More than a hundred presentations were made by 38 participants from Turkey. The opening speech of the symposium was delivered by the leader of the Azerbaijan Popular Front, Abulfaz Elchibey. Within the framework of the symposium, an official meeting was held with the leader of the Azerbaijan Popular Front for the first time, and a cooperation protocol was signed. Additionally, a symposium dedicated to the 850th anniversary of the birth of Azerbaijani poet Nizami Ganjavi was organized in Ankara from May 3 to 9, 1991, through the joint efforts of the Azerbaijan Cultural Association and the Azerbaijan National Academy of Sciences.

=== Broadcast activity ===
Media activity plays a crucial role in the activities of the Azerbaijan Cultural Association. Especially in the early years when there were limited media resources, dissemination and promotional activities were only possible through the press. For this purpose, the association published a number of publications, books, and brochures. In the early years of its establishment, the Azerbaijan Cultural Association paid attention to the publication of many works that reflected Azerbaijan's struggle for independence as well as various aspects of our country. However, the deaths of M.E. Rasulzade on March 6, 1955, and Mirze Bala on March 8, 1959, caused a shake-up within the association, leading to stagnation in its publishing activities as in all aspects of its activities. It can be said that the Cyprus Issue in foreign policy and the March 27 Military Coup in domestic policy also had a significant impact on the slowdown of the association's activities. On February 24, 1973, the Azerbaijan Cultural Association held its next general assembly. Feyzi Aghuzum was elected president at the board meeting and held this position until February 24, 1990. During Aghuzum's presidency, particularly from 1978 onwards, a revitalization of the association's activities was observed. During this period, the increasing interest of Turkey's general political understanding in the issues of the Turkic world also influenced the association's publishing policy. Initially focused mainly on Azerbaijan in terms of subject matter, the publishing activity began to encompass general Turkic history, Turkic issues, and topics related to the Turkic world. The books published by the association since its inception are listed below:

==== Author and Publication ====
- M.A. Rasulzadeh, Cultural Traditions of Azerbaijan, Ankara 1949.
- M.A. Rasulzade, Contemporary Azerbaijani Literature, Ankara 1950.
- A. Vahab Yurtsever, Mirza Fatali Akhundzade's life and work, Ankara, 1950.
- M.A. Rasulzade, History of Contemporary Azerbaijan, Ankara, 1951.
- A. Vahab Yurtsever, Azerbaijan Drama Literature, Ankara, 1951
- A. Vahab Yurtsever, Sabir's place in Azerbaijani literature, Ankara, 1951.
- Mirza Bala, Turkish Albania in the History of Azerbaijan, Ankara, 1951.
- Karim Oder, Economy of Azerbaijan, Ankara, 1952.
- A. Vahab Yurtsever, The works of Vidadi and Vagif in Azerbaijani literature, Ankara, 1952
- Selected Poems of Almas İldırım, Ankara, 1953.
- Prof. Dr. Ahmet Jafaroglu, Stages of Azerbaijani Language and Literature, Ankara, 1953.
- Prof.Dr. I. Gayabaly- C. Aslanaoglu, Main Lines of the Cultural History of Azerbaijani Turks, Ankara 1978.
- A.D. Rasulzade, Milli Tasanud, Ankara, 1978.
- Prof. I. Kayabali- C. Arslanaoglu, 93 War with its beginnings and results, Ankara 1978,
- Prof. I. Kayabali- Jamandar Arslanaoglu, Turkish National Culture, Ankara, 1981.
- Ahmet Karaca, A Brief View of the Recent History of Azerbaijan, Ankara, 1982.
- Dr. A. Baycan, From the Song of the Heart, Ankara 1983.
- M. A. Rasulzade, Azerbaijani Cultural Traditions and Contemporary Azerbaijani Literature, Ankara 1984
- Prof. Ismail Gayabali- C. Arslanaoglu, Bulgarian Turks, Ankara, 1985.
- C. Arslanoglu, Kars National Islamic Council and the South Western Caucasus National Council, Ankara, 1986.
- Şükrü K. Safaroğlu- Adnan Müdarrisoğlu, History of Turkish States, Ankara 1986.
- C. Arslanoğlu, Conversion of Turks to Islam and Turkish-Islamic Civilization in Eastern Anatolia, Ankara 1986.
- Monumental Personalities in the History of Azerbaijani Turkish Literature, Ankara, 1987.
- Prof. Orkhan Türkdoğan, Social Structure of Eastern Anatolia, Ankara 1987.
- Isaq Sungurluoğlu, Harput Road (selections), Ankara 1987.
- Monumental Personalities in the History of Azerbaijani Turkish Literature II, Ankara 1987.
- Assoc. Dr. Enver Konukcu, Bingöl to Koroglu, Ankara, 1987.
- Cemil Unal, The Place of Azerbaijan in the Turkish and Islamic World, Ankara 1987.
- Dr. A. Baycan, Mountain Flowers, Ankara, 1987.
- Sadi Bayram, Traces of the Proto-Turks in Southeast Anatolia, Ankara 1988.
- Monumental Personalities in the History of Azerbaijani Turkish Literature III, Ankara 1987.
- Kingdom and Caliphate (Should it be abolished?), Ankara 1988. Dr. Akram Ruhi Fığlalı, Atatürk and Religion, Ankara, 1988.
- Prof. Dr. Abdurrahman Gozal- Sh. Gaya Safaroglu, Atatürk and National Unity, Ankara, 1988.
- Yilmaz Oztuna, XX. Eastern Problem in the Last Quarter of the Century, Ankara, 1989.
- Problems of Turkey in our press, Ankara, 1989.
- Nagorno-Karabakh: Dreams and Realities, Ankara, 1989.
- Prof. Dr. Mehmet Saray, Clothing and Secularism, Ankara, 1989.
- Malahat Altunbay, Turk Flying to Freedom, Memoirs of Mehmet Altunbay,
- Yılmaz Öztuna, Die Ostfragen Im Letzten Vietrel Des XX. Jahrhunderts, Ankara, 1989.
- Yilmaz Oztuna, Question D'orinet Durant Le Dernier Quart du XX. Siecle, Ankara, 1989.
- Ahmet Gabaklı, Near Southeast, Ankara, 1990.
- Mirza Bala Mammadzade, National Azerbaijan Movement, Ankara, 1991.
- Ahmet Gabaklı, Born from the East, Ankara, 1993.
- Almas İldırım, Appeal to the Brave, Ankara, 1995.
- M.A. Rasulzadeh, Azerbaijan Problem, Ankara 1996.
- Genocide (1895–1922) Ankara, 1996.
- Prof. Jamil Hasanli, History of Azerbaijan (1918–1920) Ankara, 1998.
- Dr. Sabahaddin Shimshir, Political and Cultural Activities of Azerbaijanis in Turkey, Ankara, 2000.
- Alasgar Alasgarli-Elshad Mahmudov, Azerbaijan Misak-i Millisi, Ankara, 2002.
- Rizvan Qanbarli, Journalism in Azerbaijan, Ankara, 2003.
- Ali Erol, the epic of freedom
- Ali Erol, Romance in Azerbaijani Poetry, Izmir, 2007.

As seen from the list of publications above, initially, the association's published books aimed primarily to introduce various aspects of Azerbaijan. However, towards the late 1970s, coinciding with the strengthening of right-wing politics in Turkey and the rise in value of concepts such as Turkism, Turkish history, and the Turkic World, the topics of publications became more diverse. After 1991, publications related to Azerbaijan began to regain prominence.

==== Azerbaijan magazine ====
After the Second World War, Rasulzade foresaw the growing importance of culture in the changing world conditions. In 1949, he founded the Azerbaijan Cultural Society to lead the struggle for Azerbaijan's independence and freedom in the cultural sphere. Soon after, the need arose for a media organ to advocate this idea. During the fourth extraordinary congress of the society, this issue was raised, and matters such as the type, frequency, and name of the publication were discussed. As a result of these discussions, the proposal to publish a monthly journal, with the belief that it would be more sustainable, was generally accepted. It was also suggested during the meeting, by Feyzi Aghuzum, who would serve as the president of the society for many years to come, that the journal should be named "Azerbaijan ". In the first issue of the journal, the introductory article titled "Beginning", signed by the Board of Directors of the Azerbaijan Cultural Society, explained the main purpose of the journal with the following words:

In accordance with the desires of the members of the fourth congress of the Azerbaijan Cultural Society, we have expanded our publication program with the modest and humble release of this small journal. Until now, our society, which has only published scientific, literary, and historical conferences, felt the need to publish a journal this time to further strengthen its cultural ties with its members in Ankara and the provinces. Through this journal, which will be published monthly for now, detailed information will be provided about the work carried out by our society for more than three years, and we will strive to provide citizens with as much comprehensive information as possible about the history, literature, and art of the Azerbaijani Turkic people, who are so close to the Anatolian Turks.

The "Azerbaijan" journal formed the new phase of publications of the Azerbaijan political emigration in Turkey from 1923 to 1931. By the decision of the board of directors of the society, the "Azerbaijan " journal began to be published under the name "Azerbaijan Monthly Turkish Culture" journal starting from the January issue of 1966. With the same decision, Vahab Yurtsever was appointed as the chief editor of the journal, Kerim Alhan (Yaycılı) as the responsible person for general publication, and Ahmad Yashat as the responsible director, in addition to specifying the duties of the chief editor, responsible person for general publication, and responsible director in detail.

Although a decision was made to publish the journal every three months from 1966, due to financial difficulties, the publication of the journal had to be suspended for a period of six months starting from July 1968.

Articles published in the journal from 1993 onwards were converted into bibliographic index and published on the official website of the society.

The "Azerbaijan" journal has been continuing its regular publication life for nearly 65 years. It is an important source of information for tracking events related to the Azerbaijani and Turkic world from the early 1950s to the present day. The journal also serves as a unique archive for those interested in tracking the history, politics, and activities of the society.
