= Tax Code of Azerbaijan =

The Tax Code of Azerbaijan (Azerbaijani: Azərbaycan Respublikasının Vergi Məcəlləsi) is the primary tax law in Azerbaijan. The Code establishes general principles of taxation in Azerbaijan, sets the rules for determining payment and collection of taxes, and identifies the rights and responsibilities of taxpayers and tax authorities, as well as the liabilities for violation of tax legislation.

The Code was adopted by Milli Majlis at the initiative of the former President of Azerbaijan Heydar Aliyev on July 11, 2000, and entered into force in January 2001.

== Structure ==
The Tax Code of Azerbaijan consists of 17 chapters and 221 articles. The chapters are as follows:

General part	Chapter 1.	General Provisions
General part	Chapter 2.	Taxpayer. Tax Agent
General part	Chapter 3.	State Tax Authorities (Agencies)
General part	Chapter 4.	Tax control
General part	Chapter 5.	Responsibility for violation of tax legislation
General part	Chapter 6.	Appealing against the decisions (acts) of tax authorities and actions or lack of action of their officials
General part	Chapter 7.	General provisions on tax payments
Special part	Chapter 8.	Income tax from natural persons
Special part	Chapter 9.	Profit tax from legal persons
Special part	Chapter 10.	Articles concerning income taxes of natural and profit taxes of legal persons
Special part	Chapter 11.	Value Added Tax
Special part	Chapter 12.	Excise taxes
Special part	Chapter 13.	Property Tax
Special part	Chapter 14.	Tax on land
Special part	Chapter 15.	Road tax
Special part	Chapter 16.	Mining tax
Special part	Chapter 17.	Simplified tax

General provisions regarding tax relations, rights and responsibilities of taxpayers and tax agents, as well as tax agencies, tax control processes are defined; moreover, responsibilities for violation of tax legislation and the process of appealing of decisions of tax authorities are identified, finally general rules for tax payments are mentioned in the General part of the Code.

The special part of the code separately defines specific taxes like income tax, profit tax, VAT, tax on land, road tax, mining tax, and simplified tax, as well as the procedures related to these taxes are detailed in this part.

== Classification of taxes ==
Tax is defined as “a compulsory, individual, and non-refundable payment made to the state or local budget in the form of collection of monetary means from taxpayers with the purpose of providing the financial basis to the state and municipal activities” in the Tax Code of Azerbaijan (Article 11).

The Code classifies the taxes in Azerbaijan into state, autonomy republic, and municipal taxes based on the territory they cover. State taxes are obligatory in the whole territory of Azerbaijan and includes income tax of natural person, profit tax of legal entities, VAT, excise tax, property tax, land use tax, road fund tax, mining tax, and simplified tax.

== Parties of tax relations ==
- Parties of relations regulated by tax legislation are following:
- Individuals and legal entities recognized by this Code as taxpayers
- Individuals and legal entities recognized by this Code as tax agents
- State tax authorities of the Republic of Azerbaijan
- Customs authorities of the Republic of Azerbaijan
- Financial bodies of the Republic of Azerbaijan (related to solving the issues envisaged by this code)
- Others than tax and customs officers conducting the collection and transfer of funds from taxpayers to the budget according to this Code

== Taxpayers' rights and responsibilities ==
Taxpayers have the right to get comprehensive written information about taxes and tax regulations; take advantage of tax privileges in the cases regulated by this code; demand timely return or redemption of overpaid or overcharged taxes; receive copies of documents prepared as the result of tax inspection; follow no decisions and requirements of tax officials that do not comply with the code; require not to reveal confidential information; demand full payment of damages resulting from illegal acts or actions (inaction) of tax authorities; and appeal to the court on the actions or inaction of tax officials in accordance with the code.

Taxpayers are responsible for paying taxes and other obligatory fees determined in the code; getting TIN (taxpayer's identification number) from tax authorities; keeping records of revenues and expenses, as well as taxation objects; submitting tax report and required documents to the authorities.

== Tax audits ==
Tax inspections under the Azerbaijani Tax Code are operative-tax measures, on-site tax audits, and off-site tax audits.

== Amendments ==
The Tax Code of Azerbaijan has been amended several times; the last amendments were made in December 2018, which aimed to reduce the scale of tax evasion and the shadow economy, expand the taxable base, improve tax administration, support the development of entrepreneurship, and increase the economic efficiency of existing and new tax exemptions.

According to the amendments, employees of non-oil sectors with a monthly salary up to 8,000 manat get 100% tax exemption, while the tax rate for the employees with a monthly salary more than 8,000 manat has reduced from 25% to 14%. Moreover, the simplified tax is set to be 2% throughout the country, which was previously 4% in Baku and 2% in the regions.

Micro-enterprises and small businesses got exemption from property tax, furthermore, startups in the small and medium businesses segment will not pay profit or income tax for a three-year period after getting the certificate for startup activity. Small and medium businesses will be free from profit tax, land tax, and value-added tax for a period of seven years.

Effective 1 January 2026, personal income tax for the salary income was reinstated with the following rates:

Up to 2500 manats	3 percent
From 2500 manats to 8000 manats	75 manats + 10 percent of the amount from 2500 manats to 8000 manats
Over 8000 manats	625 manats + 14 percent

Moreover, Azerbaijan has introduced a horizontal monitoring tax supervision method.

== See also ==
- Ministry of Taxes of Azerbaijan
