= Hajinski =

Hajinski is a surname. Notable people with the surname include:

- Isa bey Hajinski, Azerbaijani oil magnate
- Isgandar bey Hajinski, Azerbaijani historian
- Jamo bey Hajinski, Azerbaijani publicist, theater critic, State Controller and Minister of Transportation, Postal Service and Telegraph of Azerbaijan Democratic Republic
- Mammad Hasan Hajinski, Azerbaijani statesman and architect
- Mehdi bey Hajinski, Azerbaijani actor and State Controller within the third cabinet of Azerbaijan Democratic Republic
