= State Tax Service under the Ministry of the Economy (Azerbaijan) =

The State Tax Service under the Ministry of Economy of the Republic of Azerbaijan
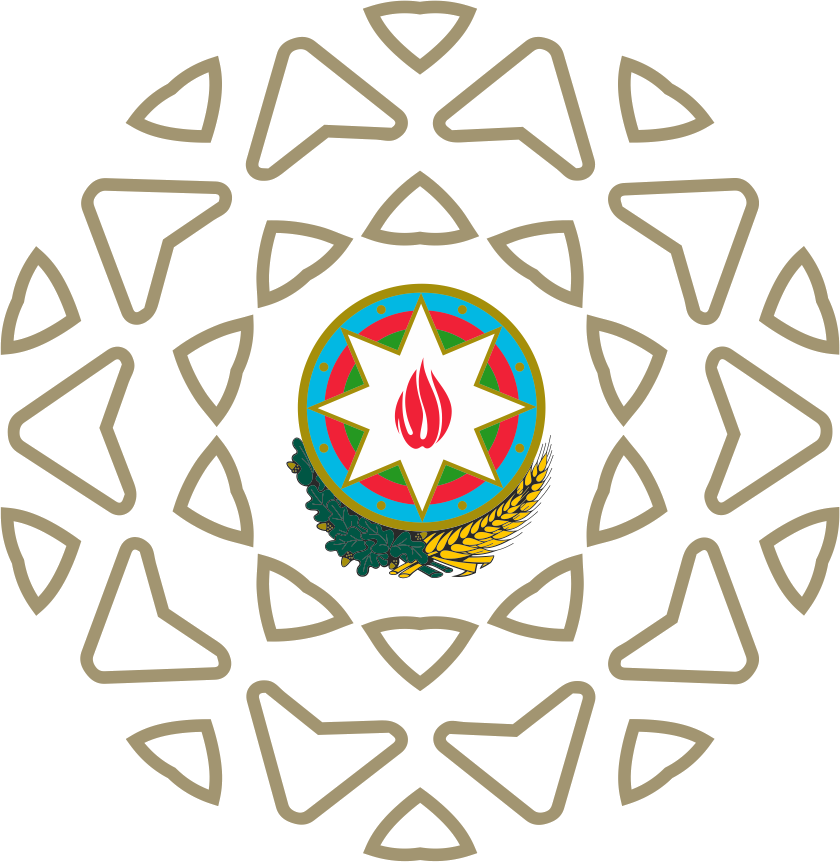

Agency overview
- Formed: October 23, 2019
- Preceding agency: The Ministry of the Taxes of Azerbaijan Republic
- Headquarters: Baku, Azerbaijan
- Agency executive: Orkhan Nazarli, Head
- Website: https://www.taxes.gov.az/az

The State Tax Service under the Ministry of Economy of the Republic of Azerbaijan is a state body that ensures state control over the timely and full collection of taxes, compulsory state social insurance, unemployment insurance, and compulsory medical insurance, as well as other compulsory payments within the framework of a single financial and budgetary policy, which are assigned by law and an act of the President of the Republic of Azerbaijan to the competence of the Service.

== History ==
=== Ministry of Taxes ===
State Tax Service under the Ministry of Economy of Azerbaijan
- Azərbaycan Respublikası Vergilər Nazirliyi
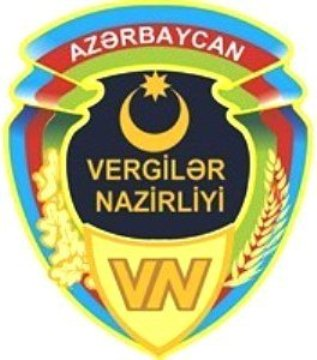

Agency overview
- Formed: February 11, 2000
- Dissolved: October 23, 2019
- Headquarters: 16 Landau Street, Baku, Azerbaijan Republic AZ1073
- Agency executives: Minister of Taxes; Sahir Mammadkhanov, First Deputy Minister; Matin Eynullayev, Deputy Minister; Ilkin Valiyev, Deputy Minister
- Website: www.taxes.gov.az

The Ministry of the Taxes of Azerbaijan Republic (Azerbaijani: Azərbaycan Respublikası Vergilər Nazirliyi) was the Azerbaijani executive agency that ensured the implementation of state tax policy until 2019, when it was replaced by the State Tax Service. Before it was replaced, its role included the timely and full collection of taxes and other revenues to the state budget, and exercised state control within the framework of a single financial and budgetary policy implemented in the Republic of Azerbaijan. On October 23, 2019, the Ministry of Taxes was dissolved, and the State Tax Service was established under the Ministry of Economy (Azerbaijan).

First Tax Inspection under the Ministry of Finance of Azerbaijan Democratic Republic was established by the decision of the Parliament dated 17 June 1919. Since that time, the tax service has begun its activity.

From 1920 to 1991, tax matters in Azerbaijan were made part of the tax system of the Soviet Union.

After restoration of the independence in July 1990, a tax service was set up within the Ministry of Finance of the Republic of Azerbaijan to ensure timely and full collection of taxes and other mandatory payments in the Republic of Azerbaijan, as well as to ensure the state control over legal and physical persons' compliance with tax legislation and state pricing discipline.

In October 1991, the Tax Service was separated from the Ministry of Finance for the purpose of improving supervision over compliance to tax legislation, strengthening the role of the state tax service in this area, and ensuring the objectivity of its independent activities and supervision. As a result, the independent body, the State Tax Inspectorate of the Republic of Azerbaijan, was established.

By the Decree of the President of the Republic of Azerbaijan dated 11 February 2000, the General State Tax Inspectorate was revoked, and the Ministry of the Taxes was established to ensure proper state tax policy, timely and full collection of taxes and other mandatory payments, as well as state control over that area.

==== Training Centre ====
The Training Centre of the Ministry of Taxes was established by Decision No. 90 of the Cabinet of Ministers of the Republic of Azerbaijan as of June 5, 2002 on the basis of Decree No. 539 on the application of the law of the Republic of Azerbaijan, on approval of the Regulation “On service in state tax authorities” signed by the president of the Republic of Azerbaijan, Heydar Aliyev.

A new complex of the Training Center was inaugurated in the village of Nagarakhana of Shamakhi on September 13, 2011, with the participation of the President Ilham Aliyev. The aim of the center is to carry out educational processes to improve the level of knowledge and vocational training of the employees of tax authorities, ensure practical work and management ability, master new technologies and techniques, and adapt training methods to constantly changing working conditions.

==== Programs to improve tax administration ====
- State program on improvement of tax administration in the Republic of Azerbaijan (2005–2007)

=== Current State Tax Service ===
On October 23, 2019, the State Tax Service was established under the Ministry of Economy of Azerbaijan based on the Decree of the President of Azerbaijan on expanding the functions and structure of the Ministry of Economy.

On May 12, 2020, by the decree of the President Ilham Aliyev the regulations on the State Tax Service were approved.

On July 3, 2020, Ilham Aliyev signed a decree on the amendments to the Regulation on the State Tax Service under the Ministry of Economy of Azerbaijan.

On May 6, 2021 Orkhan Nazarli has been appointed to the post of head of the State Tax Service under the Ministry of Economy of Azerbaijan.

== Duties ==
In accordance with the directions of activity defined by the statute of the State Tax Service, the duties of the service are as follows:

- Participate in the preparation of projects of normative legal acts regulating relations in the field of tax relations, as well as in the field of calculation and payment of mandatory state social insurance, unemployment insurance, and compulsory health insurance premiums; give feedback and suggestions on them
- Participate in preparing of development programs in the relevant field
- Participate in the preparation of proposals on regulating relations in the field of taxation between the Republic of Azerbaijan and other countries
- Ensure supervision over the correct calculation, timely and full collection of tax collection, compulsory state social insurance, unemployment insurance, compulsory medical insurance, as well as other compulsory payments referred to the competence of the Service by law and act of the President of the Republic of Azerbaijan
- Keep a record of calculated and received on-purpose taxes and fees, compulsory social insurance, unemployment insurance, and compulsory medical insurance and to inform the Ministry with an aim to submitting a report to the President of Azerbaijan, Cabinet of Ministers of Azerbaijan and the Ministry of Finance of Azerbaijan
- Control the income from the lease of other lands in state ownership, except lands that are in use by legal entities, state-owned, or state owned land on which is projected the construction of public facilities, enterprises, and objects constructed by legal entities and individuals
- Implement state supervision in the field of accounting in cases stated by the Law of Azerbaijan "About accounting"
- Keep records of taxpayers, their branches, representative offices, or other divisions (objects), cash registers, as well as persons who use land suitable for agriculture that they own for the purposes of mandatory state social insurance
- Ensure the production of control stamps in accordance with the laws of Azerbaijan "About freedom of religion" and "About medicines"
- Draw up forms of reports, declarations, and other documents related to the calculation and payment of taxes, mandatory state social payments, unemployment insurance premiums, and mandatory medical insurance, as well as other mandatory payments referred by law and the act of the President of Azerbaijan to the competence of the Service
- Сonsider requests in connection with activities in accordance with the laws of Azerbaijan "On citizens appeals", “On administrative proceedings“ and "On access to information" and take measures in accordance with the procedures established by law
- Coordinate the work of institutions that are part of the service structure and subordinate institutions that are not part of its structure, and monitor their activities
- Perform other duties established by the tax code and acts of the President of Azerbaijan etc.

== Rights ==
In accordance with the statute of the State Tax Service, it has the following rights to perform its duties:

- Тo make proposals to the Ministry on the implementation of reforms in the relevant field
- Take an initiative before the Ministry in the field of international agreements of Azerbaijan İn the relevant areas
- By agreement with the ministry, to participate in international events and organize such events, as well as conferences, seminars, and training courses in the country or abroad
- Submit proposals to the Ministry for the creation, reorganization, and liquidation of subordinate institutions that are not part of its structure
- Submission of proposals to the Ministry in connection with the establishment of a periodical press, dealing with the issue of special bulletins and other publications in accordance with the procedure established by the Law of Azerbaijan ”About mass media"
- Use the rights defined by the tax code while implementing tax control measures
- Ensure the implementation of control in the field of prevention of deliberate destruction, falsification, illegal manufacture, use, and sale of control marks
- Carry out operational and investigative activities in cases and in accordance with the procedure established by the Law of Azerbaijan "On operational and investigative activities"
- Implement investigation procedures in accordance with the procedure established by the criminal procedure code of Azerbaijan
- Consider cases of administrative violations; impose administrative penalties in connection with violation of the requirements of legislation in the relevant area.

== Apparatus ==
- Main department of tax risk management
- Main department for Administrative Complaints
- Main department of tax audit
- Main department of Tax Policy
- Main department of Digital Tax Administration
- Main department of International Taxation and Tax Monitoring
- Main Department for Controlling Declarations and Cameral Tax Audits
- Main Department of Economic Analysis and Control of the Implementation of Forecasts
- Main Department of Law
- Main department of Internal Security
- Main department of Human Resources
- Main department for the provision of services to taxpayers
- Main Department of Finance
- Main Department of Document Management and Control of Executive Discipline (Secretariat)
- Main Department for Coordinating the Activities of Local Structures
- Main Department of Registration and Accounting of Taxpayers
- Main Department of Control over the Execution of Tax Obligations
- Main department of the Tax Ombudsman Service
- Media and Communications Department
- Department of financial monitoring
- Project Management Department
- Secret department
- Information Security Department
- Protocol department

Institutions included in the structure of the State Tax Service under the Ministry of Economy:

According to the decree signed by the Azerbaijani President Ilham Aliyev on 24 July 2019, the structure of the Ministry of Taxes had been approved as the following way:

- Main Department of National Income
- Main Department of Tax Crime Primary Investigation
- Main Department of Control of Import and Export Operations
- Main Department of Control over Circulation of Excisable Goods and Marking
- Main Department of Local Income of the City of Baku
- Main Department of Work with Small Businesses in Baku
- Call-Center (authorized as a main department)
- Local offices (main offices, departments, and divisions)

As of 2023:

- Main Department of Organization of Operational Tax Control and Accounting of the City of Baku
- Main Department of the Ministry of Taxes for National Revenues
- Main Department of the Ministry of Taxes for Baku City Local Revenues
- Main Department of the Ministry of Taxes for Control over Import-Export Operations
- Main Department of the Ministry of Taxes for Control over Turnover of Excise and Marked Goods
- Main Department of the Ministry of Taxes for Preliminary Investigation of Tax Crimes
- Main Department of Liability Management
- Territorial tax main departments and departments

Subordinate institution that is not part of the structure of the State Tax Service under the Ministry of Economy:

- Training Centre - The aim of the center is to carry out educational processes to improve the level of knowledge and vocational training of the employees of tax authorities, ensure practical work and management ability, master new technologies and techniques, and adapt to constantly changing working conditions.

== Information resources of the Ministry of Taxes ==
- “Vergilər” (Taxes) online newspaper - has been published since February 11, 2000. “Vergiler.az” online newspaper has been launched since January 1, 2019, replacing the printed version of “Vergilər” newspaper. The online newspaper “Vergiler.az” is an online news resource that focuses on articles, interviews, and news about innovations in taxation and also enlightens economic processes.
- "Taxes magazine of Azerbaijan" (Azerbaijani: Azərbaycanın vergi jurnalı) was founded by the Ministry of Taxes on July 1, 2003. 158 pages magazine is published quarterly with a circulation of 1,000 copies. The “Tax Magazine of Azerbaijan” is a regular publication of the Ministry of Taxes. The magazine mainly focuses on current issues, as well as general conceptual matters of taxation with the possibility of publishing articles related to other sectors of the economy.

== See also ==
- Tax Code of Azerbaijan
- Ministry of Economy (Azerbaijan)
- Cabinet of Azerbaijan
- Economy of Azerbaijan
- List of company registers
- Tahmasib Ajdarov
