= Azerbaijan–Hungary relations =

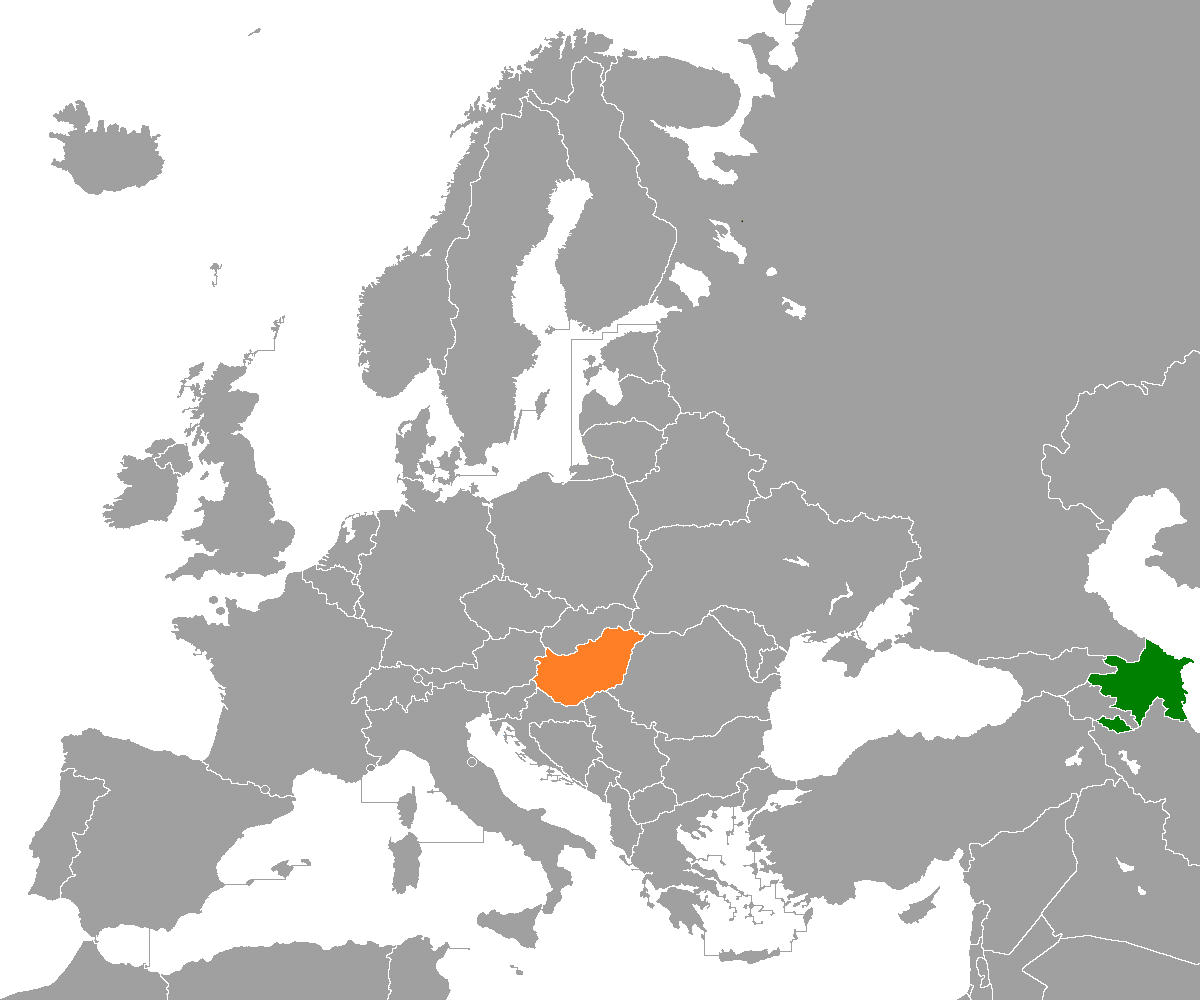

- Azerbaijan: Hungary

Diplomatic relations between Azerbaijan and Hungary were established in 1992, a year after the both states gained full independence from the Soviet Union. Azerbaijan has an embassy in Budapest. Hungary has an embassy in Baku.

Both countries are full members of the Council of Europe. Hungary has observer status in the Organization of Turkic States, in which Azerbaijan is a full member. Both countries are full members of the Turkic Investment Fund.

Hungary and Azerbaijan consider each other as key strategic partners. As of September 2025, Hungary was the third-largest investor in Azerbaijan. The two countries are connected by cultural and historical ties, and shared objectives.

In an October 2026 visit to Azerbaijan, the Ambassador of Hungary to Azerbaijan discussed the role of culture in strengthening bilateral relations. He highlighted the development of university partnerships between the two countries, especially in the agricultural and pharmaceutical fields. Additionally, he stated that “Hungary and Azerbaijan have strong foundations for cultural cooperation, rooted in our shared historical connections, cultural understanding, and sincere interest in and respect for one another”.

== Background ==
=== Diplomatic relations ===
The Republic of Hungary recognized the Republic of Azerbaijan on December 26, 1991 and the diplomatic relations were established on November 27, 1992. The Hungarian Embassy in Azerbaijan was established on January 12, 2009. Since December 14, 2010 ambassador of Hungary in Azerbaijan is Zsolt Cutora. The Embassy of Azerbaijan in Hungary was opened in September 2004. Currently, Ambassador of Azerbaijan to Hungary is Vilayat Guliyev.

Azerbaijan is a full member of the Organization of Turkic States while Hungary has observer status. Both countries are full members of the Turkic Investment Fund.

=== Azerbaijani minority in Hungary ===
There are estimated to be 26,000 Azerbaijanis in Hungary. As of October 2025, there are estimated to be over 1500 Azerbaijani students studying in Hungary.

== High-level mutual visits ==
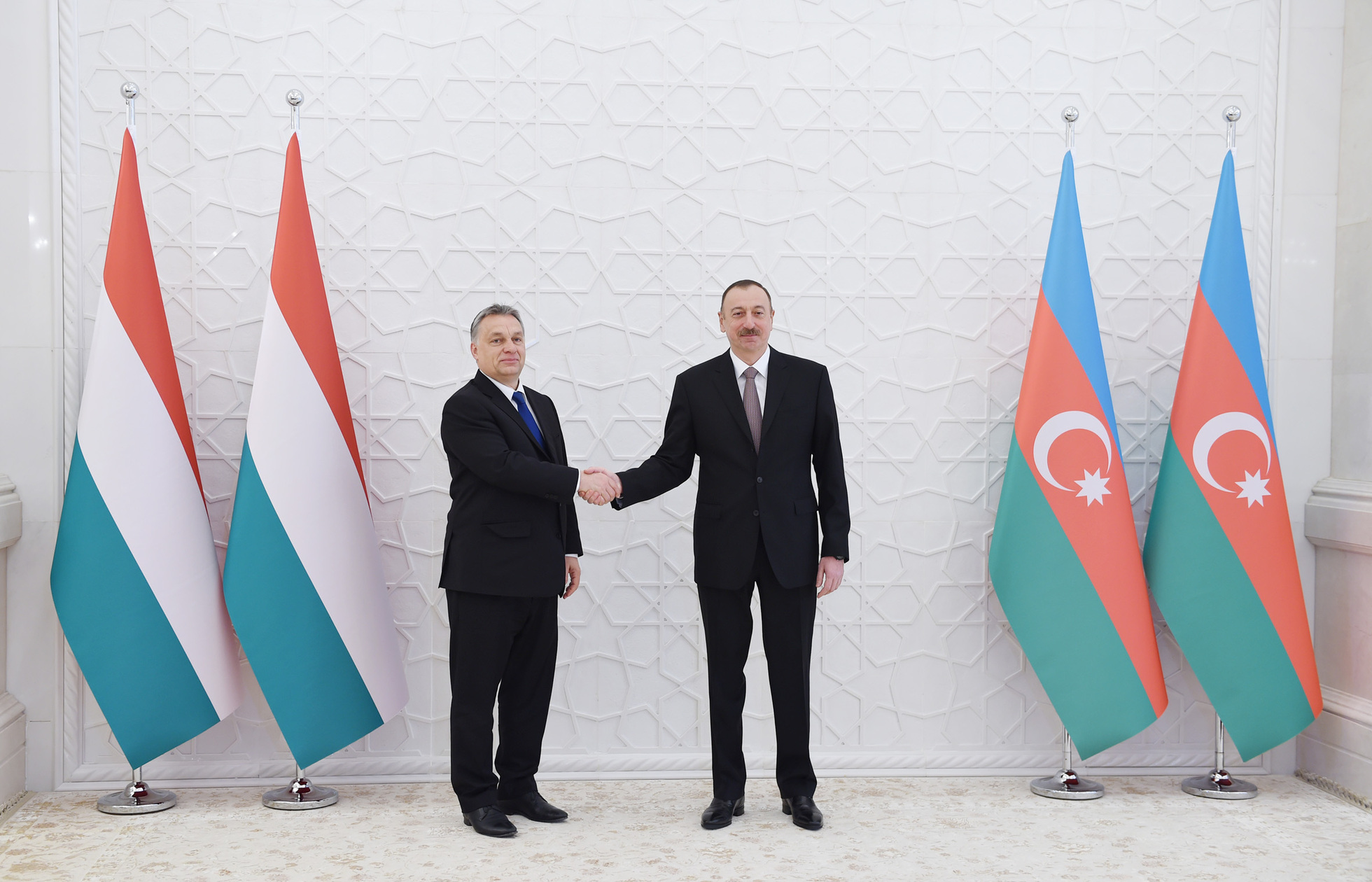
Hungarian Prime Minister Viktor Orbán meet with Azerbaijani President Ilham Aliyev with in Baku, 6 March 2016

=== Head of States ===
- 4–5 December 1994 - President of Azerbaijan Heydar Aliyev's working visit
- 18–19 February 2008 - President of Azerbaijan Ilham Aliyev's official visit
- 26–27 January 2009 - President of Azerbaijan Ilham Aliyev's working visit
- 10–12 November 2011 - President of Hungary Pál Schmitt's visit
- 11–12 November 2014 - Azerbaijani President Ilham Aliyev visits Hungary.

=== Head of Governments ===
- 7–8 July 2008 - Prime Minister of Hungary Ferenc Gyurcsány's official visit;
- 14 November 2008 - Prime Minister Ferenc Gyurcsány's working visit;
- 13–14 September 2010 - Prime Minister of Hungary Viktor Orbán's official visit;
- 29 June-1 July 2012 - Prime Minister of Hungary Viktor Orbán's official visit.

=== Head of Parliaments ===
- 15 June 2007 - Vice-speaker of Milli Majlis V.Alasgarov official visit
- 5–7 September 2008 - Speaker of Parliament of Hungary Katalin Szili official visit
- 7–9 December 2011 - Chairman of the Milli Majlis Ogtay Asadov's official visit
- 5–8 June 2012 - Head of inter-parliamentary friendship group of Hungary Márton Gyöngyösi's visit
- 29 May-1 June 2013 - Head of inter-parliamentary friendship group of Hungary Márton Gyöngyösi's visit
- 14–15 June 2013 - Head of working group on Azerbaijan-Hungary inter-parliamentary relations Khanhuseyn Kazimli's visit

=== Ministers ===
- February 1997 - Hungary MFA Secretary of State I.Sent-Ivan visit
- 7–8 September 1998 - Hungary MFA Secretary of State Q.Qabi visit
- 03-24 April 2004 - Deputy State Secretary of Hungary Y.Boros visit
- 22–24 January 2006 - Hungary MFA Secretary of State on political issues A.Borso visit
- 29 November-1 December 2006 - Deputy Minister of Foreign Affairs X.Xalafov visit
- 22–23 March 2007 - Minister for Finance of Azerbaijan Mr. S.Sharifov visit
- 17–19 May 2007 - Minister of Foreign Affairs of Hungary Mrs. K.Qonts official visit
- 13–15 September 2007 - Minister of Industry and Energy of Azerbaijan N.Aliyev visit
- 23–25 September 2007 - Minister of Labor and Social Protection of Population of Azerbaijan F.Alakbarov official visit
- 22 November 2007 - Minister of Economy and Transport of Hungary Y. Koka visit
- 24–27 May 2009 - Head of the Border Service of Azerbaijan E.Guliyev visit
- 2 March 2010 - Deputy Minister of Foreign Affairs M.Mammad-Guliyev visit
- 11–12 March 2010 - Minister of Education of Azerbaijan M.Mardanov visit
- 24–26 February 2011 - State Minister for Foreign Affairs of Hungary J.Nemet visit
- 28 February-2 March 2011 - Deputy Minister of Foreign Affairs X.Xalafov visit
- 27–30 November 2011 - Chairman of the State Social Protection Fund of Azerbaijan Republic S.Muslimov visit
- 23–25 July 2012 - Head of inter-governmental commission group between Azerbaijan and Hungary, State Secretary Péter Szijjártó visit
- 8–9 October 2012 - Minister of Economic Development Shahin Mustafaev working visit
- 12–14 March 2013 - State Secretary of the Ministry of Rural Development Gyula Budai visit
- 7–8 April 2013 - Minister of National Development Zsuzsa Nemeth, State Secretary of National Development V.Nagy Vilmos, General Director of National Aviation Ildiko Sakmari, Senior Advisor of the Ministry of National Development Istvan Erenyi visit (for participating at the World Economic Forum)
- 17 May 2013 - Minister of Health of the Republic of Azerbaijan O.Shiraliyev visit
- 8–9 November 2013 - Minister of Communication and Information Technologies A.Abbasov visit
- 1–3 December 2013 - Minister of National Development Zsuzsa Nemeth visit
- 27–28 January 2014 - Head of inter-governmental commission group between Azerbaijan Hungary, State Secretary Peter Sijjarto visit
- 27–28 April 2014 - Minister of Foreign Affairs E.Mammadyarov working visit
- 3–4 November 2014 - Hungarian Minister of Foreign Affair and Trade Péter Szijjártó visited Azerbaijan.

== Inter-parliamentary relations ==
- On March 26, 2007 the Hungarian Parliament established the Hungary-Azerbaijan interparliamentary friendship group. Márton Gyöngyösi is the chairman of the group.
- The working group on Azerbaijan-Hungary inter-parliamentary relations was established in the Milli Majlis of Azerbaijan on 8 April 2011. The head of the working group is Khanhuseyn Kazimli.

== Strategic Partnership ==
Hungary signed strategic partnership agreement with Azerbaijan on November 11, 2014. Besides the main agreement, an aviation document cooperating on restarting direct flights between Budapest and Baku, a scholarship agreement for 200 Azerbaijani students, and further agreements on sports, youth and tourism were all signed today.

== Sister cities ==
- Gyöngyös, Hungary - Shusha, Azerbaijan
- Tiszavasvári, Hungary - Aghdam, Azerbaijan

== Youth level ==
Azerbaijani Hungarian Youth Union (AHYU) was established on December 6, 2012, by active representatives of Hungarian youth and Azerbaijani youth working and studying in Hungary. The main goal serves for improving Azerbaijani-Hungarian relations on youth level by creating and promoting youth to youth communication.

=== Projects ===
- Study in Hungary - which aims to inform Azerbaijani youth about education opportunities in Hungary.
- “Azerbaijan Tourism Days in Hungary” in November 21–22, 2014

== Education ==
Azerbaijan is considered one of the most promising markets for Hungarian universities seeking to attract foreign students, and leading universities of the country are ready to provide Azerbaijani students with quality education in such majors as international relations, management, ICT, medicine, agriculture, engineering, and water supply. Opportunity for the study of Azerbaijani students in Hungary were created by an agreement on a scholarship program for students, which was signed in 2012 in Budapest on the sidelines of a meeting of the intergovernmental commission on economic cooperation. Starting from 2015 Hungary will admit 200 Azerbaijani students under this program and the Hungarian side will pay for education, provide a dormitory and grant students a monthly scholarship worth about 40,460 Hungarian forints (~125 euro).

== Energy ==
Hungary will need to find new sources to ensure the security of its energy supplies for the long term, Foreign Minister Péter Szijjártó told in reaction to Russia's dropping plans for the South Stream gas pipeline project. Concerning the actual options, Szijjarto mentioned gas imported from Azerbaijan.

== Business ==
Azerbaijani-Hungarian Business forum was organized in Budapest in November, 2014.

=== Transportation ===
- Direct WizzAir flight between Baku and Budapest was announced in April 2013, flights started in June, 2013.
- Baku-Budapest cargo connection begins in March, 2014

=== Food ===
- Sericovia Kft started importing organic pomegranate juices from Azerbaijan to Hungary starting from 2012.

== Art ==
- Hungarian stamps reflecting Azerbaijani art symbols were issued;
- Budapest postage stamps reflect Azerbaijani artist's (Chingiz Mehbaliyev's) paintings.

== Charity ==
Azerbaijan to support Hungarian institute for blind children. The foundation stone of a new wing of the Laszlo Batthyany Institute for Blind Children, to be constructed in part from Azerbaijani funds, was laid in Budapest in January, 2014. The project will cost 500 million forints (EUR 1.67m), of which 240 million will be covered by the Azerbaijani foundation.

== Resident diplomatic missions ==
- Azerbaijan has an embassy in Budapest.
- Hungary has an embassy in Baku.
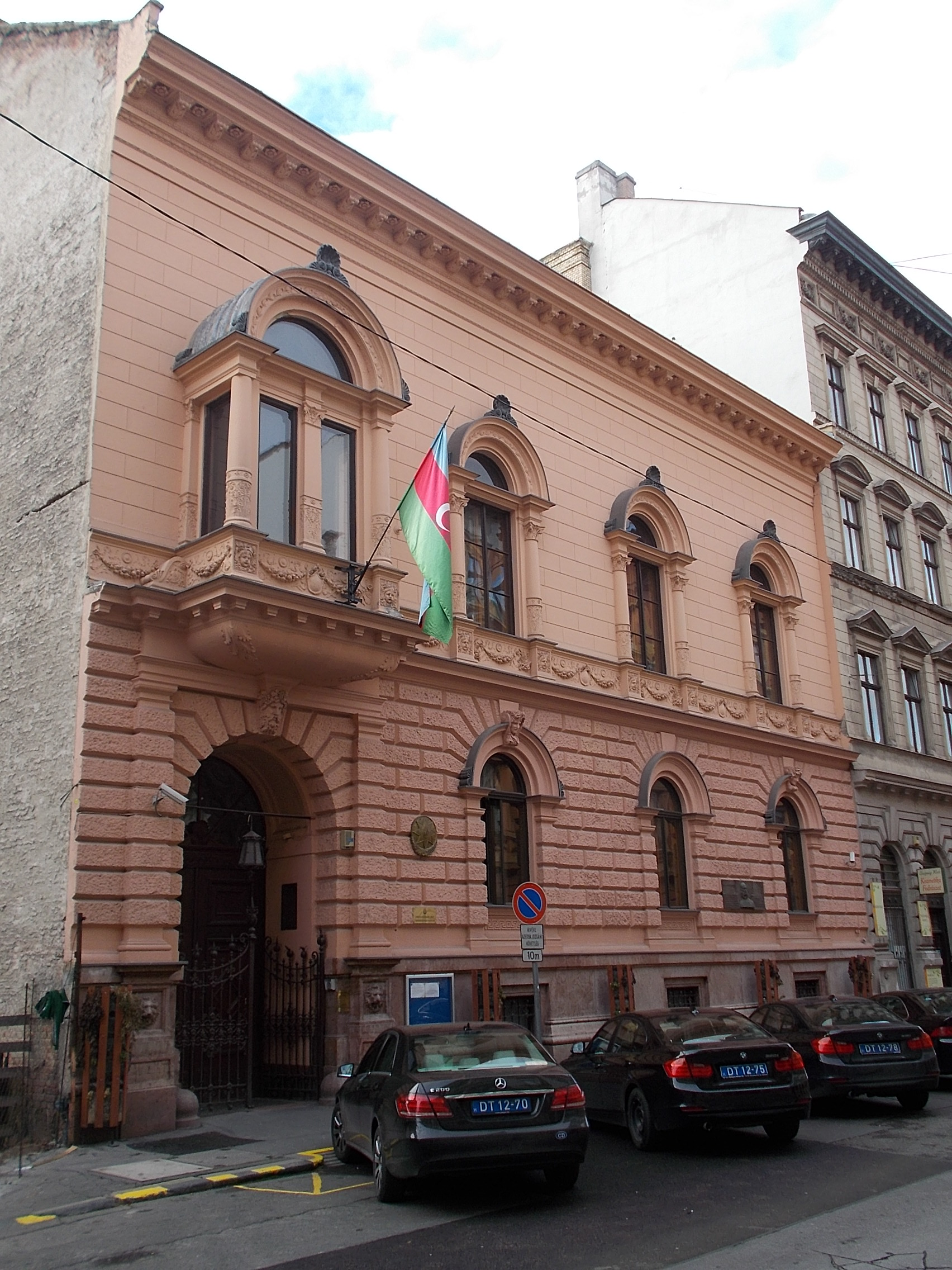
Embassy of Azerbaijan in Budapest

== See also ==
- Foreign relations of Azerbaijan
- Foreign relations of Hungary
- Azerbaijan-NATO relations
- Azerbaijan-EU relations
