= Azerbaijan–Romania relations =

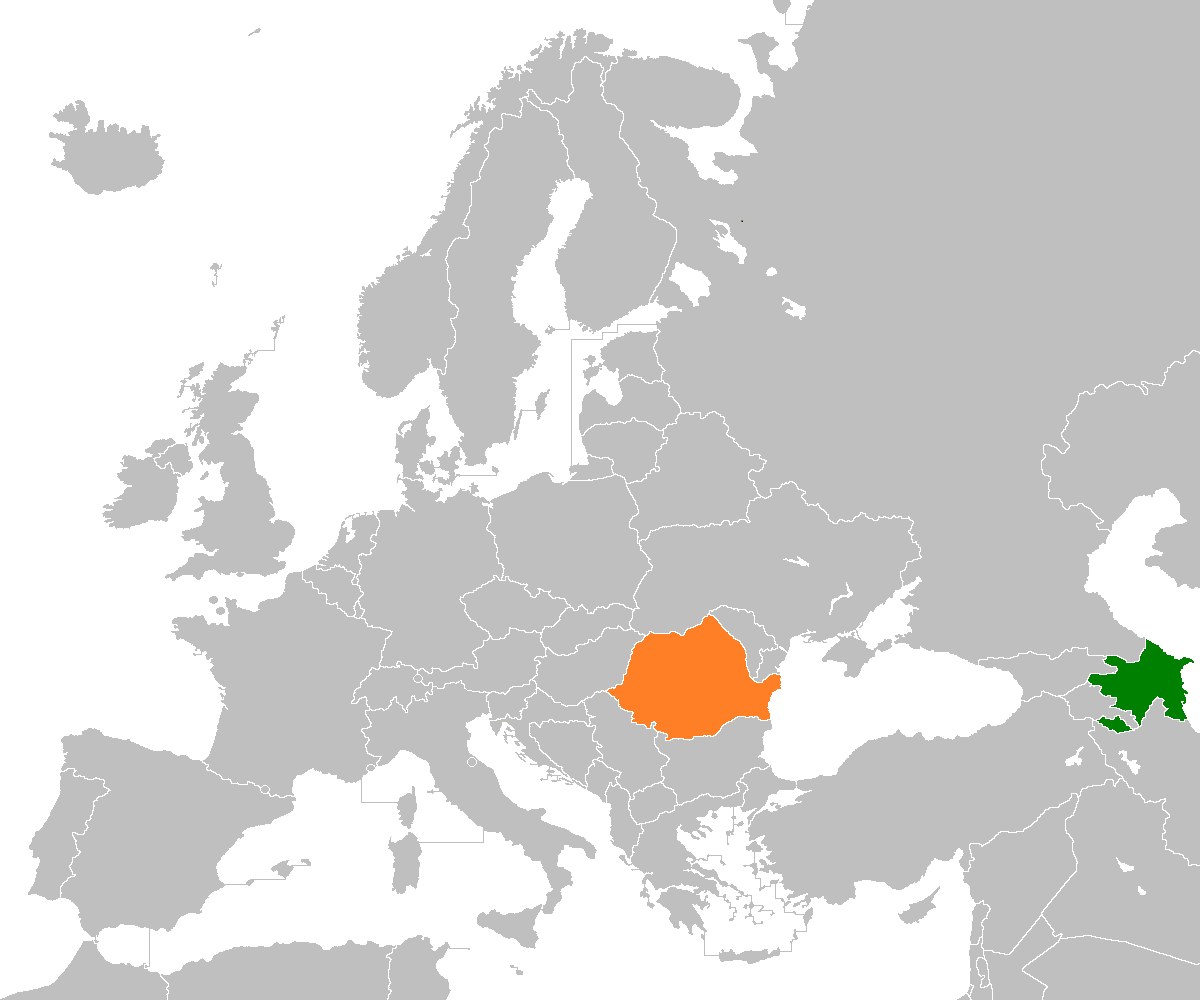

- Azerbaijan: Romania

Diplomatic mission
- Embassy of Azerbaijan, Bucharest: Embassy of Romania, Baku

Envoy
- Azerbaijan Ambassador to Romania Qudsi Osmanov: Romanian Ambassador to Azerbaijan Vasile Soare

Foreign relations exist between Azerbaijan and Romania. Azerbaijan has an embassy in Bucharest. Romania has an embassy in Baku. The Azerbaijani president visited Romania in October 2004 and the two nations have signed over fifty separate agreements to date. Both countries are full members of the Organization of the Black Sea Economic Cooperation and Council of Europe.

== History ==
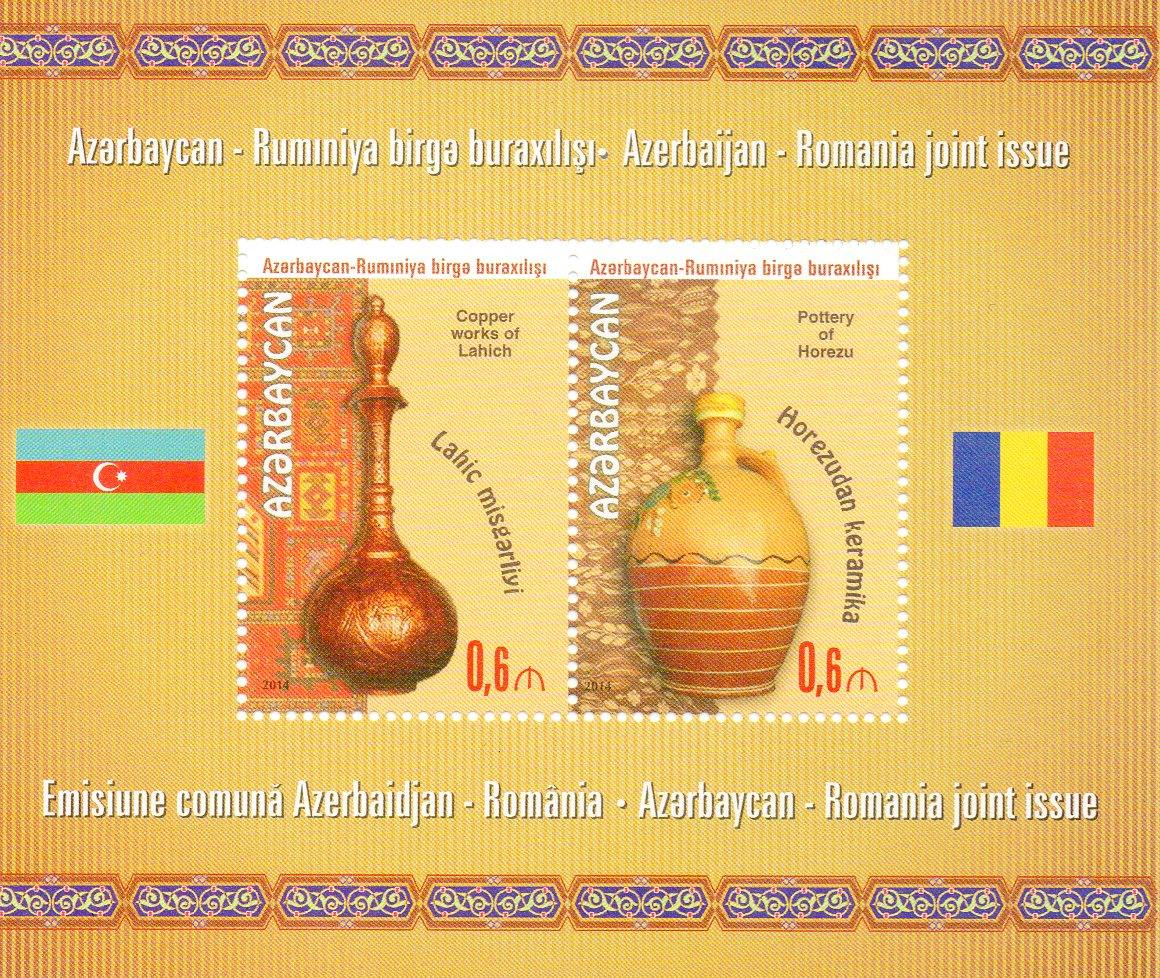
Stamps of Azerbaijan, 2014

Relations between the two countries date back to the 15th century when Uzun Hasan and Moldavian prince Stephen III signed an agreement on military cooperation. This cooperation continued during the Safavid reign. It is believed that the first printing work in Azerbaijan appeared with the help of prince Dimitrie Cantemir. Accompanying Peter the Great on his journey to the Ciscaspian territories, Dimitrie wrote the text of the appeal to the king to the local population in Azerbaijani. In World War I, the Kingdom of Romania was on the side of the Allies, while the Azerbaijan Democratic Republic was on the side of the Central Powers.

Romania officially recognized Azerbaijan's independence on December 11, 1991. The Embassy of Romania in Azerbaijan was opened on November 3, 1998, and Embassy of Azerbaijan in Romania on May 19, 2001. Daniel Cristian Ciobanu is an ambassador of Romania in Azerbaijan and Farid Abdinbayov is an ambassador of Azerbaijan in Romania appointed by decree of Azerbaijani president dated June 27, 2013.

The two countries established diplomatic relations on June 19, 1992. While the two share mutual areas in multiple areas, the main focus has been on trade and energy links, with trade delegations and frequent talks regarding the further development of such ties and an increase in bilateral trade since trade originating from Azerbaijan approximately five times the quantity ($161 million) of those from Romania ($31.83 million).

As an existing member, Romania has been a strong advocate of Azerbaijan's future membership of the North Atlantic Treaty Organization (NATO), pointing out the strategic importance of the country for trade and shipping, particularly with a view towards Afghanistan. In August 2025, Romania welcomed the peace agreement signed between Azerbaijan and Armenia. Romania also supports the peace process between Azerbaijan and Armenia.

== Agreements ==
In 2000, Azerbaijan and Romania signed an agreement on bilateral defence cooperation, followed by a similar agreement on information sharing in 2004. In December 2007, a Romanian energy delegation visited Azerbaijan. The two parties discussed a gas pipeline and emphasised the importance of the two nations' cooperation in order to provide "energy security in Europe".

== State visits ==
In 2004, the Azeri president made a two-day state visit to Romania, during which time, the two leaders held private meetings on a range of issues, including, inter alia, the relationship between the two countries and opportunities for cooperation on counter- terrorism. Eleven separate were signed as a result of these meetings. Also during this visit, the president officially opened a new embassy building, emphasising the role of the embassy in the continuation and development of relations between the nations.

=== High-level mutual visits ===
==== Presidents ====
	Date	Reason	Presidents
1	2 July 1995	official visit	President of Azerbaijan H. Aliyev
2	March 1996	official visit	President of Romania I. Iliescu
3	29 June – 1 July 1998	official visit	President of Romania E. Constantinescu
4	7 – 8 September 1998	working visit for International Conference on restoration of historical silk route	President of Romania E. Constantinescu
5	11-12 October 2004	official visit	President of Azerbaijan I. Aliyev
6	5 June 2006	working visit for “Black Sea Forum	President of Azerbaijan I. Aliyev
7	11-12 October 2006	official visit	President of Romania T. Băsescu
8	19 June 2007	working visit for GUAM Summit	President of Romania T. Băsescu
9	24-25 September 2007	working visit for opening of Tey Park – Heydar Aliyev Alley and Representation of Heydar Aliyev Foundation in Romania	President of Azerbaijan I. Aliyev
10	2-4 April 2008	working visit for NATO Bucharest Summit	President of Azerbaijan I. Aliyev
11	21 August 2008	working visit	President of Romania T. Băsescu
12	28-29 September 2009	official visit	President of Azerbaijan I. Aliyev
13	13-14 September 2010	working visit for AGRI Summit	President of Romania T. Băsescu
14	18-19 April 2011	official visit	President of Romania, T. Băsescu

==== Prime Ministers ====
	Date	Reason	Ministers
1	26-27 June 2013	official visit	Prime Minister of Romania, Mr. Victor Ponta

==== Chairmen of Parliament ====
Date	Reason	
18-20 December 2006	official visit	Chairman of Azerbaijani Parliament Ogtay Asadoy visited to Romania, and he met with President T. Băsescu and other top officials of Romanian parliament.
18-20 June 2008	visit on the occasion of 90th anniversary of the establishment of Parliament of Azerbaijan	a parliamentary delegation led by speaker of the senate Nicolae Vacaroiu
13-16 March 2013	official visit	Chairman of Chamber of Deputies, Valeriu Zgonea

== Documents ==
=== Political sphere ===
	Documents	Date	Location
1	Protocol on cooperation between Ministry of Foreign Affairs of Azerbaijan and Ministry of Foreign Affairs of Romania	27 April 1995	Baku
2	Memorandum of Intent between the Government of Azerbaijan and the Government of Romania	27 April 1995	Baku
3	Declaration on establishment of friendship relations and partnership between Azerbaijan and Romania	2 July 1995	Bucharest
4	Agreement on friendship relations and cooperation between the Azerbaijan and Romania	27 March 1996	Baku
5	Declaration on development of friendship relations and partnership between Azerbaijan and Romania	30 June 1998	Bucharest
6	Declaration on partnership between Azerbaijan and Romania	29 October 2002	Baku
7	Joint Declaration of President of Azerbaijan and President of Romania	2004 and 2006	Baku and Bucharest
8	Declaration on Agreement of establishing strategic partnership between Azerbaijan and Romania	28 September 2009	Bucharest
9	Joint Action Plan on the realization of strategic partnership between Azerbaijan and Romania	18 April 2011	Baku
10	Protocol of Cooperation between the Ministry of Foreign Affairs of Azerbaijan and the Ministry of Foreign Affairs of Romania	18 April 2011	Baku

== Resident diplomatic missions ==
- Azerbaijan has an embassy in Bucharest.
- Romania has an embassy in Baku.

== See also ==
- Foreign relations of Azerbaijan
- Foreign relations of Romania
- Azerbaijan-NATO relations
- Azerbaijan-EU relations
- Azerbaijanis in Romania
  - Azerbaijanis in Moldova
- Azerbaijanis in Europe
- Romanians in Azerbaijan
