= Soare (surname) =

Soare is a Romanian surname. Notable people with the surname include:

- Anastasia Soare (born 1957), Romanian-born American billionaire businesswoman
- Casian Soare (born 2006), Romanian footballer
- Gheorghe Soare (born 1929), Romanian equestrian
- Marius Soare (born 1987), Romanian football player
- Nicolae Soare (born 1991), Romanian long distance runner
- Nicolae Soare (footballer) (born 1964), Romanian footballer
- Robert I. Soare, American mathematician
- Valeriu Soare (born 1932), Romanian football player
- Vasile Soare (born 1957), Romanian diplomat

== See also ==
- Soare Sterian (1906–1970), Romanian rugby union player
