= Azerbaijan–Denmark relations =

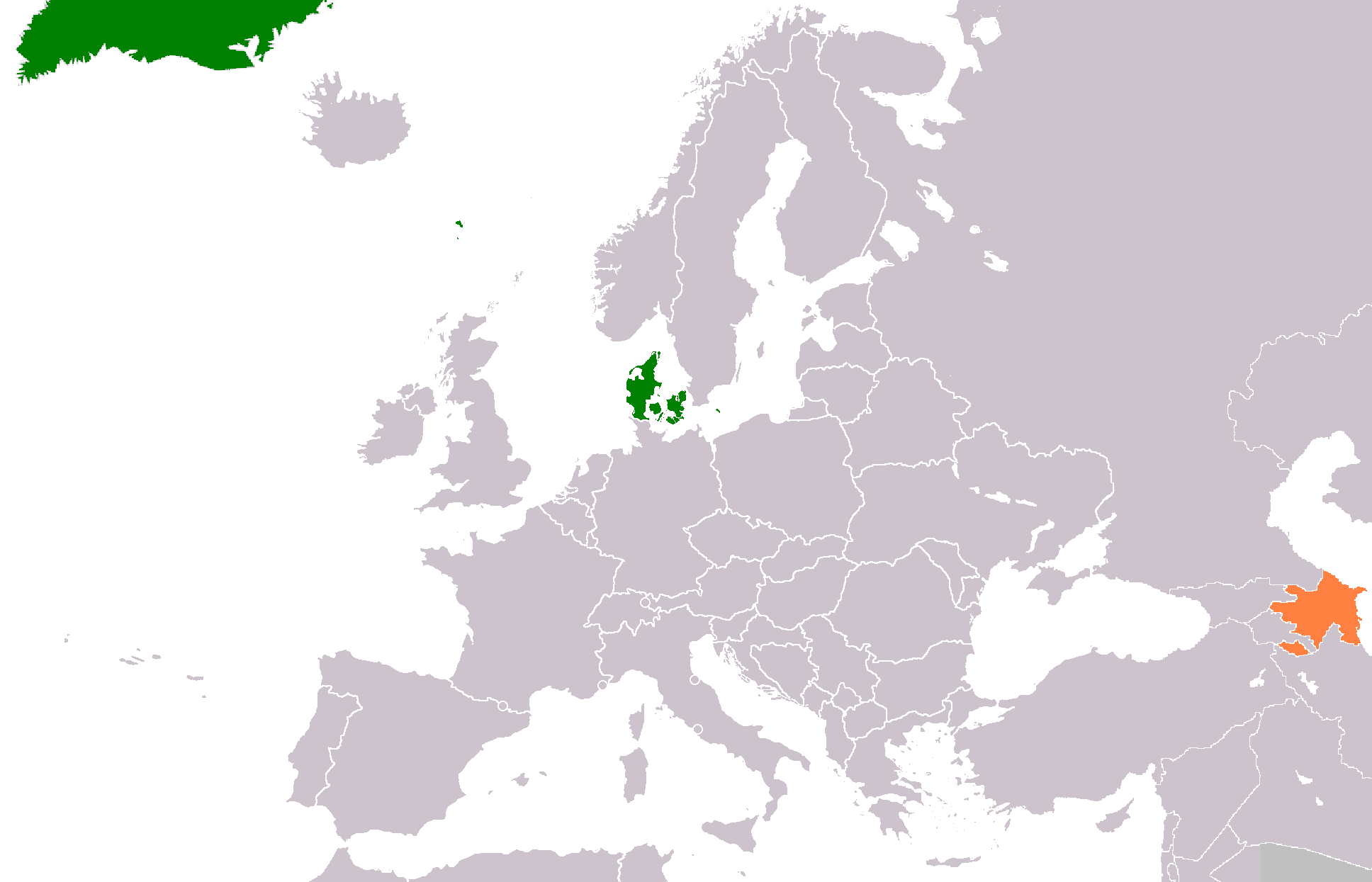

- Denmark: Azerbaijan

Azerbaijan–Denmark relations are the bilateral relations between Azerbaijan and Denmark. Azerbaijan's non-resident embassy for Denmark is located in London, United Kingdom. Denmark has a consulate in Baku. Denmark recognized the Independence of Azerbaijan on 31 December 1991. On 2 April 1992 the diplomatic relations between the two countries were established. Bilateral relations between the two countries are described as "friendly" and "cooperative".

== History ==
The first Danish diplomat to serve in Azerbaijan was Erik Biering, who was also consul for Armenia and Georgia in 1920.

Soviet Azerbaijan and Denmark maintained friendly relations, Soviet Azerbaijan had an envoy in Denmark. In 1996, the Danish Refugee Council opened an operation for refugees and IDPs. From 1997 to 2004, Denmark provided 14 million dollars to the Azerbaijani refugees. During the Jyllands-Posten Muhammad cartoons controversy, some Azerbaijanis took to the streets and protested against the cartoons. In 2010, diplomatic discussions have continued to explore the potential for further enhancement of the relationship, discussing issues such as the further development of economic trade.

== Cooperation ==
In 2006 Denmark abstained from voting for draft resolution "Long-term Conflicts on the territories of GUAM member-states: its impact on international peace, security and development". Ambassador Gurbanov stated that Danish companies have shown an increased interest in conducting business activities in Azerbaijan’s economy and "there exist great opportunities for deepening economic ties".

In 2004, The Azerbaijani parliament voted for the ratification of an Azerbaijani-Danish memorandum on implementation of the Kyoto Protocol under which Denmark committed itself to financing a series of projects aimed at reducing greenhouse gas emissions in Azerbaijan.

Denmark also cooperates with Azerbaijan in bringing peace and political stability to the Caucasus, Denmark has contributed $4 million to programs to achieve this. The 'Azerbaijan-Denmark Friendship Group' was established in the Azerbaijan parliament and is chaired by Azer Amirslanov. The Danish brewery company Carlsberg, bought Baku-Castel brewery in 2008. In 2011, Vestas delivered a wind farm with a capacity of 48 megawatts to Azerbaijan.

Danish company Arla Foods's white cheese is very popular in Azerbaijan. In three months, Arla has sold 1,5 million packs of Tetra Pak cheese to Azerbaijan.

== High level visits ==
On 6 March 1995 through 12 March 1995, President of Azerbaijan, Heydar Aliyev, visited Denmark. During his visit, he met with Queen Margrethe II of Denmark and the Prime Minister of Denmark Poul Nyrup Rasmussen. Danish Foreign Minister Per Stig Møller visited Azerbaijan to discuss the bilateral cooperation between Azerbaijan Denmark with Azerbaijani Foreign Minister Elmar Mammadyarov. Azerbaijani politician Bahar Muradova visited Denmark on 24 May 2010.

== Culture ==
On 31 May 2010, an event marking Azerbaijans Republic Day was held in Copenhagen. On 20 January 2011, the Denmark-Azerbaijan-Turkish Unity Society organized an event of the Black January anniversary in Copenhagen.

On 26 February 2011, a ceremony commemorating the Khojaly massacre took place in Denmark, bringing together representatives from the Turkish and Azerbaijani communities.

== See also ==
- Foreign relations of Azerbaijan
- Foreign relations of Denmark
- Azerbaijan-NATO relations
- Azerbaijan-EU relations
