= Albania–Azerbaijan relations =

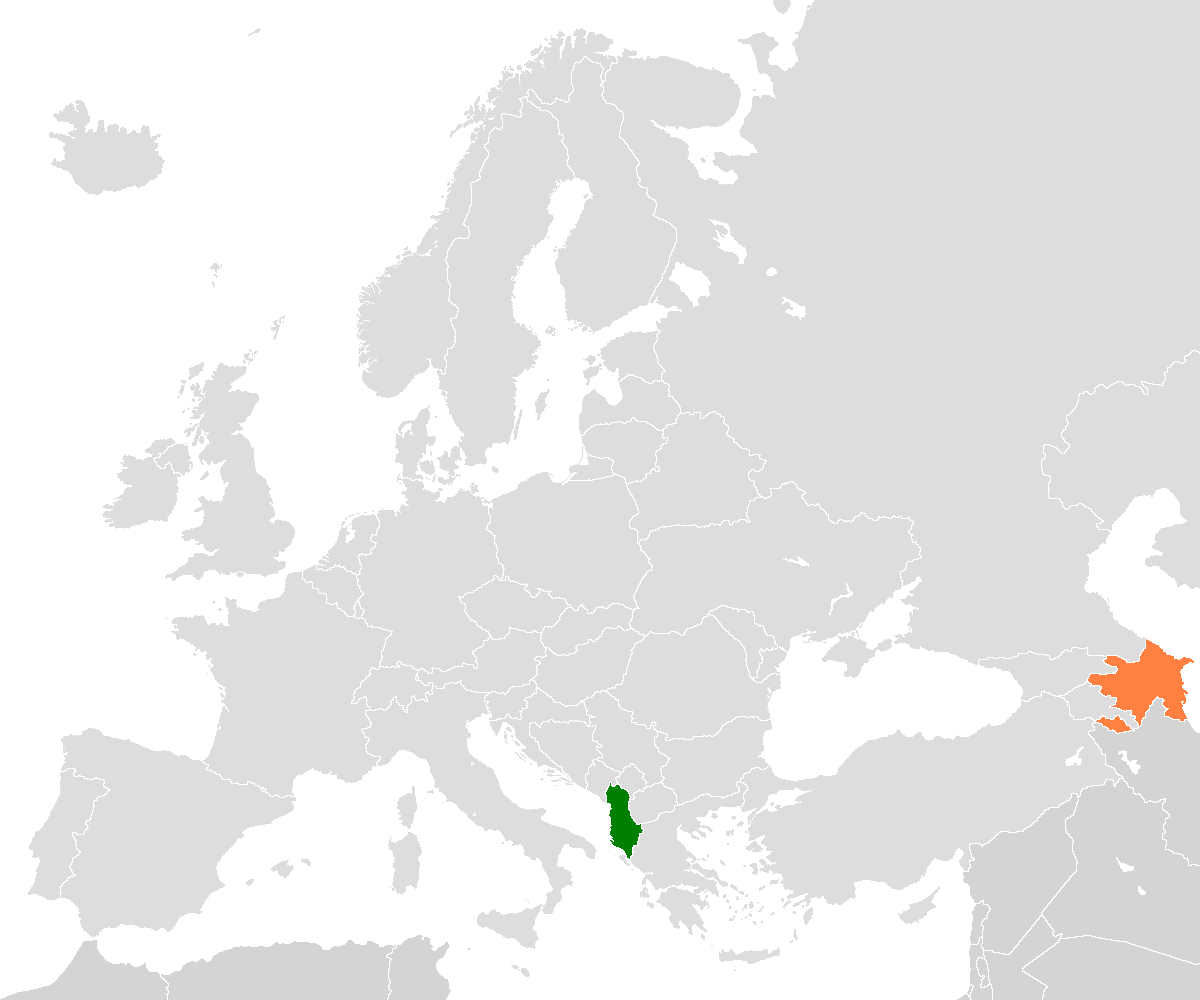

- Albania: Azerbaijan

Envoy
- Albania Ambassador to Azerbaijan: Azerbaijan Ambassador to Albania

Albania intends to open an embassy in Baku and Azerbaijan has accredited its ambassador in Athens with the additional position of Ambassador to Albania.

Both nations are predominantly Muslim and are part of the Organisation of Islamic Cooperation and the Council of Europe. Relations between the two countries were established on the 23 September 1992 after Azerbaijan achieved independence from the Soviet Union. Both countries are full members of the Organization of the Black Sea Economic Cooperation and Organisation of Islamic Cooperation and Council of Europe.

== Relations ==
Albania and Azerbaijan have been developing economic and cultural ties. Albania supports the territorial integrity of Azerbaijan and an end to the occupation of Azerbaijani territories by neighbouring states including Armenia.

On 26 November 2019, an earthquake struck the Durrës region of Albania. The Azerbaijani government donated 500,000 euros for humanitarian aid to Albania.

== Economic relations ==
Imports of Azerbaijan
Year	Amount Thousands of USD	% of total amount of imports
2020	385,95	
2021	657,93 ▲	0,01

Exports of Azerbaijan
Year	Amount Thousands of USD	% of total amount of exports
2020	0	0
2021	4 293,08 ▲	0,02

== See also ==
- Foreign relations of Albania
- Foreign relations of Azerbaijan
- Azerbaijan-NATO relations
