= Azerbaijan–NATO relations =

Azerbaijan-NATO relations

- NATO: Azerbaijan

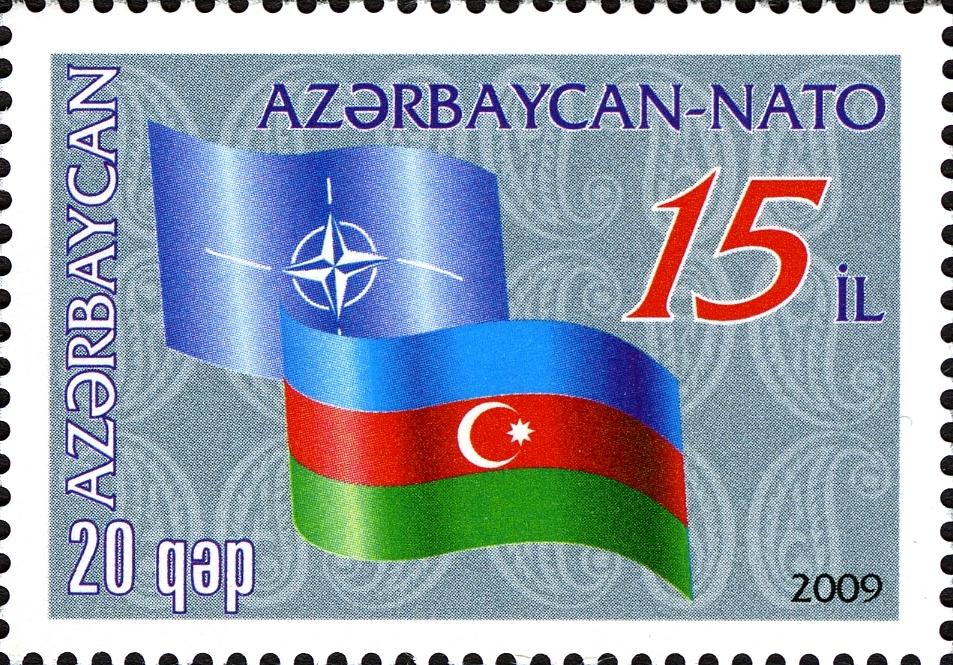
2009 Azerbaijani stamp dedicated to 15th anniversary of Azerbaijan-NATO relations

The relationship between Azerbaijan and NATO started in 1992 when Azerbaijan joined the newly created North Atlantic Cooperation Council. Considerable partnership between NATO and Azerbaijan dates back to 1994, when the latter joined the Partnership for Peace program. Azerbaijan established a diplomatic mission to NATO in 1997 by a Presidential Decree on 21 November.

== Background ==
NATO partnership in Europe: Members of NATO Membership Action Plan Intensified Dialogue / Individual Partnership Action Plan Partnership for Peace (PfP) Aspiring PfP members

Azerbaijan regained its independence on October 18, 1991, after the collapse of the Soviet Union. It was a founding member of the Collective Security Treaty Organization, an alternative Russian-led military alliance, in 1994, but withdrew in 1999. President Ilham Aliyev has generally supported neutrality since his rise to power in 2003. Azerbaijan made its policy of not being aligned with a geopolitical/military structure official when it became a full member of the Non-Aligned Movement in 2011.

As with other post-soviet states, Azerbaijan joined the NATO-run North Atlantic Cooperation Council in 1992 and signed the Partnership for Peace (PfP) Framework Document to develop security and defense cooperation with NATO on May 4, 1994. A PfP Presentation Document was approved on April 19, 1996 by the President of Azerbaijan and submitted to Javier Solana, the Secretary General of NATO on April 23. Azerbaijan's first Individual Partnership Program was confirmed by North Atlantic Council on October 14, 1996. In November 1997, Azerbaijan joined the PfP Planning and Review Process to involve Azerbaijan more tightly in defense planning of NATO operations. Azerbaijan established a diplomatic Mission to NATO in 1997 by the Presidential Decree on 21 November. A special Commission on Cooperation with NATO was established according to the decree of the President of Azerbaijan on 12 November 1997.

NATO Political Committee discussed Azerbaijan's attendance in the PfP in "19+1" format on 12 May 1998. PfP SOFA and its Additional Protocol was signed by Azerbaijan on 15 November 1998. In September 1999 EAPC ad hoc working group was formed to explore regional collaboration in the Caucasus.

Azerbaijan became an associate member due to the decision of NATO Parliamentary Assembly in November 2002, and joined NATO Operational Capabilities Concept in March 2004. On 28 June 2004, at the Istanbul Summit, Caucasus region was discussed and member states decided to create the position of Special Representative for the Caucasus and Central Asia. On September 15, the first Special Representative of NATO's Secretary General for the Caucasus was appointed. Azerbaijan hosted NATO military exercises and high-profile meetings in 2009.

During the terms of office of Ilham Aliyev, collaboration between NATO and Azerbaijan was extended, as the latter joined the Individual Partnership Action Plan in 2004. The president issued a decree to establish a Working Group on National Security Policy of Azerbaijan on September 17, 2004 with the aim of implementing reforms in security sector mentioned in the IPAP document. After Azerbaijan's first IPAP was confirmed by NAC on 27 May 2005, Ilham Aliyev issued a decree on the execution of IPAP on third of August. There was an agreement between NATO and Azerbaijan on the second IPAP on March 7, 2008.Azerbaijan has completed NATO-Azerbaijan IPAP documents for the first (2005-2007), second (2008-2010), third (2011-2013), and the fourth period (2015-2016).

The conflict over Nagorno-Karabakh with Armenia presented a major roadblock to Azerbaijani membership of NATO, with concerns that this would lead to stronger Russian support of Armenia in the dispute. Member countries of NATO supported Azerbaijan's territorial integrity under the Declarations issued at the meeting of NAC held in Riga on 28–29 November 2006, at the NATO/EAPC and ISAF format Summits held in Bucharest on 2–4 April 2008, at the Strasbourg-Kehl Summit of NATO held on 3–4 April 2009. The 2023 Azerbaijani offensive in Nagorno-Karabakh led to Azerbaijan regaining control of the territory, resolving the conflict.

The President of Azerbaijan participated in the Meetings of Heads of States and Governments on Afghanistan during the NATO Summit in Chicago in 2012, in Wales in September 2014, and in Warsaw In July 2016. On 8 August 2025, NATO welcomed the signing of a peace agreement between Azerbaijan and Armenia. NATO announced its full support for the normalization process between Azerbaijan and Armenia.

== Peacekeeping activities involving Azerbaijan ==
=== Kosovo ===
Azerbaijan participated in NATO-led peacekeeping and peace-support operations (KFOR) in Kosovo in 1999-2008. Azerbaijan sent a unit composed of 34 servicemen (32 soldiers, a warrant officer, an officer) to Kosovo on the 1st of September 1999 and the contingent started to operate within the Turkish-led 4th Mechanized Infantry Company in Dragas. Overall, 362 personnel from Azerbaijan (345 soldiers, 7 warrant officers, 10 officers) served in the mission in Kosovo. Azerbaijani military officers completed their mission on KFOR on March 4, 2008 after political situation changed in Kosovo.

=== Iraq ===
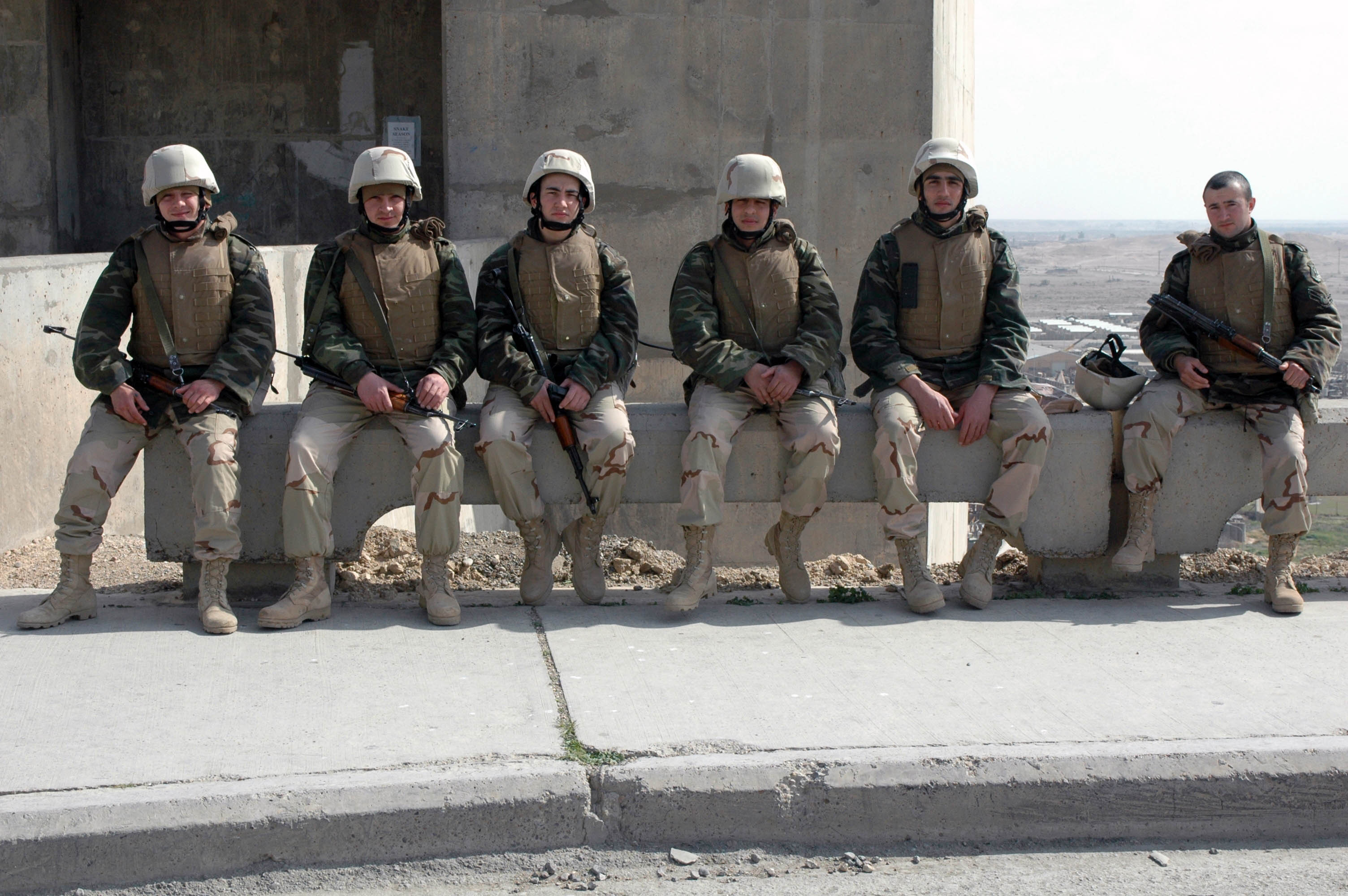
Azerbaijani peacekeepers, securing the Haditha Dam.

The military contingent of Azerbaijan composed of 151 personnel (120 soldiers, 16 warrant officers, 15 officers) took part in the peacekeeping mission within the International Coalition Forces of Iraq from 15 August 2003 until 7 December 2008. Azerbaijani group was assigned to provide security of water reservoir and hydroelectric power station situated in Haditha. Azerbaijan pulled out its forces from Iraq on 7 December 2008, due to the withdrawal of Coalition Forces.

=== Afghanistan ===
Azerbaijan sent a military unit consisted of 22 servicemen to support ISAF operation in Afghanistan on November 15, 2002. Azerbaijan doubled the number of the unit according to the Decision adopted on October 2, 2008 by Milli Majlis. Since February 2009, Azerbaijani 90 personnel served under the Turkish company led by ISAF. Azerbaijani group was assigned to protect a television tower situated in Kabul, provide security of central ammunition depot of ISAF and to fulfill patrol service. Since 2015, 94 servicemen in Afghanistan supported a new "Resolute Support" non-combat mission of NATO with the task to maintain the security of Kabul International Airport after ISAF operation finished. Azerbaijan increased the number of servicemen attending the "Resolute Support" mission from 94 to 120 by sending the peacekeepers to Afghanistan on January 9, 2018 based on the amendment to the Resolution "On giving consent to the deployment and participation in the relevant operations in Afghanistan of a platoon of the Armed Forces of the Republic of Azerbaijan as part of the battalion of the Armed Forces of the Republic of Turkey and under the general command of NATO structures" by the Parliament of Azerbaijan dated 29 December 2017.

== Bilateral visits ==
The President of Azerbaijan Heydar Aliyev visited NATO Headquarters in Brussels to present PfP Presentation Document of Azerbaijan to the Secretary General of NATO on April 23, 1996. NATO Secretary General Javier Solana paid a visit to Azerbaijan on 13 February 1997. On his trip to Baku on 30 September-1 October 1998, Mr. Solana visited to Baku Senior Military School and Peacekeeping Unit of Azerbaijani Armed Forces.

Admiral Guido Venturoni, the Chairman of the NATO Military Committee visited Azerbaijan and discussed NATO-Azerbaijan military cooperation with authorities on 27–28 April 2000. Secretary General George Robertson visited Azerbaijan on 16–17 January 2001 and held discussions with government officials besides the President of the country. Rafael Estrella, the President of NATO PA paid a visit to Azerbaijan on 17–18 January 2002 according to the invitation of the Chairman of the Milli Majlis.

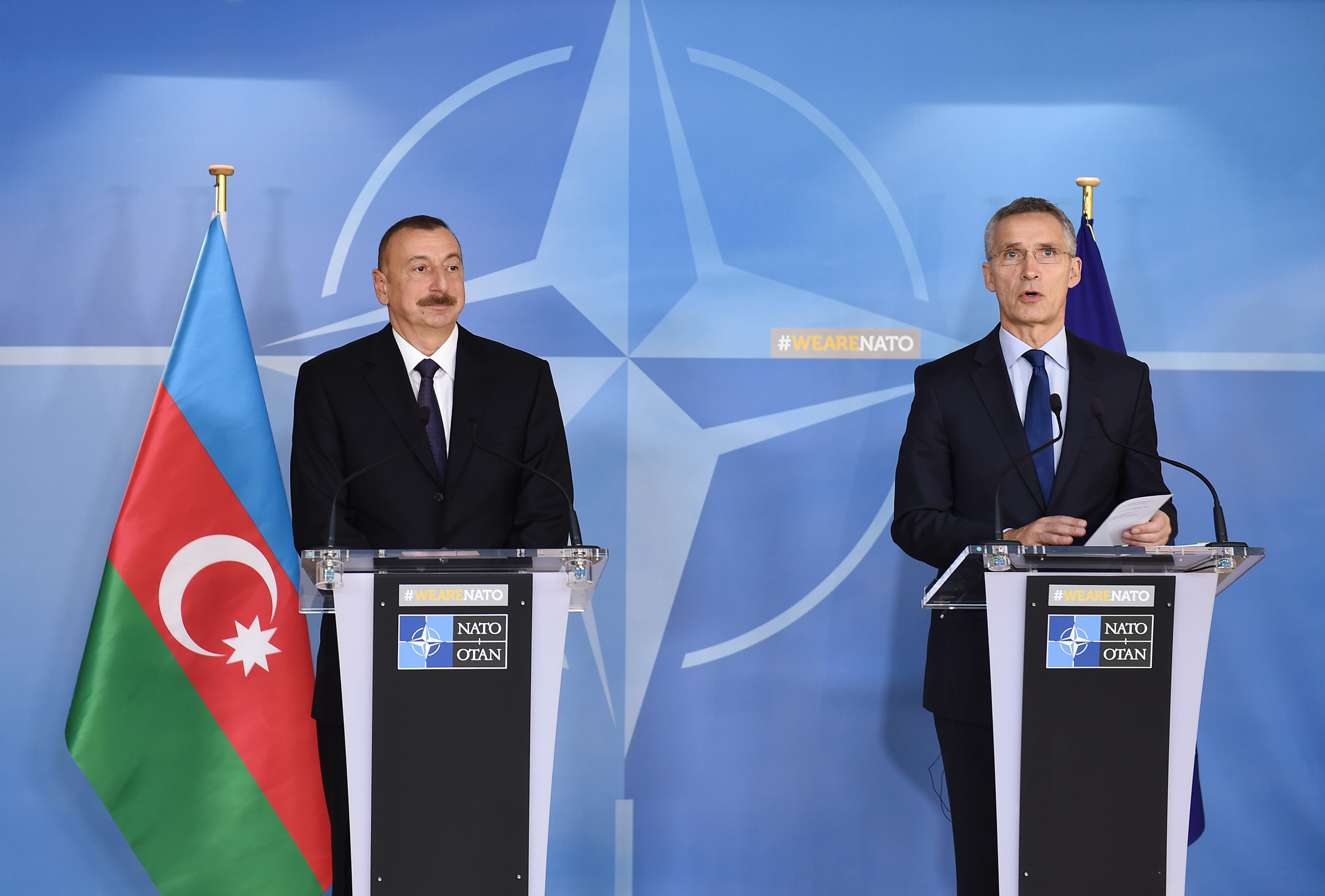
Azerbaijani President Ilham Aliyev and NATO Secretary General Jens Stoltenberg at a press conference

Lord George Robertson visited Azerbaijan in 2003 and took part in the inauguration of the Virtual Silk Highway Project on May 15. During his visit, Azerbaijan officially informed its intention to join the IPAP to the Secretary General of NATO.

During the trip of Elmar Mammadyarov, Minister of Foreign Affairs of Azerbaijan to Brussels on 6 July 2004, Azerbaijan's participation in IPAP was reviewed. Mr. Mammadyarov visited NATO HQ in Brussels on May 2, 2007, on 17 September and 9 December 2008. He visited NATO HQ and took part in NAC+Azerbaijan meeting on July 15, 2009. The first IPAP document of Azerbaijan was presented to NATO by the President Ilham Aliyev during his visit to Brussels on May 19, 2004. In his next visit to Brussels (May 2006), I. Aliyev participated in the spring session of NATO Parliamentary Assembly. Ilham Aliyev met with Secretary General Jaap de Hoop Scheffer during his trip to NATO Headquarters on November 8, and on April 29 before the meeting of North Atlantic Council.Anders Fogh Rasmussen welcomed I.Aliyev at NATO Headquarters in February 2012, and they discussed the possible future enhancement of cooperation between Azerbaijan and NATO. As part of his working visit to Brussels in 2014, the President Aliyev met with NATO Secretary General and participated in the meeting of North Atlantic Council.

NATO delegation has paid reciprocal visit to Baku in the framework of its cooperation with Azerbaijan. NATO Secretaries-General Jaap de Hoop Scheffer (2004–2009), Anders Fogh Rasmussen (2009–2014) visited Azerbaijan and held meetings with the President and Minister of Foreign Affairs of Azerbaijan in November 2004, and In September 2012 respectively. Secretary General's Special Representatives (Robert Simmons (2004–2010), James Appathurai) for the Caucasus and Central Asia paid visits to Azerbaijan in February and November 2005, April and October 2006, March and September 2007, June 2010, July 2011, February and July 2012, May 2013, July 2014, February 2016.

José Lello, President of the NATO PA, visited Baku on March 5, 2008. Deputy Secretary General of NATO Claudio Bisogniero visited Azerbaijan on 16 December 2008 and met with high-level officials of Azerbaijan to discuss the issues of common interest.

In September 2017, Chairman of the NATO Military Committee Petr Pavel also visited Azerbaijan. He met with the Chief of Defense of the Azerbaijan Armed Forces and First Deputy Defense Minister, General Najmaddin Sadikov and had a discussion on the benefits of NATO – Azerbaijan partnership, Azerbaijan's participation in NATO-led operations, in addition to regional and European security.

Azerbaijani President Ilham Aliyev met with NATO Secretary General Jens Stoltenberg during his visit to Brussels on 23 November 2017 and discussed NATO-Azerbaijan cooperation and security issues in South Caucasus. Between 9–11 July 2024, Azerbaijani Foreign Minister Jeyhun Bayramov participated in the NATO 2024 Washington summit.

On November 6, President of the Republic of Azerbaijan Ilham Aliyev received a NATO delegation. During the meeting, President Ilham Aliyev emphasized that the Azerbaijani Army has been aligned with NATO standards and highlighted the close cooperation between the Azerbaijani and Turkish armed forces within this framework. He noted the importance of expanding relations between Azerbaijan and NATO. President Aliyev also stated that cooperation between Azerbaijan and NATO in areas such as regional development, energy security, and other strategic directions remains on the agenda.

== Cooperation in non-military areas ==
=== Humanitarian and environmental cooperation ===
Azerbaijan cooperates with NATO on the issues relating to security, defense, civil emergency planning, science and information, public information. In 2006, Euro-Atlantic Center was officially inaugurated in Baku.Azerbaijan carries on using training, assessment, and review tools of the Operational Capabilities Concept (OCC) Evaluation and Feedback (E&F) program in order to complete the Planning and Review Process (PARP) and to achieve a higher level of cooperation with NATO forces. Joint Azerbaijan-NATO Education and Training Action Plan was developed and accomplished in 2008-2013 to enhance the implementation of NATO standards in military education institutions in Azerbaijan.

==== NATO/PfP Saloglu Trust Fund project ====
Azerbaijan and NATO signed the agreement for the PfP Trust Fund Project on 2 April 2003. After a short time, Azerbaijan introduced Saloglu Trust Fund Project to address unexploded ordnances (UXOs) problem in Azerbaijan on April 23. The project to clear UXOs from a former military base at Saloglu, Agstafa was approved by the member states and as the executive bodies of the project, NAMSA and Azerbaijan National Agency for Mine Action (ANAMA) were appointed. Saloglu Trust Fund was opened in November 2005 with the participation of NATO Secretary General's Special Representative.

==== Mélange project ====
Azerbaijan established a mobile mélange treatment plant to get fertilizer from highly toxic substance with the support of Science for Peace and Security Program of NATO in July 2006. Neutralizing the mélange was started from Alat. Approximately 950 tonnes of mélange was converted and stored in Alat until November 2007, and then moved to Mingachevir. The remaining 350 tonnes of mélange was neutralized by May 2008.

==== Jeyranchol NATO Partnership Trust Fund Project ====
Another Trust Fund project (Jeyranchol Clearance Project) was implemented to clean an area of 64 km^{2} from land mines and UXOs in Jeyranchol in 3 stages. At the first stage 19 km^{2} area was cleaned between 2012-2014 with the support of NATO Support Agency (former NAMSA).The second stage started in July 2014 was completed in September 2016.

=== Science for peace and security ===
Azerbaijan completed the following projects under NATO SPS Program:

- Emerging Security Challenges: Enhancing energy security in the XXI century;
- Seismic Hazard and Risk Assessment for Southern Caucasus–Eastern Turkey energy corridors;
- Hands-on Cyber Defense Training Course for System/Network Administrators.

== Relationship timeline ==
Event	Date
Partnership for Peace	1994-05-04

== Azerbaijan's foreign relations with NATO member states ==
- Albania
- Belgium
- Bulgaria
- Canada
- Croatia
- Czech Republic
- Denmark
- Estonia
- Finland
- France
- Germany
- Greece
- Hungary
- Iceland
- Italy
- Latvia
- Lithuania
- Luxembourg
- Montenegro
- Netherlands
- North Macedonia
- Norway
- Poland
- Portugal
- Romania
- Slovakia
- Slovenia
- Spain
- Sweden
- Turkey
- United Kingdom
- United States

== See also ==
- Azerbaijani peacekeeping forces
- Foreign relations of Azerbaijan
- Foreign relations of NATO
- Enlargement of NATO
- Individual Partnership Action Plan
- NATO open door policy
- Partnership for Peace
- Azerbaijan-EU relations
- Armenia–NATO relations
- Belarus–NATO relations
- Georgia–NATO relations
- Moldova–NATO relations
- Russia–NATO relations
- Ukraine–NATO relations
