= Azerbaijan–Montenegro relations =

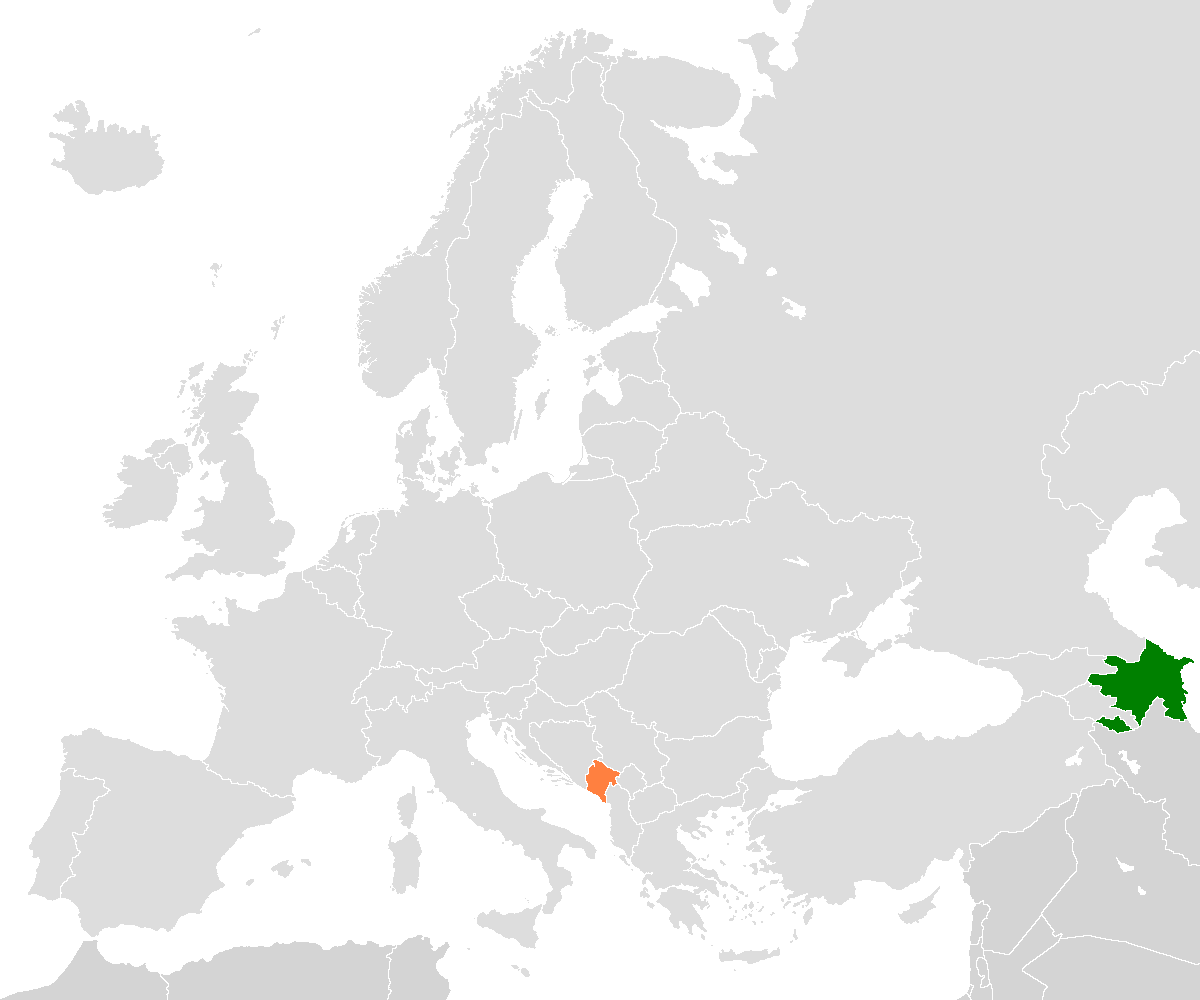

- Azerbaijan: Montenegro

The diplomatic relations between Azerbaijan and Montenegro were established in 2008 after Azerbaijan recognized the independence of Montenegro. Azerbaijan has a Diplomatic Office in Podgorica. Montenegro has an embassy in Baku.

== Overview ==
Azerbaijan recognized the independence of Montenegro on July 24, 2006. On April 24, 2008 diplomatic relations between these two countries were established.

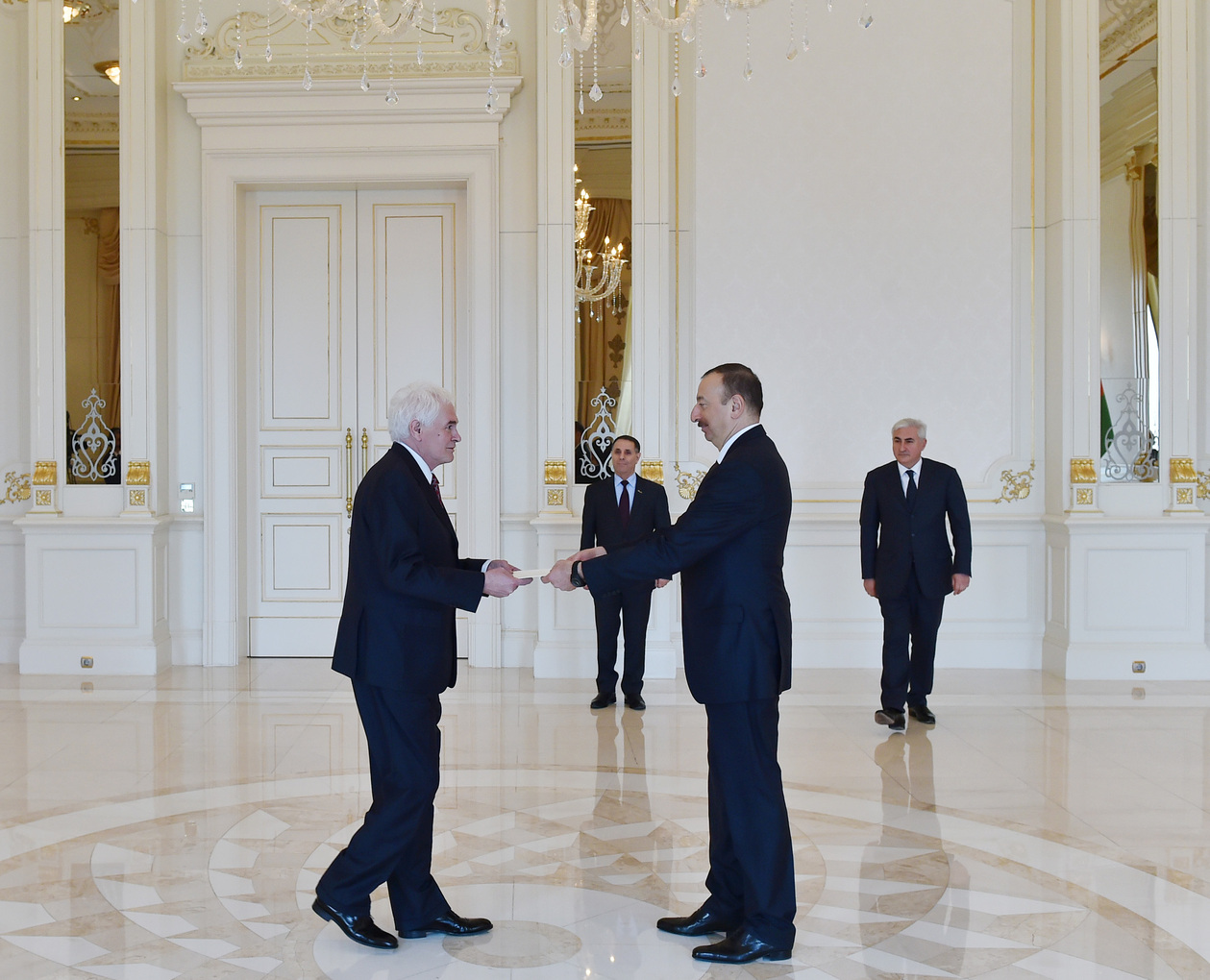
President of the Republic of Azerbaijan Ilham Aliyev received credentials of newly appointed Ambassador Extraordinary and Plenipotentiary of Montenegro Branko Milic

Ambassador of Azerbaijan to Romania Eldar Hasanov (who is now serving as the Ambassador of Azerbaijan to Serbia, Montenegro, Bosnia and Herzegovina) was appointed the Ambassador to Montenegro by the Presidential Decree issued on 28 July 2010. Mr. Hasanov presented his credentials to the President of Montenegro Filip Vujanovic on October 6, 2010. On the other hand, Ambassador of Montenegro to Turkey serves as the Ambassador to Azerbaijan at the same time. Branko Milic is the Ambassador of Montenegro to Azerbaijan since his credentials were accepted by the President of Azerbaijan Ilham Aliyev on 28 March 2015.

Diplomatic Mission of Azerbaijan started to operate in Podgorica in April 2012. Honorary Consulate of Montenegro was opened in Baku in December 2013.

== High-level visits ==
Former President of Montenegro Filip Vujanović paid an official visit to Azerbaijan in September 2011 which is followed by working visits in 2012, 2013, 2015 and 2017. Azerbaijani President Ilham Aliyev visited Montenegro in March 2013. Incumbent president of Montenegro Milo Dukanovic paid a visit to Azerbaijan in March 2019 due to the invitation of Ilham Aliyev for the participation in the 7th Global Baku Forum.

Apart from the visits of head of states, other high-ranked officials (e.g. Prime Ministers of Montenegro in 2012, 2014 and 2015, Minister of foreign affairs of Montenegro in 2010, Minister of foreign affairs of Azerbaijan in 2011, Minister of economic development of Azerbaijan in 2011 and 2014, Minister of culture of Montenegro in 2011 and 2013, Minister of Agriculture of Montenegro in 2013, Minister of Tourism of Montenegro in 2014) also had mutual visits. Chairman of Montenegrin Parliament Ranko Krivokapic visited Azerbaijan in 2014, while Chairman of the Milli Majlis of Azerbaijan Ogtay Asadov visited Montenegro on the occasion of 10th anniversary of the Montenegro's restoration of independence in May 2016.

== Inter-parliamentary relations ==
The inter-parliamentary cooperation between the two countries is carried out by the Working Group on Azerbaijan-Montenegro inter-parliamentary relations from Azerbaijan. Milli Majlis established the Working Group on Azerbaijan-Montenegro inter-parliamentary relations on 8 April 2011. According to the decision of Milli Majlis dated 4 March 2016, the head of the Working Group on Azerbaijan-Montenegro inter-parliamentary relations is Igbal Mammadov.

== Economic relations ==
Bilateral merchandise trade between Azerbaijan and Portugal totaled 1907 €, while import volume of Montenegro was 87 €, and export was 1 821 € for January - September 2018.

Trade turnover between Azerbaijan and Montenegro (in thousand USD)
| Year | Import | Export | Trade Turnover |
| 2011 | - | 3.7 | 3.7 |
| 2012 | 8.4 | 2.2 | 10.6 |
| 2013 | 0.4 | 11.5 | 11.9 |
| 2014 | 0.4 | 84.9 | 85.3 |
| 2015 | 0.5 | 3.8 | 4.3 |
| 2016 | 0.1 | 16.5 | 16.6 |
| 2017 | 117.9 | 24.3 | 142.2 |
Extracted from stat.gov.az

== Resident diplomatic missions ==
- Azerbaijan is accredited to Montenegro from its embassy in Belgrade, Serbia and maintains an embassy office in Podgorica.
- Montenegro is accredited to Azerbaijan from its embassy in Ankara, Turkey and maintains an embassy office in Baku.

== See also ==
- Foreign relations of Azerbaijan
- Foreign relations of Montenegro
- Azerbaijan-NATO relations
