= Azerbaijan–Portugal relations =

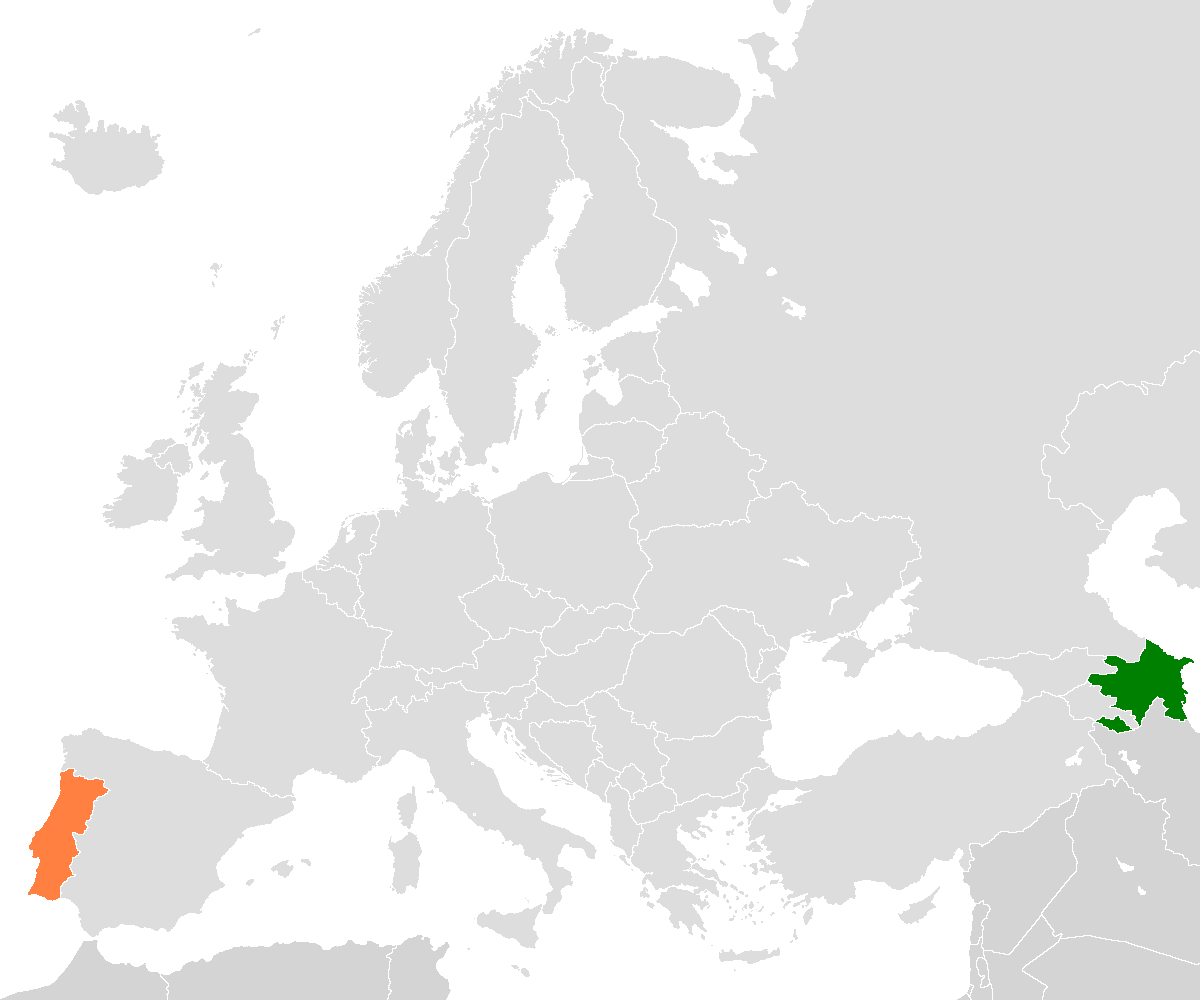

- Azerbaijan: Portugal

The diplomatic relations between Azerbaijan and Portugal were established in 1992 after Portugal recognized the independence of Azerbaijan.

== Overview ==
Portugal recognized the independence of Azerbaijan on 7 January 1992. On 4 August 1992, diplomatic relations between Azerbaijan and Portugal were established.

Ambassador of Azerbaijan to Morocco Tarik Aliyev was appointed as the Ambassador to Portugal by the Presidential Decree issued on 21 December 2012. Aliyev presented his credentials to the president of Portugal Aníbal Cavaco Silva on 14 January 2013. Portugal's Ambassador to Turkey also serves as the Ambassador to Azerbaijan. Paula Leal da Silva is the Ambassador of Portugal to Azerbaijan since her credentials were accepted by the President of Azerbaijan Ilham Aliyev on 26 March 2017.

In 2015, the Diplomatic Mission of Portugal in Azerbaijan started to operate. The chargé d'affaires is Jorge Gabriel Silva da Fonseca.

June 19, 2026, the Embassy of Azerbaijan in Portugal was established.

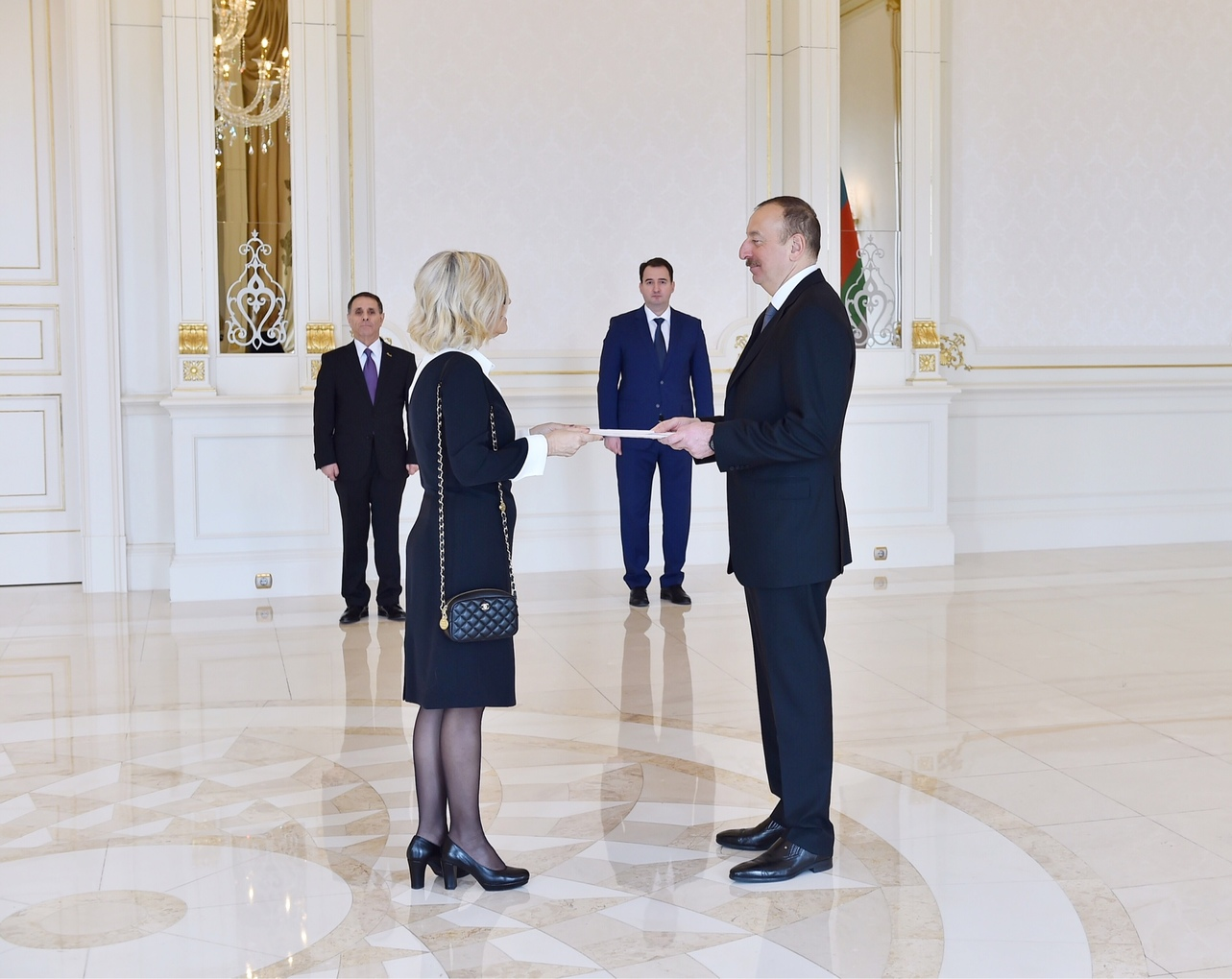
President of the Republic of Azerbaijan Ilham Aliyev received credentials of newly appointed Ambassador Extraordinary and Plenipotentiary of Portugal Paula Leal da Silva

== High-level visits ==
In 1994, during the OSCE summit in Budapest, The former president of Azerbaijan Heydar Aliyev met with the head of the Portuguese government. In October 1995, H. Aliyev met with President of Portugal Mario Soares in New York.

Heydar Aliyev paid a visit to Portugal to attend the Lisbon Summit of OSCE on 2–3 December 1996. During this trip H. Aliyev met with the Prime Minister of Portugal António Guterres. Former Ministers of Foreign Affairs of Portugal Jaime Gama visited Azerbaijan in July 2001 and in March 2002; and Luís Amado paid a visit to Azerbaijan in July 2010.

On 26–30 November 2001, Deputy Minister of Culture S. Mammadaliyeva took part in the international conference "Regional projects: ecology and protection of cultural heritage in Europe”, organized by the Council of Europe and the Ministry of ecology of Portugal in Lisbon.

On 27–28 April 2008, the Ambassador of Portugal to Azerbaijan, Jose Manuel de Carvalo Lameiras, paid a visit to Baku.

The president of Azerbaijan Ilham Aliyev visited Portugal to participate Lisbon Summit of NATO on 20–21 November 2010. During the trip of Azerbaijani representations, agreement between Portugal and Azerbaijan was signed on visa exemptions for those who hold diplomatic passports.

On 5–7 September 2011, to gain the support of Portugal regarding Azerbaijan's candidacy for non-permanent membership in the UN Security Council for 2012–2013, Ambassador S. Agabekov made a trip to Lisbon.

Minister of State and Foreign Affairs of Portugal Paulo Portas had an official trip to Azerbaijan in June 2012.

On 24–29 October 2013, Rafael Huseynov, a member of the Milli Majlis of Azerbaijan, was on a visit to Lisbon to participate in a meeting of the Committee on Culture, Science, Education, and Media of the Parliamentary Assembly of the Council of Europe.

On 3–6 March 2014, a delegation headed by the Executive Director of the State Oil Fund of Azerbaijan Sh. Movsumov visited Lisbon.

== Inter-parliamentary relations ==
The inter-parliamentary cooperation between the two countries is carried out by the Working Group on Azerbaijan-Portugal inter-parliamentary relations from Azerbaijan. Milli Majlis established the Working Group on Azerbaijan-Portugal inter-parliamentary relations on 5 December 2000. According to the decision of Milli Majlis dated 4 March 2016, the head of the Working Group on Azerbaijan-Portugal inter-parliamentary relations is Agiya Nakhchivanli.

== Economic relations ==
Bilateral merchandise trade between Azerbaijan and Portugal totaled 352,62 million USD, while import volume of Azerbaijan was US$7,33 million, and export was S345,29 million for January–September 2017. For the same period (January–September 2017), the share of Portugal was 2.46% in the foreign trade turnover of Azerbaijan, including 0.12% in imports and 4.24% in exports. Azerbaijan-Portugal business forum was conducted in Baku in June 2012 organized by Azerbaijan Export and Investment Promotion Foundation (AZPROMO) with the support of the Ministry of Economic Development of Azerbaijan.

Trade turnover between Azerbaijan and Portugal (in thousands of US$)
Year	Import	Export	Trade Turnover
2002	1,928.3	2,983.8	4,912.1
2003	266.3	30.7	297.0
2004	1,901.3	2,932.9	4,834.2
2005	6,229.4	8,545.7	14,775.1
2006	3,153.2	19,215.1	22,368.3
2007	5 093,8	-	5,093.8
2008	4 566,3	260,991.8	265,558.1
2009	1 183,1	28,456.7	29,639.8
2010	753,8	224,613.5	225,367.3
2011	2,594.8	324,860.0	327,454.9
2012	2,913.6	243,085.1	245,998.7
2013	2,443.1	525,759.4	528,202.5
2014	6,489.3	552,149.5	558,638.8
2015	26,204.5	368,874.4	395,078.9
2016	10,989.9	257,147.3	268,137.2
Extracted from stat.gov.az

== Diplomatic missions ==
Neither country has a resident ambassador.

- Azerbaijan is accredited to Portugal from its embassy in Rabat, Morocco.
- Portugal is accredited to Azerbaijan from its embassy in Ankara, Turkey.

== See also ==
- Foreign relations of Azerbaijan
- Foreign relations of Portugal
- Azerbaijan-NATO relations
- Azerbaijan-EU relations
