= Azerbaijan–Lithuania relations =

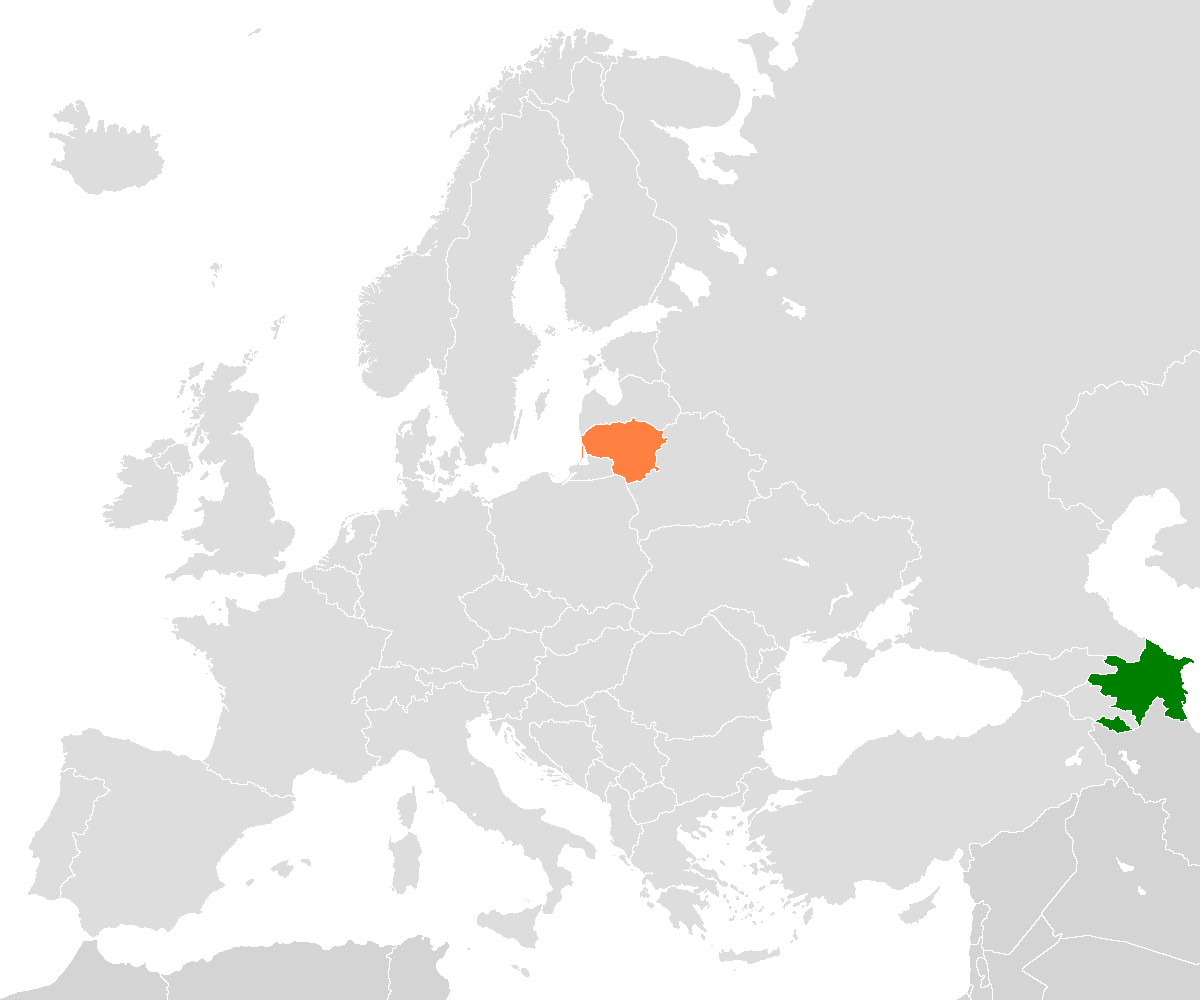

- Azerbaijan: Lithuania

Azerbaijan–Lithuania relations refers to the bilateral relations between Azerbaijan and Lithuania. Both countries were Republics of the Soviet Union and are Post-Soviet states.

== Diplomatic relations ==
The government of Azerbaijan recognized the independence of Lithuania on September 10, 1991. The government of Lithuania recognized the independence of Azerbaijan on December 20, 1991.

Diplomatic relations between Azerbaijan and Lithuania were established on November 27, 1995.

The Lithuanian Consular Department in Baku has been functioning since March 27, 1991. In 2010, the intergovernmental Commission on economic cooperation was established. To date, five meetings of this Commission have been held.

Azerbaijan has had its representative office in Lithuania since September 6, 2007 (Vilnius), just as Lithuania has had its representative office in Azerbaijan since April 3, 2007 (Baku).

Kęstutis VAŠKELEVIČIUS is the extraordinary Ambassador of Lithuania to Azerbaijan. Azerbaijan's Ambassador to Lithuania is Dr. Tamerlan GARAYEV.

The Embassy of Lithuania in Azerbaijan carries out joint activities with the State Archive of Lithuania and various archives of Azerbaijan.

On April 6, 2009, the Minister of Foreign Affairs of Lithuania Vigaudas Usackas met with the Minister of Foreign Affairs of Azerbaijan Elmar Mammadyarov in Baku. The meeting was followed by a joint press conference by the two ministers.

The inter-parliamentary friendship group "Lithuania-Azerbaijan" is functioning. The head of this group is Valerius Simulik.

Legal framework: 38 documents were signed between Azerbaijan and Lithuania.

== High-level visits ==
=== Heads of states ===
1. October 13, 2005 – working visit of the President of Lithuania V. Adamkus to Azerbaijan.
2. June 8–9, 2006 – official visit of the President of Lithuania V. Adamkus to Azerbaijan.
3. June 19–21, 2007 – working visit of the President of Lithuania V. Adamkus to participate in the GUAM Summit.
4. September 13–14, 2007 – official visit of President of Azerbaijan Ilham Aliyev to Lithuania.
5. October 10–11, 2007 – working visit of Azerbaijani President Ilham Aliyev to Lithuania to participate in the energy Summit held in Vilnius.
6. November 13–14, 2008 – working visit of the President of Azerbaijan V. Adamkus to Azerbaijan to participate in the Energy Summit held in Baku.
7. May 2–3, 2011 – official visit of the President of Lithuania Dalia Grybauskaitė to Azerbaijan.
8. November 28–29, 2013 – working visit of Azerbaijani President Ilham Aliyev to Lithuania to participate in the Vilnius Summit.

=== Chairmen of Parliaments ===
1. June 5–7, 2005 – official visit of the Chairman of the Seimas of Lithuania A. Paulauska to Azerbaijan.
2. May 14–16, 2009 – official visit of the Chairman of the Milli Majlis of Azerbaijan O. Asadov to Lithuania.
3. February 8–11, 2011 – official visit of the Chairman of the Seimas of Lithuania I. Degutienen to Azerbaijan.
4. October 18–22, 2017 – official visit of the Deputy Chairman of the Seimas of Lithuania I. Shiauliene to Azerbaijan.

=== Prime Ministers ===
1. April 1–3, 2004 – official visit of the Prime Minister of Azerbaijan A. Rasizade to Lithuania.
2. April 21–22, 2008 – official visit of the Prime Minister of Lithuania G. Kirkilas to Azerbaijan.
3. July 5, 2011 – official visit of the Prime Minister of Lithuania A. Kubilius to Azerbaijan.
4. April 7–9, 2013 – working visit of Prime Minister of Lithuania Algirdas Butkevitsis to Azerbaijan to participate in the Global Economic Forum held in Baku.

=== Ministers ===
1. Minister of justice of Azerbaijan F. Mammadov paid a visit to Lithuania in 2001.
2. Ministers of foreign Affairs of Lithuania paid visits to Azerbaijan in 2002, 2009, 2011, 2012, 2013, 2014.
3. Azerbaijani Ministers of Defence paid visits to Lithuania in 2002, 2004, 2012, 0214, 2015.
4. Minister of Justice of Lithuania V. Makiavich paid a visit to Azerbaijan in 2002.
5. Ministers of Defence of Lithuania paid visits to Azerbaijan in 2003, 2007.
6. MFA Elmar Mammadyarov paid visits to Lithuania in 2011, 2017.

== Inter-parliamentary relations ==
The working group on inter-parliamentary relations between Azerbaijan and Lithuania was established on April 8, 2011. The group is chaired by Kamran Nabizadeh.

The Lithuania-Azerbaijan inter-parliamentary friendship group was established on October 28, 2012, and consists of 49 members. The group is chaired by Juras Pozhela.

In 2011 and 2013, Fuad Muradov, chairman of the inter-parliamentary friendship group, visited Lithuania.

== Economic cooperation ==
On April 8, 2009, a Memorandum on deepening political dialogue was signed between Azerbaijan and Lithuania. On the same day, a joint Azerbaijani-Lithuanian business forum with the participation of 20 companies was held in Baku with the financial support of the Ministry of economic development of Azerbaijan.

In February 2011, a joint Azerbaijani-Lithuanian business forum was held with the participation of 40 Lithuanian companies.

Azerbaijan invests mainly in the tourism sector of Lithuania.

In early 2013, during the 78th international exhibition and fair "Green Week", the parties signed a document on the establishment of a legal framework for the development of joint activities in the field of agriculture.

According to statistics, in 2017, the mutual trade turnover amounted to 34.8 million euros. Exports to Azerbaijan amounted to 32.6 million euros, imports from Azerbaijan-2.2 million euros.

On September 17–19, 2019, representatives of small and medium-sized businesses of the Azerbaijan Development Agency (AIDA) paid a working visit to Lithuania. Issues such as the functioning of digital structures of environmental systems, exchange of experience, training of qualified employees, etc. were discussed.

In October 2019, during the working visit of the Minister of social security and labor of Lithuania Linas Kukuraitis to Azerbaijan, an agreement on cooperation in the field of social security was signed. Prospects for cooperation in the field of children's rights protection were discussed. Joint twinning projects are being implemented.

Information and communication technologies (ICT) is also a priority area for cooperation. In April 2012, Azerbaijan and Lithuania signed an agreement on cooperation in the field of ICT. The collaboration involved building an "e-government" and using an electronic digital signature.

=== Economic agreements ===
1. On November 30, 1992, the Government of Azerbaijan and the Government of Lithuania signed an agreement on trade and economic cooperation for 1993;
2. In 2004, the Government of Azerbaijan and the Government of Lithuania signed a Convention on the avoidance of double taxation and the prevention of tax evasion on income and property in Vilnius.
3. On April 21, 2008, the Government of Azerbaijan and the Government of Lithuania signed an agreement on economic, industrial and energy cooperation in Baku.
4. On January 18, 2013, the Ministry of agriculture of Azerbaijan and the Ministry of agriculture of Lithuania signed an agreement on cooperation in the agricultural sphere in Berlin.

Currently, there are 19 Lithuanian companies operating in Azerbaijan in such areas as programming, trade, agriculture, communications, etc.

Trade turnover (in millions of US dollars)

Year	Trade turnover	Export	Import	Balance
2014	43,0	1,0	42,0	41,0
2015	68,3	31,2	37,1	5,9
2016	31,8	3,1	28,7	25,6
2017	26,2	2,3	23,9	-21,6
2018	39,6	19,5	20,1	-0,6

Azerbaijan exports to Lithuania such goods as oil, equipment, processors, fruits and vegetables, construction materials (cement), etc.

Lithuania exports mainly food, dairy products, equipment, construction materials (wood), etc. to Azerbaijan.

== Transport ==
One of the main directions of Azerbaijani-Lithuanian cooperation is transport, in particular, railway communication.

In 2016, the Azerbaijani company "Karvan Logistics" was connected to the Lithuanian project "Viking".

In April 2016, an agreement on cargo transportation between the two countries was signed between the Azerbaijani company "ADY Express" and the joint-stock company "Lithuanian Railways" in Vilnius.

== Military-technical cooperation ==
On August 28, 2002, an agreement was signed between the Defense Ministers of the two States to establish military cooperation.

== International cooperation ==
In the international arena, cooperation is carried out within the framework of various international organizations: the Council of Europe, The Organization for Security and Co-operation in Europe (OSCE), etc.

Lithuania supports Azerbaijan's position on the Nagorno-Karabakh conflict.

In February 2020, the Lithuanian Seimas adopted a document on supporting the territorial integrity of Azerbaijan.

== Cultural ties ==
In February 2011, during the business forum, an agreement was signed between the Lithuanian Business Confederation and Vilnius University with higher educational institutions of Azerbaijan.

In 2011, a bilateral agreement was signed between the Director General of the Lithuanian Business Confederation, A. Akstinas, and the President of the Azerbaijan National Confederation of Entrepreneurs, M. Musayev.

In 2011, a cooperation agreement was signed between the management of Vilnius University and the Director of the Institute of Cybernetics of the National Academy of Sciences of Azerbaijan (ANAS), T. Aliyev.

In the same year, an agreement on joint scientific work was signed between the Lithuanian company Inta and the Azerbaijani company Kiber Ltd.

The regions of Azerbaijan, Gazakh and Agstafa, are twinned with the Lithuanian districts of Trakai and Birshtonas. Shamkir and Siauliai have also the status of sister cities.

About 200 students from Azerbaijan are studying at higher educational institutions in Lithuania. One of the classrooms at Vilnius Pedagogical University is dedicated to the Azerbaijani poet and thinker Nizami Ganjavi.

One of the offices at Vilnius University is called "Azerbaijan".

Five Lithuanian scientists participated in the 2014–2016 research exchange Program in Azerbaijan.

In August 2012, a joint Azerbaijani-Lithuanian youth summer camp was launched in Baku.

In February 2018, the 100th anniversary of Gara Garayev was celebrated in Vilnius.

== The community of Azerbaijanis of Lithuania ==
In 1988, the society of Azerbaijanis in Lithuania "Odlar Yurdu" was established in Lithuania under the Lithuanian Culture Foundation. This Community contributed to the creation of the Coordinating inter-national Association of Lithuania (1988–1992).

At the initiative of the chairman of the community, a joint service of Catholics and Muslims was held in the Basilica of the Cathedral in Vilnius in January 1991, which was dedicated to the memory of those who died in January 1990 in Baku and January 1991 in Vilnius.

From 1992 to 1995, a representative Office of Azerbaijan functioned in the Lithuanian community of Azerbaijanis. October 6, 1992, chairman of the community of Azerbaijanis Mahir Gamzayev was appointed as the Plenipotentiary representative of Azerbaijan in Lithuania for the Affairs of Azerbaijanis and for the restoration of diplomatic relations between Lithuania and Azerbaijan.

In 1997, the community of Azerbaijanis in Lithuania "Odlar Yurdu" was renamed the Community of Azerbaijanis in Lithuania. The main goal of the Community is the development and preservation of the identity of Azerbaijanis living in Lithuania, their assimilation with the local population, etc.

== Resident diplomatic missions ==
- Azerbaijan has an embassy in Vilnius.
- Lithuania has an embassy in Baku.
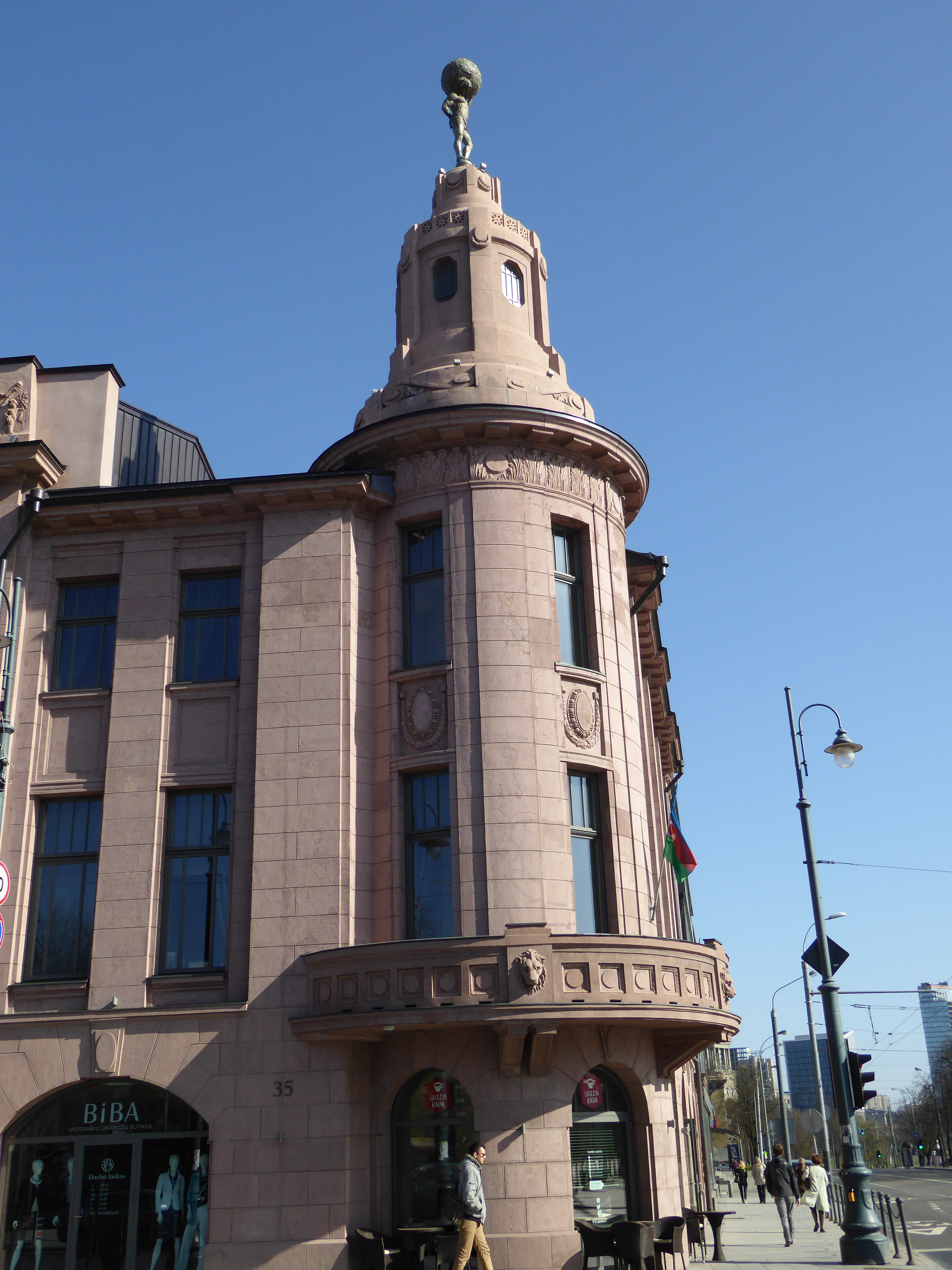
Embassy of Azerbaijan in Vilnius

== See also ==
- Foreign relations of Azerbaijan
- Foreign relations of Lithuania
- Azerbaijan-NATO relations
- Azerbaijan-EU relations
