= Azerbaijan–North Macedonia relations =

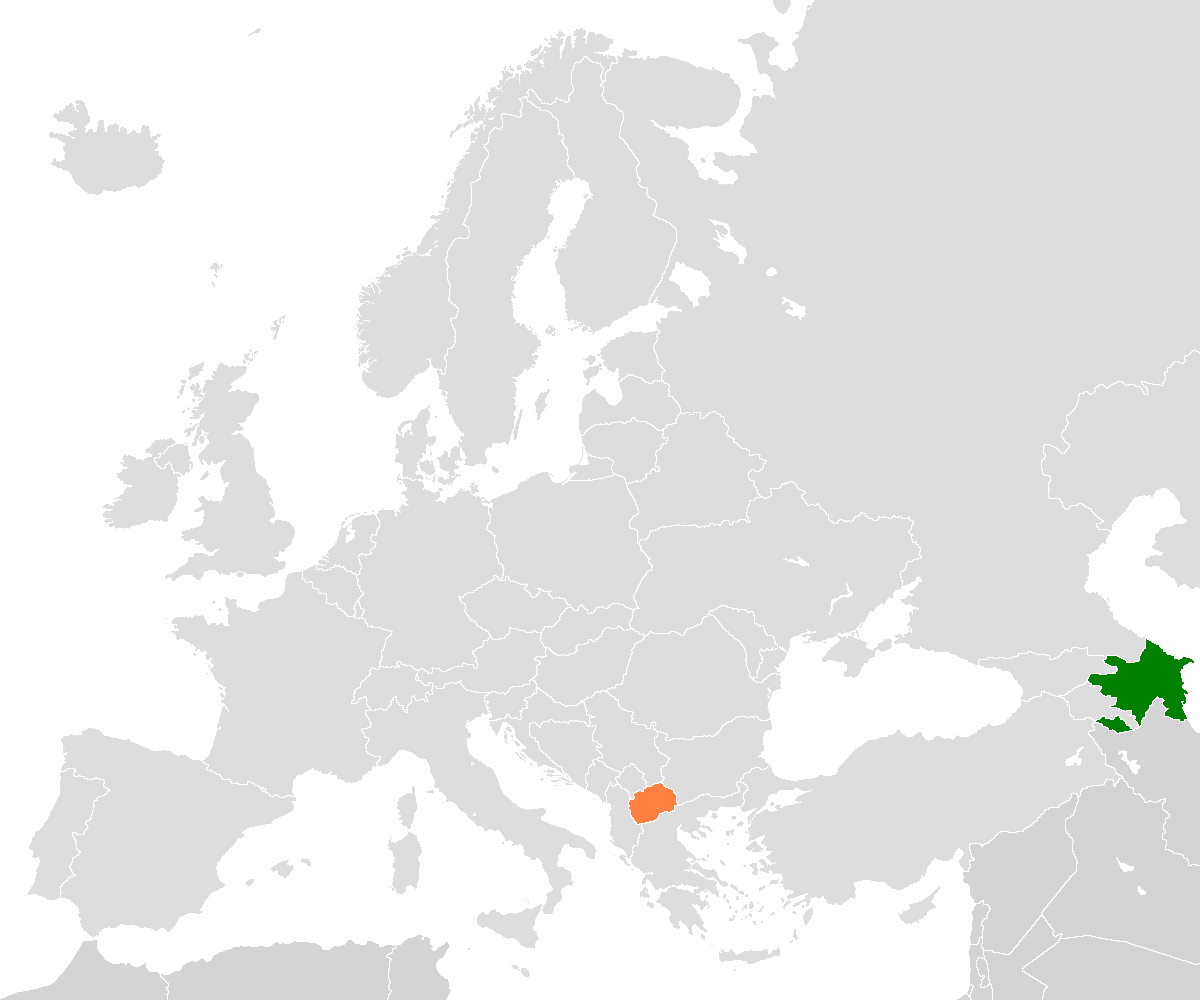

- Azerbaijan: North Macedonia

Bilateral relations exist between the Republic of Azerbaijan and the Republic of North Macedonia in the political, socio-economic, cultural and other spheres.

== Diplomatic relations ==
The government of North Macedonia recognized the independence of Azerbaijan on June 25, 1995.

Diplomatic relations between Azerbaijan and North Macedonia were established on June 28, 1995.

Since 2011, Azerbaijan's Extraordinary Ambassador to North Macedonia has been Faig Bagirov. Since 2013, The Ambassador of North Macedonia to Azerbaijan has been Goran Taskovski.

Legal framework: 5 documents have been signed between Azerbaijan and North Macedonia.

== High-level visits ==
June 28–29, 2007 – Azerbaijani Foreign Minister Elmar Mammadyarov paid a working visit to North Macedonia to participate in the Security Forum of the NATO Euro-Atlantic Partnership Council.

President of North Macedonia Gjorge Ivanov visited Azerbaijan in 2012, 2015, and 2017.

== Inter-parliamentary relations ==
There is an Azerbaijani-Macedonian inter-parliamentary working group in the Milli Majlis (Parliament) of Azerbaijan. The head of the group is Asim Mollazade.

== Economic cooperation ==
North Macedonia has an economic representative office in Azerbaijan with an office in Baku.

In September 2019, during the 74th session of the United Nations General Assembly, held in New York City, Elmar Mammadyarov met with the Prime Minister of North Macedonia Zoran Zaev. They discussed prospects of implementation of energy projects.

It is planned to connect North Macedonia to the Trans-Adriatic pipeline (TAP) to transport Azerbaijani gas from the Shah Deniz field to Europe.

Trade turnover (in thousand US dollars)

Year	Import	Export	Trade turnover	Balance
2015	774.4	-	774.4	-774.4
2016	422.7	6.3	429	-422.7
2017	963	-	963	-963
2018	837.42	27.83	865.25	-809.59

== Tourism ==
There is an agreement between the foreign ministries of the two countries on visa-free travel.

== See also ==
- Foreign relations of Azerbaijan
- Foreign relations of North Macedonia
- Azerbaijan-NATO relations
