= Azerbaijan–Estonia relations =

Bilateral relations of Azerbaijan and Estonia

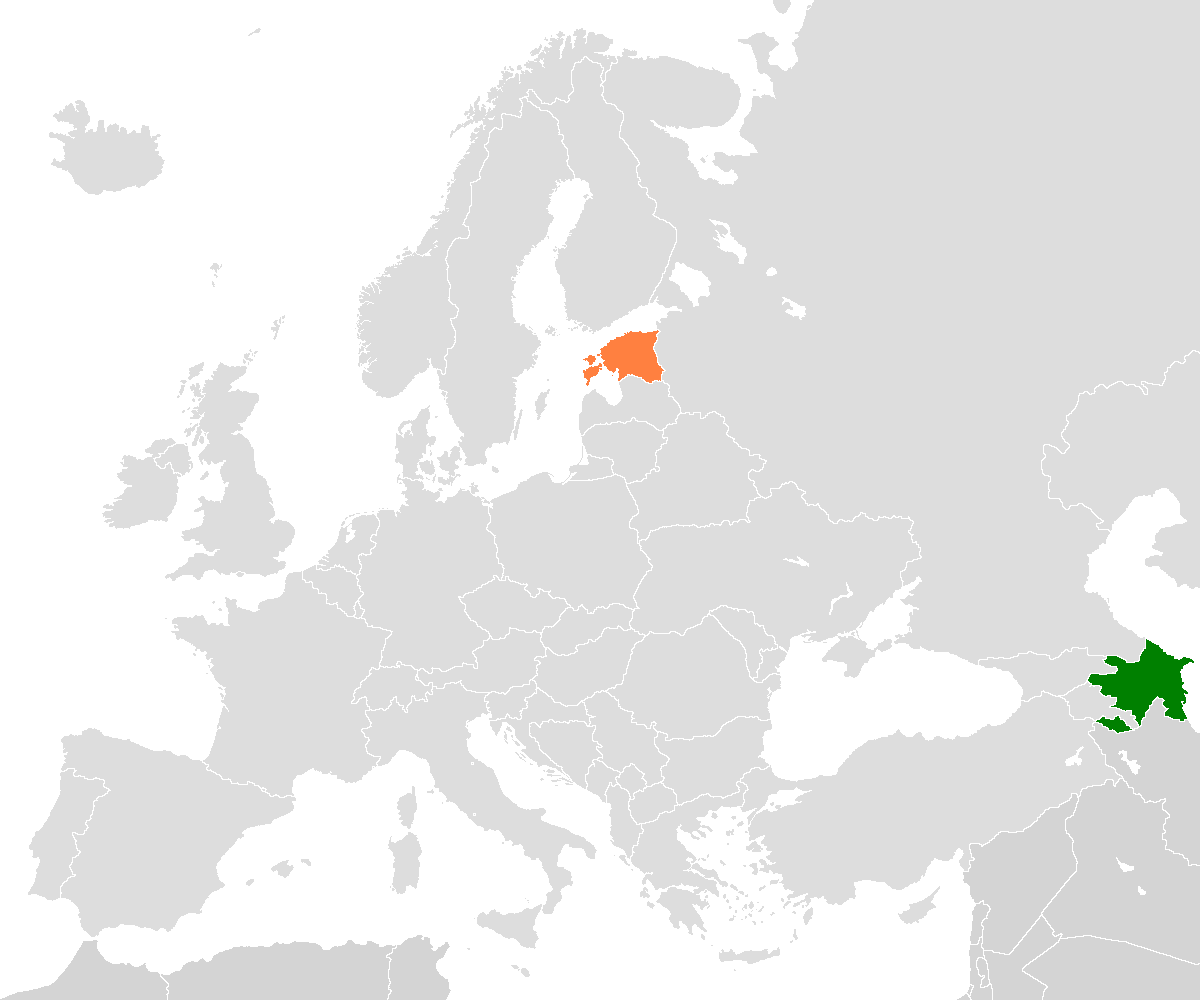

- Azerbaijan: Estonia

Foreign relations exist between Azerbaijan and Estonia. Both countries were part of the Russian Empire and the Soviet Union. Azerbaijan has an embassy in Tallinn. Estonia is represented in Azerbaijan through its embassy in Ankara (Turkey). Both countries are full members of the Council of Europe and the Organization for Security and Co-operation in Europe (OSCE). Azerbaijan, along with Georgia and Armenia, is Estonia's ally in the South Caucasus. Approximately 2,500 Azerbaijanis live in Estonia.

== Background ==
Before the dissolution of the Soviet Union, Azerbaijan participated in the union-wide referendum as the Soviet Union was being reformed into a looser federation while Estonia boycotted the referendum. The latter did not happen as a result of the coup in August 1991.

== Political relations ==
The first visit by a senior official of the Estonian government happened in 1996 when Siim Kallas, the Estonian Minister of Foreign Affairs, visited Azerbaijan and signed joint declarations. In 2000, the Azerbaijan-Estonian inter-parliamentary working group was established in the National Assembly of Azerbaijan. Estonia supported Azerbaijan in joining the Council of Europe and supports Azerbaijan's integration into Euro-Atlantic structures. President of Estonia Toomas Hendrik Ilves paid a visit to Azerbaijan in 2009 and President of Azerbaijan Ilham Aliyev visited Estonia in 2010. Estonia supports the resolution of the issues related to the Nagorno-Karabakh and the adjacent areas through negotiations.

Former Estonian Minister of Foreign Affairs Kristina Ojuland have stated that Nagorno-Karabakh is an "inseparable" part of Azerbaijan. Azerbaijan is considering cancelling the visa regime with Estonia. Estonia is also interested in the development of cooperation with Azerbaijan within NATO's peacekeeping missions. Azerbaijan is interested in developing the high-level political dialogue. Even though not many defence-related co-operation projects have taken place between the two nations, defense and military-related contacts have been described as "good and open-minded".

The Mayor of Narva (1999–2000) and Minister of Population Affairs of Estonia (2002–2003) Eldar Efendiev also had an Azerbaijani origin.

== Economic relations ==
Trade between the two countries has been minimal during the past few years, but it has tremendous potential. Both intend to expand cooperation in IT and banking.

== Cultural relations ==
Since both countries used to be part of the Russian Empire and the Soviet Union, the two nations met with each other's culture from early times. There is information from the late XIX libraries of Estonia works of about works of well-known poets of Azerbaijan such as Mirza Shafi Vazeh, Molla Panah Vagif and Mirza Fatali Akhundov which was translated into the German language. Translations into Estonian from German started in 1981 with Yukhan Kiyv, Gustav and Anna Haov Vulf. In 1978, "Scala", an Estonian newspaper published some works of Molla Panah Vagif. The first Azerbaijani-Estonian dictionary, compiled by Vidadi Mamedov, has been published.

Since 1990 an Azerbaijani Sunday school has been working in Tallinn, as well as there's an Eastern Culture University in Tallinn which was named after Azerbaijani academician and ophthalmologist Zarifa Aliyeva.

== Resident diplomatic missions ==
- Azerbaijan has an embassy in Tallinn.
- Estonia is accredited to Azerbaijan from its embassy in Ankara, Turkey and maintains an embassy office in Baku.

== See also ==
- Foreign relations of Azerbaijan
- Foreign relations of Estonia
- Azerbaijan-NATO relations
- Azerbaijan-EU relations
