= Azerbaijan–Spain relations =

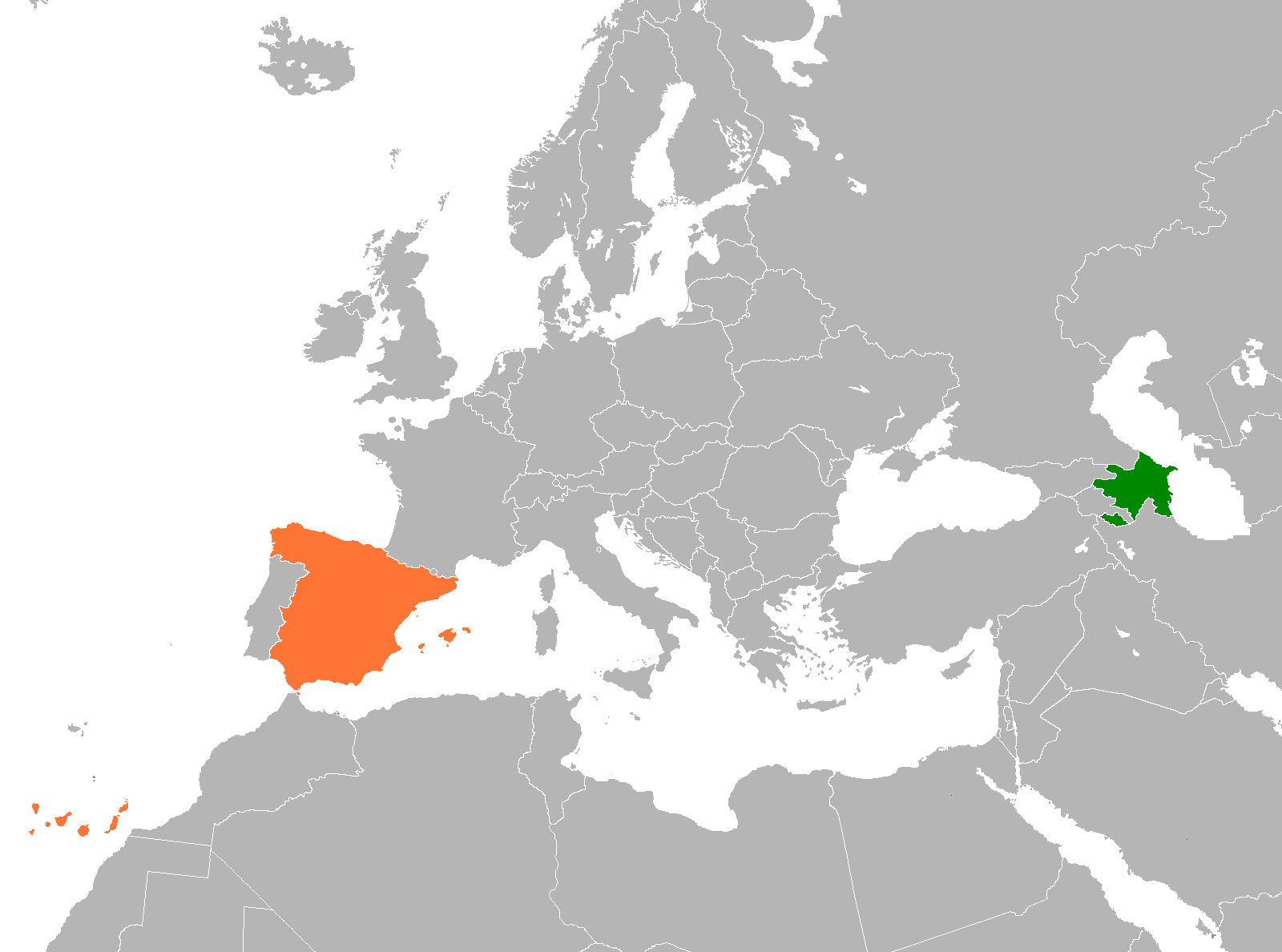

- Azerbaijan: Spain

Foreign relations have existed between the Republic of Azerbaijan and the Kingdom of Spain since 11 February 1992. Both nations are members of the Council of Europe.

== History ==
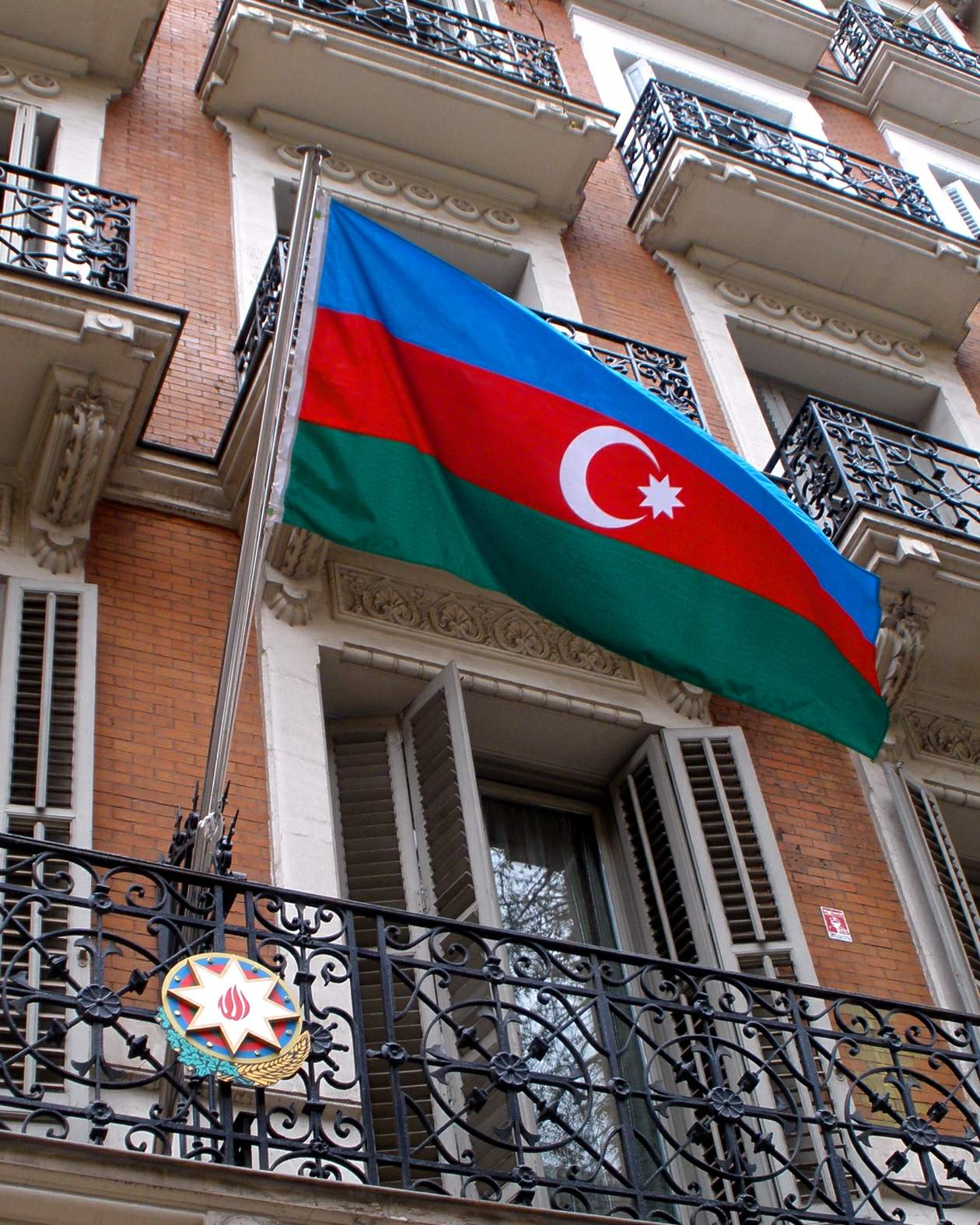
Embassy of Azerbaijan in Madrid

Spain has had diplomatic relations with the Republic of Azerbaijan since February 11, 1992, shortly after its independence after the breakup of the Soviet Union.

On July 8, 1997 President Heydar Aliyev and Foreign Minister Hasan Hasanov attended a NATO summit held in Madrid.

In 2003, trade between Spain and Azerbaijan totaled $US 264.3 million during January–June 2003. This included $241.3 million worth of Azerbaijani exports to Spain of crude oil. $23 million worth of goods and services were imported from Spain. The Spanish company Repsoil is involved in oil exploration in Azerbaijan.

In the end of 2005, Azerbaijan opened an embassy in Madrid.

As of 2005, there were two pending bilateral agreements between Azerbaijan awaiting signature: the Bilateral Agreement on the Promotion and Reciprocal Protection of Investments and the Convention on the Avoidance of Double Taxation.

In 2006 Spanish diplomats met in Baku with representatives of the President's Office, Foreign Ministry, and meet opposition leaders. The delegation also met ambassadors of OSCE member states that are accredited in Baku.

On 11 October 2024, the next round of political consultations between the Ministries of Foreign Affairs of Azerbaijan and Spain was held in Madrid. Azerbaijani delegation was led by Fariz Rzayev, Deputy Minister of Foreign Affairs, and the Spanish delegation was led by Diego Belio Martinez, Secretary of State for Foreign and Global Affairs. The current situation and development prospects of relations between Azerbaijan and Spain in the political, economic and humanitarian spheres were discussed. The importance of continuous political dialogue and the importance of holding high-level talks and visits in this regard was emphasized. Issues of mutual interest on the international agenda, such as continuation of cooperation in multilateral formats, were in the focus of the consultations. The counterpart was informed about the preparations for the session of the 29th Conference of the Parties of the United Nations Framework Convention on Climate Change (COP29) to be held in Azerbaijan in November 2024 and the work underway.

On 19 May 2025, Speaker Sahiba Gafarova met Spain's Senate Speaker Pedro Rollán in Madrid. Discussions emphasized inter‑parliamentary cooperation, economic ties, energy projects, cultural exchange, and Spain's support during Azerbaijan's COP29 chairing.

== Economic, trade and investment relations ==
=== Strategic economic agreements ===
On 11 March 2025, it was announced that Azerbaijan and Spain are set to sign a Memorandum of Understanding (MoU) on cooperation aimed at bolstering their economic relations, Azerbaijan's Deputy Minister of Economy Elnur Aliyev said. The agreement is set to be signed in Baku. It is estimated that trade volume between the two nations reached approximately $300 million in 2024.

=== Foreign direct investment ===
- Spain invested over $7 million into Azerbaijan in 2024 (up from $1.17 million in 2023).
- Azerbaijan's investment into Spain reached around $53.7 million in 2024, roughly 2.2× the 2023 amount.

=== EU framework alignment ===
Through Spain, an EU member, Azerbaijan engages on energy partnerships (e.g., EU gas imports), participates in the Eastern Partnership, and collaborates on climate (COP29) and regional security dialogues.

== Cultural, educational and parliamentary ties ==
=== Cultural and educational exchange ===
Since 2008, the Azerbaijan University of Languages hosts a MAEC‑AECID Spanish lector and a Spanish cultural center, supported by scholarships and DELE exams.

There was a Joint sports education MoU signed in 2010 and regular cultural programming via embassy cooperation.

=== Nagorno‑Karabakh stance ===
Historically, Spain backed UN resolutions condemning Armenian occupation in the 1990s. More recently, criticism emerged from Spanish MPs regarding Azerbaijan's military actions in Nagorno-Karabakh, as well as the destruction of Armenian cultural and historical heritages. On October 17, 2023, the Spanish Senate adopted an official declaration condemning the military operation carried out by Azerbaijan authorities “against the Armenian population of Nagorno-Karabakh that has led to the death of hundreds of Armenians and the mass exodus of thousands of people”.

== Resident diplomatic missions ==
- Azerbaijan has an embassy in Madrid.
- Spain is accredited to Azerbaijan from its embassy in Ankara, Turkey.

== See also ==
- Foreign relations of Azerbaijan
- Foreign relations of Spain
- Azerbaijan-NATO relations
- Azerbaijan-EU relations
