= Azerbaijan–Sweden relations =

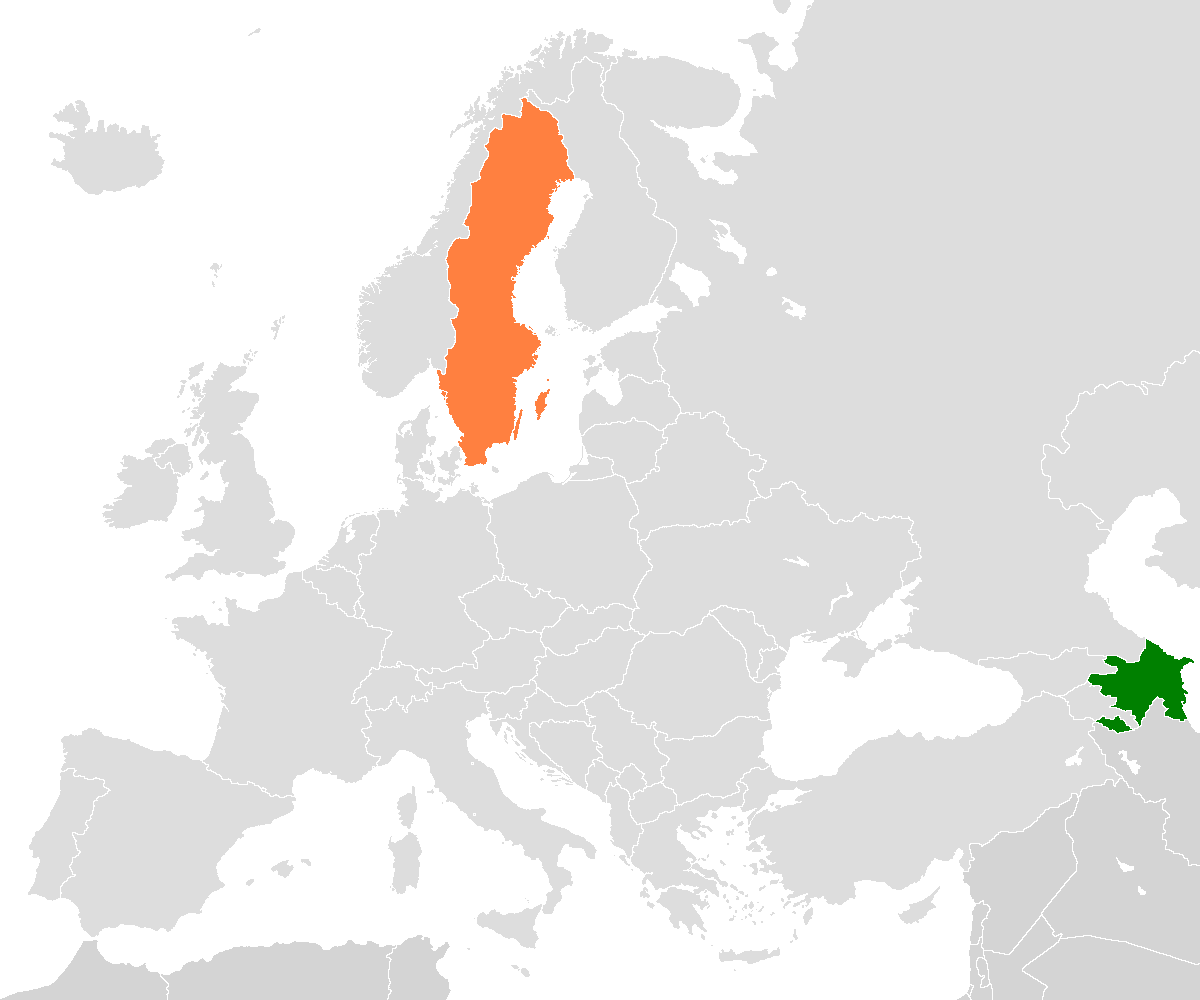

- Azerbaijan: Sweden

Azerbaijan–Sweden relations are the bilateral relations between Azerbaijan and Sweden. Azerbaijan has an embassy in Stockholm. Sweden has an embassy in Baku. Both countries are full members of the Council of Europe and Organization for Security and Co-operation in Europe.

== Diplomatic relations ==
Sweden recognized the independence of Azerbaijan on 16 January 1992. Diplomatic relations between the two countries were established on 8 May 1992.

A working group on relations with Sweden operates in the Parliament of Azerbaijan. The head of the group is Kamila Aliyeva.

On 30 September 2016, the two countries signed an agreement on the avoidance of double taxation.

At the international level, cooperation between the two countries is carried out within the framework of various international organizations, including the Council of Europe and the Organization for Security and Co-operation in Europe (OSCE).

== High level visits ==
On 9–10 February 2016, the Minister for Foreign Affairs of Sweden, Margot Wallström, paid an official visit to Azerbaijan.

On 6–7 November 2017, the Minister of Foreign Affairs of Azerbaijan, Elmar Mammadyarov, paid an official visit to Sweden.

On 4–6 November 2019, Mammadyarov visited Sweden to participate in an event dedicated to the 10th anniversary of the Eastern Partnership programme.

== Cultural relations ==
Various cultural events are organized in Sweden by the Congress of Azerbaijanis of Sweden, the Sweden–Azerbaijan Cultural Association, and other organizations, including celebrations of Novruz and Azerbaijan's Independence Day, concerts, as well as seminars at institutes of international policy.

Schools operate in Stockholm and other cities where children are taught the Azerbaijani language.

In June 2010, Azerbaijanis living in Sweden launched a television channel called ArazTV. The channel broadcasts twice a week in three languages, Azerbaijani, Swedish, and English.

Plans have been announced to establish a children's Azerbaijani theater under the direction of Azerbaijani director Sevinj Nazarli.

In January 2024, an Anthology of Swedish Prose was published in the Azerbaijani language. The collection includes works by Stieg Larsson, Pär Lagerkvist, Selma Lagerlöf, Eyvind Johnson, Astrid Lindgren, August Strindberg, and other Swedish writers.

== See also ==
- Foreign relations of Azerbaijan
- Foreign relations of Sweden
- Azerbaijan-NATO relations
- Azerbaijan-EU relations
