= Khanhuseyn Kazimli =

Azerbaijani politician (1942–2025)

- Xanhüseyn Kazımlı
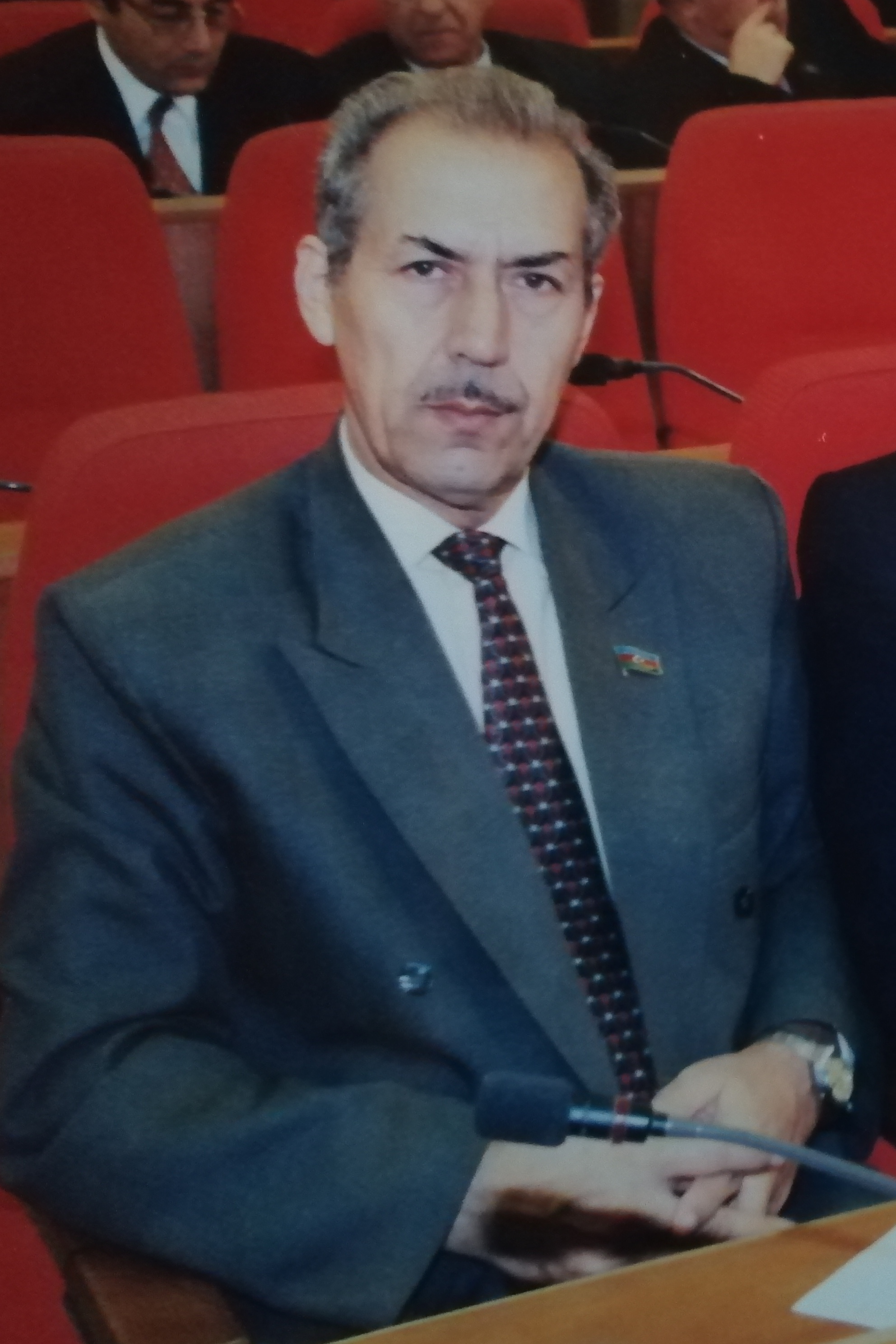

Personal details
- Born: 1 October 1942; Ağaməmmədli, Azerbaijan SSR, USSR
- Died: 24 July 2025 (aged 82)
- Citizenship: Azerbaijan

Khanhuseyn Kazimli (Azerbaijani: Xanhüseyn Hüseynağa oğlu Kazımlı; 1 October 1942 – 24 July 2025) was an Azerbaijani politician who was a Member of Parliament (Milli Məclis), and the head of the working group on Azerbaijan-Hungary inter-parliamentary relations, which was established on 8 April 2011.

Kazimli, who had been suffering from Parkinson's disease for a long time, died on 24 July 2025, at the age of 82. He was buried at Yasamal cemetery.
