= Vasile Soare =

Romanian diplomat (born 1957)

Romanian Ambassador to Azerbaijan
- Incumbent
- Assumed office 2021

Personal details
- Born: October 5, 1957 (age 68) Buciumeni, Romania
- Education: Diplomatic Institute of Romania
- Profession: Diplomat

Vasile Soare is a Romanian diplomat. Ambassador Extraordinary and Plenipotentiary of Romania to Azerbaijan since October 28, 2021.

== Biography ==
On 7 February 2002, Extraordinary and Plenipotentiary ambassador of Romania to Kazakhstan Vasile Soare presented credentials to President Nursultan Nazarbayev. Vasile Soare has studied about the Soviet deportations from Bessarabia and Northern Bukovina.

Also, on 9 September 2003, a memorial monument was unveiled in the Spassk village in the memory of the Romanian World War II prisoners who had been buried in the Karlag memorial cemetery. With the help of the local authorities Vasile Soare discovered that 6,740 Romanian captives were kept in the Karaganda region prisons between 1941 and 1946. 827 of them were buried in the Spassk cemetery.

Ambassador Extraordinary and Plenipotentiary of Romania to Kyrgyzstan and Tajikistan (2003 — January 2008)

Ambassador Extraordinary and Plenipotentiary of Romania to Russia (2014 — 2020)

Ambassador Extraordinary and Plenipotentiary of Romania to Azerbaijan (since October 28, 2021).

== See also ==
- Soviet deportations from Bessarabia and Northern Bukovina
