= Argentina–Azerbaijan relations =

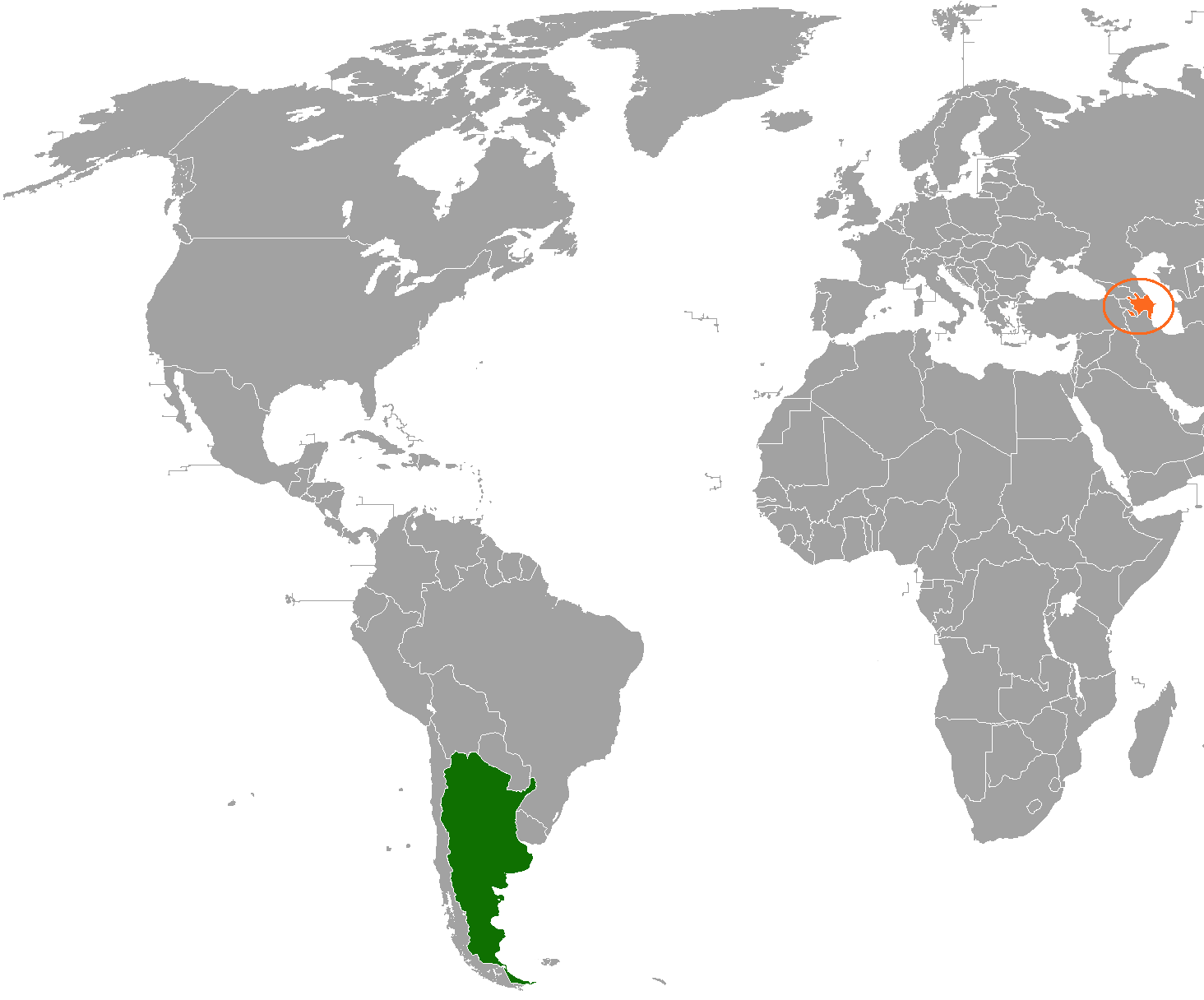

- Argentina: Azerbaijan

Current and historical relations between Argentina and Azerbaijan have existed for decades, since Argentina's recognition of Azerbaijan on 9 March 1992.

== History ==
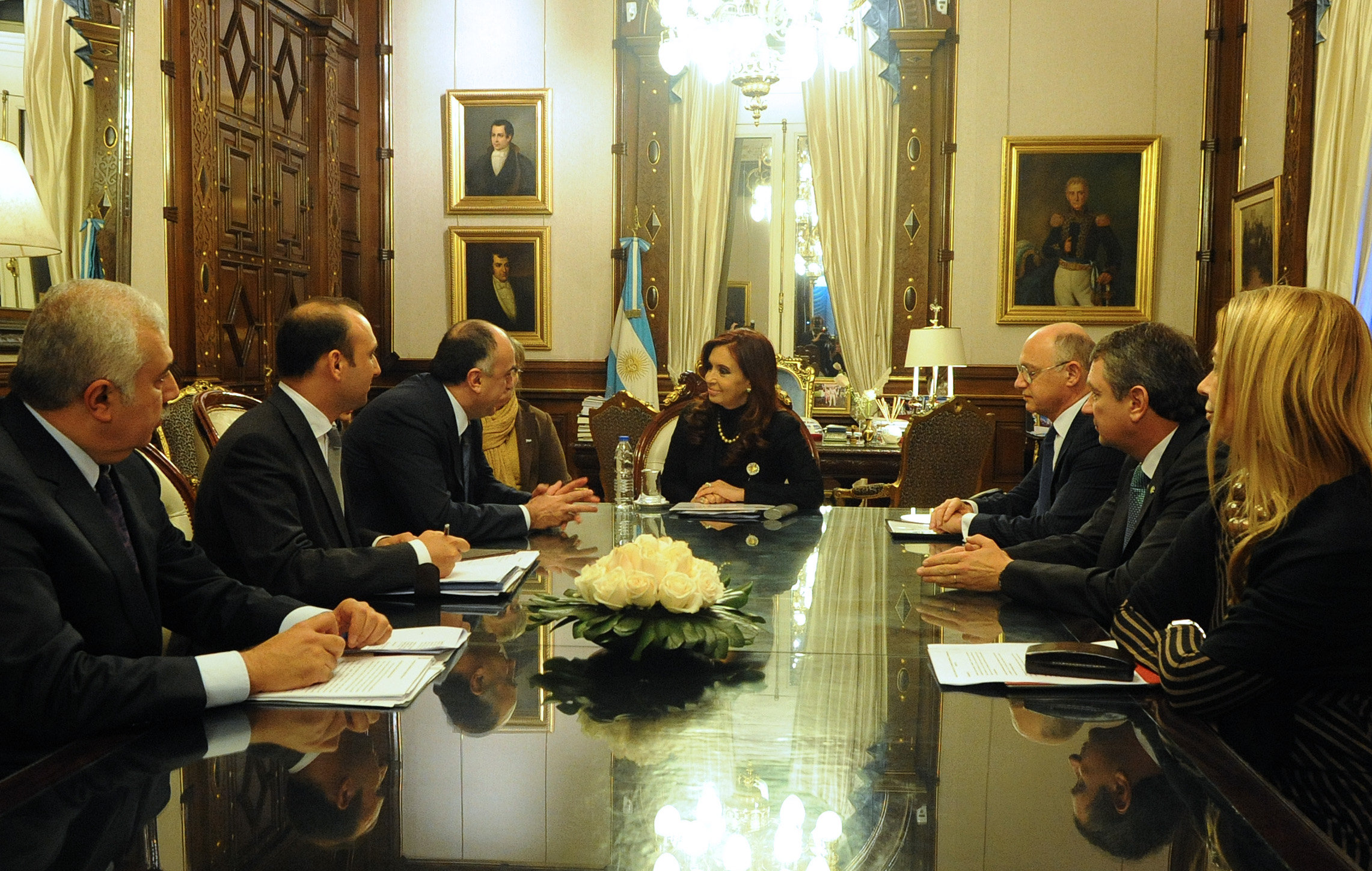
Argentine President Cristina Fernández de Kirchner meeting with Azerbaijani Foreign Minister Elmar Mammadyarov in Buenos Aires

On 25 December 1991, Azerbaijan gained independence after the Dissolution of the Soviet Union. On 9 March 1992, Argentina recognized the independence of Azerbaijan and on 8 November 1992 both nations established diplomatic relations. In April 2006, Azerbaijani Foreign Minister Elmar Mammadyarov paid a visit to Argentina.

In October 2010, Azerbaijan opened an embassy in Buenos Aires, its first in South America.

From 16 to 20 October 2011, President of the National Center for Scientific and Technical Studies of Argentina (CONICET) Marta Rovira paid a visit to Azerbaijan. During the visit meetings were held with President of the National Academy of Sciences of Azerbaijan Mahmud Karimov, Education Minister Misir Mardanov, Deputy Minister of Communications and Information Technologies Elmir Velizade and rector of Baku State University Abel Maharramov. They also signed an agreement on cooperation between ANAS and CONICET.

On 2 November 2011, Azerbaijan and Argentina signed a memorandum of understanding on the innovation, technological research and science. The agreement was signed in Baku between the Ministry of Economic Development of Azerbaijan and the Ministry of Science, Technology and Productive Innovation of Argentina. The agreement was signed by Minister Shahin Mustafayev on the Azerbaijani side and Minister Lino Baranjao on the Argentinean side.

In September 2011, a delegation of Argentine legislators paid a visit to Azerbaijan to celebrate the 20th anniversary of Azerbaijan's independence. In 2012, Argentina opened an embassy in Baku. On 18 February 2012, by the decree of President of the Argentine Republic, Christine Fernandez de Kirchner, Carlos Dante Riva was appointed as an ambassador to the Republic of Azerbaijan. In March 2012, Argentine Foreign Minister, Héctor Timerman paid a visit to Azerbaijan and met with Azerbaijani President Ilham Aliyev. In July 2012, Azerbaijani Foreign Minister Elmar Mammadyarov paid a second visit to Argentina.

Azerbaijan and Argentina signed an agreement on cooperation on the peaceful uses of outer space. Also, the Argentinean company Invap S.E. offered cooperation in the space industry to the Azerbaijani OJSC “Azercosmos”. Preliminary negotiations on cooperation between the management of Invap S.E. and OJSC "Azerkosmos" was held in 2013.

In 2014, the legislative council of Buenos Aires decided to discard a draft project to name a square in the city as Republic of Azerbaijan. The bill drew a lot of criticism within the Armenian community in Argentina, as relations in the Caucasus "were overshadowed by the Nagorno-Karabakh War with neighboring Armenia."

On 21 April 2014, a meeting was held between the Minister of Economy and Industry Shahin Mustafayev and Argentine Ambassador Carlos Dante Rivoi.

On 23 September 2015, Azerbaijan and Argentina signed an agreement on technical cooperation. The document was signed by Minister of Economy and Industry of Azerbaijan Shahin Mustafayev and Deputy Minister of Foreign Affairs, International Trade and Worship of Argentina Eduardo Zuain, who paid a visit to Baku.

Carlos Foradori, Deputy Minister for Foreign Affairs and Worship of Argentina, visited Baku to attend the 7th Global Forum of the UN Alliance of Civilizations (UNCTAD) held in Baku in April 2016.

In September 2016, the delegation led by the Second Vice-President of the Chamber of Deputies of Argentina, Patricia Jimenez, paid a visit to Azerbaijan to attend the 5th International Humanitarian Forum in Baku. The delegation was received by the President of the Republic of Azerbaijan Mr. Ilham Aliyev and the First Lady, Mrs Mehriban Aliyeva. The delegation also met with the Foreign Minister Elmar Mammadyarov and the Vice-Speaker of the AR Milli Majlis Bahar Muradova.

== Trade and bilateral relations ==
The Special Commission on the drafting of agreements on trade and economic cooperation and on reciprocal investment promotion and protection between Azerbaijan and Argentina was established in 2012. On 3 July 2012, the first Azerbaijan-Argentine Business Forum commenced its work in Baku. About 200 businessmen from Argentina, representing different spheres of the economy, and more than 200 entrepreneurs from Azerbaijan took part in the proceedings of the Forum.

In 2015, total trade between Argentina and Azerbaijan totaled US$10.6 million. Argentina's main exports to Azerbaijan is wine and pharmaceutical products. Azerbaijan main export to Argentina is oil. In 2014, both nations agreed to boost technical cooperation and to expand a mutual co-op in the space industry.

== Cultural ties ==
On 3 May 2011, the first issue of the magazine "İRS Herencia", the Spanish version of the Azerbaijani international journal "IRS-Heritage", was presented at the international book exhibition in Buenos Aires. It is the first magazine written in Spanish about Azerbaijan. The magazine provides information on Azerbaijani history, culture and traditions. The first issue of the magazine, which was entitled as "Azerbaijan is the land of magic voices", was dedicated to the musical heritage of Azerbaijan.

In November 2010, the Azerbaijan Diplomatic Academy (ADA) and the Institute of the Diplomatic Service of Argentina signed a memorandum of understanding. The document was signed by Rector of the Azerbaijan Diplomatic Academy Hafiz Pashayev and Deputy Minister of Foreign Affairs, International Trade and Worship of Argentina Alberto Pedro D'Alotto.

A week of political, social and cultural events about Azerbaijan was held in Buenos Aires at the end of 2011 to mark the 20th anniversary of the restoration of Azerbaijan's Independence. Within the framework of the week, there was held the ceremony for creation of the fund of publishers about Azerbaijan in the National Library of the Republic of Argentina, which is considered to be one of the largest scientific centers in Latin America.

From 4 to 7 October 2017, Baku hosted the First International Tango Festival. The festival was organized by the Embassy of Argentina in Azerbaijan and the dance studios existing in Baku.

At present, extensive activities are taken to organize the Days of Azerbaijani Culture in Argentina, and therefore the Embassy receives the support from the Ministry of Culture and Tourism of Azerbaijan.

== Modern relations ==
At present, active work is being conducted to create an appropriate legal and regulatory framework for the development of relations between Azerbaijan and Argentina.

Also, the National Nuclear Research Center of the Ministry of Communications and High Technologies of Azerbaijan is negotiating cooperation with the Argentine company INVAP S.E. in the construction of nuclear reactors.

== Resident diplomatic missions ==
- Argentina has an embassy in Baku.
- Azerbaijan has an embassy in Buenos Aires.

== See also ==
- Foreign relations of Argentina
- Foreign relations of Azerbaijan
