= Foreign relations of Azerbaijan =

The Republic of Azerbaijan is a member of the United Nations, the Non-Aligned Movement, the Organization for Security and Cooperation in Europe, NATO's Partnership for Peace, the Euro-Atlantic Partnership Council, the World Health Organization, the European Bank for Reconstruction and Development; the Council of Europe, CFE Treaty, the Community of Democracies; the International Monetary Fund; and the World Bank.

== List ==
List of countries which Azerbaijan maintains diplomatic relations with:

#	Country	Date
1	Turkey	14 January 1992
2	Liechtenstein	21 January 1992
3	Switzerland	21 January 1992
4	North Korea	30 January 1992
5	Ukraine	6 February 1992
6	Mexico	10 February 1992
7	Spain	11 February 1992
8	Austria	20 February 1992
9	Germany	20 February 1992
10	France	21 February 1992
11	Poland	21 February 1992
12	Saudi Arabia	24 February 1992
13	Yemen	25 February 1992
14	Bangladesh	26 February 1992
15	India	28 February 1992
16	United States	28 February 1992
17	Guinea	11 March 1992
18	Nigeria	11 March 1992
19	United Kingdom	11 March 1992
20	Iran	12 March 1992
21	Libya	16 March 1992
22	South Korea	23 March 1992
23	Finland	24 March 1992
24	Cuba	27 March 1992
25	Egypt	27 March 1992
26	Philippines	27 March 1992
27	Syria	28 March 1992
28	Iraq	30 March 1992
29	Netherlands	1 April 1992
30	China	2 April 1992
31	Denmark	2 April 1992
32	Greece	2 April 1992
33	Russia	4 April 1992
34	Israel	7 April 1992
—	State of Palestine	15 April 1992
35	Mongolia	16 April 1992
36	Estonia	20 April 1992
37	Hungary	27 April 1992
38	South Africa	29 April 1992
39	Sweden	8 May 1992
40	Italy	8 May 1992
—	Holy See	23 May 1992
41	Moldova	29 May 1992
42	Tajikistan	29 May 1992
43	Luxembourg	1 June 1992
44	Bulgaria	5 June 1992
45	Norway	5 June 1992
46	Pakistan	9 June 1992
47	Turkmenistan	9 June 1992
48	Belgium	17 June 1992
49	Australia	19 June 1992
50	Romania	19 June 1992
51	New Zealand	29 June 1992
52	Thailand	7 July 1992
53	Canada	10 July 1992
54	Oman	13 July 1992
55	Sudan	25 July 1992
56	Portugal	4 August 1992
57	Sri Lanka	4 August 1992
58	Lebanon	18 September 1992
59	Guinea-Bissau	27 August 1992
60	Morocco	28 August 1992
61	Kazakhstan	30 August 1992
62	United Arab Emirates	1 September 1992
63	Japan	7 September 1992
64	Ghana	11 September 1992
65	Vietnam	23 September 1992
66	Indonesia	24 September 1992
67	Ethiopia	2 November 1992
68	Georgia	18 November 1992
69	Kyrgyzstan	19 January 1993
70	Czech Republic	29 January 1993
71	Jordan	13 February 1993
72	Malaysia	5 April 1993
73	Madagascar	26 May 1993
74	Belarus	11 June 1993
75	Albania	23 September 1993
76	Brazil	21 October 1993
77	Argentina	8 November 1993
78	Zambia	18 November 1993
79	Slovakia	23 November 1993
80	Latvia	11 January 1994
81	Algeria	22 April 1994
82	Singapore	15 August 1994
83	Qatar	14 September 1994
84	Kuwait	7 October 1994
85	Mauritania	29 October 1994
86	Guatemala	1 November 1994
87	Seychelles	2 November 1994
88	Chile	3 November 1994
89	Gambia	11 November 1994
90	Afghanistan	16 November 1994
91	Nicaragua	23 November 1994
92	Angola	1 December 1994
93	Colombia	13 December 1994
94	Honduras	22 December 1994
95	Cambodia	28 December 1994
96	Malta	9 January 1995
97	Uruguay	11 January 1995
98	Croatia	26 January 1995
99	Bosnia and Herzegovina	9 February 1995
100	Guyana	9 January 1995
101	Cameroon	24 February 1995
102	Nepal	28 February 1995
103	Burundi	2 March 1995
104	Sierra Leone	13 March 1995
105	Saint Kitts and Nevis	22 March 1995
106	Antigua and Barbuda	5 April 1995
107	Panama	6 April 1995
108	Venezuela	12 May 1995
109	Laos	22 May 1995
110	Mozambique	20 June 1995
111	North Macedonia	28 June 1995
112	Uganda	19 August 1995
113	Uzbekistan	2 October 1995
114	Niger	10 October 1995
115	Lithuania	20 November 1995
116	Jamaica	22 November 1995
117	Brunei	24 November 1995
118	Slovenia	20 February 1996
119	Senegal	14 March 1996
120	Andorra	30 April 1996
121	Liberia	22 May 1996
122	Peru	25 June 1996
123	Ireland	1 July 1996
124	Bolivia	8 July 1996
125	Mauritius	19 July 1996
126	Gabon	1 October 1996
127	Djibouti	22 October 1996
128	Bahrain	6 November 1996
129	Ivory Coast	19 November 1996
130	Mali	26 November 1996
131	Costa Rica	15 January 1997
132	Serbia	21 August 1997
133	Iceland	27 February 1998
134	Tunisia	1 July 1998
135	El Salvador	23 March 1999
136	Myanmar	3 August 1999
137	Benin	14 October 1999
138	Suriname	11 February 2000
139	San Marino	19 April 2002
140	Belize	24 June 2002
141	Haiti	9 May 2003
142	Saint Vincent and the Grenadines	23 May 2003
143	Cape Verde	22 March 2004
144	Ecuador	22 March 2004
145	Somalia	22 March 2004
146	Chad	5 April 2004
147	Timor-Leste	5 April 2004
148	Eritrea	20 April 2004
149	Paraguay	20 April 2004
150	Malawi	21 May 2004
151	Burkina Faso	28 May 2004
152	Kenya	28 May 2004
153	Rwanda	28 May 2004
154	Equatorial Guinea	11 November 2004
155	Nauru	11 November 2004
156	Maldives	15 June 2006
157	Dominican Republic	12 November 2007
158	Monaco	19 December 2007
159	Montenegro	24 April 2008
160	Zimbabwe	24 October 2008
161	Tuvalu	9 September 2009
162	Comoros	1 January 2010
163	Eswatini	7 January 2010
164	Marshall Islands	10 March 2010
165	Saint Lucia	11 March 2010
166	Fiji	18 March 2010
167	Grenada	23 September 2010
168	Togo	28 December 2010
169	Solomon Islands	8 February 2011
170	Dominica	4 March 2011
171	Trinidad and Tobago	11 April 2011
172	Democratic Republic of the Congo	23 September 2011
173	Lesotho	28 September 2012
174	South Sudan	23 October 2012
175	Bhutan	7 February 2013
176	Bahamas	2 May 2017
177	Vanuatu	22 September 2017
178	Samoa	19 January 2018
179	Palau	1 February 2018
180	Republic of the Congo	19 March 2018
181	São Tomé and Príncipe	25 September 2018
182	Tanzania	7 February 2019
183	Barbados	2 August 2019
184	Namibia	17 October 2019
185	Papua New Guinea	5 May 2023
—	Cook Islands	7 April 2025
186	Botswana	11 November 2025
187	Federated States of Micronesia	1 June 2026
188	Central African Republic	23 September 2026

== Information on some of the countries with which Azerbaijan maintains formal relations ==
=== Multilateral ===
Organization	Formal Relations Began	Notes
Council of Europe		See Azerbaijan in the Council of Europe
European Union	27 February 1992	See Azerbaijan–European Union relations
NATO	1992	See Azerbaijan–NATO relations
Turkic States	2009	See Azerbaijan–Turkic Council relations

=== Africa ===
Country	Formal Relations Began	Notes
Burkina Faso	28 May 2004	See Azerbaijan–Burkina Faso relations
Democratic Republic of the Congo	23 September 2011	See Azerbaijan–DR Congo relations
Djibouti	22 October 1996	See Azerbaijan–Djibouti relations
Ethiopia	2 November 1992	See Azerbaijan–Ethiopia relations
Gambia	11 November 1994	See Azerbaijan–the Gambia relations
Kenya	28 May 2004	See Azerbaijan–Kenya relations
Libya	16 March 1992	See Azerbaijan–Libya relations
Morocco	28 August 1992	See Azerbaijan–Morocco relations
Senegal	14 March 1996	See Azerbaijan–Senegal relations
South Africa	29 April 1992	See Azerbaijan–South Africa relations

=== Americas ===
Country	Formal Relations Began	Notes
Argentina	8 November 1993	See Argentina–Azerbaijan relations: Argentina has an embassy in Baku.; Azerbaijan has an embassy in Buenos Aires.
Brazil	21 October 1993	See Azerbaijan–Brazil relations: Azerbaijan has an embassy in Brasília.; Brazil has an embassy in Baku.
Canada	10 July 1992	See Azerbaijan–Canada relations: Azerbaijan has an embassy in Ottawa.; Canada is accredited to Azerbaijan from its embassy in Ankara, Turkey.
Colombia	12 December 1994	See Azerbaijan–Colombia relations: Azerbaijan has an embassy in Bogotá.; Colombia has an embassy in Baku.
Cuba	27 March 1992	See Azerbaijan–Cuba relations
Ecuador	22 March 2004	See Azerbaijan–Ecuador relations
Mexico	10 February 1992	See Azerbaijan–Mexico relations: Azerbaijan has an embassy in Mexico City.; Mexico has an embassy in Baku.
Nicaragua	23 November 1994	See Azerbaijan–Nicaragua relations: Nicaragua is represented in Azerbaijan through its embassy in Moscow, Russia.
Paraguay	20 April 2004	See Azerbaijan–Paraguay relations
Peru	25 June 1996	See Azerbaijan–Peru relations: Peru has an embassy in Baku.
United States	28 February 1992	See Azerbaijan–United States relations On 25 December 1991 President George H. W. Bush announced that the United States recognized the independence of all 12 former Soviet republics, including Azerbaijan.: Azerbaijan has an embassy in Washington, D.C., and a consulate-general in Los Angeles.; United States has an embassy in Baku.
Uruguay	11 January 1995	See Azerbaijan–Uruguay relations
Venezuela	12 May 1995	See Azerbaijan–Venezuela relations

=== Asia ===
Country	Formal Relations Began	Notes
Armenia		See Armenia–Azerbaijan relations, First Nagorno-Karabakh War, Second Nagorno-Karabakh war The neighboring nations of Armenia and Azerbaijan have had formal governmental relations between 1918 and 1921, when both countries were briefly independent. The two nations have fought three wars in the 1918–20 (Armenian–Azerbaijani War), the 1988–94 (Nagorno-Karabakh War), and the 2020 Nagorno-Karabakh war, with the last two ending in ceasefire agreements - the Bishkek Protocol and the 2020 Nagorno-Karabakh ceasefire agreement respectively. There are no formal diplomatic relations between the two countries, because of the ongoing Nagorno-Karabakh conflict and dispute. In 2008, Azerbaijani president Ilham Aliyev declared, "Nagorno Karabakh will never be independent; the position is backed by international mediators as well; Armenia has to accept the reality," and "in 1918, Yerevan was granted to the Armenians. It was a great mistake. The khanate of Iravan was the Azerbaijani territory, the Armenians were guests here." During the Soviet period, many Armenians and Azerbaijanis lived side by side in peace. However, when Mikhail Gorbachev introduced the policies of Glasnost and Perestroika, the majority of Armenians from the Nagorno-Karabakh Autonomous Oblast (NKAO) of the Azerbaijan SSR began a movement to unify with the Armenian SSR. In 1988, the Armenians of Karabakh voted to secede and join Armenia. This, along with mutual massacres in Azerbaijan and Armenia resulted in the conflict that became known as the Nagorno-Karabakh War. The violence resulted in de facto Armenian control of former NKAO and seven surrounding Azerbaijani regions, which was effectively halted when both sides agreed to observe a cease-fire, which has since been in effect since May 1994, and in late 1995 both also agreed to mediation of the OSCE Minsk Group. The Minsk Group is currently co-chaired by the U.S., France, and Russia and comprises Armenia, Azerbaijan, Turkey, and several Western European nations. Despite the cease fire, up to 40 clashes are reported along the Nagorno-Karabakh conflict lines of control each year. The two countries are still technically at war. Citizens of the Republic of Armenia, as well as citizens of any other country who are of Armenian descent, are forbidden entry to the Republic of Azerbaijan. If a person's passport shows any evidence of travel to Nagorno-Karabakh, they are forbidden entry to the Republic of Azerbaijan. In 2008, in what became known as the 2008 Mardakert Skirmishes, Armenia and Azerbaijan clashed over Nagorno-Karabakh. The fighting between the two sides was brief, with few casualties on either side. As of July 2020, the new round of military escalation along the border between Armenia and Azerbaijan continued, thus making it one of the most explosive regions in Eurasia. On 27 September 2020, a new military conflict emerged between Azerbaijan and Armenia. The following day, on 28 September 2020, Azerbaijan's President Ilham Aliyev signed a decree declaring a partial military mobilisation following clashes with Armenian forces over the Nagorno-Karabakh region. An armistice agreement between the two countries was signed on 10 November 2020, returning control of the territories surrounding Nagorno-Karabakh to Azerbaijan. On 8 August 2025, in a press conference at the White House, the leaders of Armenia and Azerbaijan agreed to a peace deal, ending the conflict after over three decades.
Bangladesh	26 February 1992	See Azerbaijan–Bangladesh relations
China	28 February 1992	See Azerbaijan–China relations: Azerbaijan has an embassy in Beijing.
India	28 February 1992	See Azerbaijan-India relations
Indonesia	24 September 1992	See Azerbaijan-Indonesia relations
Iran	12 March 1992	See Azerbaijan–Iran relations: Iran recognized Azerbaijan on 4 January 1992.
Iraq	30 March 1992	See Azerbaijan–Iraq relations
Israel	7 April 1992	See Azerbaijan–Israel relations: Azerbaijan is one of the few majority Muslim countries to develop bilateral strategic and economic relations with Israel.; Israel was one of the first countries to recognize Azerbaijan on 25 December 1991.
Japan	7 September 1992	See Azerbaijan–Japan relations: Azerbaijan has an embassy in Tokyo since 12 October 2005.; Japan has an embassy in Baku since 21 January 2000.
Jordan	13 February 1993	See Azerbaijan–Jordan relations
Kazakhstan	30 August 1992	See Azerbaijan–Kazakhstan relations
Kyrgyzstan	19 January 1993	See Azerbaijan-Kyrgyzstan relations
Lebanon	28 September 1992	See Azerbaijan–Lebanon relations
Malaysia	5 April 1993	See Azerbaijan–Malaysia relations: Azerbaijan has an embassy in Kuala Lumpur, and Malaysia has an embassy in Baku
Qatar	14 September 1994	See Azerbaijan–Qatar relations
Pakistan	9 June 1992	See Azerbaijan–Pakistan relations: Pakistan is among the first countries to open an embassy in Baku.; Azerbaijan has an embassy in Islamabad.; Both countries are full members of the Economic Cooperation Organization (ECO) and the Organisation of Islamic Cooperation (OIC).; Due to its support of Azerbaijan in the Nagorno-Karabakh conflict, Pakistan did not recognize Armenia as a state until 2025.; Azerbaijan has also expressed its support for Pakistan's stand on Kashmir.
Palestine	15 April 1992	See Azerbaijan–Palestine relations
Philippines	27 March 1992	See Azerbaijan–Philippines relations
Saudi Arabia	24 February 1992	See Azerbaijan–Saudi Arabia relations
South Korea	23 March 1992	See Azerbaijan–South Korea relations: Azerbaijani embassy in Seoul.; South Korean embassy in Baku.
Syria	28 March 1992	See Azerbaijan–Syria relations
Thailand	7 July 1992	See Azerbaijan–Thailand relations
Turkey	14 January 1992	See Azerbaijan–Turkey relations: Azerbaijan has an embassy in Ankara and Consulates General in Istanbul and Kars and Consular Mission in Iğdır.; Turkey has an embassy in Baku and Consulates General in Nakhchivan and Ganja.; Turkey became the first state to recognize the Republic of Azerbaijan in November 1991.
Turkmenistan	9 June 1992	See Azerbaijan–Turkmenistan relations: The Azerbaijan-Turkmenistan inter-parliamentary friendship group functions in the Milli Majlis (Parliament) of the Republic of Azerbaijan and the Turkmenistan-Azerbaijan inter-parliamentary friendship group works in the Majlis of Turkmenistan.
Uzbekistan	2 October 1995	See Azerbaijan–Uzbekistan relations

=== Europe ===
Country	Formal Relations Began	Notes
Albania	23 September 1993	See Albania–Azerbaijan relations
Austria	20 February 1992	See Austria–Azerbaijan relations: Azerbaijan has an embassy in Vienna.; Austria opened an embassy in Baku in 2010.; Both countries are full members of the Council of Europe and the Organization for Security and Co-operation in Europe (OSCE).
Belarus	11 June 1993	See Azerbaijan–Belarus relations: Before 1918, they were part of the Russian Empire and before 1991, they were part of the Soviet Union.; Azerbaijan has an embassy in Minsk.; Belarus has an embassy in Baku.; Both countries are full members of the Organization for Security and Co-operation in Europe (OSCE) and the Commonwealth of Independent States (CIS).; Also Azerbaijan is a full member of the Council of Europe, Belarus is a candidate.; Belarus is a full member of the Non-Aligned Movement (NAM), Azerbaijan is an observer member.
Belgium	17 June 1992	See Azerbaijan–Belgium relations: Azerbaijan has an embassy in Brussels.; Belgium has an embassy in Baku.; Both countries are full members of the Council of Europe and the Organization for Security and Co-operation in Europe (OSCE).
Bosnia and Herzegovina	19 February 1995	See Azerbaijan–Bosnia and Herzegovina relations: Bosnia and Herzegovina recognized the independence of Azerbaijan on 9 February 1995. Diplomatic relations were established between the two countries on the same day.; Azerbaijan has an embassy in Bosnia and Herzegovina.; Bosnia and Herzegovina is accredited to Azerbaijan from its embassy in Ankara.
Bulgaria	5 June 1992	See Azerbaijan—Bulgaria relations: Azerbaijan has an embassy in Sofia.; Bulgaria has an embassy in Baku.; Both countries are full members of the Council of Europe, the Organization for Security and Co-operation in Europe (OSCE) and the Organization of the Black Sea Economic Cooperation (BSEC).; Bulgaria recognized the independence of Azerbaijan on 14 January 1992.
Croatia	26 January 1995	See Azerbaijan–Croatia relations: Azerbaijan has an embassy in Zagreb; Croatia is represented in Azerbaijan through a non-resident ambassador based in Baku (in the Foreign Ministry).; Croatia is represented in Azerbaijan through its embassy in Ankara (Turkey).; Azerbaijan Ministry of Foreign Affairs about relations with Croatia; Croatian Ministry of Foreign Affairs and European Integration: list of bilateral treaties with Azerbaijan; Both countries are full members of the Council of Europe.
Cyprus		Azerbaijan formally recognizes the government of the Republic of Cyprus as the sole representative of the island, but has not yet established diplomatic relations with Cyprus. The parliament of Azerbaijan's Nakhchivan Autonomous Republic issued a resolution recognizing the Turkish Republic of Northern Cyprus as a sovereign state. While this recognition is not regarded by Azerbaijan and internationally as 'official state-to-state', Azerbaijan itself maintained cordial unofficial relations with the TRNC. In 2004, Azerbaijan threatened to formally recognize the TRNC if the Annan Plan was voted down by the Greek Cypriots (who rejected the plan in one of twin referendums held 24 April 2004 in both the Greek and Turkish zones simultaneously), but backed off the threat when it was pointed out by Cyprus that doing so would be hypocritical, as a portion of its territory just like that of Cyprus itself is under occupation and would probably result in negative impact on its ongoing dispute with Armenia over Nagorno-Karabakh.
Czech Republic	29 January 1993	See Azerbaijan–Czech Republic relations: Azerbaijan has an embassy in Prague, opened on 15 August 2007.
Denmark	2 April 1992	See Azerbaijan–Denmark relations
Estonia	20 April 1992	See Azerbaijan-Estonia relations
Finland	24 March 1992	The Republic of Finland recognized the independence of Azerbaijan on 30 December 1991.
France	21 February 1992	See Azerbaijan—France relations: Azerbaijan has an embassy in Paris.; France has an embassy in Baku.ty and Co-operation in Europe (OSCE).
Georgia	18 November 1992	See Azerbaijan–Georgia relations
Germany	20 February 1992	See Azerbaijan–Germany relations: Azerbaijan has an embassy in Berlin.
Greece	2 April 1992	See Azerbaijan–Greece relations: The Greek embassy in Baku. was opened in the spring of 1993.; The embassy of Azerbaijan in Athens. was opened in August 2004.
Holy See	23 May 1992	See Azerbaijan–Holy See relations: Diplomatic relations with the Holy See were established on 23 May 1992.; Azerbaijan is accredited to the Holy See through its embassy in Paris, France.; The Holy See is accredited to Azerbaijan through its nunciature in Ankara, Turkey.
Hungary	27 April 1992	See Azerbaijan–Hungary relations: Hungary recognized Azerbaijan's independence on 26 December 1991.
Iceland	27 February 1998	See Azerbaijan–Iceland relations: Iceland recognized the independence of Azerbaijan on 19 January 1992.; Diplomatic relations were established between the two countries on 27 February 1998.
Ireland	1 July 1996	See Azerbaijan–Ireland relations: Azerbaijan is represented in Ireland through its embassy in London (United Kingdom).
Italy	8 May 1992	See Azerbaijan–Italy relations: Azerbaijan has an embassy in Rome.; Italy has an embassy in Baku.
Latvia	11 January 1994	See Azerbaijan—Latvia relations: Azerbaijan has an embassy in Riga.
Lithuania	27 November 1995	See Azerbaijan—Lithuania relations
Moldova	29 May 1992	See Azerbaijan–Moldova relations
Montenegro	24 April 2008	See Azerbaijan–Montenegro relations
Netherlands	1 April 1992	See Azerbaijan–Netherlands relations: Azerbaijan has an embassy in The Hague.; The Netherlands has an embassy in Baku.
North Macedonia	28 June 1995	See Azerbaijan—North Macedonia relations
Poland	21 February 1992	See Azerbaijan-Poland relations
Portugal	5 June 1992	See Azerbaijan–Portugal relations: Portugal recognized the independence of Azerbaijan on 7 January 1992.; Diplomatic relations between the two countries were established on 5 June 1992.
Romania	21 June 1992	See Azerbaijan–Romania relations
Russia	4 April 1992	See Azerbaijan–Russia relations: Russia has an embassy in Baku.
Serbia	21 August 1997	See Azerbaijan–Serbia relations
Spain	11 February 1992	See Azerbaijan–Spain relations
Sweden	8 May 1992	See Azerbaijan–Sweden relations
Switzerland	21 January 1992	See Azerbaijan–Switzerland relations: Azerbaijan has an embassy in Bern.; Switzerland has an embassy in Baku.; Switzerland considers Azerbaijan an important country for economic development cooperation.
Ukraine	6 February 1992	See Azerbaijan–Ukraine relations: Azerbaijan has an embassy in Kyiv.; Ukraine has an embassy in Baku.
United Kingdom	11 March 1992	See Azerbaijan – United Kingdom relations: Azerbaijan maintains an embassy in London.; The United Kingdom is accredited to Azerbaijan through its embassy in Baku.; Both countries share common membership of the Council of Europe, European Court of Human Rights, and the OSCE. Bilaterally the two countries have a Double Taxation Agreement, and an Investment Agreement.

=== Oceania ===
Country	Formal Relations Began	Notes
Australia	19 June 1992	See Australia–Azerbaijan relations
New Zealand	29 June 1992	See Azerbaijan–New Zealand relations

== Disputes ==
=== Caviar diplomacy ===
The European Stability Initiative (ESI) has revealed in a report from 2012 with the title "Caviar diplomacy: How Azerbaijan silenced the Council of Europe", that since Azerbaijan's entry into the Council of Europe, each year 30 to 40 deputies are invited to Azerbaijan and generously paid with expensive gifts, including caviar (worth up to 1,400 euro), silk carpets, gold, silver and large amounts of money. In return they become lobbyists for Azerbaijan. This practice has been widely referred to as "Caviar diplomacy".

ESI also published a report on 2013 Presidential elections in Azerbaijan titled "Disgraced: Azerbaijan and the end of election monitoring as we know it". The report revealed the ties between Azerbaijani government and the members of certain observation missions who praised the elections. Azerbaijan's "Caviar diplomacy" at 2013 presidential elections sparked a major international scandal, as the reports of two authoritative organizations Parliamentary Assembly of the Council of Europe/European Parliament and OSCE/ODIHR completely contradicted one another in their assessments of elections.

Non-governmental anti-corruption organization Transparency International has regularly judged Azerbaijan to be one of the most corrupt countries in the world and has also criticized Azerbaijan for the "Caviar diplomacy".

At June 2016 the public prosecutor of Milan has accused the former leader of the (Christian) Union of the center and of the European People's Party of the Parliamentary Assembly of the Council of Europe Luca Volonte of accepting large bribes from representatives of the Azerbaijani government. Two people with high-level experience of the Council of Europe's parliamentary assembly (Pace) have told the Guardian they believe its members have been offered bribes for votes by Azerbaijan. Former Azerbaijani diplomat, Arif Mammadov, alleged that a member of Azerbaijan's delegation at the Council of Europe had €30m (£25m) to spend on lobbying its institutions, including the Council of Europe assembly. PACE ratified the terms of reference of an independent external investigation body to carry out a detailed independent inquiry into the allegations of corruption at the council involving Azerbaijan.

==== ESISC report ====
On 6 March 2017, ESISC (European Strategic Intelligence and Security Center) published a scandalous report called "The Armenian Connection" where it veraciously attacked human rights NGOs and research organisations criticising human rights violations and corruption in Azerbaijan, Turkey, and Russia.

ESISC in that report asserted that "Caviar diplomacy" report elaborated by ESI aimed to create climate of suspicion based on slander to form a network of MPs that would engage in a political war against Azerbaijan. In the Second Chapter of the report called "The Armenian Connection: «Mr X», Nils Muižnieks, Council of Europe Commissioner for Human Rights" that was published on 18 April 2017 ESISC asserted that the network composed of European PMs, Armenian officials and some NGOs: Human Rights Watch, Amnesty International, "Human Rights House Foundation", "Open Dialog", European Stability Initiative, and Helsinki Committee for Human Rights, was financed by the Soros Foundation. According to ESISC the key figure of the network since 2012 has been Nils Muižnieks, Commissioner for Human Rights of the Council of Europe and the network has served to the interests of George Soros and the Republic of Armenia. "The report is written in the worst traditions of authoritarian propaganda, makes absurd claims, and is clearly aimed at deflecting the wave of criticism against cover-up of unethical lobbying and corruption in PACE and demands for change in the Assembly", said Freedom Files Analytical Centre.

According Robert Coalson (Radio Free Europe), ESISC is a part of Baku's lobbying efforts to extend to the use of front think tanks to shift public opinion.

European Stability Initiative said that "ESISC report is full of lies (such as claiming that German PACE member Strasser holds pro-Armenian views and citing as evidence that he went to Yerevan in 2015 to commemorate the Armenian genocide, when Strasser has never in his life been to independent Armenia)".

== See also ==
- Azerbaijan–European Union relations
- Azerbaijan–NATO relations
- Azerbaijan and the International Monetary Fund
- List of diplomatic missions in Azerbaijan
- List of diplomatic missions of Azerbaijan
- Visa requirements for Azerbaijani citizens
