= Azerbaijan–Jordan relations =

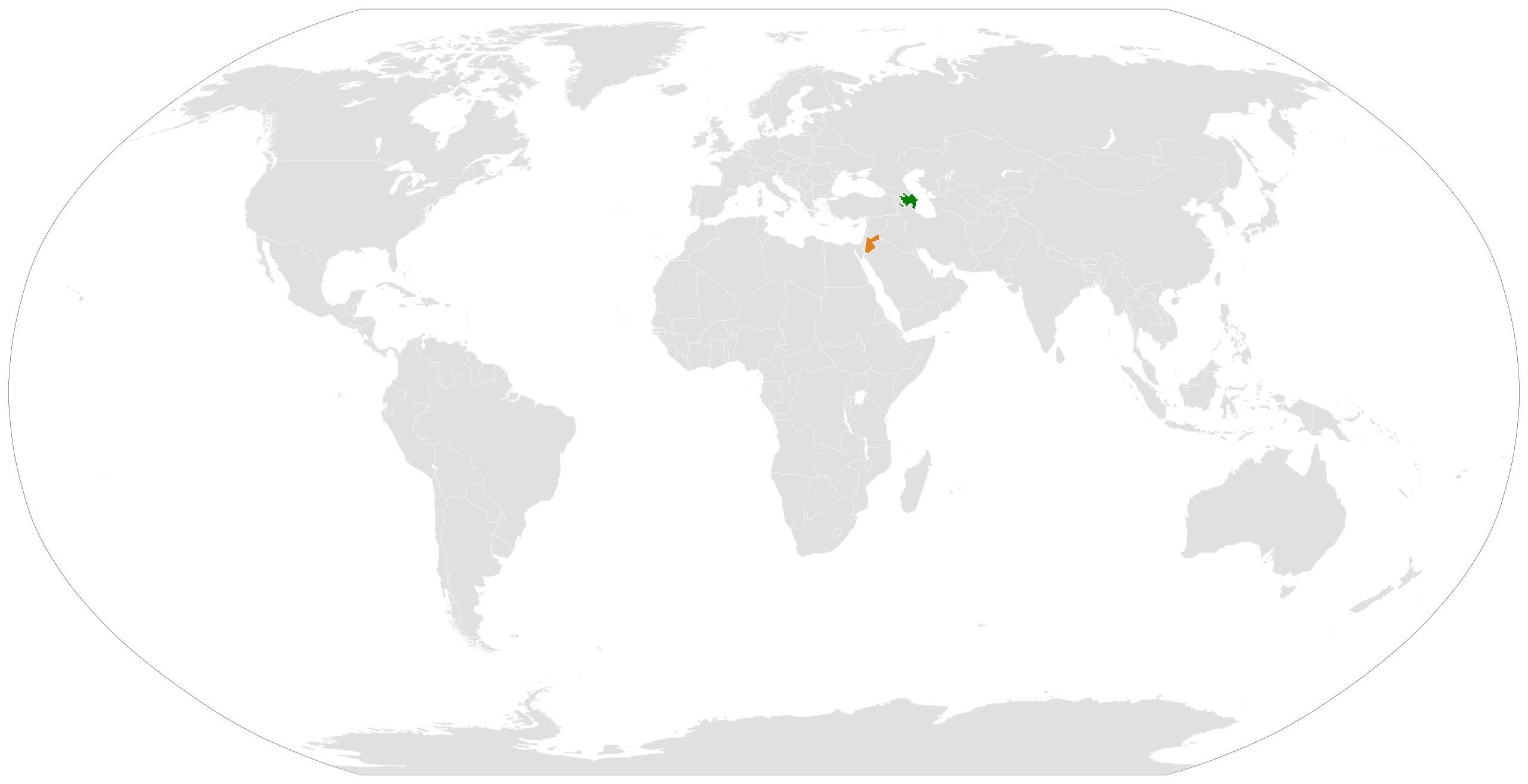

- Azerbaijan: Jordan

Diplomatic mission
- Embassy of Azerbaijan, Amman: Embassy of Jordan, Baku

Envoy
- Azerbaijan Ambassador to Jordan Eldar Salimov: Jordan Ambassador to Azerbaijan Omar B. Al Nahar

Bilateral relations exist between Azerbaijan and Jordan. Cooperation between the countries is carried out in such areas as justice, tourism, defense, Information and communication technologies (ICT), transport, statistics, military affairs, standardization, emergency management, etc.

== Diplomatic relations ==
Jordan recognized the independence of the Republic of Azerbaijan on 28 December 1991. Diplomatic relations between Azerbaijan and Jordan were established on 13 February 1993.

Azerbaijani opened its embassy in Amman on 28 May 2006. The Jordanian Embassy in Baku was opened on 5 May 2007.

Currently, there is a working group in the National Assembly of Azerbaijan on inter-parliamentary relations between Azerbaijan and Jordan, consisting of 7 deputies and headed by Arasta Javadova. Jordan's Ambassador to Baku is Sami Abdullah Gosheh. Azerbaijan's Ambassador to Jordan is Rasim Rzayev.

On 31 March 2014, the Jordanian-Azerbaijani Interparliamentary friendship group was established in the Parliament (House of Representatives) of Jordan, and Deputy Hazemgashu was elected as its head. On 15 July 2014, the Jordan-Azerbaijan inter-parliamentary group of the brotherhood was also established in the upper house of the Kingdom's Parliament, the Senate, and a member of the Senate, Mohammad Sgour, was elected as the head of this group.

== Legal framework ==
=== Main agreements ===
1. "Framework agreement between the Government of the Republic of Azerbaijan and The government of the Hashemite Kingdom of Jordan on bilateral cooperation”
2. Memorandum of understanding between the Ministry of Foreign Affairs of the Republic of Azerbaijan and the Ministry of Foreign Affairs of the Hashemite Kingdom of Jordan”
3. "Agreement between the Government of the Republic of Azerbaijan and The government of the Hashemite Kingdom of Jordan on visa-free entry of citizens holding diplomatic and service passports»

Legal framework: 41 documents were signed between Azerbaijan and Jordan (24 intergovernmental agreements, the remaining 17 – agreements between private organizations, reports of Commission meetings, executive programs and action plans). Some of them are the followings:

1. "Memorandum of understanding on technical, economic and cultural cooperation between the Government of the Republic of Azerbaijan and The government of the Hashemite Kingdom of Jordan" (13 February 1993).
2. "Joint statement" (13 February 1993).
3. "Framework agreement on cooperation between the Government of the Republic of Azerbaijan and The government of the Hashemite Kingdom of Jordan" (23 August 2006).
4. "Agreement on economic and technical cooperation between the Government of the Republic of Azerbaijan and The government of the Hashemite Kingdom of Jordan" (07.11.2006).
5. "Trade agreement between the Government of the Republic of Azerbaijan and The government of the Hashemite Kingdom of Jordan" (07.11.2006).
6. "Agreement between the Government of the Republic of Azerbaijan and The government of the Hashemite Kingdom of Jordan on cooperation in the field of tourism" (07.11.2006)
7. "Agreement on cooperation between the chamber of Commerce and industry of the Republic of Azerbaijan and the chamber of Commerce and industry of the Hashemite Kingdom of Jordan" (07.11.2006).
8. "Memorandum of understanding between the Azerbaijan export and investment promotion Fund (AzPromo) and the Jordan business development Corporation" (07.11.2006).
9. "Memorandum of understanding between the state concern "Azerbaijan Airlines" and the Department of civil aviation of Jordan" (07.11.2006).
10. "Memorandum of understanding between the Ministry of Foreign Affairs of the Republic of Azerbaijan and the Ministry of Foreign Affairs of the Hashemite Kingdom of Jordan" (09.04.2007).

Documents considered and agreed between Azerbaijan and the Hashemite Kingdom of Jordan:

1. "Draft agreement between the State customs Committee of the Republic of Azerbaijan and the Customs Administration of the Hashemite Kingdom of Jordan on cooperation in the field of professional development of personnel and improvement of their professional knowledge" (considered by the Jordanian side).
2. "Memorandum of understanding between the Republic of Azerbaijan and the Hashemite Kingdom of Jordan on the training of seafarers, the issuance of diplomas and the recognition of certificates in accordance with rule 1/10 Of the international Convention of 1978 in turn" (agreed).
3. "Instructions for the implementation of the agreement between the Government of the Republic of Azerbaijan and The government of the Hashemite Kingdom of Jordan on cooperation in the field of emergency management" (considered by the Azerbaijani side).
4. "Draft agreement between the Government of the Republic of Azerbaijan and The government of the Hashemite Kingdom of Jordan on mutual assistance in the field of customs Affairs" (considered by the Azerbaijani side).
5. "Draft agreement on security cooperation between the Government of the Republic of Azerbaijan and The government of the Hashemite Kingdom of Jordan" (under consideration by the Jordanian side).
6. "Memorandum of understanding between the Ministry of industry and energy of the Republic of Azerbaijan and the Ministry of energy and mineral resources of the Hashemite Kingdom of Jordan on cooperation in the field of energy, oil and gas exploration and mineral resources" (considered by the Jordanian side).
7. "Draft agreement on cooperation between the Ministry of Finance of the Republic of Azerbaijan and the Ministry of Finance of the Hashemite Kingdom of Jordan" (passed the internal procedure in Azerbaijan).
8. "Draft agreement on air traffic between the Government of the Republic of Azerbaijan and The government of the Hashemite Kingdom of Jordan" (agreed).
9. "Draft agreement on commercial navigation between the Government of the Republic of Azerbaijan and the Government of the Hashemite Kingdom of Jordan" (considered by the Jordanian side).
10. "Draft Memorandum of understanding between the Ministry of education of the Republic of Azerbaijan and the Ministry of higher education and scientific research of the Hashemite Kingdom of Jordan on cooperation in the field of higher education and scientific research" (considered by the Azerbaijani side).
11. "Draft Memorandum of understanding between the National Academy of Sciences of Azerbaijan and the Supreme Council for science and technology of Jordan" (submitted directly by the Azerbaijani side). The Jordanian side expressed its readiness to sign the document.
12. "Draft Memorandum of understanding on cooperation between the Ministry of agriculture of the Republic of Azerbaijan and the Ministry of agriculture of the Hashemite Kingdom of Jordan" (agreed).
13. "Draft Memorandum of cooperation between the Ministry of taxes of the Republic of Azerbaijan and the tax Department of Jordan in the field of activities of tax authorities" (agreed).
14. "Program of cooperation between the Government of the Republic of Azerbaijan and The government of the Hashemite Kingdom of Jordan in the fields of science and education, culture and art, youth and sports, archaeology, health and media for 2013–2014" (agreed).

== Economic cooperation ==
In comparison with 2009, in 2010 the mutual trade turnover between the countries increased by 38.5%.

In autumn 2011, the first meeting of the joint Commission on cooperation in the field of transport was held.

In 2011, an agreement was reached to start cooperation in the field of high technologies. In 2012, the first meeting of the joint Azerbaijani-Jordanian working group on cooperation in the field of Information and communication technologies (ICT) was held.

== Military-technical cooperation ==
The countries cooperate in the military sphere.

In 2011, the joint production of bulletproof vests and helmets started.

== Tourism ==
During the official visit of Jordan's King Abdullah II to Azerbaijan in December 2019, AZAL President Jahangir Askerov met with Jordan's Ambassador to Azerbaijan Sami Asem Gosheh. An agreement was reached to open direct flights between the two countries. The first flights were scheduled for May 2020.

== International cooperation ==
On 19 June 2013, the leadership of the Jordanian Senate Council adopted a Resolution on the occasion of the 20th anniversary of the Khojaly genocide. Jordan supports Azerbaijan in the Nagorno-Karabakh conflict.

In the international arena, cooperation between countries is carried out within the framework of various international organizations: the UN Security Council, the Organization of Islamic Cooperation (OIC), etc.

== Cultural ties ==
From the end of November to the beginning of December 2010, there were days of Azerbaijani culture held in Jordan.

== See also ==
- Foreign relations of Azerbaijan
- Foreign relations of Jordan
