= Azerbaijan–Italy relations =

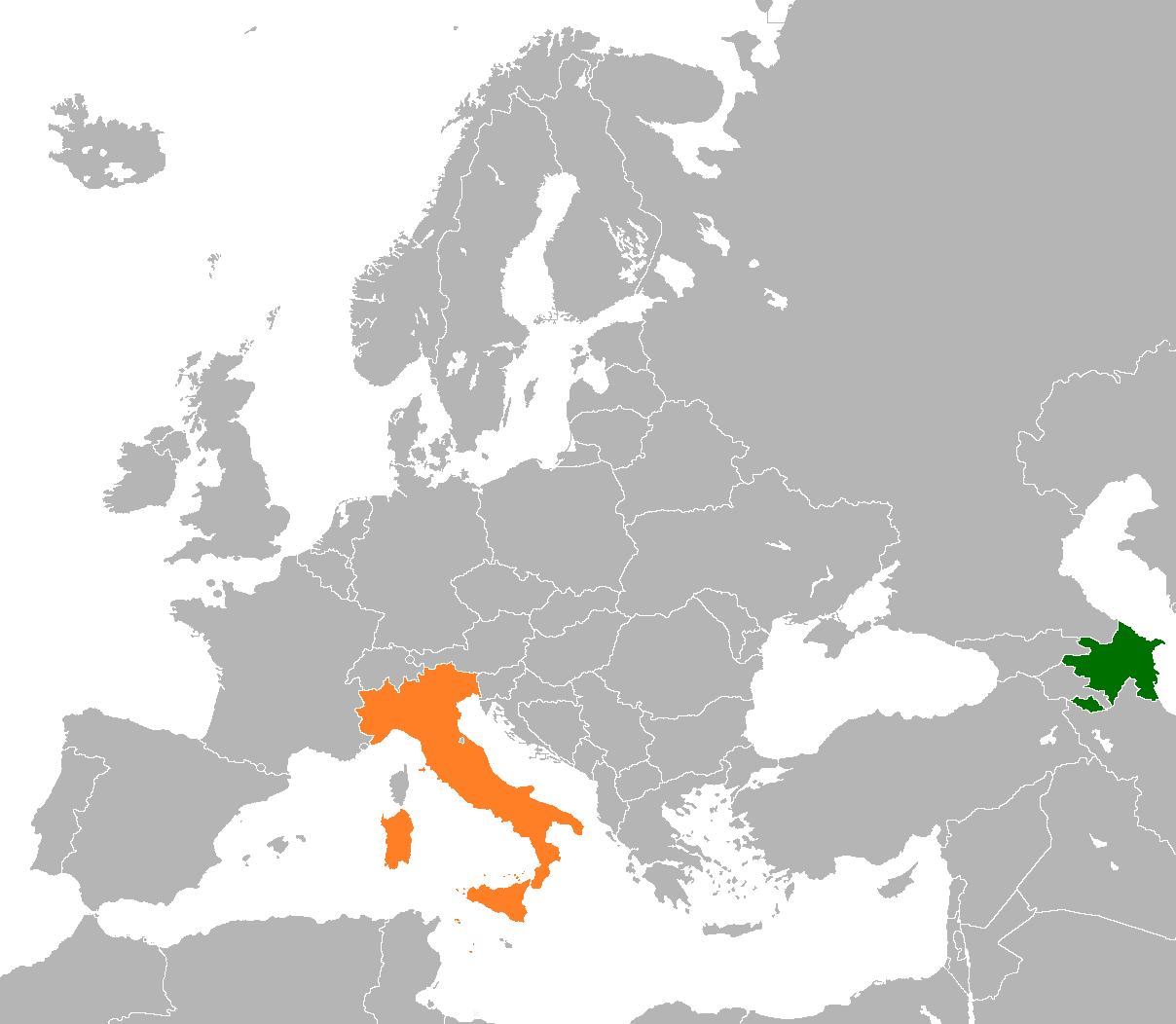

- Azerbaijan: Italy

Diplomatic mission
- Embassy of Azerbaijan, Rome: Embassy of Italy, Baku

Envoy
- Ambassador Rashad Aslanov: Ambassador Luca Di Gianfrancesco

Bilateral ties exist between Azerbaijan and Italy. Azerbaijan has an embassy in Rome, while Italy has an embassy in Baku. Both countries are full members of the Council of Europe and the Organization for Security and Co-operation in Europe (OSCE).

== History ==
=== Azerbaijan Democratic Republic ===
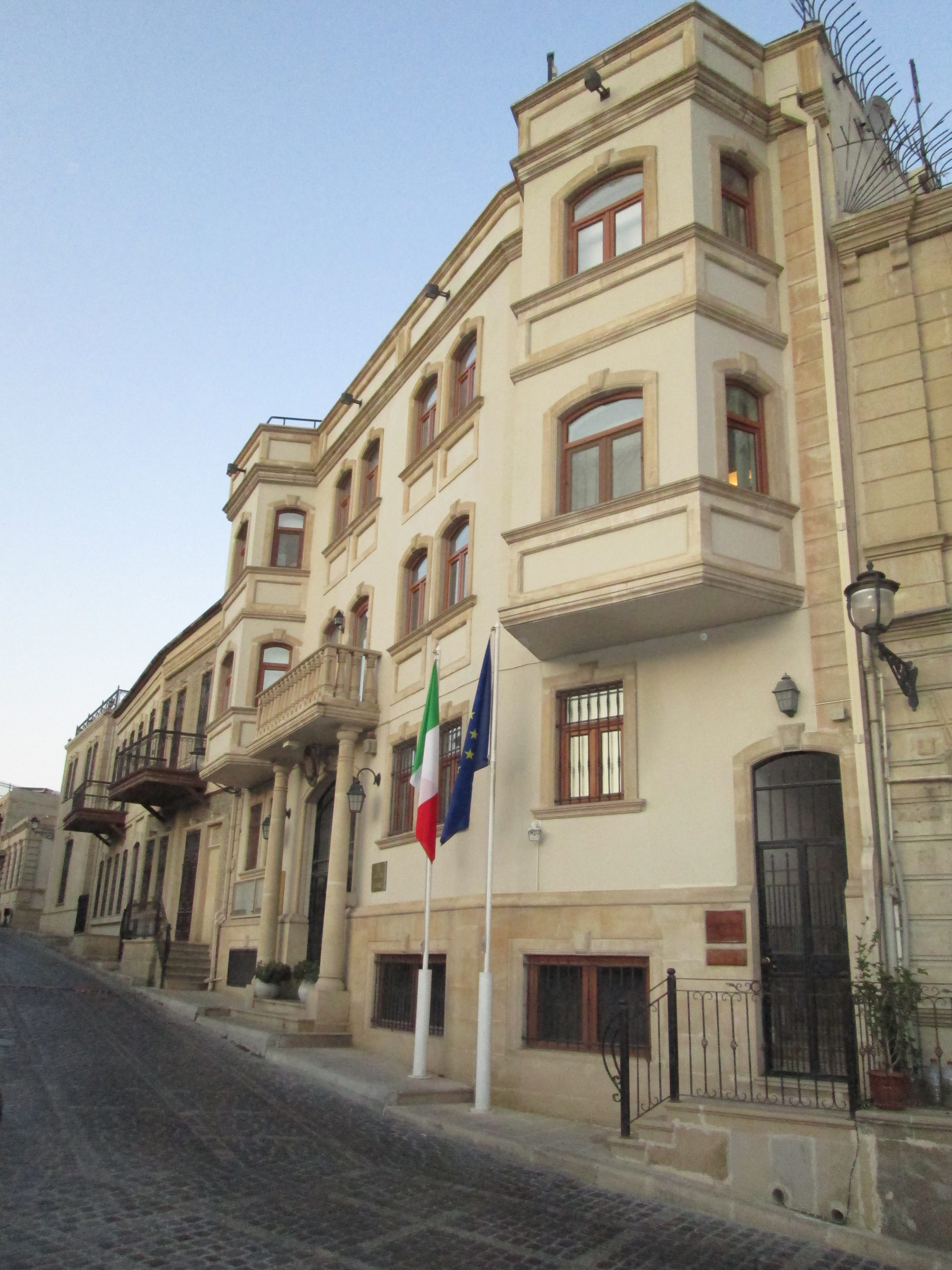
Embassy of Italy in Baku

Russo-Persian War resulted in the invasion of present-day Azerbaijan territory by Russian Empire. After the collapse of the Russian Empire, Azerbaijan Democratic Republic established the first democratic and secular state in the whole Muslim world. Italy was one of the countries that was able to establish diplomatic relations with Azerbaijan. Italy opened its consulate and military office in Baku. In that time, official visits of an Azerbaijani delegation to Italy and an Italian delegation to Azerbaijan took place.

=== Recent political relations ===
Italy recognized the independence of Azerbaijan from Soviet Union on January 1, 1992. The diplomatic relations between the two countries were established on May 8, 1992. The first embassy of Italy among the Southern Caucasian republics was opened in Azerbaijan in 1997 and the embassy of Azerbaijan to Italy has been functioning since 2003.

Heydar Aliyev paid his first official visit to Italy in September 1997 and, between 1998 and 2003 government officials of Italy visited Azerbaijan, which resulted in signed agreements on cooperation in different spheres. Italian ambassadors to Azerbaijan have stated that the travel visa requirements might be softened between the two countries in the near future. In April 1999, Italy opened a new building of the Italian Embassy in Baku.

== The Nagorno-Karabakh conflict ==
Italy is notable for being the first chairman of OSCE Minsk Group's acting for the peaceful settlement of the Nagorno-Karabakh conflict. During Ilham Aliyev's official visits to Italy the subject was touched on again. President Carlo Azeglio Ciampi reminded that the attempts of the Minsk Group of OSCE had not produced any results yet and stated that he would do his best to strengthen the activity of the Minsk Group. In June 2005, during his visit to Azerbaijan, the head of the Committee on Foreign Affairs and Migration of the Senate of Italy, said that Italy will protect the just position of Azerbaijan in the Nagorno-Karabakh conflict to the Parliamentary Assembly of the Council of Europe.

== Economic relations ==
Italy has become the biggest trade partner of Azerbaijan in importing crude oil and oil products. 51.9% of exportation from Azerbaijan has been directed to Italy since 2003. Italy mainly exports pipes for the oil sector, tobacco, leather, and furniture to Azerbaijan. The visits of the ministers of Economic Developments of both countries in 2007 resulted in signed agreements on the cooperation between Azerbaijan and Italy in the sector of natural gas.

=== Co-operation in oil ===
In 2005 Azerbaijan exported 50% of its oil to Italy. The owner of a 5% share in the Contract of the Century, an Italian company Eni-Agip, is involved in the construction of the Baku-Tbilisi-Ceyhan oil pipeline. A number of other companies in Italy also participated in the construction of the pipeline on the basis of the contract. The official opening ceremony was held in July 2006. Eni-Agip is also active in the project Shahdeniz and in the oil field Kyurdashy. In June 2013, it was decided that the Trans-Adriatic Pipeline (TAP) will go from Azerbaijan through Turkey and Greece to southern Italy.

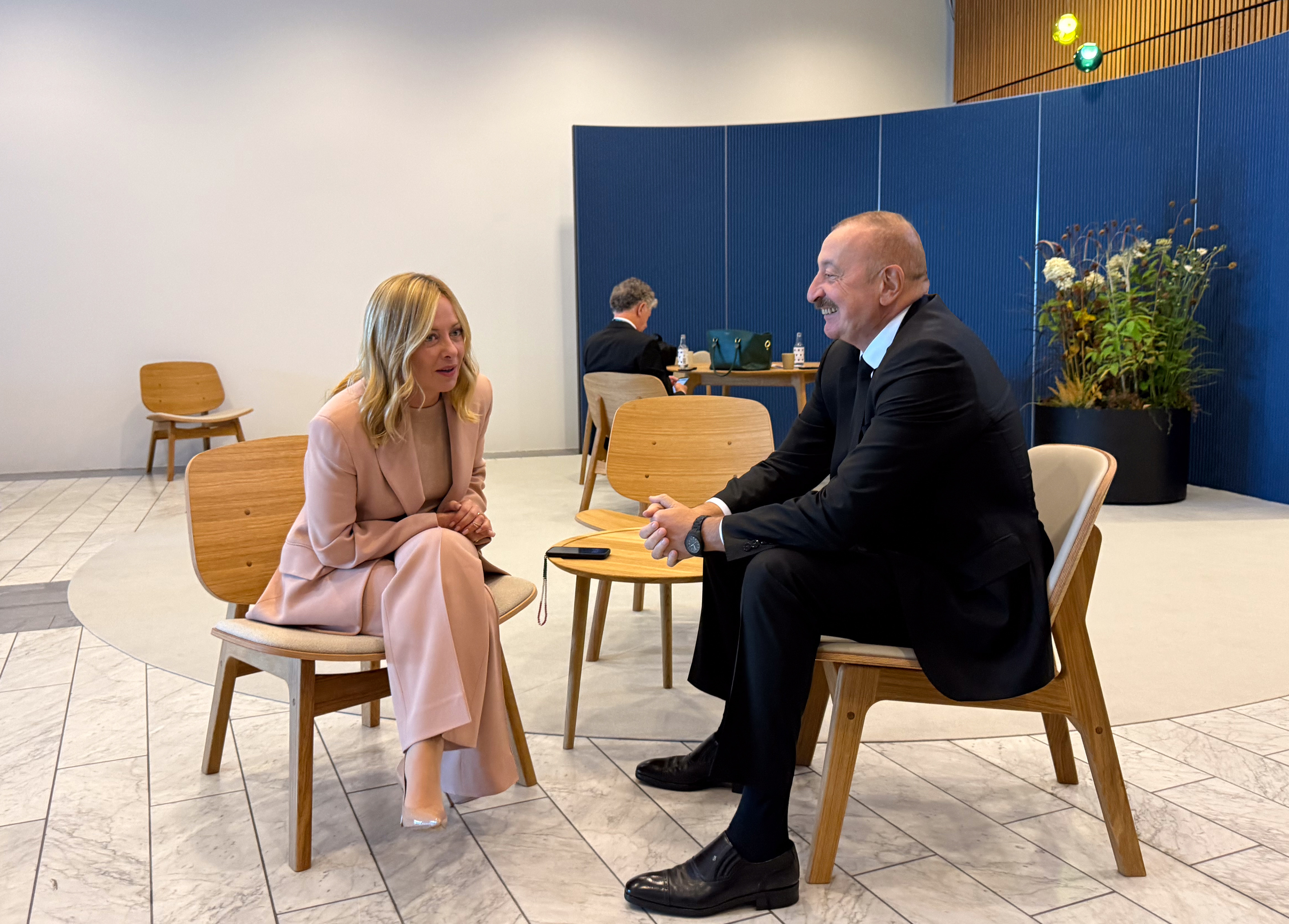
Ilham Aliyev and Giorgia Meloni Copenhagen October 2025

=== Cooperation in the field of viticulture ===
Azerbaijan also plans to collaborate with the Italian Vivai Cooperativi Rauscedo in the field of viticulture. Italy's Manual Vivai Cooperativi Rauscedo and, in order to exchange experience, has invited officials of the Ministry of Agriculture of Azerbaijan economy to Italy.

=== Imports and exports ===
Imports of Azerbaijan
Year	Amount Thousands of USD
2019	369 900
2020	396 214 ▲
2021	419 657 ▲
2022	340 432,64 ▼
2023	477 903,97 ▲
2024	515 802,37 ▲
2025	518 082,16 ▲

Exports of Azerbaijan
Year	Amount Thousands of USD
2020	4 172 239 ▼
2021	9 243 521 ▲
2022	17 782 508,08 ▲
2023	15 208 067,60 ▼
2024	10 875 130,22 ▼
2025	11 342 330,41 ▲

Export goods: oil, gas, food

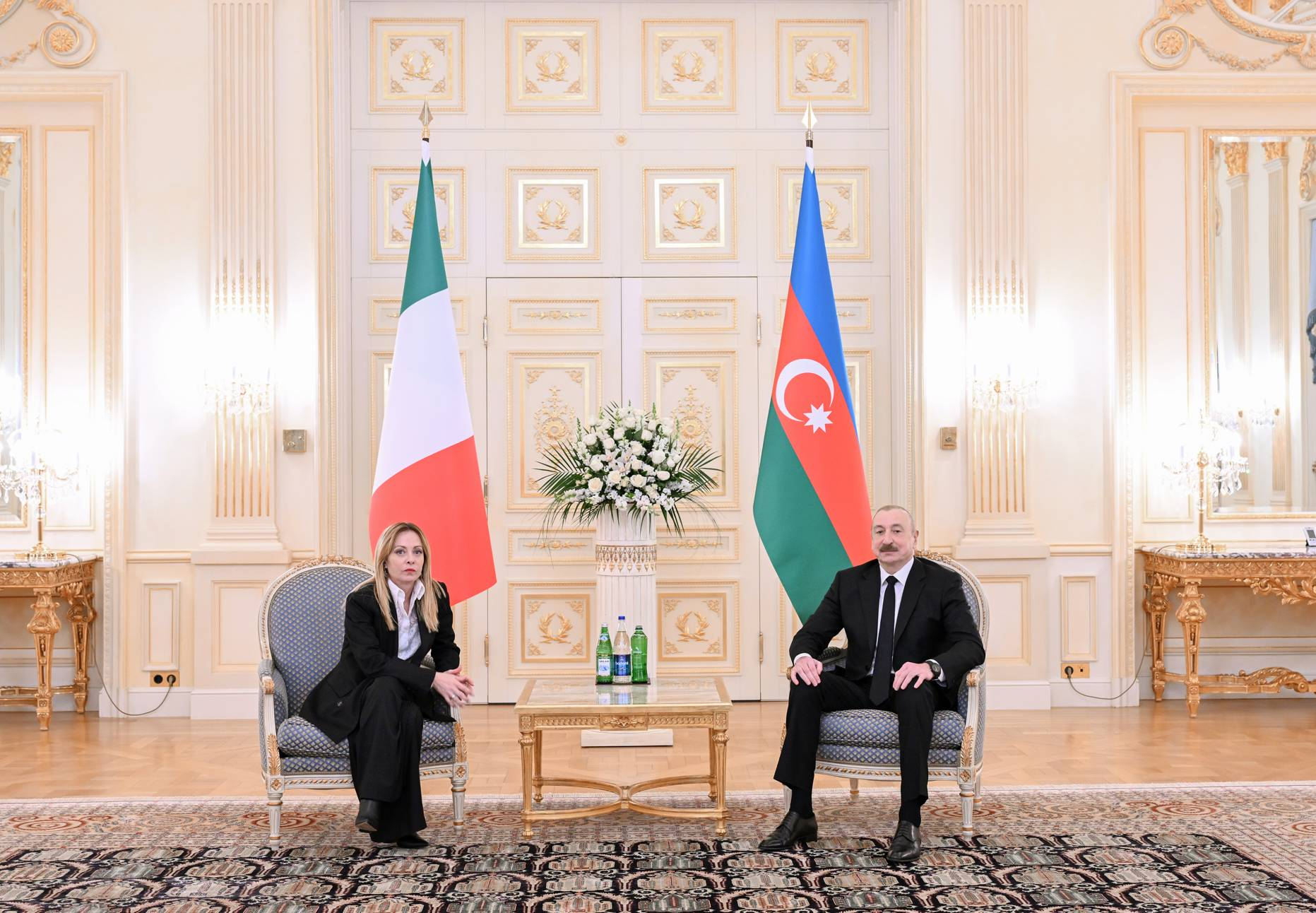
Ilham Aliyev and Giorgia Meloni Baku May 2025

== Cultural relations ==
During the Soviet era, in 1972, the city of Italy, Naples, and the Azerbaijani capital, Baku, were declared Sister cities. Since that time, the cultural ties between Italy and Azerbaijan have become more intense but relations between the two countries have a long history which can be seen from travelers visiting Azerbaijan in the Middle Ages (including Marco Polo) and Nasreddin Tusi's book "Interpretation of Euclid's "Elements" being translated into Latin and published in 1594 in Rome. There are different paintings by well-known Italian painters in museums of Azerbaijan, and many carpets and jewelry articles made in Azerbaijan are in different museums and private collections in Italy. Since the end of the 19th and the beginning of the 20th century in Baku, different buildings were built by famous Italian architects. The works of Dante and Petrarch were translated into Azerbaijani and published in great quantities. Some legendary singers of Azerbaijan such as Bulbul and Muslim Magomayev mastered the bases of opera art in Italy. Many cultural events have been held in both countries.

== Resident diplomatic missions ==
- Azerbaijan has an embassy in Rome.
- Italy has an embassy in Baku.

== See also ==
- Foreign relations of Azerbaijan
- Foreign relations of Italy
- Roman influence in Caucasian Albania
