= Azerbaijan–Burkina Faso relations =

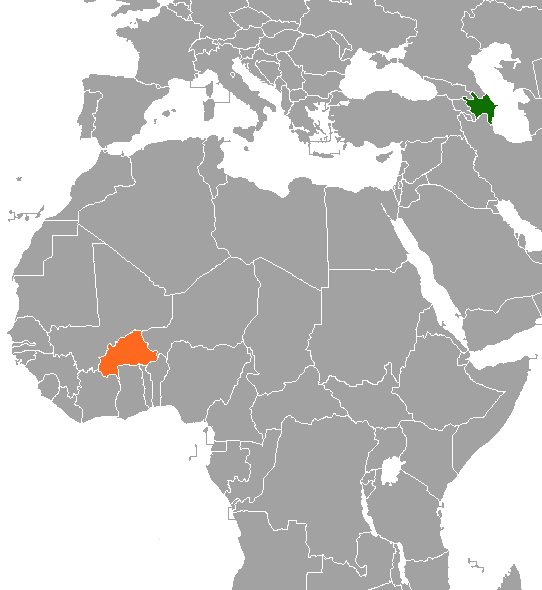

- Azerbaijan: Burkina Faso

Bilateral relations exist between the Republic of Azerbaijan and the Republic of Burkina Faso in the diplomatic, cultural, socio-economic and other spheres. Neither country has a resident ambassador. Burkina Faso has a non-resident embassy in Ankara.

== Diplomatic relations ==
Diplomatic relations between Azerbaijan and Burkina Faso were established for the first time on May 31, 2004. Earlier, on May 28, 2004, the governments of the two countries had signed a protocol on the establishment of diplomatic relations.

== Economic cooperation ==
Burkina Faso's main export to Azerbaijan is energy, in which sector there has been bilateral cooperation.

According to United Nations statistics, Azerbaijan's exports to Burkina Faso in 2018 amounted to 51,744 US dollars.

According to United Nations statistics, Burkina Faso's exports to Azerbaijan in 2019 amounted to 3,644 US dollars.

== International cooperation ==
Cooperation between Azerbaijan and Burkina Faso in the international arena is carried out within the framework of various organizations, including the Organization of Islamic Cooperation, UNESCO, and the African Union.

== Humanitarian assistance ==
In 2011–2012, the Azerbaijan International Development Agency (AIDA) provided $50,000 US dollars in financial assistance to Burkina Faso to overcome an ongoing food crisis.

== Joint projects ==
On December 3–8, 2012, within the framework of an equal partnership between the Azerbaijan International Development Agency (AIDA) and the Islamic development Bank jointly launched the campaign “preventing avoidable blindness” in the capital of Burkina Faso, Ouagadougou. During the campaign, local residents underwent cataract surgery. In addition, there was a training provided for five ophthalmologists from Burkina Faso. A similar campaign was launched again in May 2013.

There are a number of regional and international projects implemented with the participation of SOCAR.

In 2016, there were several commercial agreements signed between the State oil company of Azerbaijan SOCAR Trading and the oil company of Burkina Faso SONABHY for the supply of petroleum products to Burkina Faso.

== See also ==
- Foreign relations of Azerbaijan
- Foreign relations of Burkina Faso
