= Azerbaijan–Japan relations =

- Azerbaijan: Japan

Azerbaijan–Japan relations are the bilateral relations between the Republic of Azerbaijan and Japan in the political, socio-economic, and cultural fields.

Azerbaijan has an embassy in Tokyo, while Japan has an embassy in Baku. Azerbaijan's ambassador to Tokyo is Farid Talibov. Japan's ambassador to Azerbaijan is Teruyuki Katori.

== History ==
Japan was one of the first countries which recognized the independence of Azerbaijan. On September 7, 1992, diplomatic relations between the Republic of Azerbaijan and Japan were established. The Japanese Embassy in Azerbaijan has been operating since 21 January 2000. The representation of Azerbaijan in Tokyo arose on 1 October 2002.

From 1992 to 2019 several agreements in the humanitarian, economic, and other fields were signed between the governments of Azerbaijan and Japan. Inter-parliamentary friendship groups were established, and a joint intergovernmental commission is functioning.

== High level visits ==
The first official visit of the President of Azerbaijan (former president Heydar Aliyev) to Japan took place from 24 to 28 February 1998. During the visit, the parties signed 10 documents:

1. Agreement of friendship and partnership;
2. Agreement on cooperation in the field of trade and economy;
3. Consultation agreement;
4. A loan agreement on a project for the construction of a combined cycle power plant called “Severnaya”;
5. Protocol on gratuitous humanitarian aid allocated to Azerbaijan by Japan; A loan agreement between the Azerbaijani leadership and the Import-Export Bank (Japan) on financing a project for the restoration of the Erna Ethylene-Polyethylene Plant installation;
6. Agreement between SOCAR (State Oil Company of the Azerbaijan Republic) and Mitsui Oil Exploration Co., Ltd. on the provision of equity participation.

After this official visit, the Parliamentary Association for Friendship between Japan and Azerbaijan was established. The parties signed a statement of friendship and partnership, as well as a statement on cooperation in the field of trade and economy.

In 1998, "Joint Statement on Friendship and Partnership between Japan and the Republic of Azerbaijan" was signed.

Within the framework of the visit of the President of the Republic of Azerbaijan Ilham Aliyev to Tokyo in March 2006, the parties signed a communique on friendship and cooperation and an agreement on technical cooperation.

During the official meeting of Azerbaijani Foreign Minister Elmar Mammadyarov and Japanese Foreign Minister Taro Kono in September 2018, the Japanese side proposed the Caucasus Initiative program, the essence of which is joint business activities.

== Economic relations ==
In the 1970s, a household air conditioner factory was built in Baku with the financial support of the Japanese government. In 1997, mutual trade turnover amounted to US$22.3 million.

In 2005, Japan hosted the Expo 2005 exhibition, one of the participants of which was Azerbaijan, led by former Deputy Prime Minister Abid Sharifov. Azerbaijan Day was held. In 2015, the 48th meeting of the Board of Governors of the Asian Development Bank (ADB) was held in Baku. In October 2015, as part of the visit of the Minister of Economic Renewal Affairs of Japan, Mr. Akira Amari to Azerbaijan, a memorandum of understanding was signed on cooperation between Japan and Azerbaijan in the field of medicine. In 2017, trade with Japan amounted to approximately US$22.08 million. In 2017, the export mission of Azerbaijan to Japan was organized. It was planned to conclude an agreement on the promotion and protection of investments. In February 2017, the 9th meeting of the Japan-Azerbaijan Economic Committee was held in the capital city of Baku. The meeting discussed the prospect of developing cooperation in the non-oil sector.

The share of Japan in the project for developing Azeri-Chirag-Guneshli fields is 3.65% (ITOCHU). In 2018, 30 Japanese companies functioned in Azerbaijan. Japan exports automobiles (mainly ISUZU trucks), machinery, electronic equipment, household items, and so on to Azerbaijan. Agricultural goods (wine, dried fruits), aluminum, and oil are imported by Japan from Azerbaijan.

=== Oil sector ===
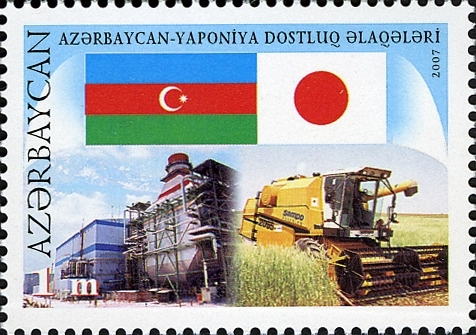
Azerbaijani postage stamp devoted to Azerbaijan-Japan friendly relations in 2007

Since 1995 two leading Japanese companies (ITOCHU and INPEX) have joined the “Contract of the Century”. Cooperation was established between Japan and Azerbaijan in the oil field.

In December 1998, the first consortium of Japanese companies was opened in Azerbaijan (Japan Petroleum Exploration Co., Inpex Nord Ltd. of Japan, Japan National Oil Corporation, Teikoku Oil Corporation, Itochu). SOCAR and the consortium signed a contract for the development of the Yanan Tava, Mugan-Deniz, and Atashgah deposits. In 2015, the State Oil Fund of Azerbaijan (SOFAZ) and the Mitsubishi UFJ Trust and Banking Corporation purchased Kirarito Ginza retail property in Tokyo for $436 million.

In December 2016, during a meeting between the president of SOCAR and the chief director of Itochu (Japan) Masahiro Imai, a number of agreements on joint activities were signed. In 2018, a memorandum was signed between the State Oil Company of Azerbaijan (SOCAR) and Japan Oil, Gas and Metals National Corporation (JOGMEC). The memorandum was about cooperation on a survey of oil-gas blocks and human resources development.

=== Energy ===
In the energy sector, the Japanese Government financed the construction of two power plants in Azerbaijan. In June 2019 a Memorandum of Understanding on cooperation in the area of renewable energy was signed between Azerbaijan and Japan. This cooperation serves to develop the renewable energy sector in Azerbaijan.

=== Aviation ===
In January 2016, the leadership of Silk Way West Airlines opened a direct freight air service between the cities of Baku and Komatsu. In summer of 2017, negotiations were held in Baku between representatives of the aviation administrations of both countries. The topic of discussion was the possibility of opening direct cargo and passenger flights.

=== Other areas ===
Japan and Azerbaijan also cooperate in other areas such as high technology, agribusiness, pharmaceuticals, education, and tourism.

In December 2009, the Japanese government allocated $763.82 for the implementation of 8 projects in Azerbaijan. On 25 December, 8 projects of non-governmental organizations and the Rayon Education Department were prepared. It is planned to improve the irrigation system in 8 villages of the Berde and Terter districts; construction of schools in the villages of Khurshud (Salyan region) and Ikinji Nagadi (Guba district). In July 2015, a grant agreement was signed between the governments of both countries in the city of Balaken on the project “Improvement of the waste management system”.

In October 2015, as part of the visit of the Minister of Economic Renewal Affairs of Japan, Mr. Akira Amari to Azerbaijan, Japan and Azerbaijan signed a letter of intent highlighting the cooperation in the economic field between the two countries.

== International cooperation ==
Japan voted for the election of Azerbaijan as a non-permanent member of the UN Security Council (2012-2013).

== Tourism ==
In 2013, 373 Azerbaijani citizens applied to the Japanese delegation for a visa. In the same year, 2,471 people from Japan visited Azerbaijan. Since February 1, 2016, citizens of a number of eastern countries, including Japan, have achieved simplification of permission to obtain an entry visa at the international airports of Azerbaijan. Earlier, in January of the same year, the rules for visas for Azerbaijan were simplified for Japanese citizens. The Japanese were granted single-entry visas for a period of 30 days at all international Azerbaijani airports.

The number of tourists from Japan increased by 37.1 percent in 2019.

== Cultural relations ==
Seminars and training courses are organized in Azerbaijan every year. The Japanese language is taught both in secondary schools and in universities in Azerbaijan such as Baku State University, the Azerbaijan University of Languages, etc. The Azerbaijani language is taught at the Yunus Emre Center for Turkish Culture in Tokyo. A number of cooperation agreements were concluded between the ADA and the higher education institutions of Japan: Doshisha, Ritsumeikan, Kyoto, Osaka, Yamanashi Gakuin.

In 2013, a twinning agreement was concluded between the city of Ismayilli (Azerbaijan) and Ito (Japan, Shizuoka Prefecture). In the Park of Culture and Leisure named after Heydar Aliyev (Ismayilli), a Japanese garden was laid. In August 2015, a Japanese garden was also laid in the Heydar Aliyev Park (Khatai district, Baku). The Japan-Azerbaijan Friendship Association operates in the capital city of Tokyo.

Japanese cultural exports to Azerbaijan include video games, animation, cinema, music, and food.

== Japan Research Center ==
In February 2012, the Japan Research Center opened at the Azerbaijan University of Languages. The goal of the institution is to teach the Japanese language and spread the culture of Japan in Azerbaijan. The center is directly connected with the Japanese representative office in Azerbaijan. At the initiative of the Japan Research Center, a student exchange agreement was concluded between the Azerbaijan University of Languages and the Japanese University of Tsukuba. According to the agreement, every year three students of the Azerbaijan University of Languages study at the University of Tsukuba free of charge.

== Humanitarian aid ==
Until 2019 Japan has provided technical assistance to Azerbaijan in the amount of more than $1 billion. Japan provided humanitarian assistance to the refugee of Azerbaijan in the amount of $11,470 million after the Karabakh war.

Since 2000, Japan has provided material assistance to Azerbaijan as part of the assistance program. In the spring of 2011, Azerbaijan provided humanitarian assistance to Japan to recover from a major earthquake in the eastern part of the country. In 2015, Japan provided assistance to Azerbaijan in the form of a grant worth $900,000 for the development of agriculture.

== Resident diplomatic missions ==
- Azerbaijan has an embassy in Tokyo.
- Japan has an embassy in Baku.

== See also ==
- Foreign relations of Azerbaijan
- Foreign relations of Japan
