= Azerbaijan–India relations =

- India: Azerbaijan

Diplomatic mission
- Embassy of India in Baku, Azerbaijan: Embassy of Azerbaijan in New Delhi, India

Envoy
- Indian Ambassador to Azerbaijan Abhay Kumar: Azerbaijani Ambassador to India Vacant

Azerbaijan–India relations are the bilateral relations between Azerbaijan and India.

Ilham Aliyev and Abhay Kumar

== History ==
India and Azerbaijan have age-old historical relations. The medieval Ateshgah fire temple in the vicinity of Baku, with Devanagari and Gurmukhi wall inscriptions, is a surviving proof of the age-old relationship between the two countries. The trade links with India led to renewed contacts of the Indian merchants heading towards Europe through the Silk Route.

== Political relations ==
During the period when Azerbaijan was a part of the erstwhile Soviet Union, India’s ties with the then Azerbaijan Soviet Socialist Republic were primarily through Moscow. India’s Nobel Laureate Rabindranath Tagore, former President Dr. S. Radhakrishnan (as Vice President in 1956) and former Prime Minister Jawaharlal Nehru (in 1961) visited the Azerbaijan Soviet Socialist Republic.

India recognized Azerbaijan as an independent country in December 1991, soon after it proclaimed its independence from the USSR. Diplomatic relations with Azerbaijan were established on 28 February 1992. The resident Indian Mission was opened in Baku in March 1999. Azerbaijan opened its resident Mission in New Delhi in October 2004.

India-Azerbaijan relations remained friendly. Former Vice President of India, M. Venkaiah Naidu, visited Baku for the NAM Summit from 24-26 October 2019, accompanied by Indian EAM, Dr. S. Jaishankar. More recently, met with Azerbaijani Foreign Minister, Jeyhun Bayramov on the sidelines of 19th NAM Summit in Kampala on 19 January 2024. Former Indian EAM, Sushma Swaraj, visited Azerbaijan from 4-6 Apr 2018 for attending NAM Ministerial Conference and for a bilateral visit. Indian Prime Minister Narendra Modi participated in the online NAM Summit on the theme “United against COVID-19” held at the initiative of Azerbaijani President, on 04 May 2020.

Anupriya Patel, Minister of State from Commerce and Industry visited Baku for the 6th meeting of the Inter-Governmental Commission, held on 25 Oct 2023.

=== 2025 ===
In May, tourism to Azerbaijan faced boycott from Indians after the country publicly supported Pakistan amid escalating tensions following India's Operation Sindoor and 2025 Pahalgam attack, prompting widespread calls in India to cancel travel plans. According to Indian media, MakeMyTrip, cancellations led to a 60% drop in bookings over the course of a week and a 250% surge in cancellations. EaseMyTrip reported a 30% rise in cancellations for Azerbaijan, with many Indian travelers switching to alternative destinations such as Georgia, Serbia, Greece, Thailand, and Vietnam. The calls for boycott on social networks surged after 08 May 2025.

=== 2026 ===
India-Azerbaijan relations have gone through a transformation and reset after Abhay Kumar taking charge as India's 9th Ambassador to Azerbaijan on 3rd February 2026. He was received by the Foreign Minister Jeyhun Bayramov of Azerbaijan on 1st April 2026. His meeting with the foreign minister was followed by the 6th round of Foreign Office/Political consultations between India and Azerbaijan on 3rd April 2026. On 1st September 2026, for the first time in the history of India-Azerbaijan relations, an Indian Prime Minister and an Azerbaijani President met each other, in Bishkek, on the sidelines of SCO summit. Following the meeting between Prime Minister Narendra Modi and President Ilham Aliyev in Bishkek, Indian Ambassador Abhay Kumar was received by President Aliyev on 16th October 2026. Indian External Affairs Minister Dr. S. Jaishankar visited Azerbaijan on 23rd October 2026, a first standalone visit by any External Affairs Minister of India to Azerbaijan.

== Economic relations ==
India's bilateral trade with Azerbaijan has been growing steadily in recent years. India has a well-established pharmaceutical industry in Azerbaijan and many Indian pharmaceutical companies operate out of Azerbaijan. Some items of direct and indirect imports from India include clothes and textiles, information technologies, food items and heavy machinery, electronic cards, steam boilers and other plant equipment.

India remained the seventh largest trading partner for Azerbaijan, with bilateral trade at US$ 1.435 billion.

The volume of trade has increased from 50 million dollars (2005) to 1.8 billion dollars (2024). India's main import from Azerbaijan is crude oil.

=== Key Areas of Economic Interaction ===
- Crude Oil Exports: Crude oil is the cornerstone of Azerbaijan’s exports to India, accounting for about 98% of all Azerbaijani exports to India. In 2023, India was the third-largest buyer of Azerbaijani crude, purchasing around $944 million worth of crude petroleum. This made up roughly 7.6% of Azerbaijan’s total exports.
- Indian Exports to Azerbaijan: India’s exports to Azerbaijan are more diversified, including rice, processed tobacco, broadcasting equipment, pharmaceuticals, electronics, and machinery. Rice alone accounted for $42.3 million in exports in 2023 and made up over 80% of Azerbaijan’s total rice imports.

=== Energy Cooperation ===
India and Azerbaijan have pledged to explore future prospects in the renewable energy sector, energy efficiency and various upcoming projects in oil and gas and pipelines. Indian company GAIL has also signed a memorandum of understanding with the Azerbaijani firm SOCAR to explore business opportunities in petrochemical projects.

ONGC Videsh Ltd has invested more than US$ 1.2 billion in acquiring stakes in the Azeri – Chirag - Gunashli (ACG) oil and gas fields and the Baku – Tbilisi - Ceyhan (BTC) pipe line.

== Gazvin-Rasht-Astara railway route ==
Both sides play a role in constructing the Gazvin-Rasht-Astara (Iran)-Astara (Azerbaijan) railway route as part of the International North–South Transport Corridor. Initially, it is proposed to transport about six million metric tonnes each year and more in the future through this route. It is projected to improve trade relations between Iran and Azerbaijan and at a further stage other countries including India and Russia may also benefit.

== Cultural relations ==
Cultural ties between Azerbaijan and India are close. The eminent Persian poet Nizami Ganjavi was well known from the times of Amir Khusrau, one of the famous poet and music composer in 1800s. Some other important names are Rashid Behbudov, a famous singer who was also the friend of the Indian actor Raj Kapoor. Azeri artist Rashid Behbudov also promoted Azeri music and art in both countries. Elmira Rahimova, an Azeri singer, also studied Indian dance and music while staying in India. Around 30 Indian movies and advertisements have been filmed at various locations in Azerbaijan in the last 4 years.

== Agreements ==
The first bilateral agreement was signed in June 1998. The agreement was the "Economic and Technical Cooperation Treaty" which led to establishment of the Indian-Azerbaijani intergovernmental commission of trade. Other treaties include:

- Economic, Scientific and Technological Cooperation (April 2007)
- Agreement on Air Communication Between the Government of the Azerbaijan and the Government of India (April 2013)
- Agreement on Legal and Judicial Assistance to Civil and Commercial Affairs Between the Republic of Azerbaijan and the Republic of India
- Treaty on Mutual Legal Assistance in Criminal Matters
- Treaty on Deliveries between the Republic of Azerbaijan and the Republic of India
- Protocol on Cooperation Between the Ministries of Foreign Affairs
- Protocol on the Ratification of the Treaty on Legal and Judicial Assistance for Civil and Commercial Affairs

== Tourism ==
Azerbaijan has seen a rapid rise in Indian tourist arrivals in recent years, making India one of its top source markets. In 2023, Azerbaijan received more than 115,000 tourists from India, nearly double the number of arrivals in 2022. India is the fourth largest source of inbound tourists for Azerbaijan after Russia, Türkiye and Iran. Leaving aside the neighbours, India is the largest source of tourists for Azerbaijan. In 2024, approximately 243,000 to 250,000 Indian tourists visited Azerbaijan, up from 60,731 in 2022. The average spending by an Indian tourist in Azerbaijan is reported at 2,170 Azerbaijani Manat (AZN), which is approximately $1,276–$1,280 per visit. This puts Azerbaijan's total annual revenue from Indian tourists in 2024 roughly between $308 million to $311 million.

== See also ==
- Foreign relations of Azerbaijan
- Foreign relations of India
- Romani people in Azerbaijan
- Armenia–India relations
