= Azerbaijan–Brazil relations =

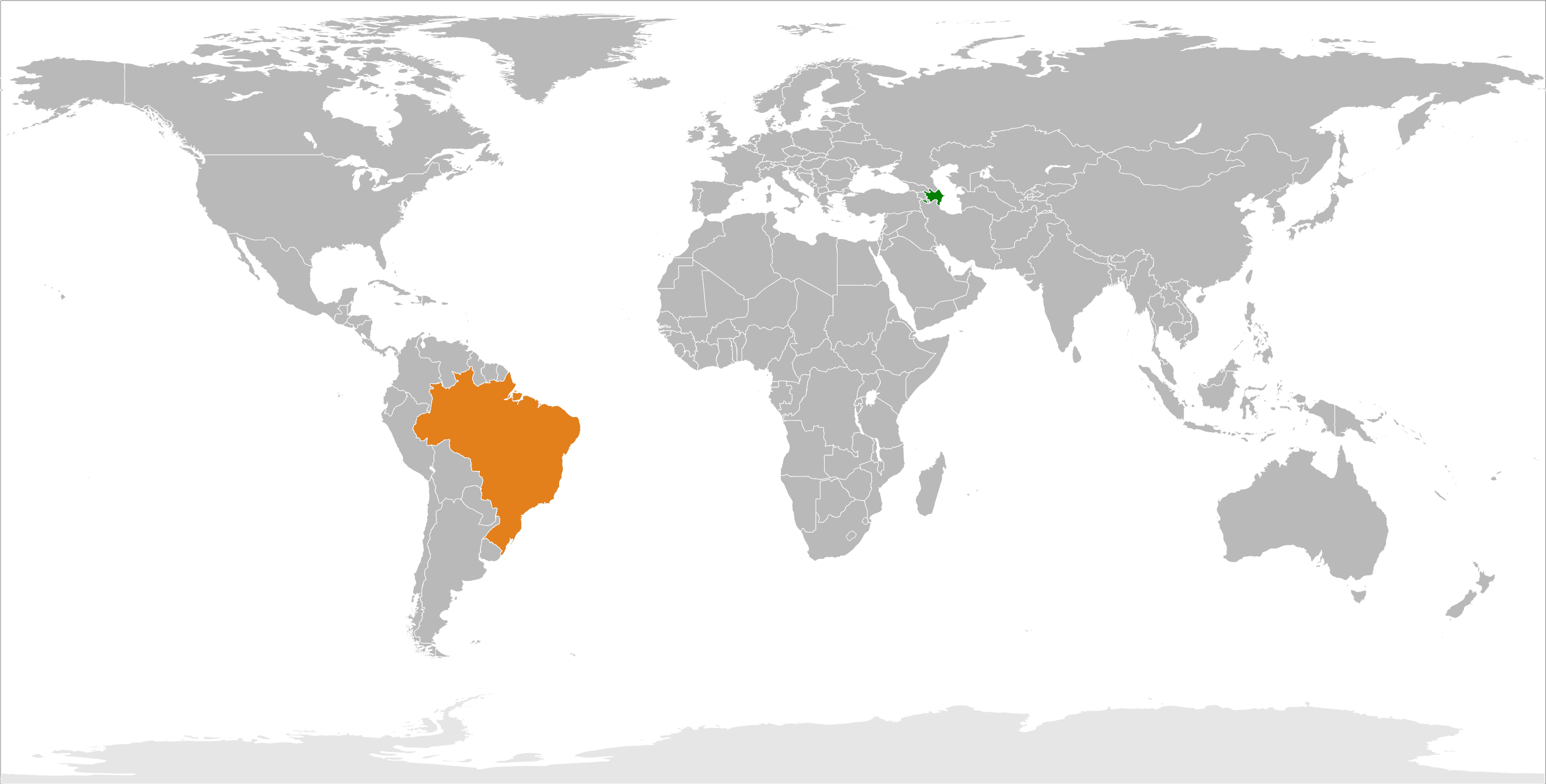

- Azerbaijan: Brazil

Bilateral relations exist between Azerbaijan and Brazil.

== History ==
In December 1991, Brazil recognized the independence of Azerbaijan after the Dissolution of the Soviet Union. In October 1993, both nations established diplomatic relations. In 1995, during the 50th United Nations General Assembly in New York City, Brazilian President Fernando Henrique Cardoso met then Azerbaijani President Haydar Aliyev. In 1997, the chairman of the Supreme Council of Azerbaijan, Rasul Guliyev, visited Brazil to negotiate the purchase of agricultural machinery, sugar, and chicken; development of joint-ventures in the oil sector in the Caspian; the participation in the financing of projects in Azerbaijan and the presence of Brazilian companies in the country.

Brazil opened its embassy in Azerbaijan on June 22, 2009. On February 10, 2012, Elnur Sultanov was appointed Ambassador Extraordinary and Plenipotentiary of Azerbaijan to Brazil. Since 2017, Elkhan Polukhov has been the ambassador of Azerbaijan to Brazil.

== High level visits ==
- In April 2006, Azeri Foreign Minister Elmar Mammadyarov paid a visit to Brazil (and again in 2013). In May 2009, Brazil opened a resident embassy in Baku. In 2012, Azerbaijan opened a resident embassy in Brasília.
- Delegation led by the First Deputy Prime Minister of the Republic of Azerbaijan Yagub Eyyubov attended the UN Conference on Sustainable Development (Rio + 20) in Rio de Janeiro on June 20–22, 2012.
- On February 1, 2013, Foreign Minister Elmar Mammadyarov met with Brazilian Foreign Minister Antonio Patriota within the Munich Security Forum.
- On April 22–26, 2013, the Minister of Youth and Sports of Azerbaijan Azad Rahimov paid an official visit to Brazil.
- In 2013, Foreign Minister Elmar Mammadyarov paid a second visit to Brazil.
- On November 24–27, 2013, Deputy Foreign Minister Araz Azimov held political consultations with Brazilian Deputy Foreign Minister Carlos Paranyos in Brazil.
- Deputy Minister of Foreign Affairs of Brazil Hadil da Roche Viana arrived in Azerbaijan to participate in the IV International Humanitarian Forum held on October 2–3, 2014 in Baku.
- November 5–7, 2014 Brazilian Minister of Sports Aldo Rebelo paid an official visit to Azerbaijan.
- In November 2017, Brazilian Foreign Minister Aloysio Nunes paid a visit to Azerbaijan.
- On May 3–4, 2019, President of the House of Deputies of the Brazilian National Congress Rodrigo Maia paid an official visit to Azerbaijan.

== Inter-parliamentary relations ==
On September 4, 2013, the Brazil-Azerbaijan Friendship Group was established at the Brazilian Chamber of Deputies. The president of the friendship group is MP Claudio Cajado.

On May 27 - June 2, 2013, Nelson Pelegrino, President of the Committee on Foreign Affairs and National Defense of the Chamber of Deputies of the Parliament of Brazil and MP Claudio Cajado and MP Urzeni Rocha visited Azerbaijan to take part in the World Forum on Intercultural Dialogue.

Four deputies, including President of the Brazil-Azerbaijan Friendship Group, Cláudio Cajado, paid a visit to Azerbaijan to attend the 3rd Baku International Humanitarian Forum held October 31-November 1, 2013.

On March 16–18, 2015, members of the National Assembly of the Republic of Azerbaijan Asim Mollazade, Mukhtar Babayev, and Aslan Jafarov paid an official visit to Brazil.

Atila Lins, Chairman of the Foreign Relations Secretariat of the Brazilian Chamber of Deputies visited Azerbaijan on September 15–16, 2015.

On March 5, 2016, an Azerbaijani-Brazilian Working Group was established in the Milli Majlis of the Republic of Azerbaijan. The head of the working group is MP Asim Mollazade.

== Humanitarian issues ==
At the Cultural Center of the Bank of Brazil (Centro Cultural Banco do Brasil), Azerbaijani films were shown in the capital Brazilia (6-11 August 2013), Rio de Janeiro (14-19 August 2013) and San Paolo (4-8 September 2013).

On November 19, 2013, in honor of the 20th anniversary of the establishment of Brazil-Azerbaijan diplomatic relations, a concert was held in the Brazilian capital, led by People's Artist Maestro Yalchin Adigozalov.

On December 11, 2014, the work of the Azerbaijani playwright, playwright Ilyas Afandiyev staged at the Theater of the Rio de Janeiro of the Brazilian Ministry of Culture (FUNARTE).

On November 17 - December 2, 2015, the first screening of Azerbaijani feature films took place at the Santander Cultures Cultural Center in Porto Alegre, Brazil.

On March 9–13 and April 6–11, 2016, Azerbaijan Film Week was held in the Cultural Centers of the Bank of Brazil (CCBB) in São Paulo and Brazilia.

== Agreements ==
In 2016, both nations signed a Memorandum of Understanding on cooperation in trade and investment areas.

== Trade ==
In 2017, trade between Azerbaijan and Brazil totaled US$160 million. Azerbaijan's main exports to Brazil include: industrial fatty acids, oils, and alcohols. Brazil's main exports to Azerbaijan include: meat, tobacco, and machinery. In 2013, Azerbaijan Airlines (AZAL) ordered four E-190 aircraft from Embraer and two E-170 aircraft from ECC Leasing (an Embraer subsidiary). The transaction reached a value of US$230 million.

== Resident diplomatic missions ==
- Azerbaijan has an embassy in Brasília.
- Brazil has an embassy in Baku.

== See also ==
- Foreign relations of Azerbaijan
- Foreign relations of Brazil
