= Azerbaijan–Bangladesh relations =

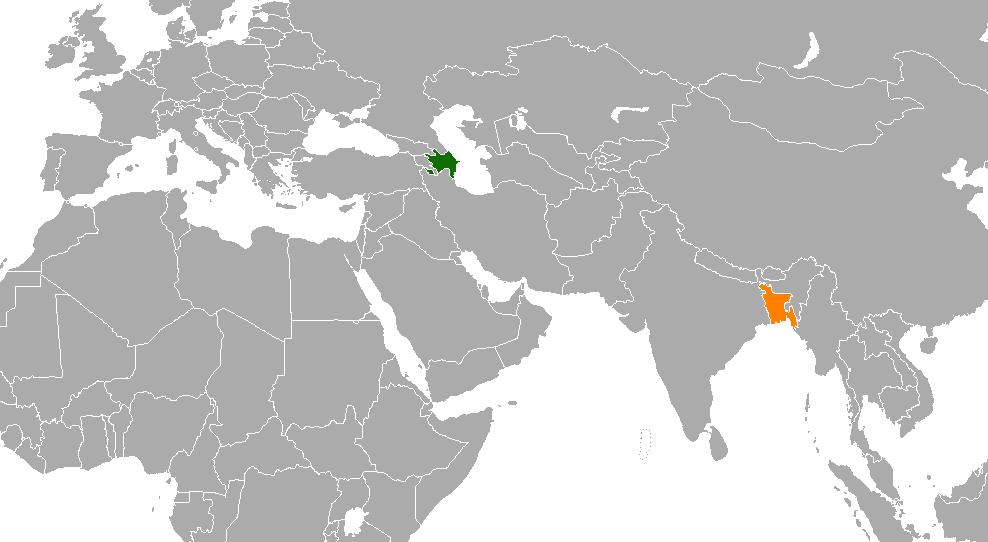

- Azerbaijan: Bangladesh

Bilateral relations exist between Azerbaijan and Bangladesh. Azerbaijan's ambassador to India is also accredited to Bangladesh, while Bangladesh Ambassador to Turkey is accredited as Bangladesh's ambassador to Azerbaijan. Bangladesh supported Azerbaijan in the UN with regard to the Nagorno-Karabakh dispute. Azerbaijan supported Bangladesh on its nomination to International Maritime Organization in 2011.

== History ==
The two nations have had connections for several centuries, particularly due to a commonality through the religion of Islam. During the reign of Sultan Iwaz Shah in 1221, a khanqah was constructed for the Muslim preacher Makhdum Shah in Birbhum (located in West Bengal, India). This construction was facilitated by a man named Ibn Muḥammad al-Marāghī whose ancestors came from Maragheh in present-day Azerbaijan. This suggests that people from Azerbaijan had been migrating to Bengal throughout this period.

Azerbaijan declared its independence on December 30, 1991; on February 26, 1992, Bangladesh became the 13th nation to officially begin diplomatic relations with Azerbaijan.

In 2013, Muhammad Faruk Khan, Minister of Civil Aviation and Tourism of Bangladesh, paid a visit to Baku to participate in the 2nd World Forum on Intercultural Dialogue. Former Foreign Minister of Bangladesh Dipu Moni paid an official visit to Baku in 2013. Moni had an official meeting with the Azerbaijani President Ilham Aliyev. She also held meetings with the Economic Development Minister Shahin Mustafayev and the Chief of State Migration Service Minister Firudin Nabiyev. Dipu Moni's official visit to Baku was termed as a "turning point" in the bilateral relations between Azerbaijan and Bangladesh. Ibrahim Hajiyev, Azerbaijan's ambassador to India, is also accredited to Bangladesh. Bangladesh Ambassador to Turkey, M Allama Siddiki, is also accredited as Bangladesh's ambassador to Azerbaijan.

== Nagorno-Karabakh dispute ==
Bangladesh supported Azerbaijan at the UN with regard to the Nagorno-Karabakh dispute. Bangladesh supports Azerbaijan's position regarding the Khojaly genocide issue.

== Cooperations ==
In 2013, Azerbaijan and Bangladesh signed an MoU relating to cooperation between their respective Foreign Service Academies. Azerbaijan supported Bangladesh on its nomination to International Maritime Organization in 2011. Both countries are members of the Asian Infrastructure Investment Bank initiative.

== Transfer of technology ==
Azerbaijan has expressed interest in transferring its advanced mining technology to Bangladesh.

== Economic relations ==
Azerbaijan and Bangladesh have shown interest in expanding trade and investment. Azerbaijan is keen to import Bangladeshi ready-made garments, pharmaceuticals, leather and ceramics products. Azerbaijan is also interested in the import of labour from Bangladesh in support of infrastructure development efforts. In 2013, the two countries agreed to form a Joint Economic Commission (JEC) "to explore untapped trade, economic and investment opportunities". In 2014, Azerbaijan sent a draft agreement on Trade and Economic Cooperation (TEC) to the Ministry of Commerce, Government of Bangladesh. The agreement will help to "broaden their cooperation involving government bodies operating in the economic fields, professional organisations, business, federations, chambers, regional and local entities." The agreement also calls for increasing "visits, meetings and other interactions between individuals and enterprises of both countries to ensure participation in fairs, business events, seminars, symposia and conferences."

== See also ==
- Foreign relations of Azerbaijan
- Foreign relations of Bangladesh
