= Australia–Azerbaijan relations =

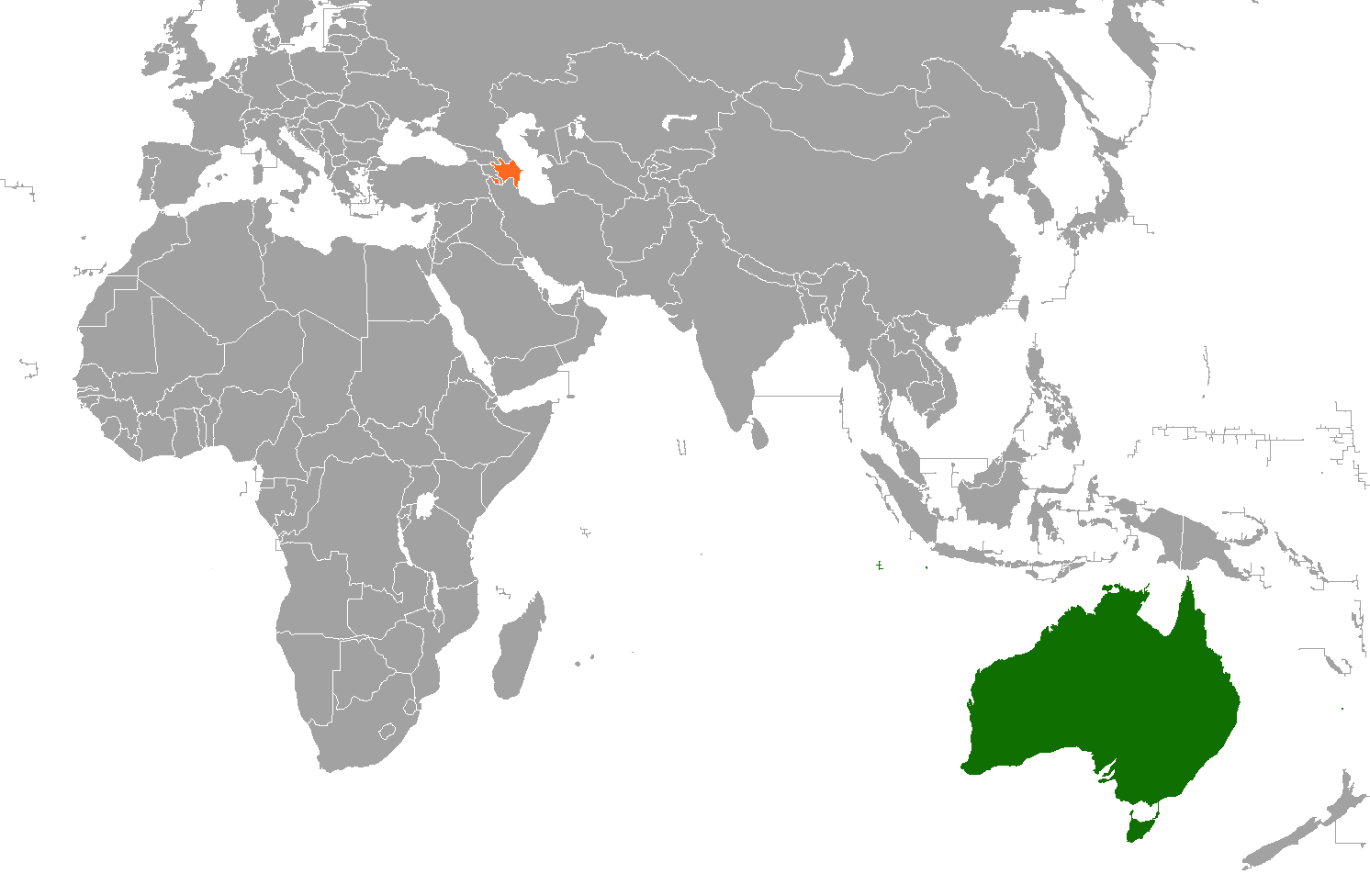

- Australia: Azerbaijan

Australia–Azerbaijan relations refer to bilateral relations between Australia and Azerbaijan. Cooperation is carried out in such areas as construction, tourism, agriculture, finances, investment, media, extractive industry, aerospace, ICT, oil and gas, etc. Australia has a non-resident ambassador in Ankara accredited to Azerbaijan.

== Diplomatic relations ==
The Australian government recognized Azerbaijan's independence on 26 December 1991. Diplomatic relations between the two countries were established on 19 June 1992.

President Ilham Aliyev visited Australia as President of the National Olympic Committee of the Republic of Azerbaijan, on the occasion of the 2000 Summer Olympics in Sydney from 15 September to 1 October 2000. On 6 April 2012, the law on the establishment of the Azerbaijani Embassy in Australia was adopted. The Azerbaijani Embassy in Australia was opened in June 2013. In December 2015, the government of Australia stated its support towards the territorial integrity of Azerbaijan.

== Inter-parliamentary relations ==
On 8 April 2011, a working group on inter-parliamentary relations between Azerbaijan and Australia was established in the Milli Majlis of Azerbaijan. The head of the working group is Khanlar Fatiev. In February 2009, the Deputy of the Milli Majlis of Azerbaijan Sabir Rustamhanly visited Australia.

== Economic cooperation ==
In 2012, the trade turnover between the two countries amounted to 100 million US dollars. The basis of exports to Azerbaijan is butter, while the basis of exports to Australia is oil. In June 2015, the heads of the State Oil Company of Azerbaijan (SOCAR), Caspian Marine Services, and the Australian shipbuilding company Austal signed a $34 million contract to build a 70-meter, high-speed passenger vessel to operate in the Caspian Sea. This will be used to deliver cargo and passengers to SOCAR and British Petroleum (BP) platforms.

In August 2016, a meeting between members of the Azerbaijani parliamentary delegation and Australian MPs was held in the Australian Parliament building. During the meeting, Australia's interest in operating transport routes that pass through the territory of Azerbaijan, as well as in joining the Great silk road project, was noted.

In October 2017, a delegation consisting of Australian entrepreneurs visited Azerbaijan for the first time. On the same days, the first Azerbaijani-Australian business forum was held with the participation of agents of more than 30 Australian companies.

In October 2017, the management of the State Oil Fund of Azerbaijan (SOFAR) expressed its readiness to purchase real estate in Australia.

According to the data of the State Customs Committee of Azerbaijan, during the first eight months of 2017, the mutual trade turnover amounted to 3,715 million US dollars. Exports to Australia were 470,000 US dollars, and exports to Azerbaijan were 3,245 million US dollars.

Since December 2017, companies from both countries have been negotiating the export of pomegranate juice from Azerbaijan to Australia.

There is a chamber of Commerce of Azerbaijan in Australia, which is chaired by Nizami Jafarov.

A number of Australian companies, such as RiverBank Estate (wine production), Foster Wheeler (engineering), etc. are interested in investing in Azerbaijan.

Azerbaijan has Australia's assistance in the development of gas fields.

Trade turnover (in US dollars)

Year	Trade turnover	Import	Export
2014	4936.6	4609.8	326.8
2015	9719	9105,3	613,7
2016	7996.5	7815,3	181,2
2017	5531.2	4961,5	569,7
2018	4519.2	4089,3	429,9

== International cooperation ==
In the international arena, cooperation between the two states is carried out within the framework of various international organizations: the UNESCO World Heritage Committee (in particular on the protection of the Great Barrier Reef), The United Nations (peacekeeping operations in Afghanistan), NATO (the program called «Partnership for Peace»; the Australian government has invested approximately 50 thousand US dollars to clear unexploded ordnance on the territory of the Aghstafa district).

Azerbaijan supports Australia's candidacy for membership in the UN Human Rights Council for 2018–2020.

== Tourism ==
On 8 December 2012, a Memorandum of understanding on air traffic was signed.

In September 2015, during a meeting of the inter-parliamentary delegation of Azerbaijan with the mayor of Perth-Lisa Skafidi, the importance of opening direct flights between the capital cities of Baku and Canberra was noted.

In January 2019, the parties discussed the prospects for cooperation in the field of tourism.

== Cultural ties ==
A memorandum of cooperation was signed between the head of the National University of Australia and Azerbaijani music schools. As part of the student exchange program, currently 35 students from Azerbaijan are studying in higher education institutions in Australia. On 17 October 2016, an event on the occasion of the 25th anniversary of Azerbaijan's independence was held in Perth on the initiative of the Australia-Azerbaijan friendship Society.

== Other areas ==
The parties also cooperate in the field of environmental protection. In November 2014, the head of the organization IDEA (international dialogue for the protection of the environment) Leyla Aliyeva visited Australia to get acquainted with the country's biological diversity, as well as to exchange experience.

The Azerbaijani company Global Service Provider (GSP) is scheduled to start operating in Australia.

Cooperation between "Azercosmos" and the Australian Space Agency is underway.

== Assistance ==
In May 2005, at the initiative of the Australian Ministry of Defence, special equipment, as well as compact laboratories, were sent to Azerbaijan to search for and neutralize anti-personnel mines within the framework of the Partnership for peace program.

According to the order of the Cabinet of Ministers of Azerbaijan, in February 2020, the government of Azerbaijan provided material assistance to Australia in the amount of 50 thousand US dollars to eliminate the impact of forest fires on the territory of the country.

== Resident diplomatic missions ==
- Azerbaijan has an embassy in Canberra.
- Australia is accredited to Azerbaijan from its embassy in Ankara, Turkey.

== See also ==
- Foreign relations of Australia
- Foreign relations of Azerbaijan
