= Azerbaijan–Uruguay relations =

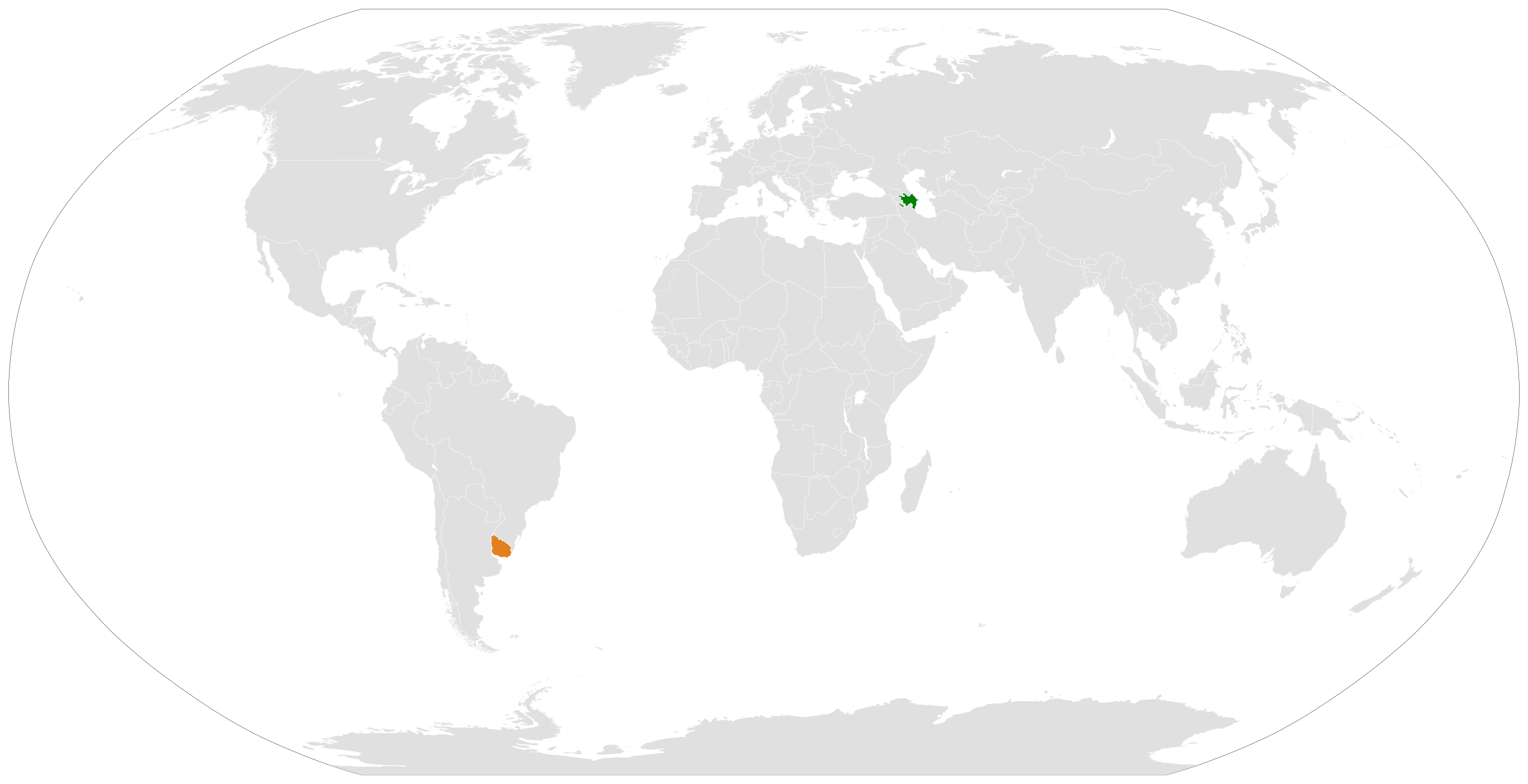

- Azerbaijan: Uruguay

Diplomatic relations exist between Azerbaijan and Uruguay. Neither country has a resident ambassador.

== History ==
In 1991, Azerbaijan gained independence after the Dissolution of the Soviet Union on 26 December 1991. On 12 January 1995, Azerbaijan and Uruguay established diplomatic relations. In September 2011, a Uruguayan Delegation paid a visit to Azerbaijan to celebrate the 20th anniversary of Azerbaijani independence. In July 2012, Azeri Foreign Minister Elmar Mammadyarov paid an official visit to Uruguay and met with President José Mujica.

In November 2012, a diplomatic crisis between both nations occurred when an Uruguayan Parliamentary Delegation on a visit to Armenia crossed the border into Armenian held territory of Nagorno-Karabakh within Azerbaijan. Fearing that Uruguay would recognize Nagorno-Karabakh as part of Armenia; Azerbaijan launched a formal complaint against Uruguay accusing the Parliamentary Delegation of illegally crossing into Azerbaijan and jeopardizing a future peace agreement. The Uruguayan government has never officially recognized the Armenian-held territory as an integral part of Armenia.

In January 2013, Azerbaijani President Ilham Aliyev received an official Delegation from Uruguay in order to improve relations between both nations. In 2016, the Uruguayan government expressed its concerns on the escalation of violence in Nagorno-Karabakh.

In May 2013, former Uruguayan President Luis Alberto Lacalle paid a visit to Azerbaijan to participate in the Southern Caucasus Forum being held in Baku. Former President Lacalle was received by President Ilham Aliyev. In 2014, Azerbaijan opened a diplomatic office in Montevideo.

In May 2019, the Minister of Foreign Relations of Uruguay, Rodolfo Nin Novoa, paid a visit to Azerbaijan, on the occasion of the 5th World Forum on Intercultural Dialogue. There he met with President Ilham Aliyev; with the Minister of Foreign Affairs, Elmar Mammadyarov; with the economy minister, Shahin Mustafayev; and with the Minister of Agriculture, Inam Karimov.

In May 2022, Deputy Foreign Minister Elnur Məmmədov paid a visit to Uruguay.

== Agreements ==
Both nations have signed several bilateral agreements such as an Agreement on Cooperation between the Ministries of Foreign Affairs of both nations (2007); Agreement on the elimination of visa requirements for official and diplomatic passport holders (2013); Agreement on Customs Cooperation (2016) and an Agreement on Cultural Cooperation (2017). On 20 May 2025, Azerbaijan and Uruguay signed a Memorandum of Understanding (MoU) to enhance academic collaboration and curriculum exchange between ADA University and the Artigas Foreign Service Institute. Signed by Uruguayan Director General of Foreign Affairs Andrés Peláez and Azerbaijani Ambassador Ramzi Teymurov, the agreement coincided with the 30th anniversary of bilateral diplomatic relations between the two nations.

== Trade ==
In 2016, trade between Azerbaijan and Uruguay totaled US$7.6 million. Uruguay's main trade products to Azerbaijan are cattle and pharmaceuticals. Azerbaijan does not export products to Uruguay. In 2024, bilateral trade between Azerbaijan and Uruguay totaled approximately $86.7 million, consisting heavily of Azerbaijani exports valued at $86.5 million, composed entirely of crude petroleum, compared to $235,000 in exports from Uruguay, which primarily included iron pipes ($120,000), non-fillet frozen fish ($52,400), and rice ($42,900).

== Resident diplomatic missions ==
- Azerbaijan has a diplomatic office in Montevideo.
- Uruguay is accredited to Azerbaijan from its embassy in Tehran, Iran.

== See also ==
- Foreign relations of Azerbaijan
- Foreign relations of Uruguay
- Demographics of Uruguay
