= Azerbaijan–Ecuador relations =

Bilateral relations

- Azerbaijan: Ecuador

Bilateral relations exist between the Republic of Azerbaijan and the Republic of Ecuador in the political, socio-economic, cultural and other spheres. Azerbaijan has a non-resident ambassador in Brasília. Ecuador's ambassador to Ankara, Turkey, is accredited to Azerbaijan.

== Diplomatic relations ==
Diplomatic relations between Azerbaijan and Ecuador were established on March 22, 2004.

== High-level visits ==
In November 2010, Azerbaijan's permanent representative to the UN, Agshin Mehdiyev, paid an official visit to Ecuador.

In October 2011, the Minister of Foreign Affairs, Trade and Integration of Ecuador, Riccardo Panigno Armando Arocan, paid an official visit to Baku. The Minister met with President of Azerbaijan Ilham Aliyev, Prime Minister Artur Rasizade, Chairman of the Milli Majlis Ogtay Asadov and Foreign Minister Elmar Mammadyarov. At the end of the meeting, the Ministries of Foreign Affairs of both countries signed an agreement of intent on cooperation.

During the official visit of the Foreign Minister of Ecuador Maria Fernanda Espinosa to Baku in April 2018 to participate in the conference of Ministers of the Non-Aligned Movement, there were negotiations held with Ilham Aliyev. An agreement on cooperation in the energy sector was reached.

In May 2019, Elkhan Polukhov paid a working visit to Ecuador. The Ambassador met with the president of the committee on sovereignty, integration, foreign policy and internal security of the National Assembly of Ecuador, Fernando Flores Vazquez. Prospects for bilateral cooperation were discussed.

== Economic cooperation ==
In 2009, a delegation of Ecuadorian entrepreneurs arrived in Baku. They discussed the production and export of special equipment for cold storage, banana gassing, and flower growing technologies.

According to statistics from the UN Trade Office (COMTRADE), in 2014, the volume of exports of machinery and mechanical devices from Azerbaijan amounted to 1.68 thousand US dollars.

According to statistics from the UN Trade Office (COMTRADE), in 2019, the volume of flower exports from Ecuador amounted to 3.91 million US dollars.

== International cooperation ==
The Government of Ecuador recognizes the territorial integrity of Azerbaijan.

Ecuador supports Azerbaijan's position in the UN Security Council.

== See also ==
- Foreign relations of Azerbaijan
- Foreign relations of Ecuador
