= Azerbaijan–Senegal relations =

- Azerbaijan: Senegal

Diplomatic mission
- Embassy of Azerbaijan: Embassy of Senegal, Baku

Envoy
- Ambassador: Ambassador Cheikh Gueye

Diplomatic relations were established between Azerbaijan and Senegal in 1996.

== Diplomatic relations ==
On 14 March 1996, a protocol on the establishment of diplomatic relations between Azerbaijan and Senegal was signed.

According to the order of the president of Azerbaijan Ilham liev No. 2587 dated 11 December 2012, the extraordinary ambassador of Azerbaijan to Senegal is Tariq Ismail oglu Aiyev.

It is planned to open the Embassy of Senegal in Azerbaijan.

== High-level visits ==
From 29 to 31 January 2008, a delegation headed by the Secretary-General of the Secretariat of the President of Senegal and the Executive Director of the National Agency of the OIC, A. Balden, visited Azerbaijan. One of the main goals of the visit was to present an invitation to the XI OIC Summit, which was held on 13–14 March 2008 in Dakar to Ilham Aliyev.

On 13–15 October 2009, a delegation led by the technical adviser of the Ministry of Senegal, Mame Balla Mbake, visited Azerbaijan to participate in the VI Conference of the Ministers of Culture of the OIC member States in Baku.

Within the framework of the event, Mame Balla Mbake was received by Ilham Aliyev together with the heads of delegations of the OIC member States.

Babacar Thiam, Director General of the Department of travel and public security of Senegal, paid a visit to Azerbaijan to participate in the second meeting of the Ministers of Labor of the Organization of Islamic Cooperation member States, held on 23–26 April 2013 in Baku.

== Economic cooperation ==
On 18–19 May 2016, during the official visit of the delegation of the State Customs Committee (SCC) of Azerbaijan, headed by its chairman Aydin Aliyev, to Senegal, an Agreement on mutual assistance in strengthening the capacity of customs officers was signed.

=== Imports and exports ===
Imports of Azerbaijan
Year	Amount Thousands of USD
2020	0,26
2021	0,19 ▼
2022	1,08 ▲

Exports of Azerbaijan
Year	Amount Thousands of USD
2020	44,90
2021	393,75 ▲
2022	60,93 ▼

== Cultural ties ==
On 12 November 2014, the Minister of Culture and Tourism of Azerbaijan, Abulfas Garayev, met with the Minister of Culture of Senegal, Serine Mamadou Bousso Leye. They discussed the prospects for enhancing cooperation between the two states in the field of culture.

== International cooperation ==
In the international arena, cooperation between the two states is carried out within the framework of various international organizations, such as the UN or the OIC.

In March 2008, the government of Senegal supported the position of Azerbaijan in the vote on the draft resolution "On the situation in the occupied territories of Azerbaijan", which is currently on the UN agenda.

== See also ==
- Foreign relations of Azerbaijan
- Foreign relations of Senegal
