= Azerbaijan–Syria relations =

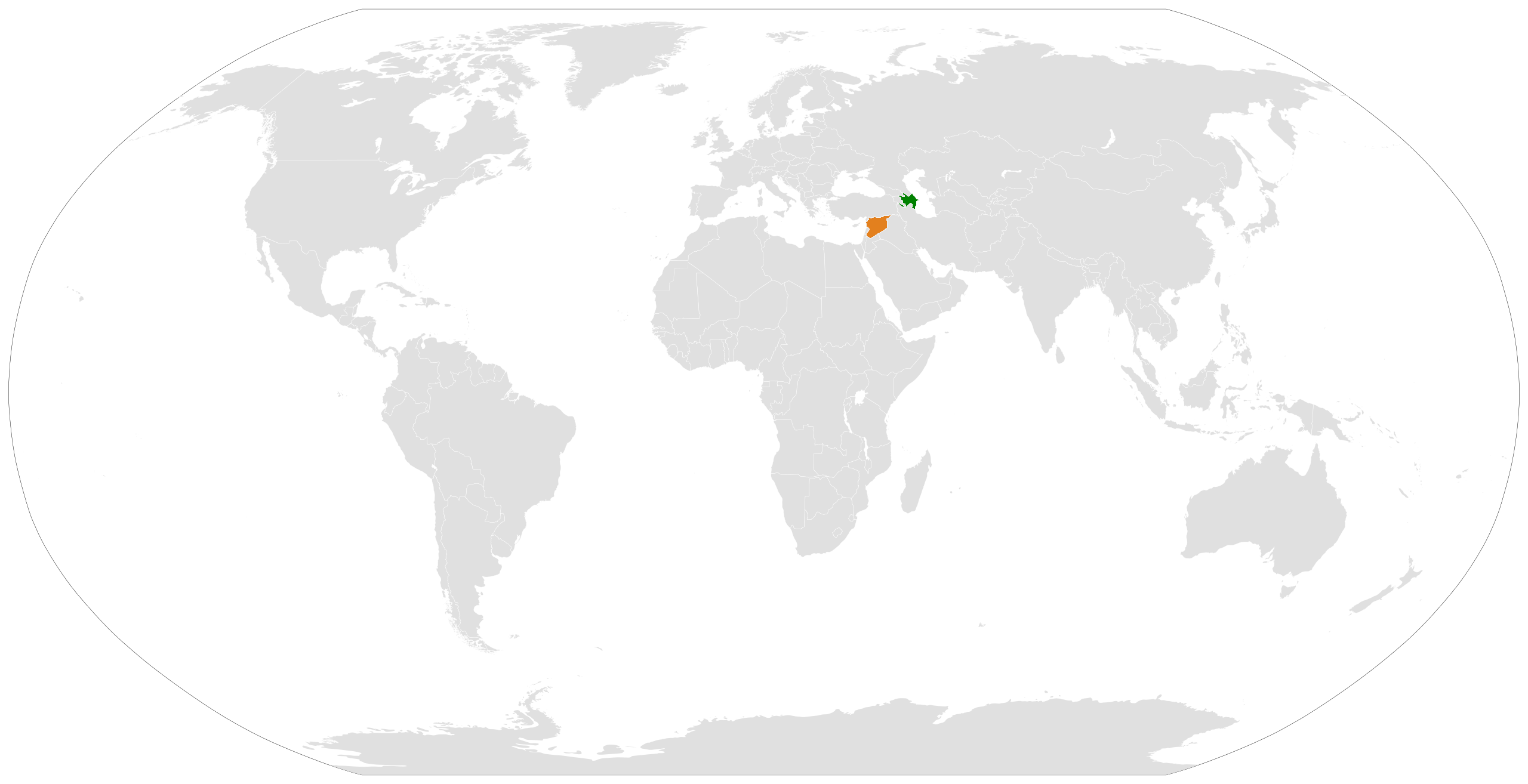

- Azerbaijan: Syria

Diplomatic relations between the Republic of Azerbaijan and Syria were established on 28 March 1992. Syria is accredited to Azerbaijan from its embassy in Tehran, Iran.

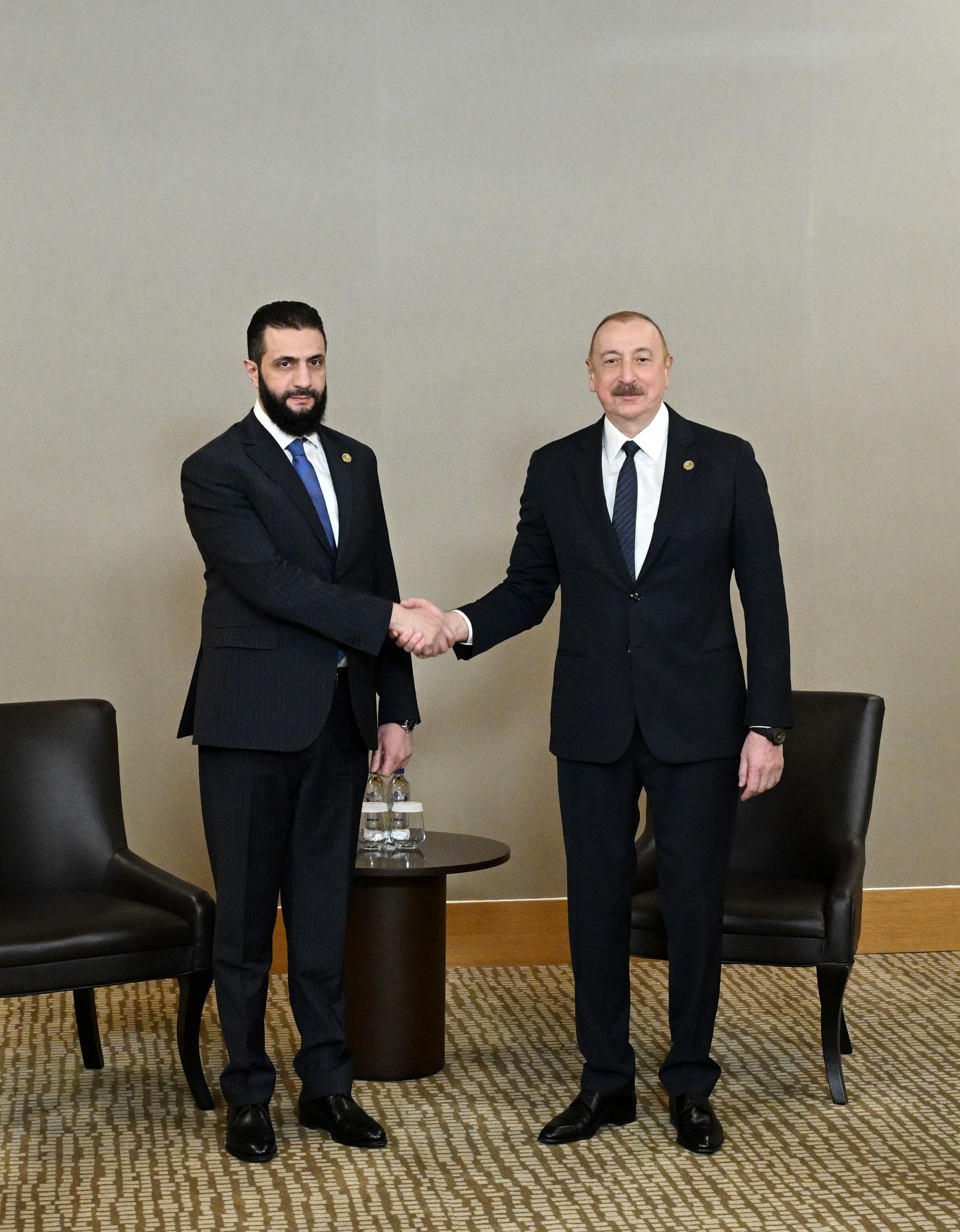
Syrian President Ahmed al-Sharaa with Azerbaijani President Ilham Aliyev, 11 April 2025

== Diplomatic relations ==
On 9 July 2009, the first official visit of the President of the Syrian Arab Republic — Bashar al-Assad to Azerbaijan took place. The parties agreed to supply 1-1.5 billion cubic meters of Azerbaijani gas to Syria.

A joint Azerbaijani-Syrian business forum was held during the visit. The business forum resulted in the signing of 14 documents:

1. "Memorandum of understanding on cooperation between the chamber of shipping of Syria and the State Maritime administration of the Republic of Azerbaijan»;
2. "Memorandum of mutual cooperation between the Azerbaijan National Library named after M. F. Akhundov and the al-Asad Library of the Syrian Arab Republic»;
3. "Memorandum of understanding between the Ministry of Agriculture of the Republic of Azerbaijan and the Ministry of Agriculture and Agrarian reforms of the Syrian Arab Republic on cooperation in the field of agriculture»;
4. "Protocol of intent on cooperation between the Ministry of internal affairs of the Republic of Azerbaijan and the Ministry of internal affairs of the Syrian Arab Republic»;
5. "Memorandum of understanding between the Ministry of industry and energy of the Republic of Azerbaijan and the Ministry of industry of the Syrian Arab Republic on industrial cooperation»;
6. "Agreement between the Ministry of healthcare of the Republic of Azerbaijan and the Ministry of health of the Syrian Arab Republic on cooperation in the field of health»;
7. "Agreement between the Ministry of culture and tourism of the Republic of Azerbaijan and the Ministry of tourism of the Syrian Arab Republic on cooperation in the field of tourism»;
8. "The agreement between the Ministry of education of the Republic of Azerbaijan and the Ministry of higher education Syrian Arab Republic on cooperation in the field of higher education"
9. "The agreement between the Ministry of education of the Republic of Azerbaijan and the Ministry of education of the Syrian Arab Republic on cooperation in the field of secondary education»;
10. "Agreement between the government of the Republic of Azerbaijan and the government of the Syrian Arab Republic on cooperation in the field of information and communication technologies»;
11. "Agreement between the government of the Republic of Azerbaijan and the government of the Syrian Arab Republic on mutual assistance and cooperation in the field of customs Affairs»;
12. "Memorandum of understanding on political consultations between the Ministry of foreign affairs of the Republic of Azerbaijan and the Ministry of foreign affairs of the Syrian Arab Republic»;
13. "Memorandum of understanding between the government of the Syrian Arab Republic and the government of the Republic of Azerbaijan in the field of electricity and renewable energy»;
14. "Cooperation Agreement between the Ministry of Finance of the Republic of Azerbaijan and the Ministry of Finance of the Syrian Arab Republic".

Since the fall of the Assad regime in 2024, relations between the two countries have significantly improved. In July 2025, Azerbaijani president Ilham Aliyev and Syrian president Ahmed al-Sharaa met in Baku, where they agreed to restore ties and deepen cooperation, such as in the energy sector.

== Economic cooperation ==
In September 2009, the two governments signed an agreement to eliminate double taxation.

During the talks between the Minister of industry and energy of Azerbaijan Natig Aliyev and the Minister of industry and energy of Syria Sufyan Allau, which were held in the capital city of Damascus on 4 March 2010, a Memorandum of intent was signed to conclude an agreement on gas supplies. There was also a Protocol signed on the mutual exchange of experience, training of qualified personnel, and the establishment of a joint Azerbaijani-Syrian company.

On 23 November 2010, the parties entered into an agreement on the technical details of the purchase of natural gas for a period of 20 years.

In December 2011, Azerbaijan began exporting natural gas to Syria via Turkey and Georgia.

The Azerbaijani government plans to allocate approximately 5–10 billion dollars for investment in the Syrian economy.

In 2018, it was announced that the chairmen of Azerbaijani companies wish to participate in various tenders, the main purpose of which is the reconstruction of oil and gas pipelines, roads, etc. on the territory of Syria.

The two countries cooperate in a number of areas: energy, mining, agriculture, tourism, trade, science, education, health, ecology, construction, and so on.

== International cooperation ==
Syria has once supported Azerbaijan's position on the Nagorno-Karabakh conflict. However, since the Syrian Civil War, Syria has been supporting Armenia, Azerbaijan's arch-rival.

Both countries are members of the Organization of the Islamic Conference (OIC), although Syria is suspended since 2012. Syria and Azerbaijan cooperate within the framework of the United Nations (UN), Non-Aligned Movement (NAM), etc.

== Cultural ties ==
Since the twentieth century, the two countries have been cooperating in book publishing. The society for friendship and cultural relations operates in Damascus.

== Humanitarian assistance ==
On 7–18 December 2015, with the financial support of the International Development Agency of the Republic of Azerbaijan (AIDA) and the organization of the Embassy of the Republic of Azerbaijan in Jordan, humanitarian aid was distributed to 400 Syrian families settled in Jordan, including food and health products.

== See also ==
- Foreign relations of Azerbaijan
- Foreign relations of Syria
