= Azerbaijan–Indonesia relations =

- Azerbaijan: Indonesia

Diplomatic mission
- Embassy of Azerbaijan, Jakarta: Embassy of Indonesia, Baku

Azerbaijan–Indonesia relations refers to the current and historical bilateral relations between Azerbaijan and Indonesia.

== Chronology of political relations ==
- 1991 - Indonesia officially recognizes Azerbaijan's independence.
- 1992 - Official diplomatic relations are established between Azerbaijan and Indonesia.
- 2006 - Azerbaijan opens its first Southeast Asian embassy in Jakarta.
- 2008 - Indonesian FM Hasan Virayuda visits Azerbaijan officially.
- 2010 - Indonesia opens its embassy in Baku.
- 2012 - Azerbaijani Parliament Chairman Ogtay Asadov visits Indonesia.
- 2013 - Indonesian House Speaker Marzuki Alie visits Azerbaijan.
- 2013 - Both countries support each other in international forums, including Indonesia supporting Azerbaijan on the Nagorno-Karabakh issue.
- 2016 - Indonesia reaffirms support for Azerbaijan’s territorial integrity and stance on Nagorno-Karabakh.
- 2018 - Indonesian Regional Council Chairman Oesman Sapta Odang visits Azerbaijan for the Milli Majlis 100th anniversary.
- 2025 - Both Azerbaijan and Indonesia are members of the Asian Development Bank, Organization of Islamic Cooperation and Non-Aligned Movement.
- 2025 - House Speaker Puan Maharani meets with Azerbaijan’s President Ilham Aliyev in Baku. Aliyev agrees to send special teams to Indonesia for cooperation in economy, defense, culture, and education.

== Economic relations ==
- 2007 - Bilateral trade between Azerbaijan and Indonesia reaches $101,100,000.
- 2011 - Trade increases to $1,760,000,00 with Azerbaijan as Indonesia’s 2nd largest oil supplier, after Saudi Arabia.
- 2016 - Hatta Rajasa highlights Azerbaijan’s rapid development and emphasized economic cooperation with Indonesia.
- 2025 - The Azerbaijan-Indonesia trade balance favours the former due to oil exports.
- 2025 - President Aliyev invites Indonesian companies to participate in Nagorno-Karabakh reconstruction projects.

== Military relations ==
- 2025 - Azerbaijan and Indonesia propose defense cooperation, including joint exercises, information exchange, and participation in defense expos.

== Cultural relations ==
- 2010 - The Azerbaijan University of Languages establishes the Center of Indonesian Studies.
- 2012 - The AUL and the Indonesian Embassy in Baku hold a batik workshop and exhibition with a Javanese designer.
- 2016 - Messoud Efendiyev meets Indonesian Tourism Minister Arief Yahya and the Minister of Education and Culture Anies Baswedan, to discuss collaboration on tourism and culture.
- 2021 - Azerbaijan allocates $50,000 in aid to Indonesia for the West Sulawesi earthquake relief.
- 2025 - Educational collaboration and capacity-building initiatives are proposed.

== Diplomatic missions ==
- The Embassy of Republic of Indonesia in Baku, Azerbaijan
- Azerbaijan Embassy in Jakarta, Indonesia
