= Misir Mardanov =

Azerbaijani politician & academic (born 1946)

- Misir Mərdanov
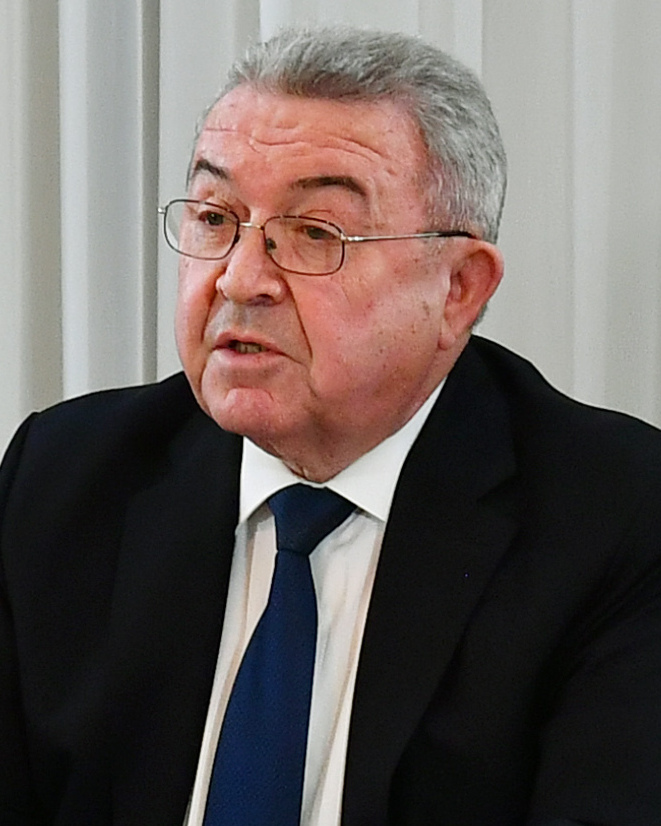
- Mardanov in 2022

AMEA Institute of Mathematics and Mechanics Director
- Incumbent
- Assumed office 19 April 2013

Minister of Education of the Republic of Azerbaijan
- Incumbent
- Assumed office 25 March 1998 – 19 April 2013

Rector of Baku State University
- Incumbent
- Assumed office 1996 – 25 March 1998

Personal details
- Education: Baku State University

Misir Jumayil oglu Mardanov (born October 3, 1946) is a member of ANAS (2017), director of the AMEA Institute of Mathematics and Mechanics, former Minister of Education of Azerbaijan, doctor of physical and mathematical sciences and university professor.

== Pedagogical activity ==
Between 1973 and 1998, he gave lectures on analytical geometry, differential geometry, mathematical methods of optimal control at the BSU Faculty of Mechanics and Mathematics. He also lectured and conducted seminars in specialist courses on optimal management and supervised students' diploma studies.

== Socio-political activity ==
He was a member of the Board of Directors of the New Azerbaijan Party until 2013 and a member of the Political Council of the New Azerbaijan Party until 2020.

== Rewards ==
In 2011, by the order of the President of the Republic of Dagestan, he was awarded the honorary title "Honored Scientist of the Republic of Dagestan" for his great contributions to the development of scientific cooperation between the Republics of Dagestan and Azerbaijan.

In 2021, he was awarded the 1st degree "For Service to the Motherland" order.
