= Nəsimi =

Nəsimi may refer to:

- Nəsimi, Bilasuvar, Azerbaijan
- Nəsimi, Sabirabad, Azerbaijan
- Nəsimi raion, a settlement and raion of Baku, Azerbaijan

== See also ==
- Nasimi (disambiguation), including uses of Nesimi
