= Azerbaijani diaspora =

Communities living outside Azerbaijan

Total population
- 1.5–5 million (2002)

Regions with significant populations
- Russia: 603,070
- Turkey: 530,000–2 million
- Georgia: 233,178
- Kazakhstan: 114,586
- Ukraine: 45,176
- Uzbekistan: 44,400
- Turkmenistan: 33,365
- United States: 24,377
- Germany: 20,000–30,000
- Netherlands: 18,000
- Kyrgyzstan: 17,823
- France: 70,000
- Canada: 9,915
- Portugal: 8,000
- United Arab Emirates: 7,000
- United Kingdom: 6,220
- Belarus: 5,567
- Sweden: 2,935
- Latvia: 1,567–2,032
- Australia: 1,036
- Austria: 1,000
- South Korea: 608
- Brazil: 181

Languages
- Predominantly Russian, Azerbaijani, English, Kazakh, Uzbek, Turkmen and others

Religion
- Predominantly: Islam (mainly Shia Islam); Minorities: Christianity, Judaism, Irreligious

Related ethnic groups
- Turkish people and Turkmen people

The Azerbaijani diaspora are the communities of Azerbaijanis living outside the places of their ethnic origin: Azerbaijan and the Iranian region of Azerbaijan. The total number of the Azerbaijani diaspora varies by sources, however, at least 1.5–5 million Azeris live outside of Iran and Azerbaijan.

According to Ethnologue, there were over 1 million Azerbaijani-speakers of the north dialect in southern Dagestan, Armenia, Estonia, Georgia, Kazakhstan, Kyrgyzstan, Russia, Turkmenistan and Uzbekistan as of 1993. Other sources, such as national censuses, confirm the presence of Azerbaijanis throughout the former Soviet Union. The Ethnologue figures are outdated in the case of Armenia, where the Nagorno-Karabakh conflict has affected the population of Azerbaijanis. Ethnologue further reports that an additional 1 million Iranian Azerbaijanis live outside Iran, but these figures most likely are a reference to the Iraqi Turkmen, a distinct though related Turkic people. The number of Azerbaijanis around the world is estimated about 30-35 million people, only 10,180,770 of which are in Azerbaijan and another 13-30 million in Iran.

== Azerbaijanis in North America ==
The Azerbaijani diaspora in the United States and Canada was established in the mid-to-late 20th century. The Azerbaijanis have settled in the North, Central and Southern parts of the U.S. and in all major Canadian cities. The majority of Azerbaijanis have settled in the states of California, New Jersey, New York, Michigan, Pennsylvania, Texas and District of Columbia. Most Azerbaijanis living in the U.S. are migrants from Iran.

There are several organizations connecting Azerbaijani Americans as well as Azerbaijani Canadians.

=== US Azerbaijanis Network – USAN ===
The US Azerbaijanis network combines all Azerbaijani, Turkish and other Diaspora and community organizations of USA, groups, societies, coalitions, networks associations and clubs. Purpose of this network is to bring together Azerbaijani-American potential electorate. Activity of USAN is to inform voters about the voting process and voter registration, to provide their participation in the American political debate, to enhance their participation in the vote and to increase voter turnout. Executive Director of the American Azerbaijanis Network (USAN) is Adil Bagirov and it was founded in 2007.

=== Azerbaijan America Alliance ===
Azerbaijan America Alliance is a non-governmental organization. Its mission is to help form an atmosphere of mutual understanding and respect between the peoples of Azerbaijan and America. The 20th anniversary of the Khojaly genocide was held in February 2012, which is the one of its most significant events. Demonstration of posters and banners in the streets of New York and Washington, D.C., statements by U.S. Congressmen, presentation of films about the Khojaly genocide and other events were all a part of the commemoration. One page each in The Washington Post and The New York Times were dedicated to the Khojaly genocide.

=== Azerbaijan Society of America ===
Azerbaijan Society of America which is the first Azerbaijani-American community organization was established in 1957 in New Jersey, USA by Naghi Sheykhzamanli. His granddaughter Tomris Azari is current chairman of the American Azerbaijanis Society. As well as, Tomris is deputy chairwoman of the Coordinating Council of the World Azerbaijanis. She was awarded the "Order of Glory" by Ilham Aliyev in 2006.

=== United States-Azerbaijan Chamber of Commerce ===
The U.S.-Azerbaijan Chamber of Commerce (USACC) was established in 1995. Its mission is to help the establishment of long-term business ties between Azerbaijan and America. It was a main driving force for the Baku-Tbilisi-Ceyhan oil pipeline and the Baku-Tbilisi-Erzurum gas pipeline. USACC provides the improvement of network services between governmental and non-governmental entities, business organizations of the US and Azerbaijan.

=== Azerbaijani – American Council (AAC) ===
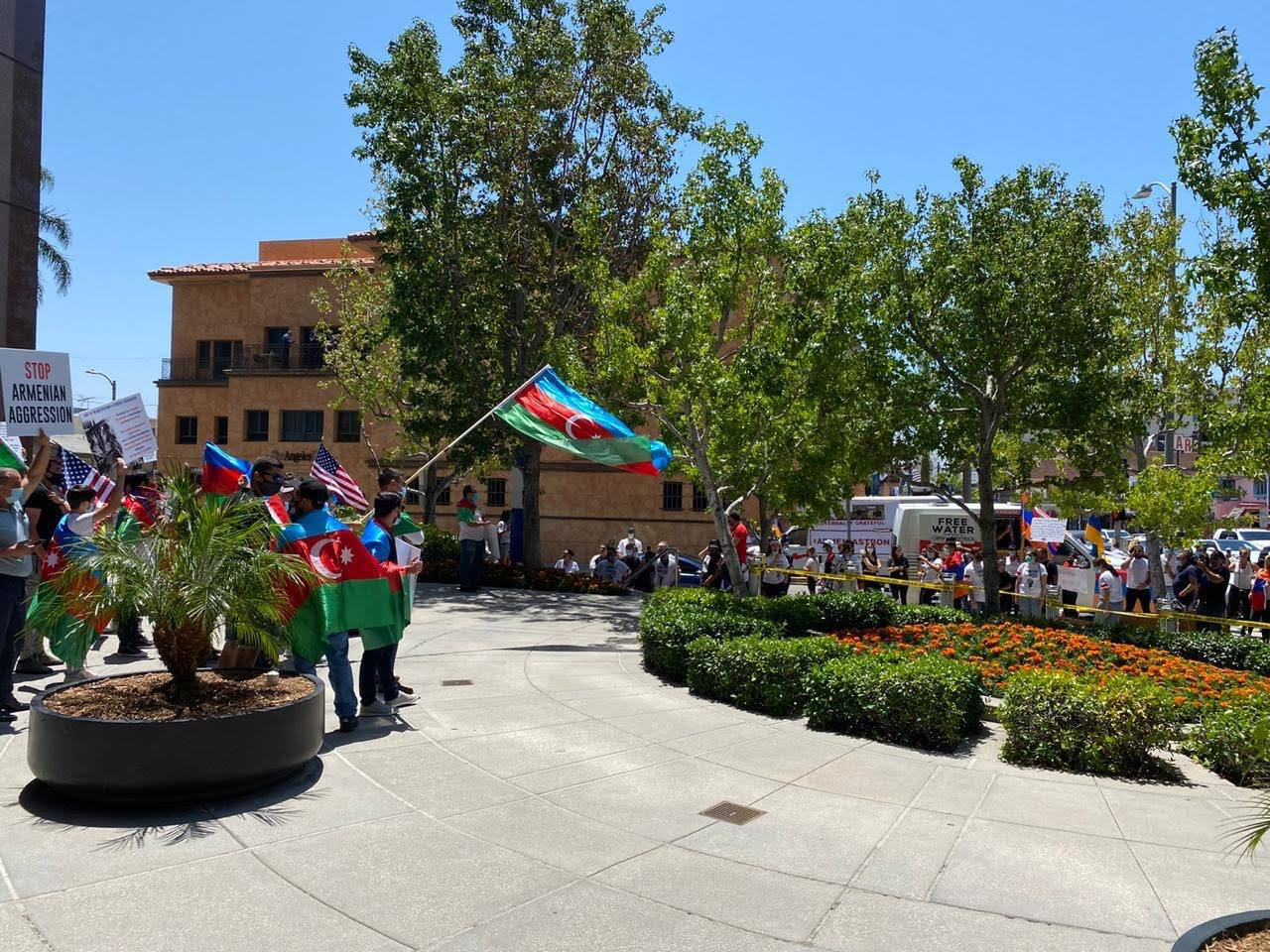
Azerbaijani protests in Los Angeles

The council has been operating in Washington since 1994. The organization arranges series of events, exhibitions and seminars in research centers related to Azerbaijani culture. The members of the organization send statements and letters to the president, all state delegates, senators, congressmen, as well as to the press, about the Khojaly Massacre, March days, the Nagorno-Karabakh conflict between Armenia and Azerbaijan as well as other issues. The American-Azerbaijani Council was registered in 2006 as a non-governmental organization. The council is the largest Azerbaijani organization operating in California. The purpose of the council is to bring together ideas of Azerbaijanism, to present these ideas through educational and cultural programs. The Council regularly organizes forums. Azerbaijani students studying in California and people doing a research about Azerbaijan are invited to the forum and economic, political and technological issues are discussed in this forums. American-Azerbaijan Council has a representative office in Texas. The president of the American-Azerbaijani Council is Javid Huseynov.

=== Network of Azerbaijani Canadians (NAC) ===
The Network of Azerbaijani Canadians (NAC, French: Réseau des Canadiens Azerbaïdjanais, Azerbaijani: Kanadalı Azərbaycanlılar Şəbəkəsi) is a fully community-funded and the largest grassroots Azerbaijani advocacy organization in Canada. Founded in 2020, the organization advocates on behalf of Azerbaijani Canadians in matters of public policy. The organization is based in Toronto; board members and organization members are spread across Canada including Ottawa, Edmonton, Calgary, Montreal and Vancouver. The Network of Azerbaijani Canadians is a registered non-profit and managed by its board of directors. Nika Jabiyeva is the executive director of NAC, appointed by the organization's board of directors.

=== Association of Washington State Azerbaijanis (AWSA) ===
Association of Washington State Azerbaijanis is an Azerbaijani association in the United States.

== Azerbaijanis in Asia ==
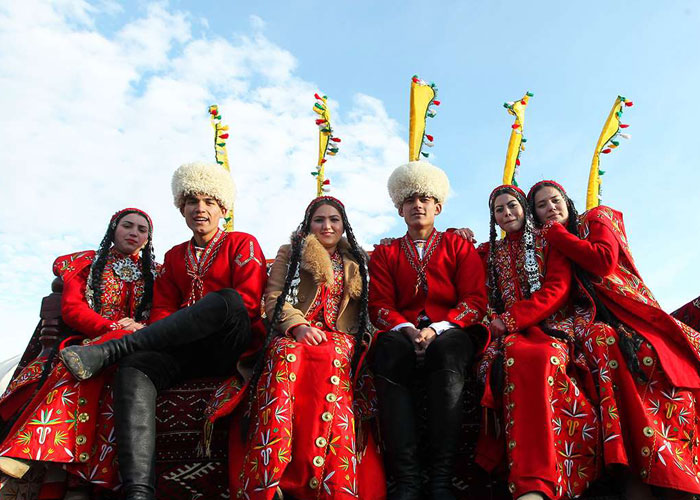
Azerbaijanis in Iran. Iranian Azerbaijan, also known as South Azerbaijan, is considered to be the primary home of Azerbaijanis

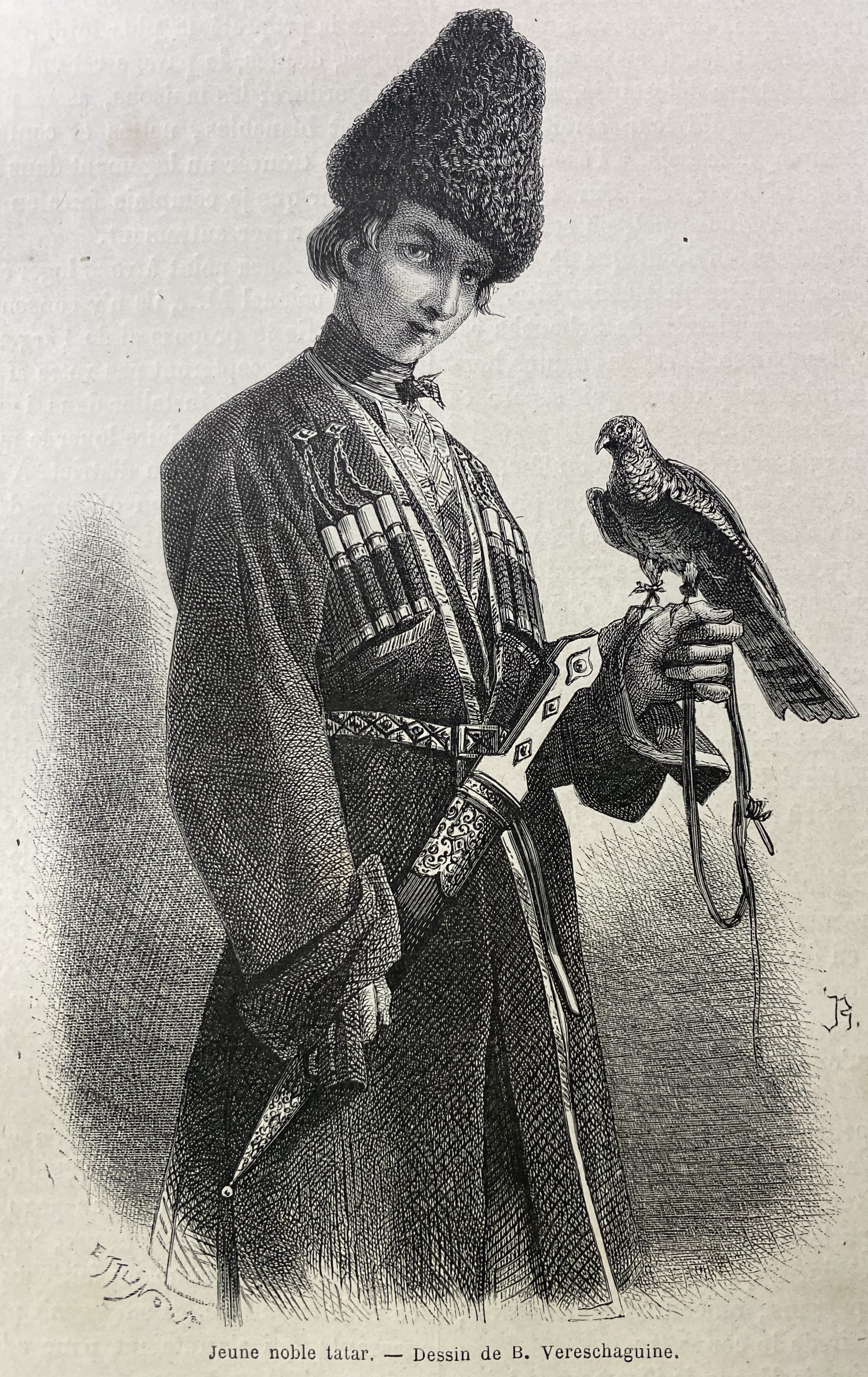
"Young noble Tatar," Shusha, 1865

Apart from Iran and the Republic of Azerbaijan itself, Azerbaijanis in Asia primarily live in Central Asia, in countries such as Uzbekistan, Kazakhstan, Kyrgyzstan and Turkmenistan.

Up until 1917, a sizable minority of Azerbaijanis also lived within Armenia. The Russian census of 1897 recorded 300,000 Azeris (Tatars) living within the Erivan Governorate (corresponding to Iğdır Province of Turkey, Azerbaijan's Nakhchivan and central modern-day Armenia, but excluding southern and northern Armenia). During the Armenian–Azerbaijani War (1918–1920), 135,000 Azeris were displaced from the Erevan district. In the corresponding timeframe, Azerbaijani inhabitants of the region would be subjected to ethnic cleansing from the Armenian side, resulting in massacres and deportations of the population. In addition, Stalin's population transfer policies resulted in the deportation of 100,000 Azeris from the Armenian SSR between 1930 and 1952.

Many Azerbaijanis are assumed to be involved in the Basmachi movement, a Turkic uprising which was led by Enver Pasha against the Russian Republic and later Bolsheviks, inspired by Islamic beliefs. The presence of Azerbaijanis in Turkmenistan is believed to date back to early twentieth century, while Azerbaijani migration to Kyrgyzstan began in 1929-1930 and 1940s-1950s in Kazakhstan. Another primary reason why Azeris may reside in the region is the Soviet-era labour migration, which could have also affected Turkic populations of South Caucasus. There are approximately 220,000 Azerbaijanis living in Central Asia. Prominent Central Asians of Azerbaijani origin include: Hajibala Abutalybov, Stalik Khankishiev, Rafael Fiziev, Elnur Hüseynov and others.

In the present-day, besides Central Asia, a sizeable population of Azerbaijanis also live in East Asia. The ancestors of Azerbaijanis have had a historical presence in the Far East (East Asia) and the Gobi-Manchurian steppe since the formation of the Göktürk Khaganate (552–744 CE), a Turkic state that spanned from the territories of Goguryeo to Greater Caucasus. Although there are no official numbers of Azerbaijani nationals in the People's Republic of China, reports of the Republic of Korea state that there are 608 Azeris living in the country, of which about 200 of them are university students. Statistics on foreign residents of Japan have reported 166 Azerbaijanis residing in the country. However, there are also estimates that 30,000 Azerbaijanis currently reside in China and some 10,000 in Japan. Korean nationals of Azerbaijani descent represent a small community. While some have acquired South Korean citizenship through marriage, others have done so by pursuing higher education. Azerbaijanis in Korea are particularly prominent in the business sector, with many employed by major Korean corporations. Additionally, a significant number are engaged in roles within governmental organizations. Influx of Azerbaijanis to East Asia may be explained by the economic prosperity of the nations in the region. Economic opportunities and academic endeavors are among many factors that can attribute to migration to the region.

== Azerbaijanis in Europe ==
=== The Federation of Turkish-Azerbaijani Associations ===
The Federation of Turkish-Azerbaijani Associations was established in 2004 in Kocaeli. The Heydar Aliyev Park was opened in the Kartepe municipal area on the eve of the World Azerbaijanis Solidarity Day in 2010 as a result of the activity of Turkish-Azerbaijani Associations Federation. Another park in Derince was put into operation on 29 November 2011. A chairman of Turkey-Azerbaijan Federation of Associations is Bilal Dundar.

=== Azerbaijani Youth Union of Russia ===
The Azerbaijani Youth Union of Russia was established on 18 April 2009 in Moscow. Its purpose is to protect the Azerbaijan national cultural values, support of Azerbaijani youth, better integration of Azerbaijani youth into the cultural life of Russian society and the development of education. Its central office is located in Moscow and there are several regional offices in the north and west of Russia, Volga area, North Caucasus, Far East and Siberia. The chairwoman is Leyla Aliyeva.

== Organizations ==
The State Committee of Azerbaijan Republic on Work with Diaspora was established to handle the communication with the diaspora and to drive the creation of new societies and organizations. In 2004 the committee effected the creation of about 40 new Azerbaijani communities worldwide.

== Current number of Azerbaijanis in select countries ==
| Rank | Country | Official figures | Current est. Azerbaijanis population | No. of Azerbaijanis | List of Azerbaijanis by country |
|---|---|---|---|---|---|
| 1 | Iran | | 17,500,000+ | Azerbaijanis in Iran | List of Iranian Azerbaijanis |
| | Azerbaijan | ± 9,713,655 |
| 2 | Russia (Including Temporary Population) | 603,070 (Census 2010) | 1,500,000 to 3,000,000 | Azerbaijanis in Russia | List of Russian Azerbaijanis |
| 3 | Turkey | | 80,000 to 4,500,000 (claimed by the Diaspora Committee of Azerbaijan, factual accuracy disputed) (Note: "However, as of today, no fully reliable statistics exists. According to the non-official information provided by the Diaspora Committee of Azerbaijan, about 4,500,000 Azerbaijanis live in Turkey. It is not clear however what criteria have been used for the calculation, and how many generations of Azerbaijanis as well as which population categories are included in the statistics. Even OECD data are not always reliable.") | Azerbaijanis in Turkey | List of Turkish Azerbaijanis |
| 4 | Georgia | 284,761 (2002) | 360,000 (2007) | Azerbaijanis in Georgia | List of Georgian Azerbaijanis |
| 5 | Kazakhstan | 85,292 (2009) | 150,000 | Azerbaijanis in Kazakhstan |
| 6 | Germany | 15,219 (2006) | 200,000 | Azerbaijanis in Germany |
| 7 | Ukraine | 45,176 (2001) | 50,000 | Azerbaijanis in Ukraine |
| 7 | Netherlands | 9,049 (2022) | 18,000 (2009) |
| 8 | Kyrgyzstan | 17,267 (2009) | | Azerbaijanis in Kyrgyzstan |
| 9 | United Kingdom | | 6,220 (2013) | Azerbaijanis in the United Kingdom |
| 10 | United States | 14,205 Republic of Azerbaijan(2000) – 40,400 Iranian Azerbaijanis | 400,000 | Azerbaijani American | List of Azerbaijanian Americans |
| 11 | Canada | 9,915 (2021) | 80,000 | Azerbaijani Canadian |
| 12 | France | | 1,112 (asylum-seekers), 70,000 | Azerbaijanis in France |
| 13 | Uzbekistan | 44,410 (1989) | | Azerbaijanis in Uzbekistan |
| 14 | Turkmenistan | 33,365 (1989) | | Azerbaijanis in Turkmenistan |
| 15 | United Arab Emirates | 7,000 (2015) |
| 16 | Belarus | 5,567 (2009) | | Azerbaijanis in Belarus |
| 17 | Latvia | 1,567–2,032 (2023) |
| 18 | Estonia | 880 (2000) |
| 19 | Lithuania | 788 |
| 20 | Tajikistan | 800 (2000) |
| 21 | Australia | 1,260 |
| 22 | Austria | 1,159 |
| 23 | South Korea | 608 |
| 24 | Denmark | 231 |
| 25 | Japan | 166 |
| 26 | Armenia | no data available | | Azerbaijanis in Armenia | List of Armenian Azerbaijanis |
| 27 | Portugal | 68 | 8,000 |
| World | | 36,676,818 – 40,437,848 |

== See also ==
- State Committee on Work with Diaspora of Azerbaijan Republic
