= Nasimi (disambiguation) =

Imadaddin Nasimi (1369–1417) was an Azerbaijani Ḥurūfī poet.

Nasimi or Nesimi may also refer to:

== Places ==
- Nasimi, Bilasuvar, Azerbaijan, a village
- Nasimi, Sabirabad, Azerbaijan, a village
- Nasimi raion, a settlement and raion of Baku, Azerbaijan
- Nasimi (Baku Metro), a railway station in Baku, Azerbaijan

== People ==
- Kul Nesîmî (fl. 17th century), Ottoman Alevi-Bektashi poet in Anatolia
- Nasimi Aghayev, Azerbaijani diplomat

== Other uses ==
- Nesimi (film), a 1973 Azerbaijani biographical drama about Imadaddin Nasimi

== See also ==
- Nəsimi (disambiguation)
