= Congress of World Azerbaijanis =

Pan-Turkist Organisation

Congress of World Azerbaijanis Dünya Azərbaycanlılarının Qurultayı
- Date: 2001, 2006, 2011, 2016, 2022
- Location: Azerbaijan
- Country: Azerbaijan

The Congress of World Azerbaijanis or World Azerbaijani Congress (WAC, Dünya Azərbaycanlılarının Qurultayı) is a pan-Turkist organization that reconvenes every five years. It was founded in 2001 in Baku, the capital of the Republic of Azerbaijan, by decree of former president Heydar Aliyev. It was founded to present the Republic of Azerbaijan as the homeland of the entire Azerbaijani diaspora.

While Ilham Aliyev has attempted to dismiss claims that his government is taking any anti-Iranian ethnic nationalist positions, the Iranian government and groups like Iranian nationalist circles, especially Iranian Azerbaijanis, are dubious about the intentions of the Azerbaijani government due to the ongoing actions of irredentist elements like the Congress of World Azerbaijanis and the support that they receive from Azerbaijani authorities, both state and non-state.

The Azerbaijani government has occasionally invited Iranian separatist pan-Turks to attend the Congress' meetings, including members of the South Azerbaijan National Liberation Movement (SANLM). In the April 2022 edition held in Shusha, such Turkey-based separatists were invited to attend the event. Earlier, in 2008, under the influence of strong Iranian objections, they were not invited. In 2023, they were once again invited by the Azerbaijani government.

== 1st Congress of World Azerbaijanis ==
The 1st Congress of World Azerbaijanis was held in Baku on 9–10 November 2001 under the Decree No. 724 of the Azerbaijani President dated May 23, 2001. Members of the World Azerbaijanis Coordinating Council were determined at the congress and Heydar Aliyev was elected as Chairman of the council. At the congress, the goal of a united Azerbaijan was proclaimed as its main objective.

=== Participants ===
406 delegates and 63 guests participated in the First Congress of World Azerbaijanis, representing more than 200 organizations consisting of Azerbaijanis living in 36 foreign countries. Participants of the conference were representatives of US, Turkey, Russia, Great Britain, Canada, Germany, France, Georgia, Austria, Romania, Switzerland, Australia, Uzbekistan, Ukraine, Estonia, Latvia, Moldova, Kazakhstan, Denmark, Netherlands, Finland, Belarus, Israel and other countries. The Congress of Azerbaijan was represented by 702 delegates from 25 political parties and 844 guests from more than 130 different state and public organizations, scientific, educational, cultural and other creative organizations.

=== During the congress ===
On November 9, 2001, Heydar Aliyev, made a speech on the first working day of the congress. He talked about the measures being taken to strengthen the state independence of Azerbaijan and the forthcoming tasks. President Heydar Aliyev spoke about the national unity and solidarity, to strengthen relationship between Azerbaijan and world Azerbaijanis, to preserve and develop Azerbaijani language and national-moral values.

Representatives of the United States, Great Britain, France, Germany, Georgia, Uzbekistan, Russia, Turkey and Ukraine, as well as representatives from St. Petersburg, spoke at the congress, saying that they share the views of the Azerbaijani leader.

The Congress continued its work in eight committees - Human Rights and International Relations, Native Language and study, Science and Education, Culture, Economic Relations, Youth and Sport, Issues to overcome Armenia's aggression against Azerbaijan, Mass Media and Information Exchange Commissions.

The congress accepted documents on November 10, named Resolution of the I Congress of World Azerbaijanis, application of representatives of I Congress of World Azerbaijanis to the all Azerbaijanis, application of participants of the I Congress of World Azerbaijanis to the international community, international organizations, heads of state and parliaments of foreign countries related to the Nagorno-Karabakh conflict of the Armenian-Azerbaijan, application of representatives of I Congress of World Azerbaijanis to Haydar Aliyev, application of the representatives of the I Congress of World Azerbaijanis to the American people on terrorist acts committed on September 11, 2001, in the United States.

The congress elected the Coordinating Council for World Azerbaijanis consisting of 103 people and its managerial staff with 23 people, the chairman of the managerial staff and its four deputies .

=== Accepted documents ===
5 documents have been accepted at the First Congress of World Azerbaijanis:

- "Resolution of the First Congress of World Azerbaijanis"
- "Application of the First Congress of World Azerbaijanis to all world's Azerbaijanis"
- “Application of participants of the I Congress of World Azerbaijanis to the international community, international organizations, heads of state and parliaments of foreign countries related to Nagorno-Karabakh problem of the Armenian-Azerbaijan”
- “Application of representatives of I Congress of World Azerbaijanis to Haydar Aliyev “
- “Application of the representatives of the I Congress of World Azerbaijanis to the American people on terrorist acts committed on September 11, 2001 in the United States.”

== II Congress of World Azerbaijanis ==
II Congress of World Azerbaijanis was held in Baku on March 16, 2006, according to the Decree of the Azerbaijani President dated February 8, 2006, #1291 named "Conducting II Congress of World Azerbaijanis".

At this congress, Ilham Aliyev was elected as Chairman of the Coordinating Council for World Azerbaijanis.

=== Participants ===
Overall 1231 delegates were elected to the II Congress of World Azerbaijanis. 593 delegates and 388 guests from 49 foreign countries attended this meeting. Moreover, 638 delegates and 625 guests from 27 state and government institutions, public organizations, scientific, educational, cultural institutions and creative organizations of the Republic, political parties were represented at the congress.

64 guests including the members of the highest legislative bodies of foreign countries - Turkey, Latvia, Estonia, Lithuania, Ukraine, Moldova, Belgium, Austria, Switzerland, and Canada participated in Congress.

Resolution of II Congress of World Azerbaijanis, the appeal of the II Congress of World Azerbaijanis to the Ilham Aliyev, the appeal of the representatives of the II Congress of World Azerbaijanis to the all Azerbaijanis, the appeal of participants of the I Congress of World Azerbaijanis to the international community, international organizations, heads of state and parliaments of foreign countries related to Nagorno-Karabakh conflict of the Armenian-Azerbaijan, the appeal of the UN to Educational, Scientific and Cultural Organization (UNESCO), the appeal to the Azerbaijani and Turkish Diaspora organizations were accepted at Congress. Finally, the organizational issues were reviewed.

The congress approved the new content of the Coordinating Council of World Azerbaijanis consisting of 109 people and the managerial staff consisting of 23 members. Azerbaijani President Ilham Aliyev unanimously was elected as Chairman of the Coordinating Council of World Azerbaijanis.

A group of diaspora activists were awarded to the Order of Glory and Taraggi medal for their contribution to the solidarity of the World Azerbaijanis by order of the Azerbaijani President.

The congress's resolutions and discussions were described by organisers as reflecting a shared political outlook among Azerbaijani communities worldwide, framed around the concept of "Azerbaijanism" as a unifying national identity. The resolution also addressed proposals for joint activities between Azerbaijani and Turkish diaspora organisations.

The coordinating of activities of the Azerbaijani and Turkish diaspora organizations and the systematic implementation of cooperation in this field are one of the main tasks of the new stage. The II Congress of World Azerbaijanis showed that the whole Azerbaijanis of the world were in the same position in solving Nagorno-Karabakh conflict between the Armenian and Azerbaijan. In the resolutions and speeches at congress, the support of the activity of Ilham Aliyev on returning the occupied territories and in the solving of this problem was provided by world Azerbaijanis equivocally.

== III Congress of the World Azerbaijanis ==
According to the "Action Plan on the Twentieth Anniversary of the Restoration of the State Independence of Azerbaijan" approved by the Decree of the Azerbaijani President dated January 21, 2011 No.1293 named "About the III Congress of the World Azerbaijanis" was held in Baku on 5–6 July 2011.

=== Participants ===
Overall 1272 delegates with 579 representatives and 211 guests from 42 countries attended the congress. Most of the delegates were from Russia - 155 people, as well as Turkey 101, Ukraine 49, Germany 43, Georgia 41, USA 28, Sweden 23, Netherlands 21, Israel 17, Uzbekistan 13, France 12, UK 11, Canada 10 people. There were no representatives within 15 million Azerbaijanis living in Iran.

182 representatives of the Congress were heads of Azerbaijani communities and associations operating in foreign countries. Representatives from all regions of Azerbaijan participated in the congress. 677 delegates and 405 guests from state and government structures, non-governmental organizations, scientific, educational, cultural and other creative organizations and political parties of the Azerbaijan attended the congress. Totally, 37 deputies from parliament of 13 countries participated in the congress. 37 people from 21 foreign countries, as well as 163 representatives of the local operating mass media attended this conference in our country.

There were representatives of Jews, Russians, Ukrainians, Bulgarians, Turks and other people among the participants of the Third Congress of World Azerbaijanis who have migrated from Azerbaijan to abroad.

=== Summary ===
At the end of the Third Congress of World Azerbaijanis a number of decisions were made. Among the accepted documents there are the general application of the Congress, application of congress to the world Azerbaijanis and to foreign parliaments about the Nagorno-Karabakh conflict.

The issue on the reorganization of the World Azerbaijanis Coordinating Council was accepted to be by the way of voting. The Congress decided to continue the activity of Council. The Presidium of the council was abolished and the Executive Secretariat was established. Ilham Aliyev has been appointed as Chairman of the World Azerbaijanis Coordinating Council as well as Chairman of the State Committee for Work with Diaspora, and Nazim Ibrahimov was elected as executive secretary. The number of Coordinating Council members has been increased from 107 to 115.

== IV Congress of World Azerbaijanis ==
IV Congress of World Azerbaijanis was held on 3–4 June 2016.

=== About ===
The official opening ceremony of the IV World Congress of World Azerbaijanis took place at the Heydar Aliyev Center in Baku on June 3, 2016. More than 500 representatives and guests of different diasporas from 49 countries participated in the Fourth Congress of World Azerbaijanis. There were influential politicians, public figures, scientists and high-ranking officials from several countries, members of the parliament among the guests, who are known for their friendly relationship between foreign countries and Azerbaijan. Along with the invited guests from abroad, the 360-member delegation from various state and government structures, non-governmental organizations, representatives of science, education, culture and other creative organizations and political parties participated at the Congress.

=== At the congress ===
Azerbaijani President Ilham Aliyev attended the opening ceremony of the congress and made a speech. Then, the conference continued with panel discussions and debate on youth, information warfare and other topics.

Participants accepted the resolution of the congress, appeal to President Ilham Aliyev on behalf of the Congress delegates, to world Azerbaijanis, to the international community on behalf of congress representatives, to international organizations, heads of states and parliaments of foreign countries related with the Armenian-Azerbaijani conflict over Nagorno-Karabakh region and appeal of the congress to the UN International Atomic Energy Agency, the European Union and the international community related with the activities of the ‘’Metsamor’’ Atomic Power Station in Armenia.

Afterwards, the new content of the World Azerbaijanis Coordinating Council was approved. The congress participants unanimously elected the President Ilham Aliyev as chairman of the World Azerbaijanis Coordinating Council one more time.

The content of the Coordinating Council at the Congress was confirmed by 109 people. The Chairman of the State Committee on works with Diaspora Nazim Ibrahimov has been elected as Executive Secretary of the council.

The plenary of the State Committee for Work with Diaspora has been presented to the leaders of diaspora organizations due to active participation at the end of Congress.

== See also ==
International Solidarity Day of Azerbaijanis

== Sources ==
- Ahmadi, Hamid (2016). "The Clash of Nationalisms: Iranian Response to Baku's Irredentism". In Kamrava, Mehran (ed.). The Great Game in West Asia: Iran, Turkey and the South Caucasus. Oxford University Press. pp. 102–140. ISBN 978-0190673604.
