= List of Georgian Azerbaijanis =

This is a list of notable people of Georgian Azerbaijani descent.

== Art ==
Number	Name	Image	Background
1	Abdulla Shaig		poet and writer
2	Geysar Kashiyeva		considered the first professional female painter in Azerbaijani history
3	Khadija Gayibova		first Azerbaijani female pianist
4	Movsun Sanani		film and theater actor, People's Artist of Azerbaijan SSR (1949)
5	Niyazi		musical conductor, composer, author of the famous "Rast" symphonic mugam, People's Artist of USSR (1959), Hero of Socialist Labor
6	Rashid Behbudov		Azerbaijani singer and actor, People's Artist of USSR (1959), Hero of Socialist Labor
7	Shovkat Mammadova		first Azerbaijani opera singer
8	Govhar Gaziyeva		Azerbaijani actress
9	Okaber		Azerbaijani rapper

== Politicians ==
Number	Name	Image	Background
1	Ali Tagi-zadeh		People's Commissar of Social Welfare and Labour of the Armenian SSR (1929–1932), Chairman of the Supreme Soviet of Azerbaijan SSR (1959–1963)
2	Alimardan Topchubashov		politician, foreign minister and Minister of External Affairs of Azerbaijan Democratic Republic (1918), Head of the Parliament in absentia of Azerbaijan Democratic Republic (1918–1920)
3	Huseyngulu Mammadov		politician, member of Constituent Assembly of Georgia, from Social Democratic Party of Georgia.
4	Hasan Hasanov		first Prime Minister of Azerbaijan (1990–1992), Minister of External Affairs of Azerbaijan (1993–1998)
5	Hasan Seyidov		Chairman of the Council of Ministers of Azerbaijan SSR (1981–1989)
6	Nariman Narimanov		Azerbaijani and Soviet politician and writer, People's Commissar for Foreign Affairs of Azerbaijan SSR (1920–1921), Chairman of the Council of People's Commissars of the Azerbaijan SSR (1920–1922)
7	Raul Usupov		Georgian politician, ex-deputy governor of Kvemo Kartli
8	Ramiz Hasanov		Chairman of State Committee on Standardization, Metrology and Patents of Azerbaijan Republic
9	Zakir Garalov		Prosecutor General of Azerbaijan
10	Peri-Khan Sofiyeva		Georgian deputy of Azerbaijani origin, the first Muslim woman to become a deputy, deputy of the Democratic Republic of Georgia (1918-1920)

== Military ==
Number	Name	Image	Background
1	Abdulhamid bey Gaytabashi		Major-General of Azerbaijan Democratic Republic
2	Hasan bey Agalarov		Russian military leader, Lieutenant-General
3	Firudin bey Vazirov		Russian, Azerbaijani and Soviet military commander, commandant of Baku, Maj.-Gen
4	Veli bey Yadigar		Russian, Azerbaijani, Polish military commander
5	Jalil Safarov		National Hero of Azerbaijan
6	Vazir Sadiyev		National Hero of Azerbaijan
7	Eldar Agayev		National Hero of Azerbaijan
8	Amrah Aslanov		Full Cavalier of the Order of Glory
9	Shamistan Alizamanli		military speaker of the Azerbaijan Republic

== Sport ==
Number	Name	Image	Background
1	Zabit Samedov		kickboxer
2	Farid Mansurov		wrestler, 2004 Olympic gold medal winner
3	Kamandar Madzhidov		wrestler, 1988 Olympic gold medal winner
4	Nodar Mammadov		football player
5	Ramila Yusubova		judoka
6	Eshgin Guliyev		football player
7	Chingiz Allazov		kickboxer
8	Sanan Suleymanov		wrestler

== Scientific ==
Number	Name	Image	Background
1	Hamlet Isakhanli		Poet, philosopher, educator, mathematician
2	Nigar Shikhlinskaya		first Azerbaijani nurse
3	Dilara Aliyeva		Azerbaijani women's rights activist and scholar
4	Salahaddin Khalilov		philosopher

== See also ==
- Azerbaijanis in Georgia
- List of Azerbaijanis
