= Nazim Ibrahimov =

Azerbaijani politician

Nazim Ibrahimov Nazim Ibrahimov

Chairman of State Committee of Azerbaijan Republic on Work with Diaspora
- Incumbent
- Assumed office 19 November 2008
- President: Ilham Aliyev
- Preceded by: office established

Personal details
- Born: 23 December 1963 (age 62) Nakhchivan City, Azerbaijan

Nazim Ibrahimov Huseyn oglu (Azerbaijani: Nazim Ibrahimov Hüseyn oğlu; born 23 December 1963) is an Azerbaijani politician serving as the Chairman of State Committee of Azerbaijan Republic on Work with Diaspora.

== Early life ==
Ibrahimov was born on 23 December 1963 in Nakhchivan City, Azerbaijan. In 1980, he entered Azerbaijan Technical University graduating in 1985 with a degree in Mechanical Engineering. In 1985, he started working in construction. In 1985–1986, he worked at Nakhchivan Electronics Manufacturing Plant and in 1986–1991, he held several managerial positions in Nakhchivan Autonomous Republic of Azerbaijan. In 1991–1997, Ibrahimov worked in his own business.

== Political career ==
In March 1997, Ibrahimov was appointed Ambassador of Azerbaijan Republic to Ukraine. From September 1997, he was also the Ambassador to Moldova and Poland, and from February 1999, Ambassador to Belarus. In 2000, he was elected Member to National Assembly of Azerbaijan and was a member to Azerbaijani delegation to Parliamentary Assembly of the Council of Europe until September 2002. On 5 July 2002 he was appointed the Chairman of State Committee on Work with Azerbaijanis Living Abroad. On 19 November 2008 Ibrahimov was appointed the Chairman of State Committee on Work with Diaspora. He's the member of New Azerbaijan Party and member to International Public Management Association for Human Resources. In 2012 Nazim Ibrahimov joined the Nizami Ganjavi International Center Board, it is a cultural, non-profit, non-political organization dedicated to the memory of Azerbaijani poet, Nizami Ganjavi, the study and dissemination of his works, the promotion of the principles embodied in his writings, the advancement of culture and creative expression, and the promotion of learning, dialogue, tolerance and understanding between cultures and people.

Ibrahimov is married and has 2 children.

== See also ==
- Cabinet of Azerbaijan
- Azerbaijani diaspora
- Embassy of Azerbaijan in Kyiv
