= Embassy of Azerbaijan, Kyiv =

Azerbaijani diplomatic mission in Ukraine

Embassy of Azerbaijan in Kyiv
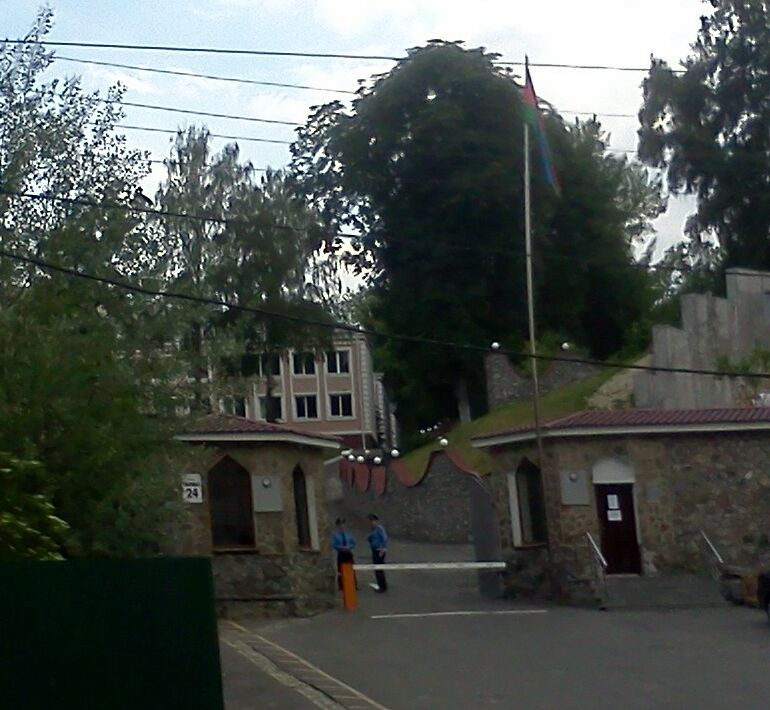
- Location: Kyiv
- Address: 24 Glybochitska str., Kyiv, 01901, Ukraine
- Coordinates: 50.4608°N 30.4907°E
- Ambassador: Elmira Akhundova

The Embassy of Azerbaijan in Kyiv is the diplomatic mission of Azerbaijan in Ukraine.

== History ==
Diplomatic relations between Azerbaijan and Ukraine were established on January 31, 1992. Embassy of Ukraine in Baku was established in 1996, the Embassy of Azerbaijan in Kyiv was opened in 1997.

== List of ambassadors ==
Order	Name	Term	Title	Notes
1	Jamal Sadikhov	1918–1919	Consul to Ukraine	
2	Yusif Vazir Chamanzaminli	1 November 1918 – 1919	Diplomatic representative	
3	Nazim Ibrahimov	1997–2001	Ambassador	
4	Talat Aliyev	2001–2010	Ambassador	
5	Eynulla Madatli	2010–2015	Ambassador	
6	Azer Khudiyev	2016–2020	Ambassador	
7	Elmira Akhundova	2020–2023	Ambassador	
8	Seymur Mardaliyev	2023–	Ambassador	

== See also ==
- Azerbaijan–Ukraine relations
- Foreign relations of Azerbaijan
- Foreign relations of Ukraine
- Diplomatic missions in Ukraine

== Recommended reading ==
- Ukrainian diplomatic encyclopedia /Українська дипломатична енциклопедія: У 2-х т./Редкол.:Л. В. Губерський (голова) та ін. — К.:Знання України, 2004 — Т.1 — 760с. ISBN 966-316-039-X
- Ukrainian diplomatic encyclopedia /Українська дипломатична енциклопедія: У 2-х т./Редкол.:Л. В. Губерський (голова) та ін. — К.:Знання України, 2004 — Т.2 — 812с. ISBN 966-316-045-4
