= Azerbaijan–Kyrgyzstan relations =

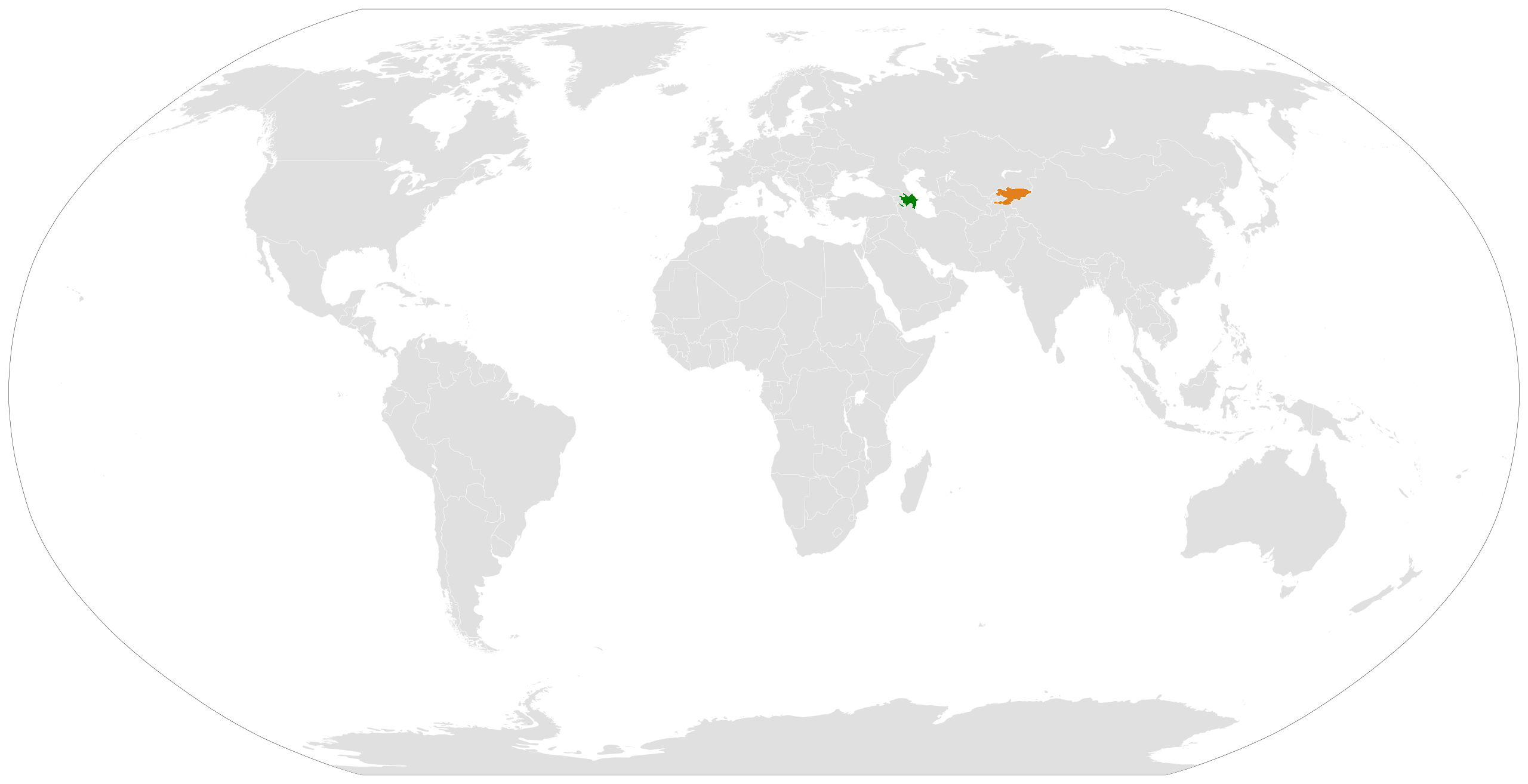

- Azerbaijan: Kyrgyzstan

Diplomatic mission
- Embassy of Azerbaijan, Bishkek: Embassy of Kyrgyzstan, Baku

Envoy
- Ambassador Latif Gandilov: Ambassador Maksat Mamytkanov

Diplomatic relations between Azerbaijan and Kyrgyzstan were established on January 19, 1993.

Over 20,000 Azerbaijanis live in Kyrgyzstan and actively participate as entrepreneurs and in the social life of the country. The main settlements of Azerbaijanis are Talas, Bishkek, and Kara-Balta. On May 16, 2007, the Embassy of Azerbaijan was opened in Kyrgyzstan.

The cultures of Azerbaijan and Kyrgyzstan have similar roots in terms of religion, traditions and language.

== Diplomatic relations ==
The first meeting of independent Azerbaijan and Kyrgyzstan presidents occurred in the first Commonwealth of Independent States (CIS) Heads of state council in 1993.

On November 11, 1996, foreign ministers of Azerbaijan and Kyrgyzstan signed a cooperation protocol.

The first visit of Kyrgyzstan president to Azerbaijan occurred in 1997 where 14 agreements were signed, where the most notable were Friendship Agreement between republics and cooperation of Justice Ministries from both sides. Moreover, the working group which specializes in interparliamentary relations was created.

In addition, president of Kyrgyzstan Askar Akayev visited the conference in Baku where the restoration of the Silk Road as part of TRACECA was being actively discussed. Furthermore, a multilateral European-Caucasus-Asia corridor cooperation agreement was signed.

In 2004, bilateral military sphere cooperation pact was signed between Ministries of Defense.

On October 3, 2009, Kyrgyzstan President Kurmanbek Bakiyev visited Nakhchivan for a summit of heads of Turkic speaking countries. At this meeting, the Turkic Council was founded.

On March 30–31, 2012, President of Kyrgyzstan paid a working visit to Azerbaijan.

== High level visits ==
=== Visits from Azerbaijan to Kyrgyzstan ===
- President Heydar Aliyev(1995)
- President Ilham Aliyev ( 2016, 2026)
- Minister of Foreign Affairs Elmar Mammadyarov ( 2020)

=== Visits from Kyrgyzstan to Azerbaijan ===
- President Askar Akayev( 1997)
- President Almazbek Atambayev ( 2012)
- President Sadyr Japarov ( 2022)
- Minister of Foreign Affairs Roza Otunbayeva (1996)
- Minister of Foreign Affairs Chingiz Aidarbekov (2020)
- Minister of Foreign Affairs Ruslan Kazakbayev (2021)

== Economic relations ==
On 23 April 1997, the Intergovernmental Joint Commission was established under the Agreement on Trade and Economic Cooperation signed between the Government of the Republic of Azerbaijan and the Government of the Kyrgyzstan. The Commission was established to promote economic and humanitarian cooperation between the two countries.

The Commission works to develop economic and humanitarian cooperation between Azerbaijan and Kyrgyzstan. By 2023, it had held five meetings, the most recent of which took place on 26 July 2023 in Cholpon-Ata, Kyrgyzstan.

=== Imports and exports ===
Imports of Azerbaijan
Year	Amount Thousands of USD
2020	3 584,32
2021	2 995,04 ▼
2022	6 073,47 ▲
2023	5 640,01 ▼

Exports of Azerbaijan
Year	Amount Thousands of USD
2020	1 832,86
2021	6 023,13 ▲
2022	4 736,65 ▼
2023	59 338,32 ▲

== Cultural relations ==
In 2021, Kyrgyzstan's Minister of Culture, Information, Sports and Youth Policy, Kairat Imanaliyev, visited Azerbaijan to attend the Turkic Council's high-level meeting on information and media. In the same year, with Azerbaijan's support, a school with a capacity of 550 students was built in Bishkek, and the Azerbaijan–Kyrgyzstan Friendship Park was established.

== Inter-parliamentary relations ==
The Azerbaijan–Kyrgyzstan Interparliamentary Relations Working Group operates within the Milli Majlis of Azerbaijan. Established on 13 December 2005, it is chaired by Member of Parliament Musa Guliyev. The Kyrgyzstan–Azerbaijan Friendship Group operates within the Jogorku Kenesh, the Parliament of Kyrgyzstan, and is chaired by Saidbek Meyracdinovich Zulpuyev.

== See also ==
- Azerbaijanis in Kyrgyzstan
- Foreign relations of Azerbaijan
- Foreign relations of Kyrgyzstan
