= Azerbaijani Canadians =

Total population
- 9,915

Regions with significant populations
- Greater Toronto, Vancouver Metropolitan Area and other

Languages
- Azerbaijani, Canadian English, Canadian French, Russian, Persian, Turkish

Religion
- Predominantly Shiite Muslim

Azerbaijani Canadians (Azerbaijani: Kanadalı azərbaycanlılar) are Canadian citizens and permanent residents of ethnic Azerbaijani background, or those who were born in Azerbaijan. Most Azerbaijani-Canadians have immigrated to Canada from the Republic of Azerbaijan, Iran, Russia or Turkey.

== Demographics ==
According to the Canada 2021 Census, 9,915 Canadians claimed ethnic Azerbaijani background, with nearly half living in Ontario. The 2021 census results also mapped the following distribution of Azerbaijani Canadians by province:

Ontario – 5,912
British Columbia – 1,665
Quebec – 995
Alberta – 975
Manitoba – 130
Saskatchewan – 85
Newfoundland and Labrador – 45
Nova Scotia – 45
New Brunswick – 25
Prince Edward Island – 20
(Source: 2021 Canadian Census)

== History ==
As of 2016, there were 1,260 Canadians of Azerbaijani origin who were second-generation immigrants and only 40 who were third-generation or more.

Though immigration from Azerbaijan dates earlier than 1980, ethnic Azerbaijanis were first mentioned in the official census results in 2001. Since then, their numbers have gradually grown, with immigration peaking in 2001–2005.

Year	Canada's Azeri population
2001	1,445
2006	▲3,465
2011	▲4,580
2016	▲6,425
2021	▲9,915

== Notable Azerbaijani Canadians ==
- Piruz Dilanchi - politician, poet, writer, public figure
- Reza Baraheni – prominent scholar and human rights activist
- Ismayil Hajiyev – musician, composer and conductor
- Reza Moridi – Member of the Ontario Provincial Parliament
- Feridun Hamdullahpur - sixth president and vice-chancellor (2010-2021) of the University of Waterloo
- Ilham Akhundov - mathematician, University of Waterloo

== Organizations ==
There are a number of active cultural and political advocacy Azerbaijani organizations established in Canada.

- Network of Azerbaijani Canadians (NAC) - is a primary advocacy organization active in promoting and preserving Azerbaijani culture, and representing the interests of Azerbaijani Canadians. It was founded in September 2020 and headquartered in Toronto, ON.
- Tabriz Azerbaijani Music and Dance Ensemble - was founded in Toronto in 2003. It originally consisted of Dance and Music groups, but recently we have added a Choir group as well. The Music and Dance groups have in recent years expanded in number, in diversity of instruments and dances, as well as, in repertoire.
- Azerbaijan Cultural Society of Edmonton (AzCSE) - is a cultural society established in 2012. The main objective of AzCSE is to gather all Edmontonians who are interested in Azerbaijan's culture, dances, music, foods. It is based in Edmonton, AB.
- Alberta Azerbaijani Cultural Society (ALACS) - was established in 2005 to promote and advocate for Azerbaijani history, language and culture, and is based in Calgary, AB.
- Karabakh - Azerbaijani Language School in Ottawa - was established in 2011.
- Azerbaijani Women's Support Center (AWSC) - was founded in 2005 to support and empower newcomer and immigrant women from diverse backgrounds. The organization is based in Toronto, ON and is a registered charity.
- Alov Foundation - founded in 2019 to support charity initiatives of the Azerbaijani community in Canada.
- Azerbaijani Canadian Youth Network - is a Toronto-based non-profit established in 2021.

== See also ==
- Azerbaijani Americans
- West Asian Canadians
- Middle Eastern Canadians
- Iranian Canadians
- Turkish Canadians
- Azerbaijan–Canada relations
- Azerbaijani diaspora
- Ethnic origins of people in Canada
