= State Committee on Work with Diaspora (Azerbaijan) =

Government entity of Azerbaijan

The State Committee on Work with Diaspora of the Republic of Azerbaijan
- Azərbaycan Respublikasının Diasporla İş üzrə Dövlət Komitəsi
- Coat of Arms of Azerbaijan

Agency overview
- Formed: November 19, 2008
- Superseding agency: The State Committee on Work with Azerbaijanis Living Abroad
- Headquarters: 24 Samad Vurgun Street, Baku, Azerbaijan Republic AZ1000
- Agency executive: Fuad Muradov, Chairman of State Committee on Work with Diaspora
- Website: www.diaspor.gov.az

The State Committee on Work with Diaspora of the Republic of Azerbaijan (Azerbaijani: Azərbaycan Respublikasının Diasporla İş üzrə Dövlət Komitəsi) is a governmental agency within the Cabinet of Azerbaijan in charge of establishing and maintaining contacts with the Azerbaijani diaspora abroad and support Azerbaijanis around the world in their efforts for national unity. The ministry is headed by Fuad Muradov.

== History ==
Since the restoration of independence of Azerbaijan in 1991, supporting Azerbaijanis in other countries in defending national interests of Azerbaijan has become a priority for Azerbaijani government. In order to foster better ties with ethnic Azerbaijanis around the world, preserve their national identity, establish a network of Azerbaijani organizations around the world to ensure national solidarity, the President of Azerbaijan Heydar Aliyev signed a decree on holding a World Azerbaijanis Congress on 23 May 2001. Therefore, the 1st World Azerbaijanis Congress was held on 9–10 November of the same year. Four hundred representatives from over 200 diaspora organizations from 36 countries participated in the congress. Over 700 representatives and 844 guests from 130 state and public organizations of Azerbaijan, members of 25 political parties took part in the conference.

On 5 July 2002, President Heydar Aliyev signed a decree on creation of State Committee on Work with Azerbaijanis Living Abroad. On 19 November 2008 the Presidential Decree No. 54 superseded the committee with the new State Committee on Work with Diaspora.

== Structure ==
The committee is headed by a Chairman and Deputy Chairman. The committee cooperates with other central and local executive and municipal bodies, diplomatic representations of Azerbaijan in other countries, and NGOs working with Azerbaijanis living abroad. The committee provides organizational, informative material (books, publications, films) and cultural assistance to Azerbaijanis living abroad and to the diaspora organisations established by them. The main functions of the committee are helping Azerbaijanis living abroad to preserve and develop their national identity, study and increase application of their native language; providing favorable conditions for Azerbaijanis living abroad to create and develop close ties with the Azeri state bodies and NGOs in Azerbaijan; engaging ethnic Azerbaijanis in the economic, social and cultural development of Azerbaijan; help preserve national ideas and national-cultural values ensuring the worldwide solidarity of Azerbaijanis around the world; involving Azerbaijanis living abroad in economic development creating favourable conditions for Azeribaijanis to attract investment in Azerbaijan; providing assistance to Azerbaijanis living abroad to hold events of importance to Azerbaijan such as Khojaly Massacre, Black January and Day of Azerbaijani Genocide.

=== First department ===
The main responsibilities of the first department:

- Taking purposeful and necessary measures to achieve the solidarity of Azerbaijanis living in Western Europe;
- To take necessary measures related to create opportunities for Azerbaijanis living in Western Europe to access accurate information about the domestic and foreign policies of Azerbaijan, as well as the socio-economic and cultural life of the country;
- to establish and develop close relations between Azerbaijanis living in Western Europe with Azerbaijan, as well as non-governmental organisations of Azerbaijan;
- organisation of work to assist on the implementation of national-cultural public associations of Azerbaijanis in accordance with international law, the laws of Western European countries and Azerbaijan;
- To organise an effective mechanism of work with the relevant structures of the states where Azerbaijanis live, for defence and protection of civil rights of Azerbaijanis living in European countries based on international documents;
- To organise the participation of relevant state and non-governmental organisations, art masters, public figures, science and culture representatives in events held by the Azerbaijani diaspora in Western European countries;

=== Second department ===
The main responsibilities of the second department:

- To establish and develop close relationships between the state bodies of Azerbaijan, as well as non-governmental organisations and Azerbaijanis living in Russia, Ukraine, Belarus, India and China, to help Azerbaijanis get information about the economic, social and cultural life, as well as the domestic and foreign policies of Azerbaijan;
- To involve Azerbaijanis living in Russia, Ukraine, Belarus, India and China in the economic, social and cultural development of Azerbaijan, as well as the political life of society and the state;
- To support the communication of Azerbaijanis living in Russia, Ukraine, Belarus, India and China with each other and their organisational activities;
- To help to create a connection between the public, cultural and other associations established in Russia, Ukraine, Belarus, India and China and Azerbaijan;
- To participate in public events held by Azerbaijanis living in Russia, Ukraine, Belarus, India and China, and to provide for the participation of relevant governmental and non-governmental organisations in Azerbaijan;

== See also ==
- ASAIF
- Cabinet of Azerbaijan
- Azerbaijani diaspora
- Azerbaijani Americans
- Azerbaijan – European Union relations
