= Azerbaijanis in Uzbekistan =

Uzbek citizen of Azerbaijani ancestry

Azerbaijanis in Uzbekistan Özbəkistan azərbaycanlıları
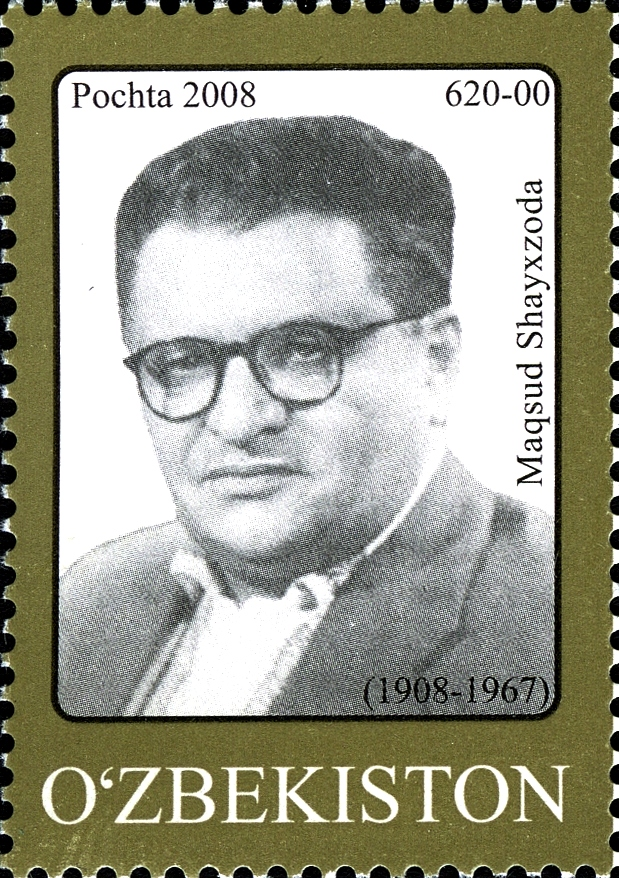

Total population
- 35,848 (Census 2000)

Regions with significant populations
- Tashkand

Languages
- Azerbaijani • Uzbek • Russian

Religion
- Predominantly Muslim

Related ethnic groups
- Azerbaijani diaspora

Azerbaijanis in Uzbekistan (Azerbaijani: Özbəkistan azərbaycanlıları) are part of the Azerbaijani diaspora. They are Uzbek citizens and permanent residents of ethnic Azerbaijani background. Azerbaijan and Uzbekistan used to be part of the Russian Empire and later the Soviet Union. Currently there are over 35,848 Azerbaijanis in Uzbekistan, making up 0.15% of Uzbekistan's population.

Population of Azerbaijanis in Uzbekistan according to ethnic group 1926–1989
Ethnic group	census 1926^{1}		census 1939^{2}		census 1959^{3}		census 1970^{4}		census 1979^{5}		census 1989^{6}	
Ethnic group	20,764	0.4	3,645	0.1	40,511	0.5	40,431	0.3	59,779	0.4	44,410	0.2
^{1} Excluding the Tajik ASSR, but including the Kara-Kalpak Autonomous Oblast (in 1926 part of the Kazakh ASSR); source: . ^{2} Source: . ^{3} Source: . ^{4} Source: . ^{5} Source: . ^{6} Source: .

== Notable people ==
- Movlud Miraliyev
- Rafig Huseynov
- Maqsud Shayxzoda
- Nasiba Abdullaeva

== See also ==
- Azerbaijan–Uzbekistan relations
- Turkic Council
- Azerbaijani diaspora
- Demographics of Uzbekistan
