= Azerbaijanis in Kyrgyzstan =

Azerbaijanis in Kyrgyzstan Qırğızıstan azərbaycanlıları
Total population
- 17,267 (0.3%)(Census 2009)

Regions with significant populations
- Bishkek

Languages
- Azerbaijani • Kyrgyz • Russian

Religion
- Predominantly Muslim

Related ethnic groups
- Azerbaijani diaspora

Azerbaijanis in Kyrgyzstan (Azerbaijani: Qırğızıstan azərbaycanlıları) are part of the wider Azerbaijani diaspora. They primarily include Kyrgyz citizens and permanent residents of Azerbaijani ethnicity. Both Azerbaijan and Kyrgyzstan used to be part of the Russian Empire and the Soviet Union. As of 2009, there were 17,267 Azerbaijanis living in Kyrgyzstan. As of 2024, there were more than 20,000 Azeris living in Kyrgyzstan. In recent years, both countries have increased their efforts in cultural cooperation and exchanges. Azerbaijani culture and Kyrgyz culture share commonalities due to a common Turkic ancestry and shared historical experiences.

Population of Azerbaijanis in Kyrgyzstan according to ethnic group 1926–2014
census 1926^{1}		census 1939^{2}		census 1959^{3}		census 1970^{4}		census 1979^{5}		census 1989^{6}		census 1999^{7}		census 2009^{7}		estimate 2014^{7}	
3,631	0.4	7,724	0.5	10,428	0.5	12,536	0.4	17,207	0.5	15,775	0.4	14,014	0.3	17,267	0.3	18,946	0.3
^{1} Source: . ^{2} Source: . ^{3} Source: . ^{4} Source: . ^{5} Source: . ^{6} Source: . ^{7} Source: .

== See also ==
- Azerbaijan–Kyrgyzstan relations
- Azerbaijani diaspora
- Turkic Council
- Demographics of Kyrgyzstan
