= Network of Azerbaijani Canadians =

Azerbaijani advocacy organisation in Canada

- Abbreviation: NAC
- Formation: 2020
- Type: Nonprofit organization
- Legal status: Active
- Purpose: Advocating on behalf of Azerbaijani Canadians before the municipal, provincial and federal governments and bodies.
- Headquarters: Toronto, Canada
- Region served: Canada
- Executive Director: Nika Jabiyeva
- Chairman of the Board: Dmitriy Kirillov (07/2023 - present)
- Previous Chairmen: 01/2021 - 06/2021 - Anar Jahangirli 07/2021 - 06/2022 - Anar Jahangirli 07/2022 - 06/2023 - Anar Jahangirli
- Main organ: Board of Directors Annual General Meeting
- Website: www.azcanet.ca

The Network of Azerbaijani Canadians (NAC, French: Réseau des Canadiens Azerbaïdjanais, Azerbaijani: Kanadalı Azərbaycanlılar Şəbəkəsi) is a fully community-funded and the largest grassroots Azerbaijani advocacy organization in Canada. Founded in 2020, the organization advocates on behalf of Azerbaijani Canadians in matters of public policy. The organization is based in Toronto; board members and organization members are spread across Canada including Ottawa, Edmonton, Calgary, Montreal and Vancouver. The Network of Azerbaijani Canadians is a registered non-profit and managed by its board of directors.

== History ==
The Network of Azerbaijani Canadians was founded in September 2020. The organization's foundation was motivated by the desire of members of the Azerbaijani community in Canada to create a platform for representation and increase political awareness within Canada of the Second Karabakh War. The NAC sought to raise public awareness about displaced Azerbaijanis that took place during the Nagorno Karabakh conflict in the late 1980s and the early 1990s. The NAC also urged the Prime Minister of Canada – Justin Trudeau - and Global Affairs Canada to condemn Armenia's actions following the 2020 Barda missile attacks.

== Advocacy initiatives ==
The organization seeks to strengthen Canada–Azerbaijan relations. With regard to the recent conflict between Azerbaijan and Armenia, the organization advocates the signing of a peace agreement between the two countries. Following the 2020 war, the NAC Executive team worked to activate the Azerbaijani Canadian community to become more politically involved. It encouraged the community to engage more actively in electoral district issues and MP campaigns during the 2021 Canadian federal election and organizing meetings with Canadian government officials.

Some of the recent initiatives of NAC included calling for the de-mining of the Karabakh region of Azerbaijan and Canada's support to this end. NAC also seeks to draw attention to the 1992 Khojaly Massacre. NAC filed a petition (e-3780) to the Government of Canada in January 2022. In a response by the Minister of Foreign Affairs of Canada signed by MP Rob Oliphant, Parliamentary Secretary to the Minister, the Government of Canada reaffirmed Canada's recognition of all UN Security Council resolutions on Nagorno-Karabakh and Azerbaijan’s territorial integrity within its internationally recognized borders.

The members of NAC's Board of Directors have held meetings at high level with the members of Cabinet on numerous occasions to inform the Ministers on the matters and initiatives the Azerbaijani Canadians stand for.

On November 8, 2021 and November 9, 2022, the colours of the Flag of Azerbaijan were projected on Niagara Falls on the initiative of NAC.

On November 10, 2022, the organization brought together the leaders of Jewish and Azerbaijani communities in Canada joined by the distinguished members of Canada's parliament to celebrate Azerbaijan's Jewish heritage.
