= Huseyngulu Mammadov =

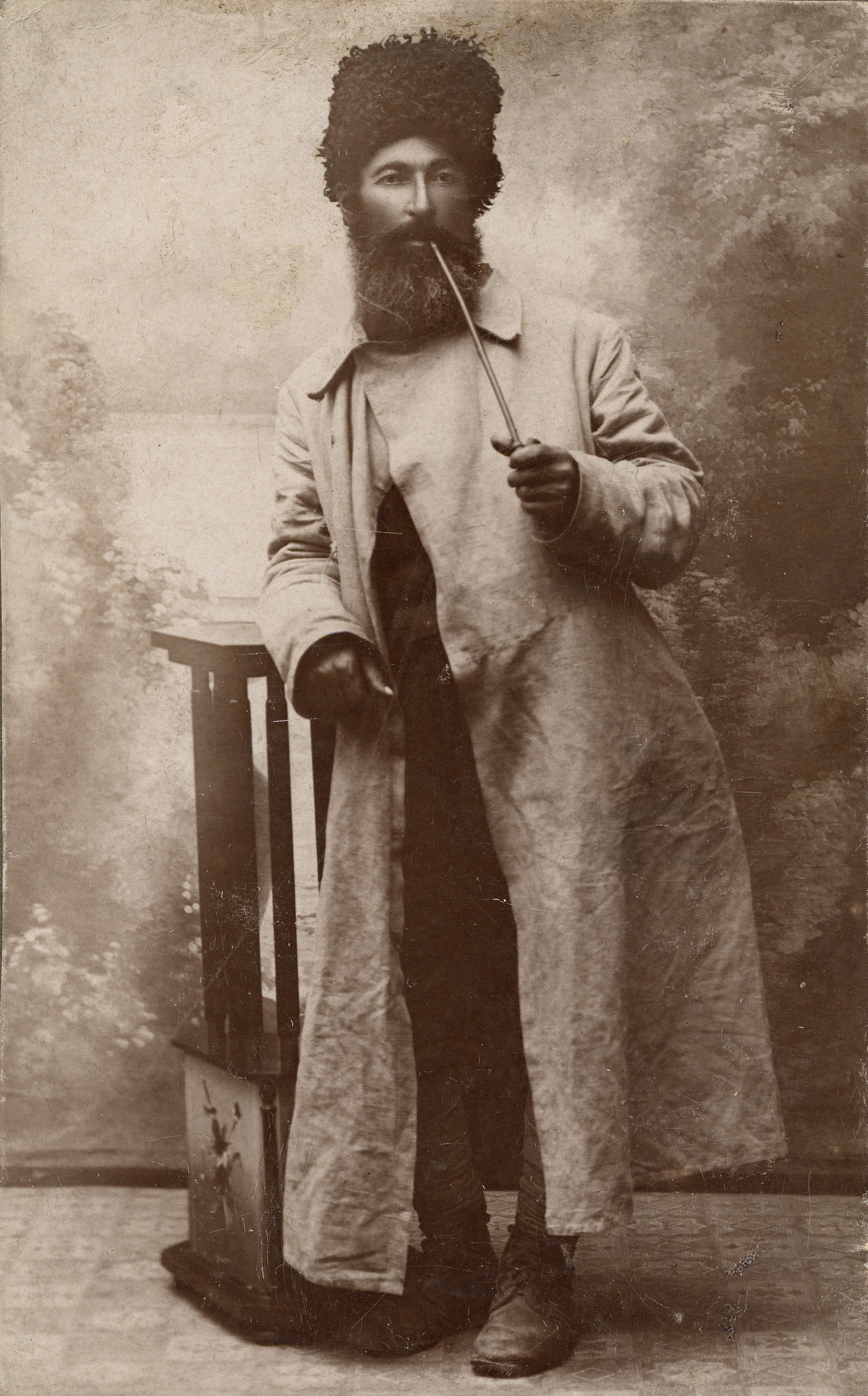
- Huseyngulu Mammadov, 1919, Tbilisi

Member of Constituent Assembly of Georgia
- In office 12 March 1919 – 17 March 1921
- Constituency: Kakheti

Personal details
- Born: 1875 Mughanlo, Signakh Uyezd, Tiflis Governorate, Russian Empire
- Died: c. 1921 Georgia SSR
- Party: Social Democratic Party of Georgia

Huseyngulu Mammadov (Georgian: ჰუსეინ ყული-მამედ ოღლუ მამედოვი, Azerbaijani: Hüseyn (Söyün) Gülməmməd oğlu Məmmədov) — was a Georgian politician of Azerbaijani origins.

== Life ==
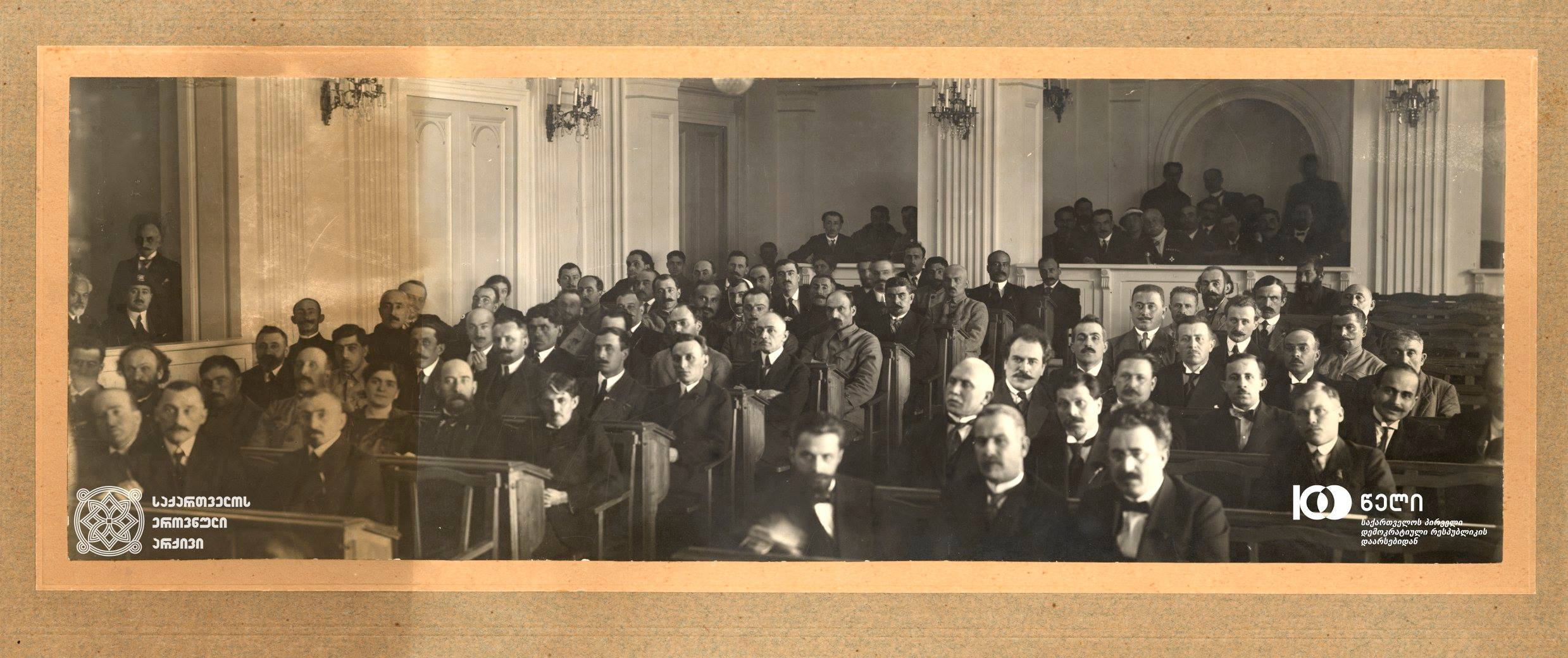
Huseyngulu Mammadov on the right row, back.

He was born in 1875, Mughanlo village of Signakh Uyezd, then part of Tiflis Governorate in Russian Empire to an ethnic Azerbaijani (then called Tatars) peasant family. He was a member of the Russian Social-Democratic Workers' Party from 1899. He co-founded Muslim Social Democratic Party's Tbilisi branch in 1904. He was one of the signatories to The Act of Independence of Georgia on May 26, 1918.

In 1919 he became only Azerbaijani to be represented in Constituent Assembly of Georgia, from Social Democratic Party of Georgia. In March 1919, together with Giorgi Anjaparidze, Samson Pirtskhalava and Petre Surguladze, he was elected to a special commission set up to study the causes of the Akhaltsikhe uprising.

He knew Georgian fluently and often contributed to Ertoba (Georgian: ერთობა) newspaper. He was also active in promoting Georgian sovereignty claim over disputed Zaqatala Governorate against Azerbaijan, despite his origins. He actively worked in various commissions set up to solve the problems related to the Muslims of Georgia.

He remained in Georgia after Red Army invasion of Georgia. No further information has been found about his whereabouts later.
