= Latif Gandilov =

Azerbaijani ambassador (born 1957)

- Lətif Seyfəddin oğlu Qəndilov
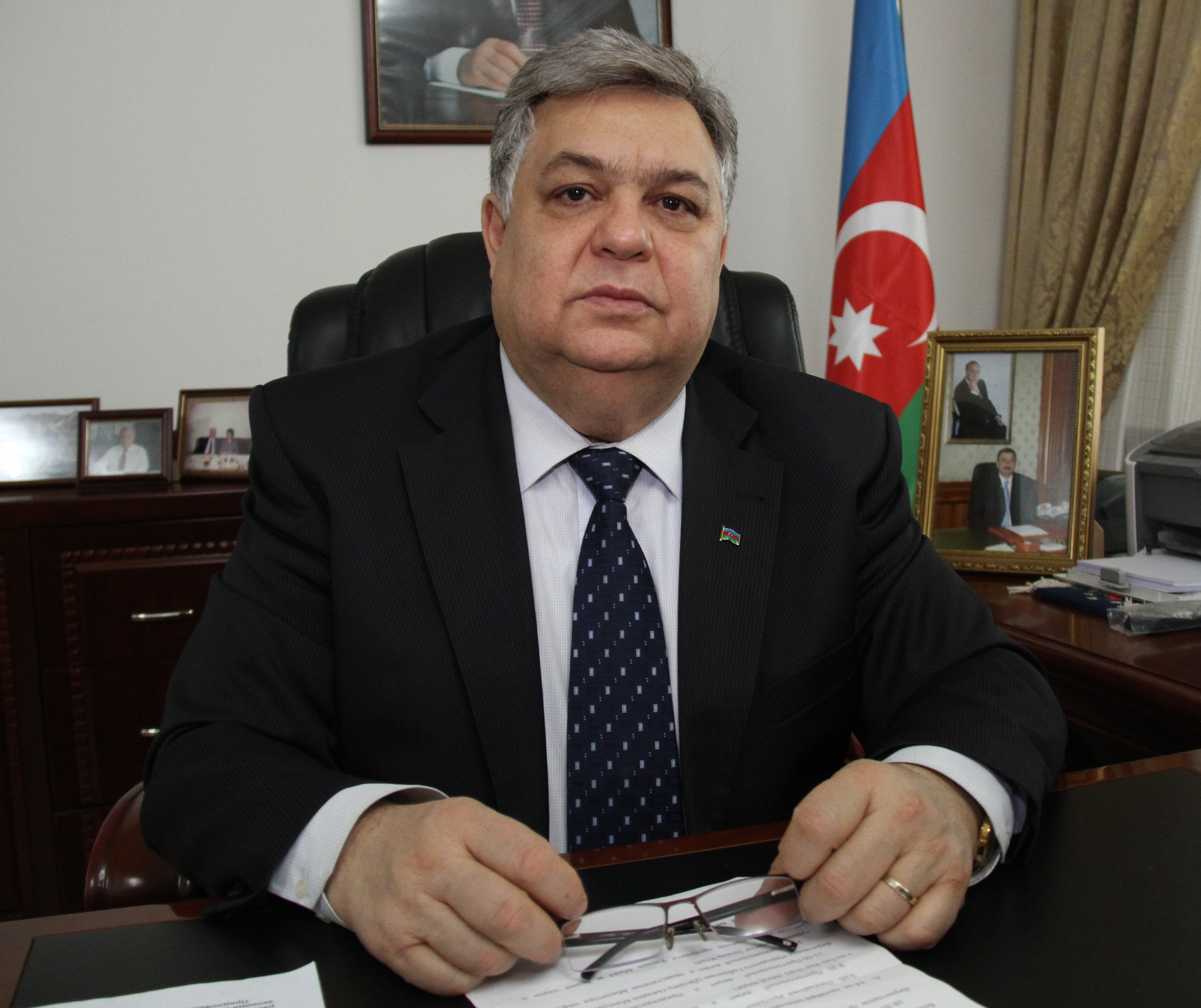

3rd Republic of Azerbaijan Ambassador to Republic of Kyrgyzstan
- Incumbent
- Assumed office October 6, 2021
- President: Ilham Aliyev
- Preceded by: Hidayat Orujov

5th Republic of Azerbaijan Ambassador to Republic of Belarus
- In office December 21, 2016 – July 16, 2021
- President: Ilham Aliyev
- Preceded by: Isfandiyar Vahabzade
- Succeeded by: Ulvi Bakhshaliyev

3rd Republic of Azerbaijan Ambassador to People's Republic of China
- In office August 16, 2011 – October 27, 2016
- President: Ilham Aliyev
- Preceded by: Yashar Tofigi Aliyev
- Succeeded by: Akram Zeynalli

1st Republic of Azerbaijan Ambassador to Republic of Kazakhstan
- In office January 29, 2004 – June 24, 2010
- President: Ilham Aliyev
- Preceded by: Position established
- Succeeded by: Zakir Hashimov

Personal details
- Born: August 31, 1957 Baku, Azerbaijan
- Parent: Seyfaddin Gandilov (father)
- Education: Institute of National Economy of Azerbaijan
- Occupation: diplomat, university teacher
- Profession: economist

Latif Gandilov (Azerbaijani: Lətif Seyfəddin oğlu Qəndilov; born August 31, 1957, Baku, Azerbaijan) is an Azerbaijani diplomat. The ambassador of Azerbaijan to Kyrgyzstan. Previously served as the ambassador of Azerbaijan to Belarus (2016-2021), China, North Korea, Mongolia (2011-2016) and Vietnam (2011-2013) residing in Beijing, and to Kazakhstan (2004-2010).

== Biography ==
Latif Gandilov was born in Baku in the family of prominent Azerbaijani scholar Seyfaddin Gandilov.

He studied in Institute of National Economy of Azerbaijan in 1974-1978 and got Candidate of Sciences (PhD) degree in economics in 1984.

In 1986-1995 he worked as docent (associate professor) in "Economic Theory" department of Azerbaijan Technical University.

Since 1995 he is in diplomatic service, and in 2001 he received his first appointment abroad — the first secretary, and then the counsellor of Embassy of the Republic of Azerbaijan to the Republic of Turkey.

In 2004 he was appointed as the first ambassador of Azerbaijan to Kazakhstan and held this position till 2010. From 2011 to 2016 he served as the ambassador of Azerbaijan to China, North Korea, Mongolia, and Vietnam (2011-2013) with residence in Beijing. On December 21, 2016, he was appointed to his current position — the ambassador of Azerbaijan to Belarus.

Latif Gandilov is married and has 4 children.
