= Fuad Muradov =

Azerbaijani politician (born 1979)

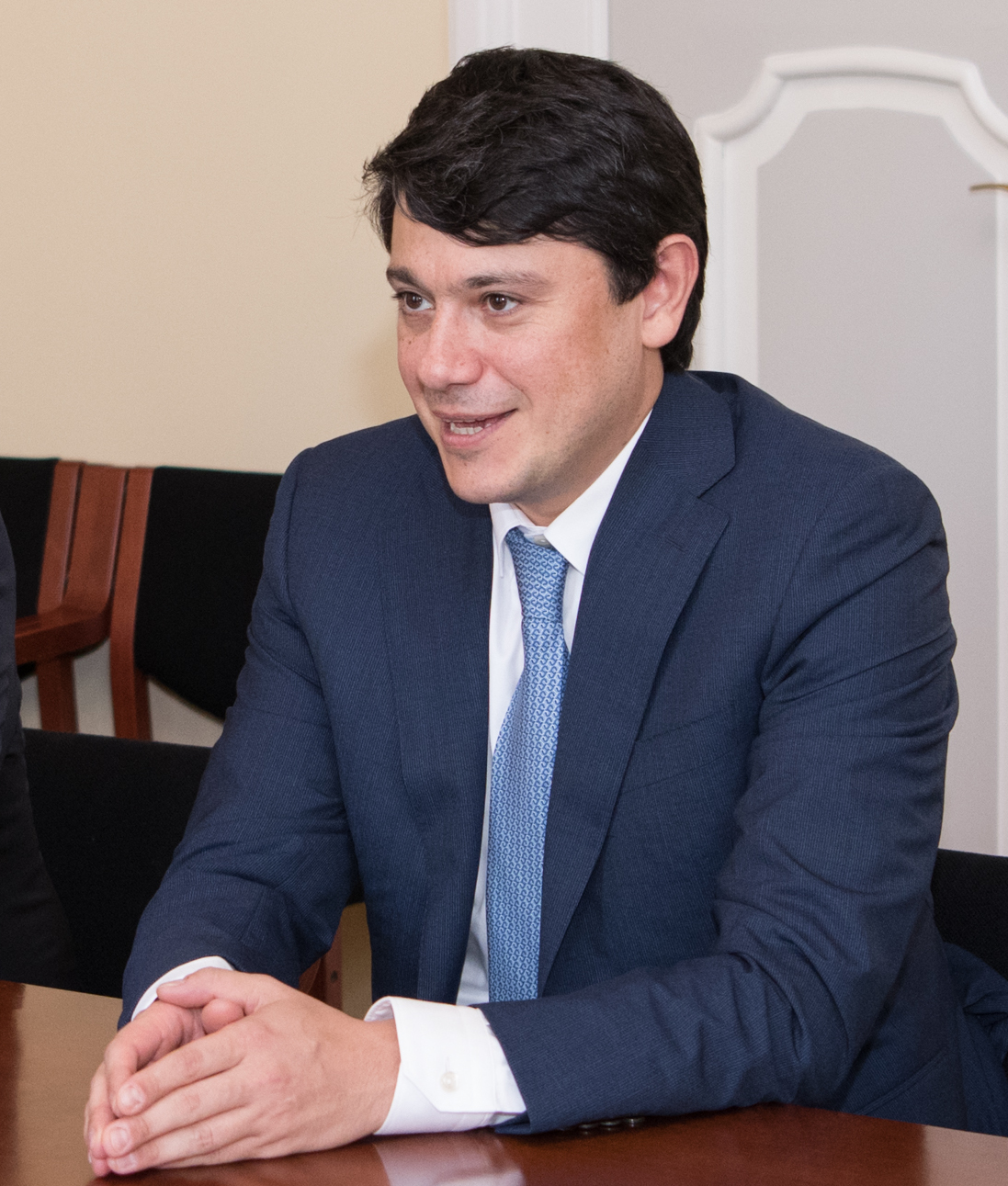
- Muradov in 2019
- Born: Fuad Rauf oglu Muradov; 22 July 1979 (age 45); Baku, Azerbaijan
- Occupation(s): Chairman of the State Committee on Work with Diaspora, Chairman of the Great Silk Way International Youth Union.
- Children: 2
- Website: www.fmuradov.az

Fuad Muradov (born 22 July 1979) is an Azerbaijani politician.

From 1986 to 1996, he studied in 6th secondary school in Baku. He is the Chairman of the State Committee on Work with Diaspora. He has graduated from the Industrial Heat Engineering Department of the Azerbaijan State Oil Academy. Holds master's degree on Environment and Oil Industry from Joint Master Program of the Azerbaijan State Oil Academy, University of Nice (France) and University of Genoa (Italy). Holds Ph.D. in chemistry.

On 6 November 2005, he was elected as Member of Parliament (Milli Mejlis) from Sabail Constituency No 29. In 2010, he was re-elected to the Parliament of Azerbaijan from Sabail Constituency No 29. He is married, has 2 children.
