= Ramiz Hasanov =

Azerbaijani politician

Ramiz Hasanov Ramiz Həsənov

Chairman of State Committee on Standardization, Metrology and Patents of Azerbaijan Republic
- Incumbent
- Assumed office December 14, 2005
- President: Ilham Aliyev

Personal details
- Born: August 20, 1961 (age 65) Marneuli, Georgia

Ramiz Hasanov Ayvaz oglu (Azerbaijani: Ramiz Həsənov Ayvaz oğlu; born August 20, 1961) is an Azerbaijani politician who serves as the Chairman of State Committee on Standardization, Metrology and Patents of Azerbaijan Republic.

== Early life ==
Hasanov was born on August 20, 1961 in Marneuli, Georgia. In 1978–1983, he studied at the Moscow State Institute of International Relations. After graduation, he worked at the Ministry of Foreign Trade of Soviet Union until 1990. In 1990-1992, he worked in Foreign Economic Relations Commission at the Cabinet of Ministers of Azerbaijan. From 1993 through 1997, Hasanov worked at Ministry of Economy. In 1997–2004, he was the first deputy chairman of Azərkontrakt state concern.

== Political career ==
In 2004–2005, Hasanov served as the Ambassador of Azerbaijan Republic to Georgia. On December 14, 2005, he was appointed the Chairman of State Committee on Standardization, Metrology and Patents. Hasanov is fluent in English, Russian, Turkish and Georgian. He's married and has two children.

== See also ==
- Cabinet of Azerbaijan
