= Nəsimi raion =

Settlement of Baku, Azerbaijan

Nasimi Nəsimi
- Rayon
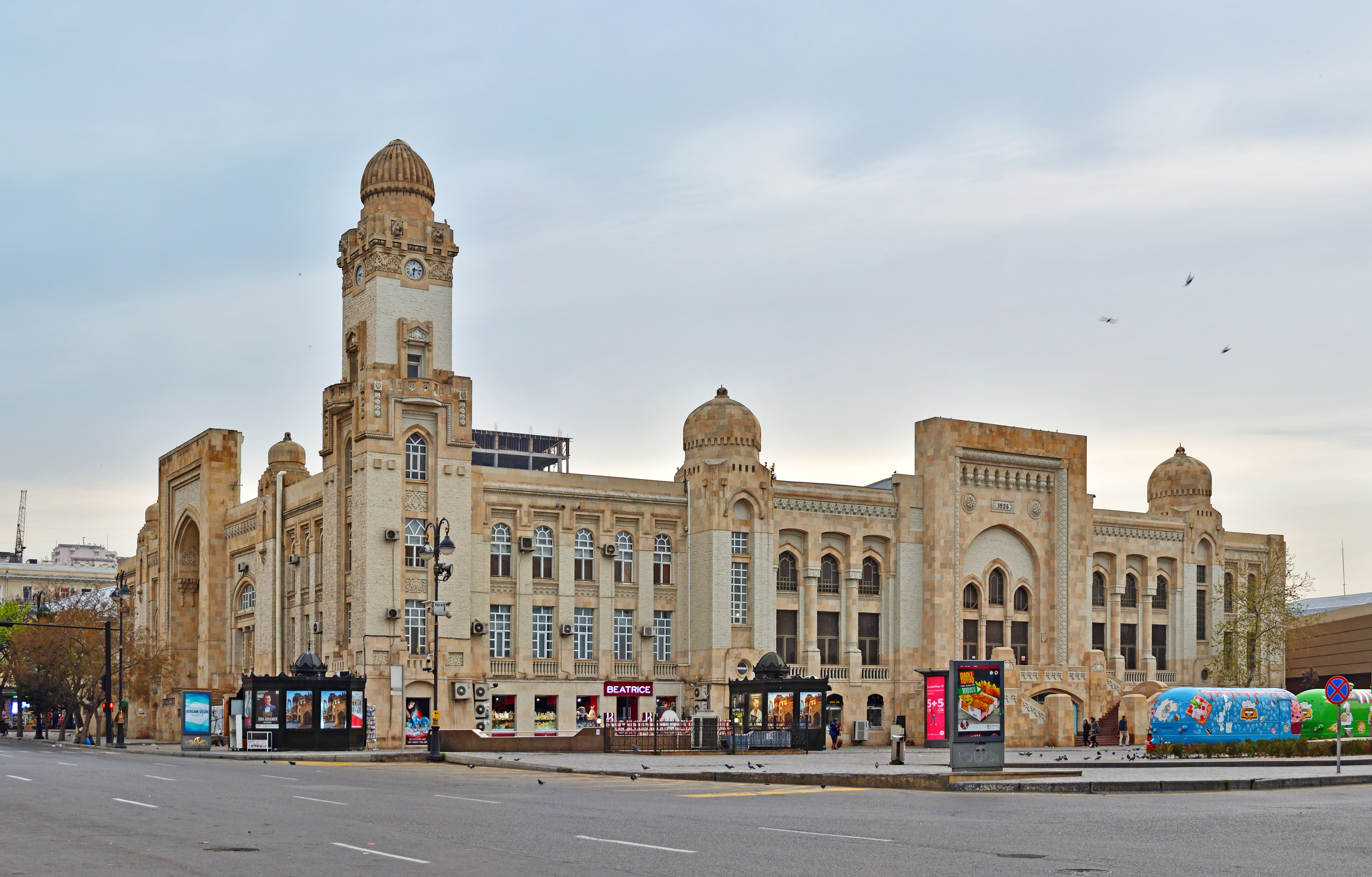
- Baku Electrical Railway Station, built in 1846

- Location of Nasimi in Baku
- Country: Azerbaijan
- City: Baku

Government
  - Body: Nasimi Rayon Executive Power
  - Mayor: Askerov Asif Yunis-oglu

Area
  - Total: 9.8 km^{2} (3.8 sq mi)

Population
  - Total: 222,618
  - Density: 23,000/km^{2} (59,000/sq mi)
- Time zone: UTC+4 (AZT)
- Area code: +994 12
- Website: nasimi-ih.gov.az/az

Nasimi rayon (Azerbaijani: Nəsimi rayonu) is a settlement and raion of Baku, capital of Azerbaijan, named after Imadaddin Nasimi and formed on June 13, 1969. The administrative territory of the Nasimi district, one of the central districts of Baku, is 10 km² and as of 2023, the population is 222,618 in the official registration. The raion is bordered from the northeast by Narimanov raion, from the south by Sabail raion, from the west by Yasamal raion and from the north by Binagadi raion. The executive government of Nasimi rayon was founded in November 1991.

The raion houses the ministries of Finance and Healthcare, State Committee on Standardization, Metrology and Patents, State Railway Department, State Energy Control Office, State Circus and some other institutions. Nasimi Municipality operates in the district. There are no settlements, villages, and other administrative territorial units in Nasimi district. There are 19 large industrial enterprises, 4 Scientific Research and Design Institutes, 13 banks and their branches, 9 communication enterprises, and 11 hotels. The largest enterprise according to the number of employees is "Baku Tikish Evi" OJSC. There are 8 secondary schools, 4 secondary and vocational schools, 8 secondary schools (Azerbaijan State Oil and Industry University, Music Academy, Azerbaijan Medical University, Azerbaijan University of Languages, Baku Slavic University, Baku Asian University, Azerbaijan University, Baku Girls University) educational institution, 2 music schools, 47 nursery-kindergartens, 11 hospitals, 11 polyclinics, 13 architectural monuments.

2,457 families (10,872 persons) from Nagorno-Karabakh and other occupied territories have been temporarily settled in the region.

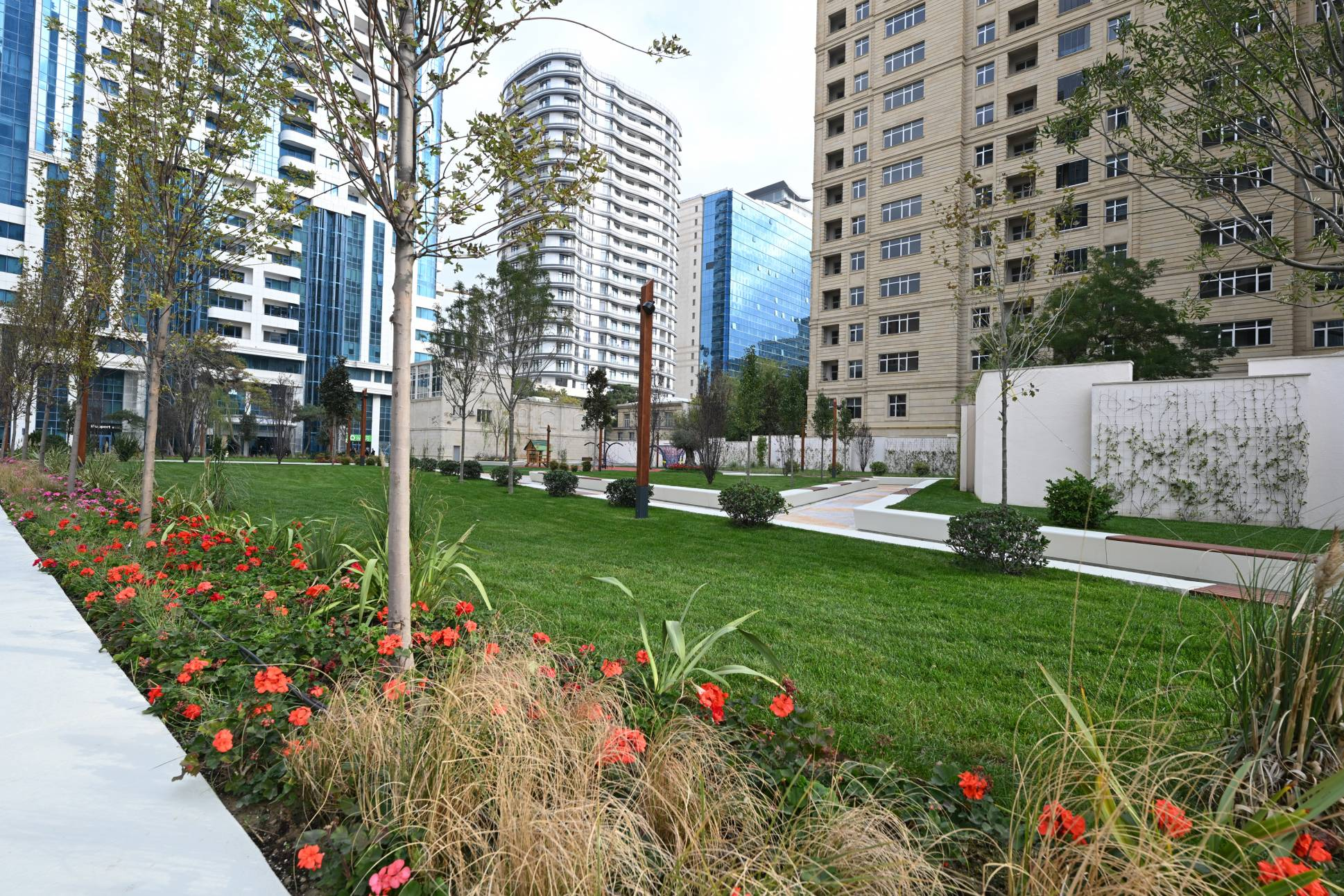
Nasimi District

== Transportation ==
=== Railroad ===
Baku suburban railway at Baku railway station is located in this area.

=== Metro ===
28 May and Jafar Jabbarli metro stations are located in this area.
