= Stalik Khankishiev =

Russian chef (born 1962)

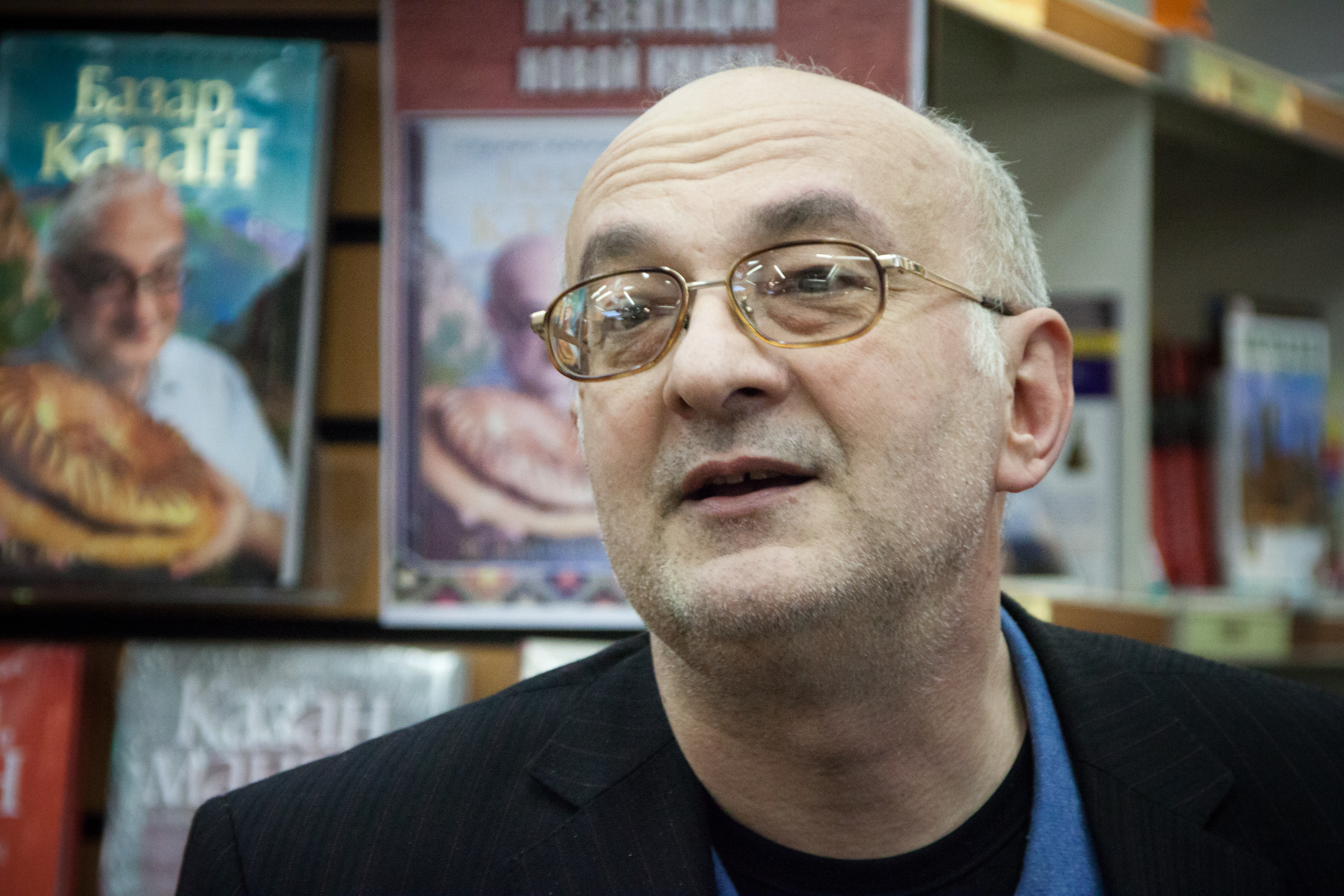
Stalik Hankishiev (2012)

Stanislav Huseynovich Khankishiev, better known as Stalic Khankishiev (Russian: Сталик Ханкишиев; born 2 February 1962), is a celebrity chef, photographer, and cooking writer born in Uzbekistan. He has become well known in the Russian Federation as a result of television appearances and books. He is particularly associated with Central Asian cuisine, but has also popularized dishes from the Caucasus, the Balkans, and Slavic countries.

== Books ==
Khankishiev was born in Fergana in the Uzbek SSR to an Azerbaijani father and a German mother. For many years he worked as a businessman in Uzbekistan, cooking only as a hobby. He has no formal culinary training and has never worked professionally as a chef. He came to prominence by means of a publicity stunt at the Moscow International Book Fair, where visitors were treated to pilaf à Khankishiev, prepared on the street and given away free.

His first book, Kazan Mangal, was enthusiastically received.

Khankishiev's release of his second book took the form of a gala dinner to which film and theater stars, diplomats, businessmen, and journalists were invited. Also in Moscow, Khankishiev held "master classes in eastern cuisine".

== Television and radio appearances ==
Khankishiev's first TV work was on the program Dinner Party on REN TV. He has become known for hosting brief cooking segments on various TV channels. On the channel "Amusement Park" he hosted a segment titled Not a Girl Thing (Неженское дело), featuring "masculine" recipes with an emphasis on meat and outdoor cooking. He has also appeared on Telecafe, NTV, and was a featured guest on the radio program Echo of Moscow.

== Published works ==
- Kazan Mangal. Moscow: Colibri, 2006. и Астрель, 2010
- Kazan, Lamb, and Tablecloth. Moscow: Corpus, Astrel, 2010. Winner of the 2011 Runet Book Award for "Best Seller".
- Bazaar, Cauldron, and Tablecloth. Moscow: AST, 2012. Winner of the 2012 Gourmand World Cookbook Award for "best book about national cuisine". This was the first time that the prize was awarded to a CIS author.
- Mangal. Moscow: AST, 2013.
