= Mughanlo =

Town in Georgia

Mughanlo იორმუღანლო
- Location in Georgia
- Coordinates: 41°35′46″N 45°31′46″E
- Country: Georgia
- Region: Kakheti
- Municipality: Sagarejo

Area
  - Total: 50 km^{2} (19 sq mi)
  - Land: 50 km^{2} (19 sq mi)
- Elevation: 460 m (1,510 ft)

Population (2023)
  - Total: 51,000
  - Density: 1,020/km^{2} (2,600/sq mi)
- Time zone: UTC+4
- Numeric: 3806

Mughanlo is a village in Sagarejo district in Kakheti province in eastern Georgia located 446 m (1,463 ft) above sea level. Only Azerbaijanis live here.

A tornado hit the village in June 2005, injuring 13 people and damaging several homes.

As of November 2006, approximately 600 residents did not possess Georgian identification cards, prompting a visit by Minister of Justice Gia Kavtaradze.

According to the census of 2023 in Georgia the population of the village was 51,000. 51% of inhabitants are men and 49% women. There are 8 mosques in this village. 99% of residents are Muslims. Mughanlo has 7 streets which are Duzagrama, Paldo, Karabaghli, Mughanlo, Lambalo, Tulari and Kazlari.

== See also ==
- Tulari
