= Elmira Akhundova =

Azerbaijani writer, publicist and politician

Elmira Akhundova (born 26 May 1953) is an Azerbaijani writer, publicist and politician. She has been a member of the Association of Azerbaijani Writers since 1983. She was elected to parliament in 2005.

== Early life and education ==
Akhundova was born on 26 May 1953 in the Ramensk district of Moscow. Firstly she studied at school number 18 in Baku, then she went to a state school provided by Baky choreography college. After finishing school, she studied stenography at a technological city school. She graduated from the philology faculty of the Azerbaijan University of Languages in 1976.

== Career ==
=== Writing ===
Akhundova began her career as a stenographer and then worked as an editor for the Committee of Azerbaijani Television and Radio broadcasting from 1977 until 1980. She published her first literary translation – The Heart of Najiba by Huseyn Ibrahimov – in 1978, and her first scientific article in 1979 in the Literaturnıy Azerbaydjan magazine.

Akhundova worked as a reviewer and adviser for the Federation of Azerbaijani Writers from 1980 until 1988. She was then a scientific worker in the department of Southern Azerbaijanian literature in the Literature Institute Nizami, and worked as a reporter for Literaturnaya qazeta, Freedom radio station and Turkish world magazine. She was elected as secretary for the Azerbaijani Writers' Federation in 1991 and as a member of the State Forgiveness Commission in 1995.

Akhundova has been a docent of the translation theory and practise department at Baku Slavic University since 2002. Her compilation and translation Azerbaijan's young prose was published in 1984. Her other books include It is forgiven by rescript (in Russian) in 2000, A death of polygraphic worker in 2001, and Reality moment, Alovsat Guliyev: he was creating a history, This is us and Live time in 2003.

In 2009, her six-volume official biography Heydar Aliyev: Personality and Epoch was released after a decade's research on the national leader.

=== Politics ===
In 2005, Akhundova became a member of parliament after running as an independent candidate in the election for District 71 in Masalli, winning with 29% of the vote over two ruling New Azerbaijan Party candidates. She became a member of the presidential Commission on Pardoning Issues.

Akhundova served as a member of Azerbaijan's delegation to the Parliamentary Assembly of the Council of Europe from 2006 to 2007.

She was appointed the Ambassador of Azerbaijan to Ukraine in March 2020 by the President Ilham Aliyev.

== Awards and honors ==
Akhundova received the H. Zardabi prize for her works. In 2003 she was awarded the Shohrat Order for "the development of popular writing." She was elected as a member of Milli Majlis in 2005.

== Personal life ==
Akhundova is married to Ramiz Akhundov.And has a son Habib Akhundov
