= Azerbaijan–Canada relations =

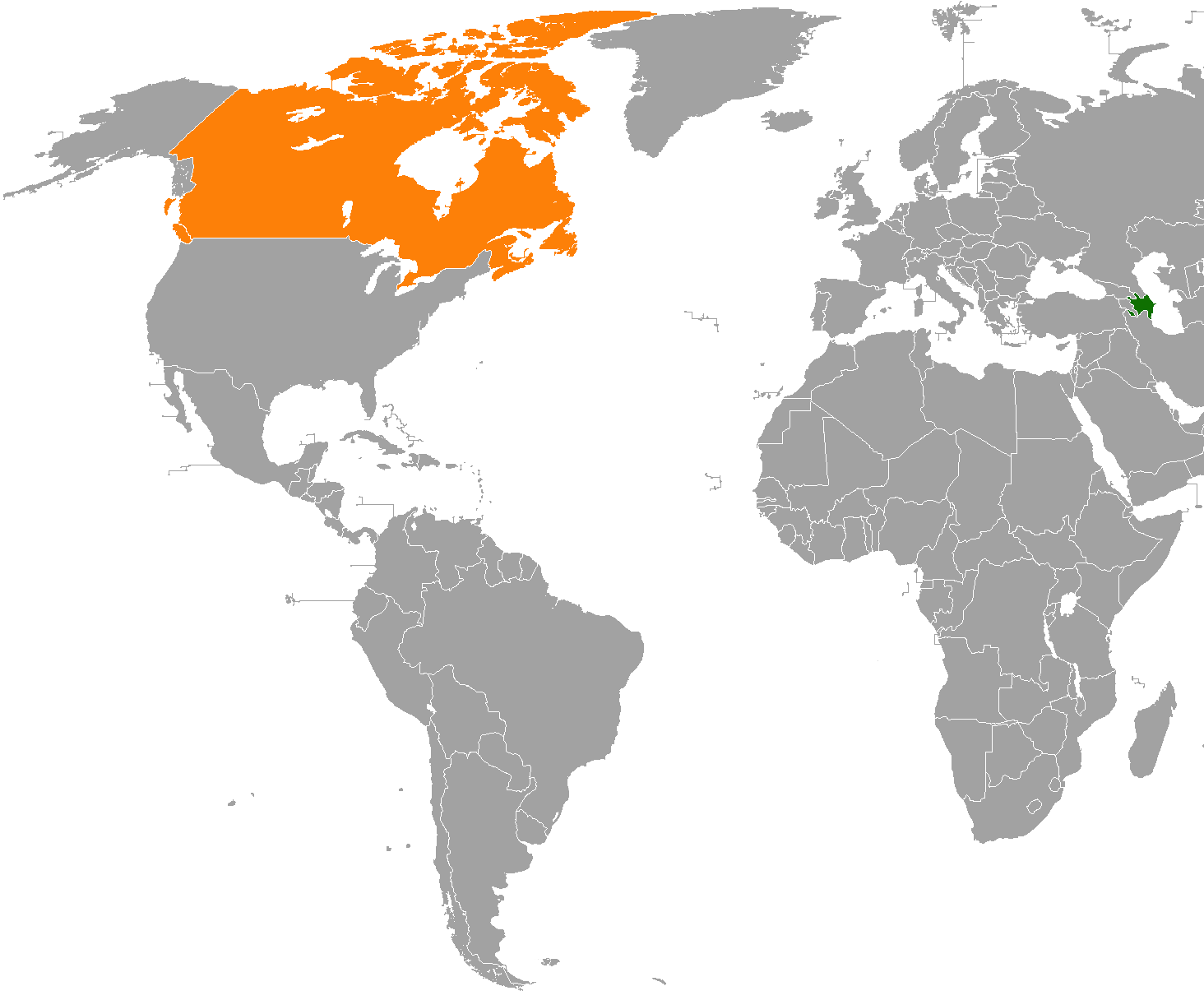

- Azerbaijan: Canada

Bilateral relations exist between Azerbaijan and Canada. Both nations are members of the United Nations.

== Background ==
On October 18, 1991, the Azerbaijani parliament adopted a constitutional act recognizing the independence of Azerbaijan. Subsequently, the Soviet Union fell apart on December 25, 1991, and on that same day Canada recognized the independence of Azerbaijan along with 11 other post-Soviet states. Diplomatic relations between the two countries were established on August 10, 1992.

=== Friendship Group ===
Canada-Azerbaijan Inter-Parliamentary Friendship Group was established in Canada in November 2006, under the chairmanship of Canadian Parliamentary Conservatives Party member Barry Devolin.

Azerbaijan-Canada Working Group on Interparliamentary Relations operates in the National Assembly of Azerbaijan. This working group was established on December 5, 2000 and its first head was Samur Novruzov. Fuad Muradov has been the head of the group since 4 March 2016.

== Economic relations ==
On September 7, 2004, the governments of Canada and Azerbaijan signed a bilateral Convention for the Avoidance of Double Taxation and the Prevention of Fiscal Evasion with respect to taxes on income and on capital.

In 2008, Canada's total import from Azerbaijan reached $1.168.295 billion. The same year Canada's export to Azerbaijan amounted $19.713 million. In 2010, Canadian imports to Azerbaijan were $542 million, down significantly from $1.2 billion in 2009. Merchandise exports to Azerbaijan were also down from $31.0 million the previous year to $20 million in 2010.

According to the State Customs Committee of the Republic of Azerbaijan Commodity turnover between Azerbaijan and Canada, was $2.47 million $ during January–March 2013.

== High-Level Visits ==
Deputy Minister of Foreign Affairs of Azerbaijan Araz Azimov visited Canada, on March 27–28, 2006.

Director of the European Bureau of Foreign Affairs and International Trade of Canada Robert Heyg visited Azerbaijan, on April 16, 2010.

In September 2010, the meeting took place between former Canadian foreign minister Lawrence Cannon and Azerbaijani Foreign Minister Elmar Mammadyarov for discussing the bilateral relations between the two countries on occasion of the 65th anniversary of the UN General Assembly.

The Canadian-Azerbaijani Inter-Parliamentary Friendship Group's constituent meeting was held on March 9, 2016 at the Canadian Parliament. During the meeting, the composition and responsibilities of the Friendship Group were identified, including chairperson, vice-presidents, secretaries and directors. Member of the Conservative Party of the Canadian Parliament, Mr. Jamie Schmale was elected as the chairman of the Friendship Group. During the meeting, the current situations and prospects of development of relations between Azerbaijan and Canada in political, economic and other spheres were discussed.

== Contracts ==
In September 2004, the Convention for the Elimination of Double Taxation and the Prevention of Tax Dissemination was signed between Azerbaijan and Canada.

== Education ==
On "State Program on Education of Azerbaijani Youth Abroad", adopted by Azerbaijan, about 170 Azerbaijani young people were educated at various universities of Canada during 2007–2015.

Former minister of education Mikayil Jabbarov met with a delegation led by the minister of research, innovation and science of Ontario in Canada, Reza Moridi in 2017. Development prospects of Azerbaijan-Canada education, as well as perspectives of cooperation on research and science between universities of Azerbaijan and universities of Ontario were discussed at the meeting.

== Cultural relations ==
Cultural relations between Canada and Azerbaijan increase with every passing day. Over the last few years, numerous events such as concerts and theater performances have been held in both countries.

Various events dedicated to the creativity of prominent figures of culture and art of Azerbaijan such as Muslim Magomayev, Chingiz Sadigov, Alim Gasimov and others were held in Canada at different times.

Spectacle called "Gulnarənin donu" (fr. La robe de Gulnara) which is spoken about life of obligatory — Which is mainly about life of Azerbaijani refugees was demonstrated in various cities of Canada. (Author of spectacle belonging to Isabelle Huber)

"Azerbaijan film Festival" was held in Montreal, Canada on 12–14 September 2014.

On October 24–25, 2015, concert named "Oyan" by National Artist of Azerbaijan Firangiz Alizadeh's was held in Toronto, Canada.

"An Evening of Khojaly Genocide Commemoration" organized by the Alberta Azerbaijani Cultural Society (ALACS) and the University of Calgary's Azerbaijani Student Association (AzSA) was held at the University of Calgary on February 26, 2016.

== Resident diplomatic missions ==
- Azerbaijan has an embassy in Ottawa.
- Canada is accredited to Azerbaijan from its embassy in Ankara, Turkey.

== See also ==
- Azerbaijani Canadians
- Azerbaijan-NATO relations
- Foreign relations of Azerbaijan
- Foreign relations of Canada
