= Azerbaijan America Alliance =

Non-profit organization

The Azerbaijan America Alliance is a non-partisan, non-profit organization providing information broadly about the people, culture, society, industry, history and current events of the Azeri people. The purpose includes research and advocacy on issues of interest to the alliance.

== Mission ==
According to the alliance's website: "The mission of the alliance is to foster an atmosphere of mutual understanding and respect between the people of Azerbaijan and America. Through academic discussion, cultural programming, and political discourse, the alliance aims to become the premier organization dedicated to promoting a lasting partnership between Azerbaijan and the United States."

== Involvement ==
The Azerbaijan America Alliance advocates for Americans to contact elected representatives to educate them on issues related to Azerbaijan.

== Key issues ==
=== Section 907 ===
The alliance has opposed a provision of the 1992 Freedom Support Act, an aid package which excludes Azerbaijan pending Congressional approval.

=== Nagorno-Karabakh conflict ===
The alliance supports United Nations General Assembly Resolution 62/243 from 2008, which reaffirmed the Azerbaijan's territorial sovereignty as related to Nagorno-Karabakh conflict. The organization has advocated for elected leaders to resolve this conflict.

== Activity ==
The alliance has described itself as a grassroots organization.

The alliance promotes academic on Azerbaijan and the larger Caucasus region, and promotes Azeri-American business ties, such as through foreign investment, specifically the energy sector.

The organization has promoted ties to the Congressional Azerbaijan Caucus, co-chaired by Congressmen Bill Shuster (R-PA) and Dan Boren (D-OK).

The Alliance has advocated for "greater recognition and support from [Azerbaijan's] allies in NATO – particularly the United States".

According to the alliance's website, it "supports the development of closer ties between the EU and Azerbaijan."
