= Nəsimi, Sabirabad =

Nəsimi
- Municipality
- Location within Azerbaijan
- Coordinates: 39°53′38″N 48°46′20″E
- Country: Azerbaijan
- Rayon: Sabirabad

Population
  - Total: 702
- Time zone: UTC+4 (AZT)
  - Summer (DST): UTC+5 (AZT)

Nəsimi (until 2004, Xersonovka and Khersonovka) is a village and municipality in the Sabirabad Rayon of Azerbaijan. It has a population of 702.
