= State Committee on Standardization, Metrology and Patents (Azerbaijan) =

State Committee on Standardization, Metrology and Patents of Azerbaijan Republic
- Azərbaycan Respublikasının Standartlaşdırma, Metrologiya və Patent üzrə Dövlət Komitəsi
- Coat of Arms of Azerbaijan

Agency overview
- Formed: November 19, 2008
- Superseding agency: State Agency on Standardization, Metrology and Patents
- Headquarters: 124 Mardanov Gardashlary Street, Baku, Azerbaijan Republic 1147
- Agency executive: Ramiz Hasanov, Chairman of State Committee on Standardization, Metrology and Patents
- Website: www.azstand.gov.az

The State Committee on Standardization, Metrology and Patents of Azerbaijan Republic (Azerbaijani: Azərbaycan Respublikasının Standartlaşdırma, Metrologiya və Patent üzrə Dövlət Komitəsi) is a governmental agency within the Cabinet of Azerbaijan in charge of Azerbaijani technical regulations, metrology, valuation of technical compliance, accreditation, quality standardsin Azerbaijan Republic. The committee is headed by Ramiz Hasanov.

== History ==
In 1906, when Azerbaijan was part of Russian Empire, the authorities established a test point No. 25 in Baku. The chamber of 4 people were in charge of checking and branding decimal scales and weights. In 1909, the first check point of electric meters in the empire was established in Baku. In 1926, the Soviet Azerbaijani authorities instituted mandatory checking of electric meters which were installed throughout the country. Due to developing petroleum industry in Azerbaijan, the need for precise data attracted more attention of authorities and usage of measuring gauges increased. In 1931, Standardization Bureau was established for checking and approving of length and weight measuring devices and new laboratories were opened throughout the country.

In 1966, Standardization Committee was opened and functioned under the jurisdiction of the Cabinet of Ministers of Azerbaijan SSR. A big lab in Ganja and 39 temporary check points were a part of the committee. In 1970, the committee was re-organized and became Azerbaijan SSR Body of Gosstandard of the USSR. After restoration of independence of Azerbaijan, standardization and metrology in the republic was being regulated by the Standardization and Metrology Center of the Cabinet of Ministers of Azerbaijan (AzGOST) established in 1992. On December 27, 2001 President Heydar Aliyev signed a decree No. 623 establishing State Agency on Standardization, Metrology and Patents (AZSTAND). On November 19, 2008, the agency was transformed into the State Committee on Standardization, Metrology and Patents according to Presidential Decree No. 53.

== See also ==
- Cabinet of Azerbaijan
