= Nəsimi, Bilasuvar =

Nəsimi
- Municipality
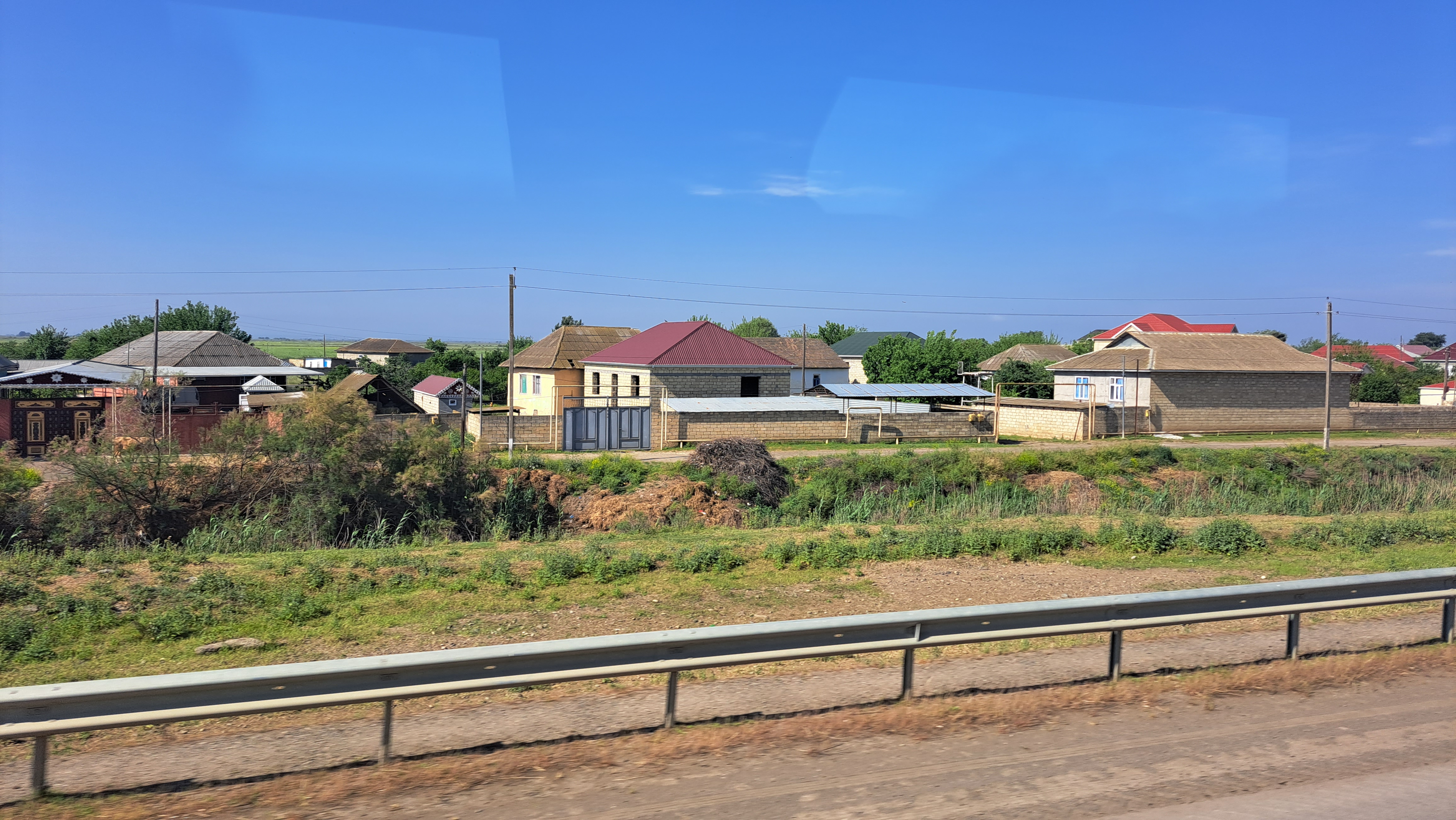

- Location within Azerbaijan
- Coordinates: 39°32′04″N 48°26′55″E
- Country: Azerbaijan
- Rayon: Bilasuvar

Population
  - Total: 3,448
- Time zone: UTC+4 (AZT)
  - Summer (DST): UTC+5 (AZT)

Nəsimi (known as Novotroitskoye until 1991) is a village and municipality in the Bilasuvar Rayon of Azerbaijan. It has a population of 3,448.

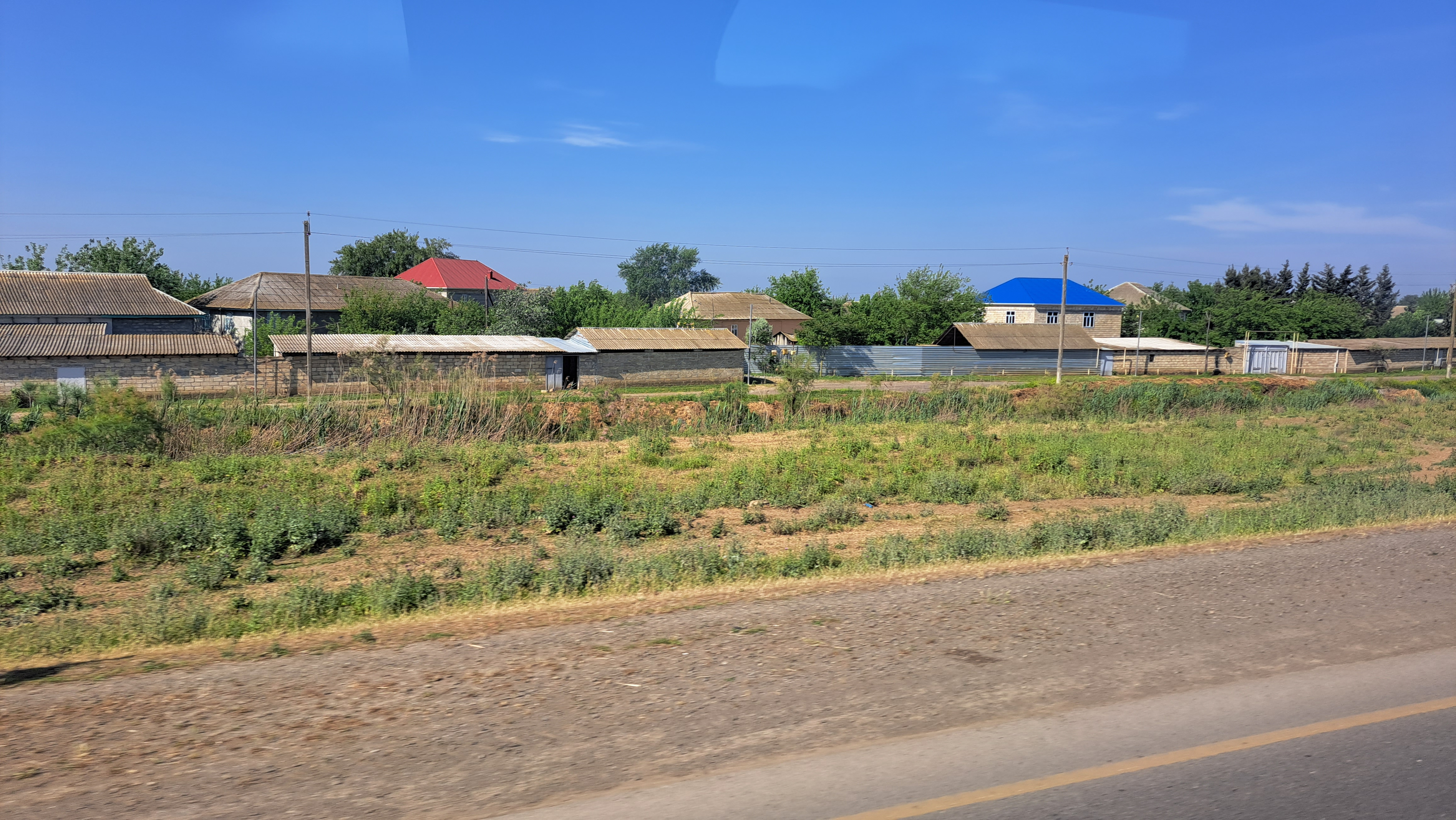
Nəsimi, Biləsuvar
