= Azerbaijan–Bulgaria relations =

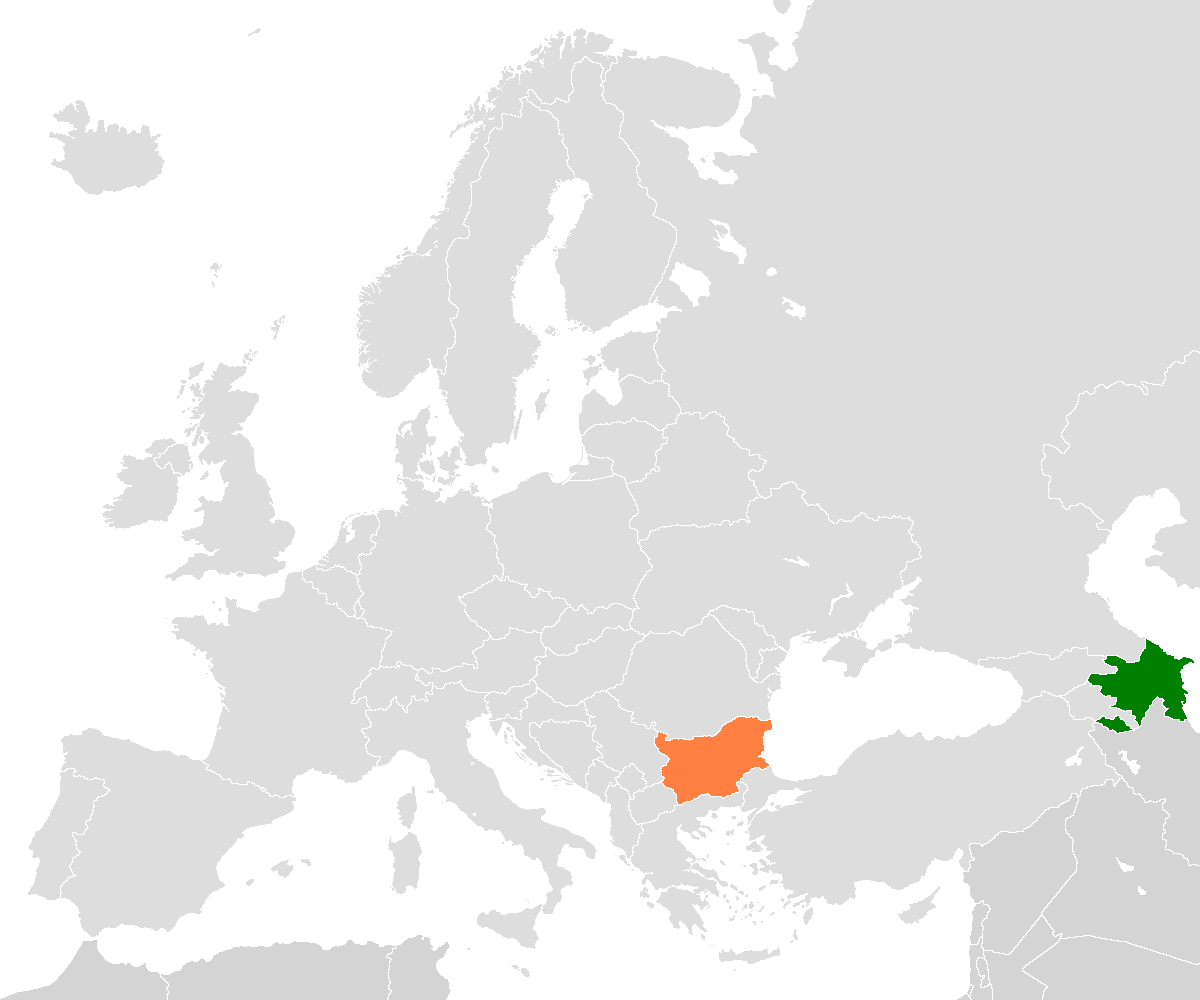

- Azerbaijan: Bulgaria

Bilateral relations exist between the Republic of Azerbaijan and the Republic of Bulgaria in political, socio-economic, cultural and other spheres. Cooperation is carried out in such areas as transport and transit of goods, tourism, pharmaceuticals, agriculture, science and high technologies, education, military equipment, etc. Azerbaijan has an embassy in Sofia. Bulgaria has an embassy in Baku. Both countries are full members of the Organization of the Black Sea Economic Cooperation and Council of Europe.

== Diplomatic relations ==
The Bulgarian government recognized the independence of Azerbaijan on January 14, 1992.

Diplomatic relations between Azerbaijan and Bulgaria were established on June 5, 1992.

The Embassy of Bulgaria in Baku has been functioning since December 1999, while the Embassy of Azerbaijan in Sofia was established in 2005.

On April 16, 2004, Azerbaijani President Ilham Aliyev signed a decree on the establishment of the Azerbaijani Embassy in Bulgaria.

The Ambassador of Azerbaijan to Bulgaria is Nargiz Gurbanova. The Bulgarian Ambassador to Azerbaijan is Nikolay Yankov.

A working group on Azerbaijani-Bulgarian inter-parliamentary relations was established in December 2005.

== High level visits ==
=== Visits of presidents ===
1. On June 29–30, 1995, Azerbaijan's President Heydar Aliyev paid an official visit to Bulgaria.
2. On September 7–8, 1998, Bulgarian President Peter Stoyanov paid a working visit to Azerbaijan to participate in the international conference "Silk Way" held in Baku.
3. On December 2–3, 1999, Bulgarian President Peter Stoyanov paid an official visit to Azerbaijan.
4. On October 7–8, 2004, Bulgarian President George Parvanov paid an official visit to Azerbaijan.
5. On September 23–24, 2005 Azerbaijani President Ilham Aliyev paid an official visit to Bulgaria.
6. On March 10–12, 2008, Bulgarian President Georgi Parvanov paid a working visit to Azerbaijan.
7. On November 13, 2009, Azerbaijan President Ilham Aliyev paid an official visit to Bulgaria.
8. On January 22, 2009, the President of Bulgaria Georgi Parvanov paid a working visit to Azerbaijan.
9. On June 30 – July 1, 2010, the President of Bulgaria Georgi Parvanov paid a working visit to Azerbaijan.
10. On November 14–15, 2011, the President of Bulgaria Georgi Parvanov paid a working visit to Azerbaijan.
11. On September 19–20, 2014, Bulgarian President Rosen Plevneliev paid a working visit to Azerbaijan to participate in the opening ceremony of the Southern Gas Corridor and the event dedicated to the 20th anniversary of the signing of the "Contract of the century".
12. On March 3–5, 2015, President of Azerbaijan Ilham Aliyev paid an official visit to Bulgaria.
13. On April 28–29, 2015, Bulgarian President Rosen Plevneliev visited Azerbaijan to participate in the 3rd Global Open Society Forum in Baku.
14. On June 28–29, 2015, Bulgarian President Rosen Plevneliev visited Azerbaijan to participate in the opening ceremony of the First European Games held in Baku.
15. On March 10–11, 2016, Bulgarian President Rosen Plevneliev visited Azerbaijan to participate in the 4th Global Baku forum.
16. On October 12–14, 2017, Bulgarian President Rumen Radev paid an official visit to Azerbaijan.

=== Visits of Chairmen of parliaments ===
Chairman of the Milli Majlis of Azerbaijan, Murtuz Aleskerov, paid official visits to Bulgaria in September 2004, May 2008.

Chairmen of the National Assembly of Bulgaria paid working visits to Azerbaijan in November 2006, May 2012, September 2018, June 2019.

=== Visits of Prime Ministers ===
Prime Ministers of Bulgaria paid official visits to Azerbaijan in November 2007, April 2012, February 2014, June 2015, January 2018, March 2019.

=== Visits of the Ministers of foreign affairs ===
Ministers of Foreign Affairs of Bulgaria paid official visits to Azerbaijan in November 1997, March 2004, October 2009, December 2012, May 2016, June 2019.

Minister of Foreign Affairs of Azerbaijan, Elmar Mammadyarov, paid working and official visits to Bulgaria in December 2004, April 2008, October 2018.

== Legal framework ==
The legal framework includes more than 70 documents on the implementation of cooperation in the political, commercial, economic, scientific, cultural and humanitarian spheres, signed since 1995.

1. On June 5, 1992, the Protocol on the establishment of diplomatic relations between the Republic of Azerbaijan and the Republic of Bulgaria was signed in Oslo.
2. On June 29, 1995, an agreement on friendship and cooperation between Azerbaijan and Bulgaria was signed in Sofia.
3. On June 29, 1995, an agreement between the Government of Azerbaijan and the government of Bulgaria on air services was signed in Sofia.
4. On June 29, 1995, an agreement between Azerbaijan and Bulgaria on legal assistance in civil matters was signed in Sofia.
5. On November 9, 1997, a Protocol on cooperation between the Ministry of foreign Affairs of Azerbaijan and the Ministry of foreign Affairs of Bulgaria was signed in Baku.
6. On December 2, 1999, the Joint Declaration of the President of Azerbaijan and the President of Bulgaria was signed in Baku.
7. On September 25, 2002, an agreement on military cooperation between the Ministry of defence of Azerbaijan and the Ministry of defence of Bulgaria was signed in Sofia.
8. On November 29, 2011, an agreement on cooperation between the Azerbaijan National Academy of Sciences (ANAS) and the Bulgarian Academy of Sciences was signed in Baku.
9. On April 26, 2012, a Memorandum of understanding between the State oil company of Azerbaijan (SOCAR) and the Bulgarian energy holding in the field of natural gas and oil was signed in Baku.
10. On March 4, 2015, the Joint Declaration on strategic partnership was signed in Sofia.

On November 22, 2019, there was a Protocol on joint activities in the fight against organized crime signed during the meeting between the head of the State Border Service of Azerbaijan – Elchin Guliyev and the head of the Ministry of Internal Affairs of Bulgaria, Mladen Marinov held in Baku.

== Joint intergovernmental commission ==
On May 28, 1999, the joint Commission on trade, economic, scientific and technical cooperation between Azerbaijan and Bulgaria was established. The Commission held five meetings (in 2000, 2004, 2008, 2016 and 2018). The last, 5th meeting of the Commission was held on November 6–7, 2018 in Sofia.

The final protocols of the 4th and 5th sessions of the joint Commission also included an item on illegal activities in the territories of Azerbaijan occupied by Armenia.

Chronology of meetings of the intergovernmental commission
| Meetings | Date | Place |
|---|---|---|
| I session | June 30, 2000 | Sofia |
| II session | October 7, 2004 | Baku |
| III session | September 29–30, 2008 | Baku |

The head of the inter-parliamentary friendship group on the Azerbaijani side is Rauf Aliyev; on the Bulgarian side is Korman Ismailov.

On September 30, 2016, during a meeting of the joint Azerbaijani-Bulgarian intergovernmental commission on trade and economic cooperation, a Memorandum of understanding was signed between the management of the Baku international Commercial sea port (port of Baku) and the Bulgarian port infrastructure company.

== Economic cooperation ==
The basis of economic cooperation between the countries is energy. Starting from 2020, 1 billion cubic meters of Azerbaijani gas will be delivered to Bulgaria via the Greece-Bulgaria gas pipeline (IGB) as part of the Southern gas corridor.

According to the data of the State Customs Committee of Azerbaijan, in the first 9 months of 2014, the trade turnover between the countries amounted to 123 million US dollars.

According to the data of the State Customs Committee of Azerbaijan, the trade turnover between the two countries in January–July 2016 amounted to 16.5 million US dollars.

Since October 2017, owing to commissioning of the Baku-Tbilisi-Kars railway, transport has become another promising area of bilateral cooperation.

Azerbaijan is interested in investing in the construction of a nuclear power plant (NPP) on the territory of Bulgaria.

=== Chronology of business forums ===
On September 21, 2011, within the framework of the visit of the Minister of economy, energy and tourism of Bulgaria E. T. Traikov to Azerbaijan, an Azerbaijani-Bulgarian business forum was held in Baku, which was attended by about 80 entrepreneurs.

On April 27, 2012, as part of the official visit of the Bulgarian Prime Minister E. B. Borisov to Azerbaijan, an Azerbaijani-Bulgarian business meeting of the heads of major Azerbaijani and Bulgarian companies was held in Baku.

On November 5, 2012, within the framework of the visit of the Minister of regional development and public works of Bulgaria L. Pavlova to Azerbaijan, an Azerbaijani-Bulgarian business forum was held in Baku, which was attended by the heads of major companies in the field of logistics, transport and construction.

Trade turnover (in millions of US dollars)
| Year | Import | Export | Turnover | Balance |
|---|---|---|---|---|
| 2014 | 63442.1 | 61154.8 | 124595.9 | -2287.3 |
| 2015 | 12721.6 | 497.9 | 13219.5 | -12223.7 |
| 2016 | 39423.4 | 386.3 | 39809.7 | -39037.1 |
| 2017 | 37274.7 | 153.3 | 37428 | -37121.4 |
| 2018 | 26.41 | 39.47 | 65.88 | 13.06 |

Exports from Azerbaijan to Bulgaria: agricultural products, crude oil, kerosene, liquefied gas.

Imports to Azerbaijan from Bulgaria: agricultural and food products, sweets, medicine, cosmetics, tobacco and papyrus, cotton products, iron products, equipment.

On May 7, 2017, the opening ceremony of the Azerbaijan-Bulgarian chamber of Commerce and industry was held in Baku. The opening ceremony was attended by Bulgarian Vice-President Iliana Iotova, Azerbaijani Ambassador to Bulgaria Nargiz Gurbanova, Bulgarian Ambassador to Azerbaijan Maya Hristova, representatives of the Azerbaijan export and investment promotion Fund (AZPROMO) and the Ministry of economy of Azerbaijan.

According to the database of the UN trade office, in 2018, exports of sodium hydroxide, potassium hydroxide, sodium peroxides or potassium to Azerbaijan amounted to 224 US dollars.

On November 6, 2019, the Minister of Labor and Social Protection of the Population of Azerbaijan, Sahil Babayev, and the Ambassador of Bulgaria to Azerbaijan, Nikolay Yankov, signed an intergovernmental agreement on pension insurance. The document provides for the regulation of issues of pension provision between the countries, payment of social insurance contributions, creates legal conditions for ensuring the receipt of pensions by citizens of the two countries, mutual recognition and protection of pensions of citizens of Azerbaijan and Bulgaria.

On December 11, 2019, the two countries discussed cooperation in the field of cargo transportation to Europe via the Baku-Tbilisi-Kars route and then by ferries to the Black sea through the territory of Bulgaria. It is planned to transport agricultural products, oil products, chemical products and other goods along the Baku-Tbilisi-Kars (BTK) route.

== Tourism ==
According to the agreement between Azerbaijan and the European Union on visa facilitation signed in Vilnius on November 29, 2013, Azerbaijani citizens can enter and leave the country on the basis of a permit-visa application starting from September 1, 2014.

Holders of diplomatic and service passports can stay in the country for 90 days without a visa.

In November 2017, members of the Bulgarian Embassy in Azerbaijan met with representatives of the Azerbaijan Tourism Association (AZTA). The prospects of accreditation of travel agencies to the embassies of both countries were discussed.

Starting from January 2018, Baku-Sofia flights are operated by the budget airline "Buta Airlines".

Recently, the tourist flow between the countries has been significantly increasing.

== International cooperation ==
In the international arena, cooperation between the countries is carried out within the framework of various international organizations: Council of Europe, The Organization for Security and Co-operation in Europe (OSCE), the Black Sea Economic Cooperation Organization, etc. Bulgaria supports Azerbaijan in its integration into the European Union (EU).

Bulgaria supports Azerbaijan in regulating issues related to the Nagorno-Karabakh conflict.

== Cultural ties ==
The Baku Slavic University teaches such subjects as the Bulgarian language (since 1996), the history of Bulgaria, and the culture of Bulgaria. In 2000, the Faculty of Bulgarian studies was founded.

Since 2004, the University has a center for the Bulgarian language and culture. The subject "Azerbaijani multiculturalism" is taught at Sofia University.

On October 7, 2004, a Joint Declaration was signed between the mayors of Shaki and Gabrovo declaring these cities twin cities. Similar links also exist between the cities of Nakhchivan and Veliko Tarnovo.

There are relations between the cities of Sumgait and Burgas at the level of twin cities.

On March 11–15, 2013, an exhibition of works by Azerbaijani artists was held at the Bulgarian National Academy, located in Sofia.

On November 26, 2014, on the occasion of the 90th anniversary of the existence of the Nakhchivan Autonomous Republic, an exhibition of books on the history of the Nakhchivan Autonomous Republic was held at the initiative of the Azerbaijani Embassy in Sofia.

On December 3, 2014, the Embassy of Azerbaijan in Bulgaria jointly with the State Institute of culture of the Ministry of Foreign Affairs of Bulgaria and under the auspices of the Sofia municipality organized a presentation of Azerbaijani silk art of Kelagay in Sofia.

On February 15, 2015, at the initiative of the Azerbaijani Embassy in Bulgaria, a concert of Azerbaijani classical music performed by the Sofia Symphony orchestra was organized in Sofia under the auspices of the Sofia municipality.

On June 2, 2015, at the initiative of the Azerbaijani Embassy in Bulgaria, at the Bulgarian National library of St. Cyril and St. Methodius hosted an exhibition of publications about Azerbaijan.

On September 16, 2015, the Azerbaijani Embassy in Bulgaria jointly with the municipality of Gabrovo organized an exhibition dedicated to the culture of the city of Shaki in Gabrovo.

On November 20, 2015, the Bulgarian Minister of environment and water resources Ivelina Vasileva visited Baku. During this visit there was an environmental program for 2 years (2016–2017) was drawn up.

With the support of the Heydar Aliyev Foundation, the Trapezitsa architectural museum-reserve, located in the administrative center of Veliko Tarnovo in Bulgaria, was restored in 2016. The Heydar Aliyev Foundation also provided financial assistance for the reconstruction of the 158-meter Western Wall, the construction of the 880-meter tourist alley, the cultural heritage Center, the repair of 3 medieval churches, etc.

On September 22, 2016, President of the Heydar Aliyev Foundation Mehriban Aliyeva and Vice-President of the Foundation Leyla Aliyeva attended the opening ceremony of the Trapezitsa architectural museum-reserve.

On September 30, 2017, with the support of the Ministry of culture of Bulgaria, the Ministry of culture and tourism of Azerbaijan, the Embassy of Azerbaijan in Bulgaria, the Bulgarian Cultural Foundation, a conference on the theme "Museums of Azerbaijan. The Museum is an attractive object of cultural tourism".

In 2019, 6 research projects were implemented. At the moment, Azerbaijani and Bulgarian scientists attach importance to the study of the Black and Caspian Sea regions, as well as to conducting archaeological excavations on the territory of both countries.

On July 4, 2019, during the official visit of Bulgarian Culture Minister Kip Bannov to Azerbaijan to participate in the 43rd meeting of the UNESCO World Heritage Committee, a meeting was held between Kip Bannov and Culture Minister Abulfas Garayev. During the meeting, a program of cooperation in the field of culture for 2019–2023 was drawn up.

== Military-technical cooperation ==
It's planned to produce bullet-proof vests together.

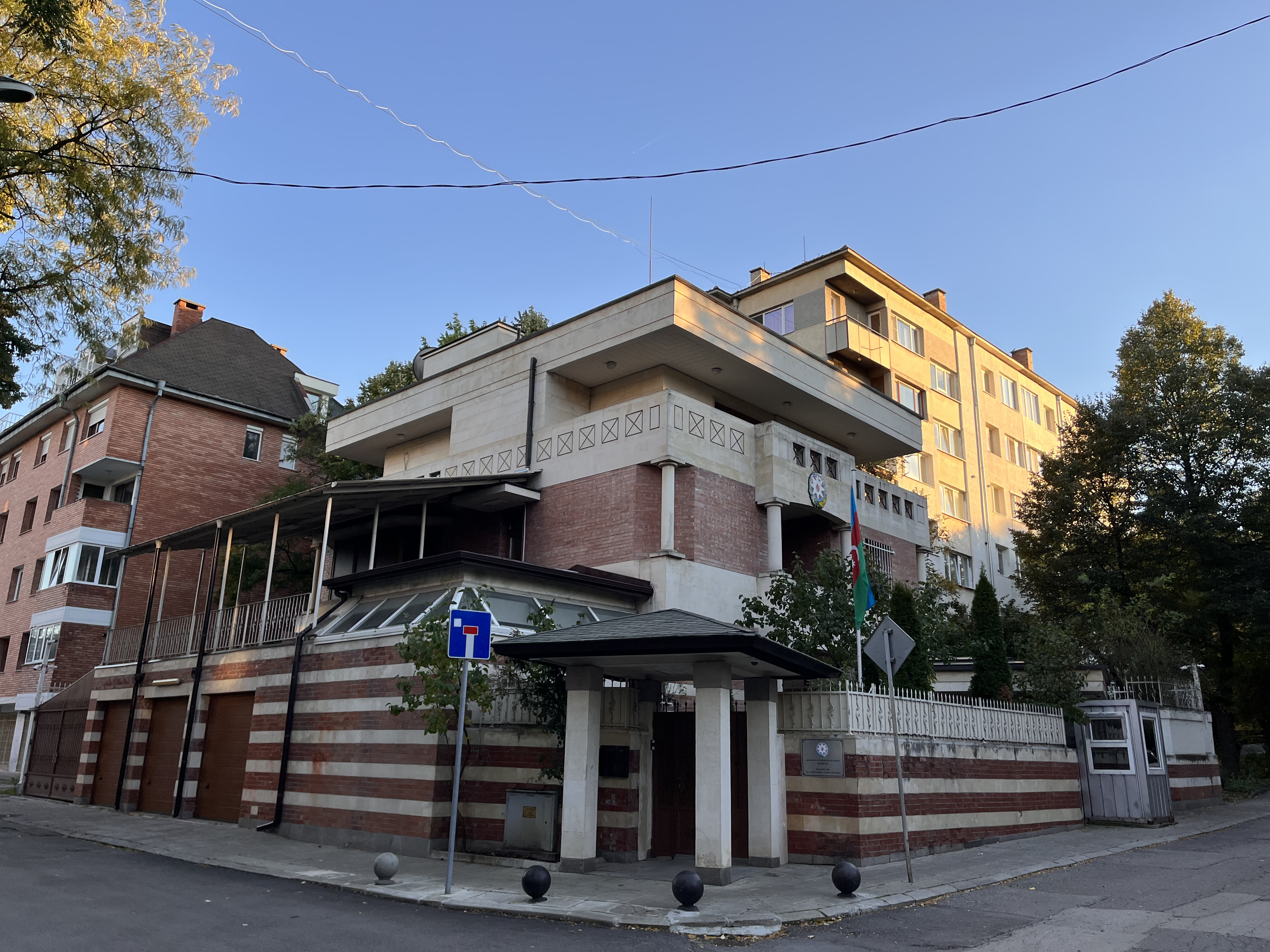
Embassy of Azerbaijan in Sofia

== Resident diplomatic missions ==
- Azerbaijan has an embassy in Sofia.
- Bulgaria has an embassy in Baku.

== See also ==
- Foreign relations of Azerbaijan
- Foreign relations of Bulgaria
- Azerbaijan-NATO relations
- Azerbaijan-EU relations
