= Azerbaijan–European Union relations =

- European Union: Azerbaijan

The Republic of Azerbaijan and the European Union (EU) have maintained a generally positive relationship through the years and have become more closely linked since 1991, although both have faced several challenges in recent years. Azerbaijan is currently part of the European Neighborhood Policy, the Eastern Partnership and the Council of Europe, although the country has announced that it will consider withdrawing from the latter. According to Charles Michel, former President of the European Council, relations between the two are difficult, with significant tensions over issues such as human rights, political dialogue, and regional cooperation.

== History ==
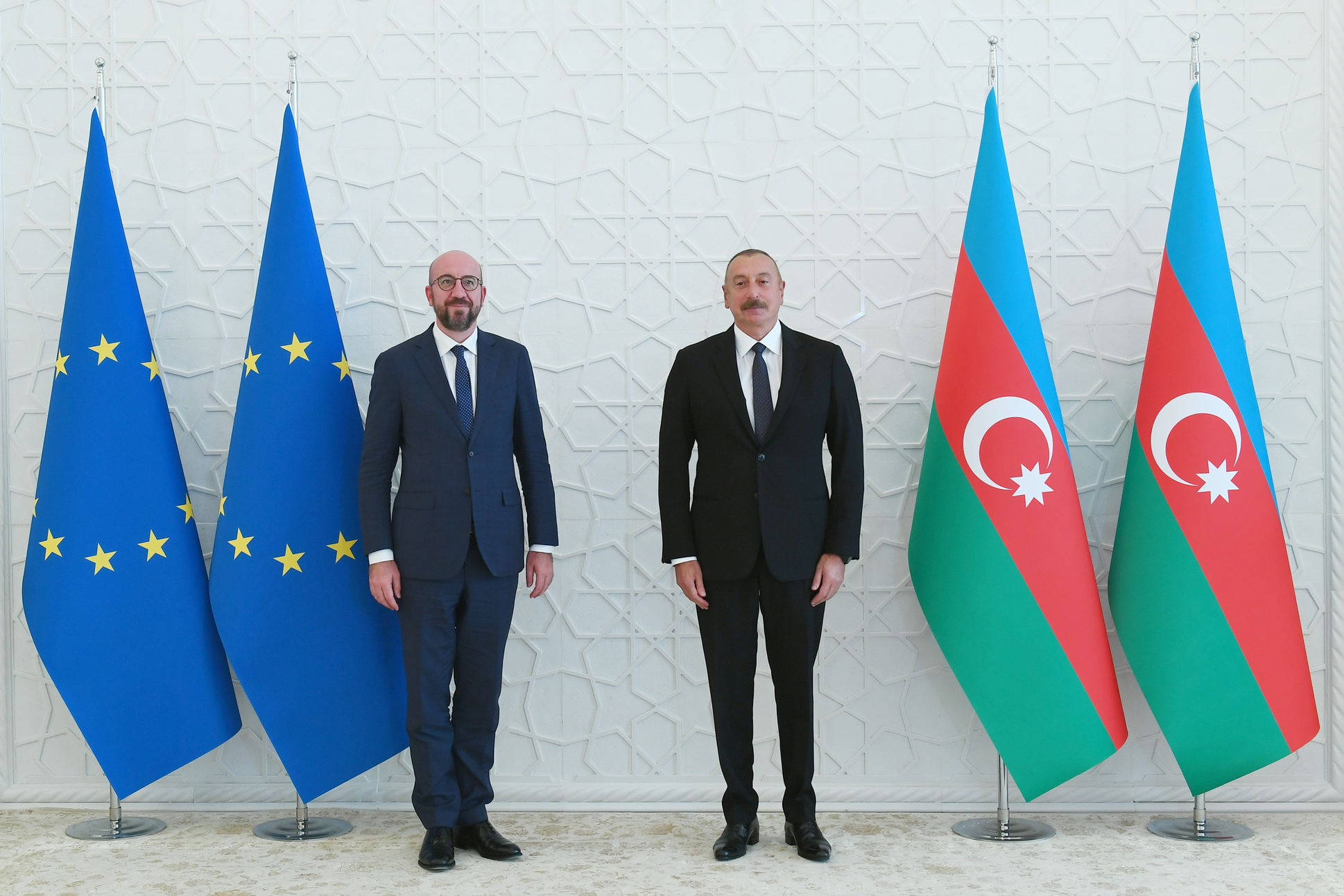
President of European Council Charles Michel meeting in Baku with Azerbaijani President Ilham Aliyev, July 2021

Until the Dissolution of the Soviet Union, Azerbaijan had little contact with non-Soviet Europe. During the Soviet years, the Azerbaijan Democratic Republic (today's Republic of Azerbaijan) became the Azerbaijan SSR. It remained that way until the Azerbaijani Supreme Court declared independence from the Soviet Union in September 1989, only to have this declaration made invalid in November 1989 by authorities in Moscow. The state finally gained independence in October 1991, and joined the United Nations in 1992.

The European Council's Regulation (EC) No 1975/95 of 4 August 1995 provided for food aid to be provided for the people of Azerbaijan and several other post-Soviet countries.

In 1996 formal relations with the European Union began with the signature of the EU-Azerbaijan Partnership and Cooperation Agreement (PCA). This agreement entered into force in 1999.

On January 25, 2001, Azerbaijan became the 43rd state to join the Council of Europe. Since joining, Azerbaijan has ratified 50 treaties.

In July 2003, the EU appointed a Special Representative for the South Caucasus. Since 2004, Azerbaijan has been included (as a southern Caucasus country) in the European Neighborhood Policy (ENP), and since 2009 also in the Eastern Partnership initiative. In 2016, a Protocol on Azerbaijan's participation in EU Programmes and Agencies was adopted. Key items included on the plan are investment in Azerbaijan's infrastructure, partial integration of the Azerbaijani economy into Europe's, and partnerships with Azerbaijan in extracting oil from the Azerbaijan-controlled part of the Caspian Sea.

In February 2017, the EU and Azerbaijan launched negotiations to replace the original agreement adopted 20 years prior.

On January 26, 2023, the Parliamentary Assembly of the Council of Europe (PACE) passed a resolution rejecting the ratification of the credentials of the Azerbaijani delegation. The resolution was adopted with 76 votes in favor, 10 against, and 4 abstentions, barring Azerbaijan’s delegation from participating in most PACE activities. On January 24, 2024, the Azerbaijani delegation to PACE announced at a meeting of the Assembly its decision to cease interaction and presence in PACE until further notice. President of Azerbaijan Ilham Aliyev clarified as well and stated that Azerbaijan will consider leaving and withdrawing entirely from the Council of Europe. Multiple statements from the Azerbaijani side have been released stating that "Azerbaijan no longer needs CoE."

On March 5, 2024, Parviz Baghirov, head of the National Erasmus+ Office in Azerbaijan announced that the Erasmus+ programme would put its activities on an unofficial hold, and that the National Erasmus+ Office would be closed. Baghirov affirmed that the Erasmus Mundus Joint Master’s Degrees would be left unaffected by the circumstances, since the programme is structured differently, as it is aimed at individual candidates. Azerbaijani opposition leaders such as Isa Gambar would go on to speak out against the suspension of activities of the programme. On August 8, 2025, the EU announced that it welcomed the peace agreement signed between Azerbaijan and Armenia, and that the EU fully supports the normalization process between Azerbaijan and Armenia.

== Political relations ==
The EU and Azerbaijan have worked together on various political agreements, the EU-Azerbaijan Partnership and Cooperation Agreement of 1999 being the most important one. The agreement aims at enhancing trade, investment, the economy, legislation and culture within the framework of the EU-Azerbaijan Partnership and Cooperation. Azerbaijan is also the part of the European Neighbourhood Policy (ENP) and the Eastern Partnership initiative, and a member of the Organisation of the Black Sea Economic Cooperation (BSEC).

As of 2018 discussions on updating the legal basis for relations between the EU and Azerbaijan were ongoing.

The Azerbaijani government has been investigated by more than 10 European media organizations and was accused of laundering money to the United Kingdom. The "Azerbaijani Laundromat" consisted of sending 2.5 billion euros to European politicians and Azerbaijani elites; the money was also used to purchase luxury goods. One of the reasons why the laundering took place was because the Azerbaijani government needed to keep a positive image in Europe to gain support for the Southern Gas Corridor. The corridor is a main reason for the laundering and can explain the government's heavy lobbying at the European level. The scandal led to investigations by multiple European institutions. The Parliamentary Assembly of the Council of Europe expelled 13 members for accepting bribes from the Azerbaijani government.

== Economic and financial relations ==
EU-Azerbaijani economic and trade relations are regulated by the Partnership and Cooperation Agreement (PCA). The European Union is Azerbaijan's first trading partner representing 48.5% of Azerbaijan's total trade. The EU's exports to Azerbaijan, which were worth €1.8 billion in 2016, consist primarily of machinery and transport equipment whereas EU imports from Azerbaijan, worth €7.6 billion in 2016, cover mainly oil and gas (98% of total imports). The EU is a key foreign investor in Azerbaijan. In 2013, its Foreign Direct Investment (FDI) in the country was €4.7 billion. The PCA does establish economic cooperation aimed at strengthening business links and developing market-based rules and practices for trade in goods and services. Closer economic integration with Azerbaijan is also followed through the European Neighbourhood Policy (ENP) and the Eastern Partnership initiative of the EU. Azerbaijan is receiving technical assistance from the EU to help it become a World Trade Organization member. EU support to Azerbaijan amounts to around €30 million each year. Non-Government Organisation (NGO) projects under Human Rights, Democratisation and Non-State Actor budget lines (EIDHR and NSA) also get funding.

The EU is the largest foreign grant donor to and investor in Azerbaijan, both in the government sector and civil society, making available over 600 million EURO of bilateral EU assistance since 1992.

EU assistance used to focus on humanitarian aid, food security and social protection. As economic and political conditions in the country have improved dramatically, there is now more emphasis on the European Neighbourhood Policy Action Plan, Non-oil economy, government capacity-building and programmes like INOGATE, TRACECA, TEMPUS, and ERASMUS MUNDUS.

== Opinions ==
As of 2008, Azerbaijan and the European Union shared a common energy agenda, and both support the building of a pipeline to bring Azeri oil to Europe. on November 7, 2008, the European Commissioner for Energy, Andris Piebalgs said, that "recent events in the Caucasus have shown once again that this is a critical time for energy issues in the region and that EU-Azerbaijan energy cooperation should be strengthened now more than ever".

Azerbaijan's president, Ilham Aliyev, stated on April 24, 2004, that "[Azerbaijan's] current strategic choice is integration in Europe, European family and institutions. We are strongly committed to this policy. We will do our utmost so that Azerbaijan meets all standards and criteria peculiar to Europe. Our policy is such and we have been pursuing it for a long time. Current events in Azerbaijan are the results of this continued policy." Aliyev's government sees the benefits of working with Europe and is engaged in welcoming European business, investment, and aid.

The government is focused on developing Azerbaijan with a combination of European and more regional investments. These interests occasionally clash.

In 2016 the President of Azerbaijan Ilham Aliyev responded to a moderator's question at the Munich Security Conference of why Azerbaijan didn't sign an Association Agreement with the European Union:

One of the reasons why Azerbaijan didn’t sign the Association Agreement with the European Union, apart from that according to our impression it was not an agreement it was a unilateral instruction list to us, but the main reason was not that. The main reason was that they did not want to have a very precise wording about the resolution of the conflict between Armenia and Azerbaijan based on the territorial integrity of Azerbaijan. They have these provisions in the agreement with Georgia, with Moldova, at that time Ukraine didn’t have this problem. But when it comes to Azerbaijan it is a double standard. Russia was sanctioned for what happened in Ukraine. Armenia was not sanctioned for what happened in Nagorno-Karabakh. This double standard approach must be eliminated.

In a 2023 poll by think-tank the Agora Analytical Collective directed towards young Azeris it was determined that 61% of them supported joining the European Union, compared to the Eurasian Economic Union which appealed only to the 3,3% of pollsters.

== Present situation ==
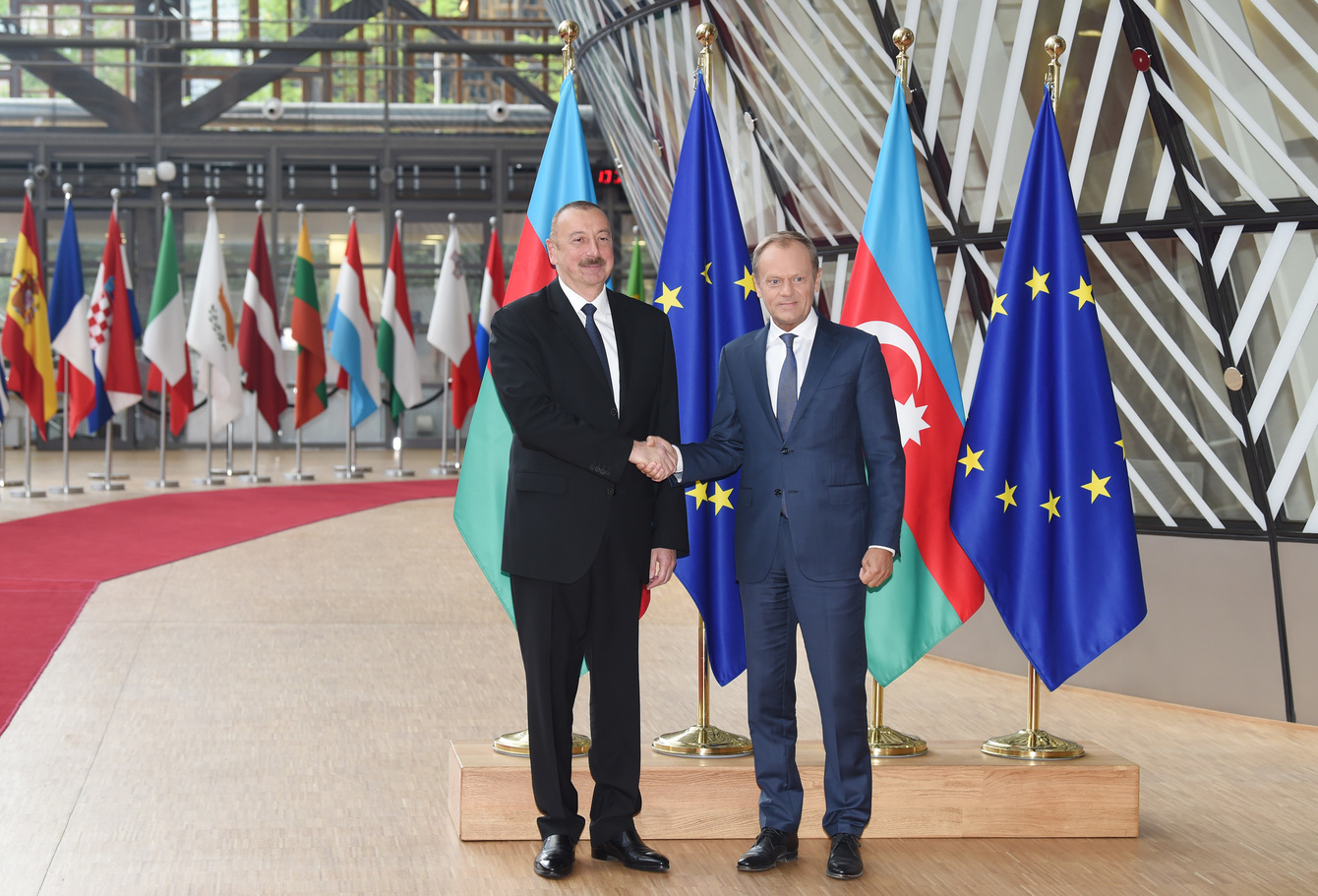
Azerbaijani President Ilham Aliyev meet with President of the European Council Donald Tusk with Brussels, Belgium, July 2018.

Azerbaijan and the European Union have similar beliefs on most policies and are presently working together to forward their combined interests. The European Community developed a three-year aid plan for Azerbaijan, called the National Indicative Program (NIP), with a budget of €92 million over three years (2007–2010). The main goals of this program are to develop government agencies, run them more efficiently, and help Azerbaijan to develop its internal infrastructure to promote foreign investment and business. The EU has also set up a European Instrument for Democracy and Human Rights (EIDHR) office in Baku to give advice to Azerbaijan's government and to make sure that human rights are protected.

As of 2008, the European Union and Azerbaijan were working together on a number of energy projects. The main project is the building of a pipeline to connect the Caspian oil and gas supply to Europe. Europe has been supporting Azerbaijan's state-sponsored program for the increased use of alternative and renewable energy sources. Azerbaijan is a partner country of the EU INOGATE energy programme, which has four key topics: enhancing energy security, convergence of member state energy markets on the basis of EU internal energy market principles, supporting sustainable energy development, and attracting investment for energy projects of common and regional interest. In 2013, the EU and Azerbaijan negotiated to replace their existing PCA with an Association Agreement (AA). Roland Kobia, the EU's ambassador to Azerbaijan, said in April 2013 that they could be completed prior to the Eastern Partnership meeting in November 2013. However, the Deputy Chief of Azerbaijan's presidential administration stated that "we aim to draft a partnership agreement – a document more adequately reflecting the level of our relations and cooperation with the European Union" rather than an AA. An EU official from the delegation to Azerbaijan stressed that "it has not been said that Azerbaijan will never sign it, just it is not right time to sign it now. So we are working with Azerbaijan on possible other formats but the final objective is to sign an association agreement." No AA was initialled at the summit, though a Joint Declaration stated that the EU was willing to negotiate a Deep and Comprehensive Free Trade Agreement with Azerbaijan once they join the World Trade Organization. In December 2013, EU Commissioner for Enlargement Štefan Füle said that negotiations on the AA continued. In November 2016 the European Council authorized the launch of negotiations on a framework agreement, which "allows Azerbaijan to decide the extent in which it will participate in the EU's offer of political association and economic integration".

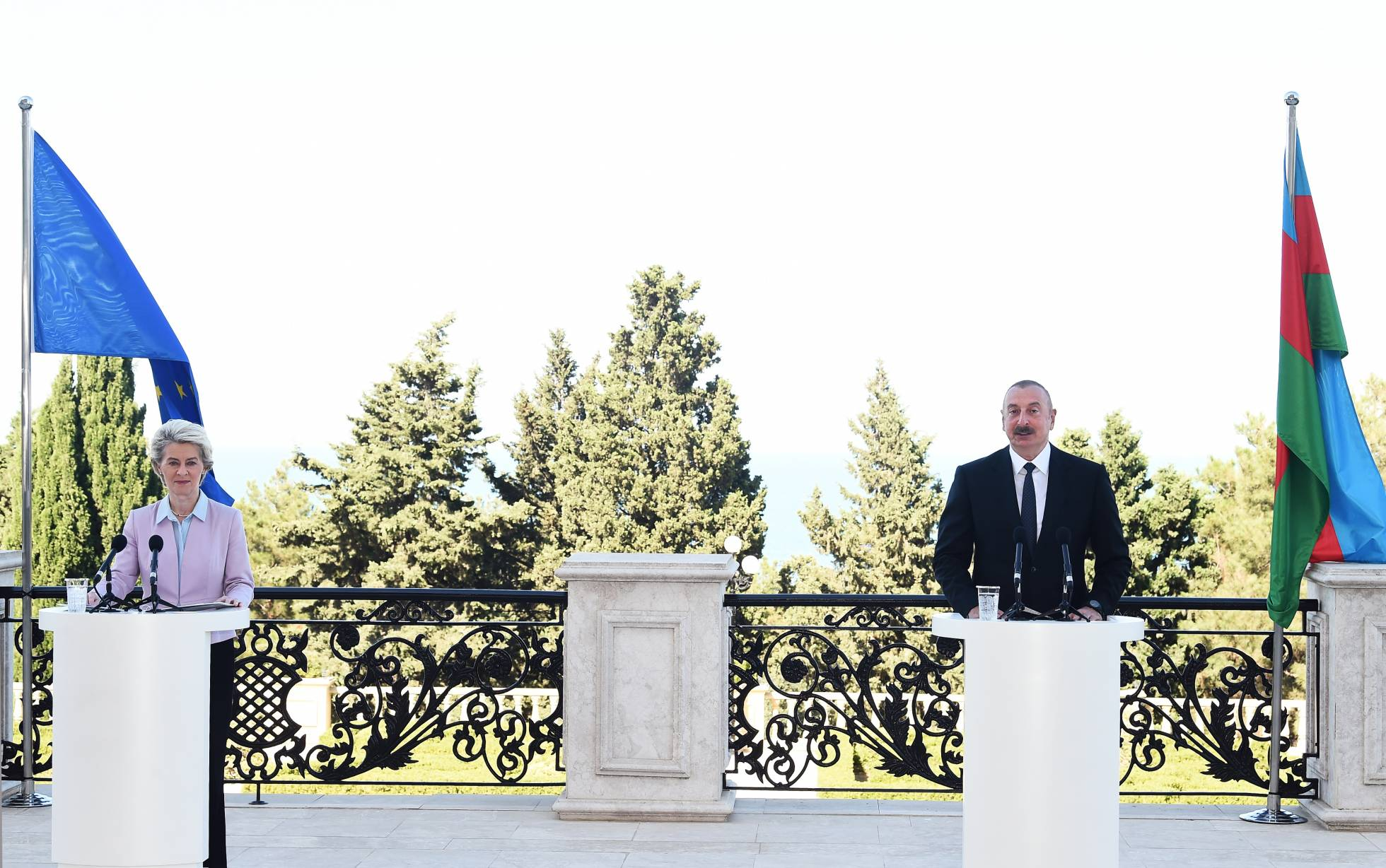
Aliyev meeting with President of the European Commission Ursula von der Leyen, July 2022

In November 2013, an agreement on the facilitation of visa issuance was signed between Azerbaijan and the European Union in Vilnius, Lithuania and came into force on 1 September 2014. According to the agreement, visa handling is fee-free for particular groups of citizens such as official delegates, pensioners, children under 12, students and researchers.The agreement is not in effect in the UK, Ireland, and Denmark.

On 27 September 2020, President of the European Council Charles Michel expressed deep concern over the escalation of hostilities in the disputed region of Nagorno-Karabakh and called on Azerbaijan and Armenia to immediately halt fighting and progress towards a peaceful resolution. In October 2020, EU's Foreign Affairs chief Josep Borrell called on Armenia and Azerbaijan to cease fighting and return to the negotiating table.

In July 2022, the European Commission signed an agreement with Azerbaijan to increase natural gas imports.

== Energy cooperation ==
=== "Southern Gas Corridor" ===
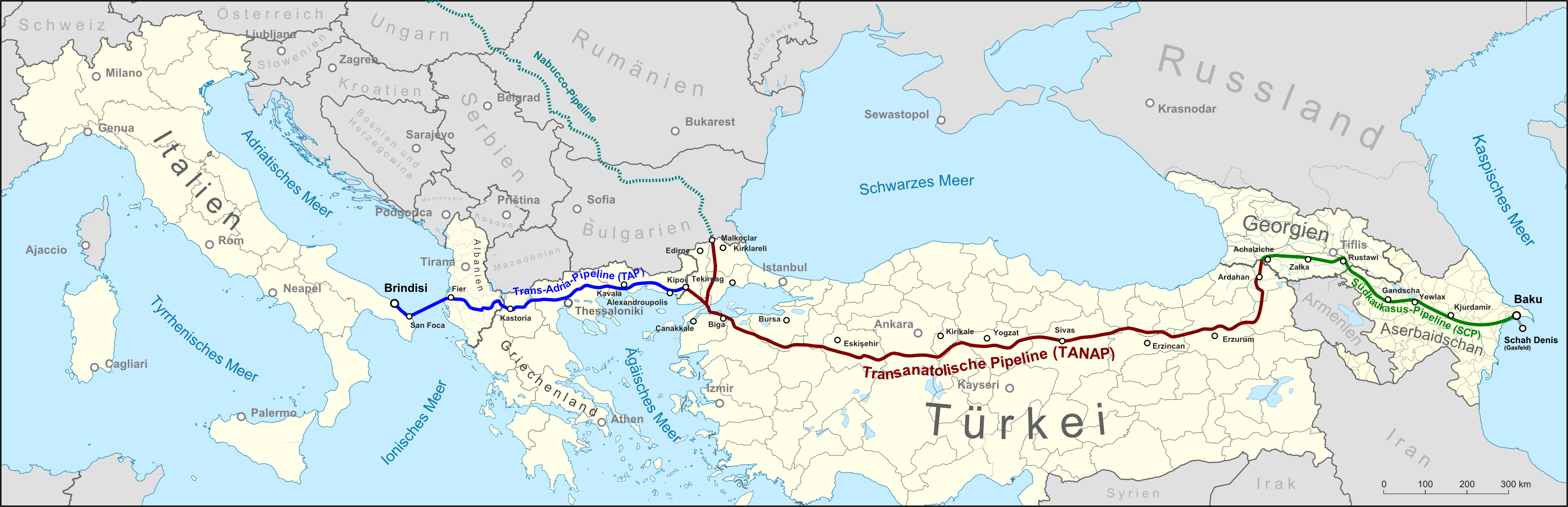
The goal of the Southern Gas Corridor, which connects the giant Shah Deniz gas field in Azerbaijan to Europe, is to reduce Europe's dependency on Russian gas.

President of the European Commission José Manuel Barroso and President Aliyev signed a Joint Declaration on the Southern Gas Corridor back in January 2011 in Baku. The Southern Gas Corridor is a strategic initiative to bring Caspian, Central Asian, and Middle Eastern gas resources to the European markets and is the main diversification tool for the security of energy supply. The infrastructure that is to bring gas from the Caspian basin, notably from Shah Deniz II field, consists of the expansion of the existing South-Caucasus pipeline from Azerbaijan via Georgia to Turkey; the Trans-Anatolian pipeline, crossing Turkey and connecting Georgia with Europe; and the Trans-Adriatic pipeline, transporting gas from the Turkish border via Greece and Albania to Italy. A giant offshore gas field in the Azerbaijani sector of the Caspian Sea – Shah Deniz II will provide initial ten billion cubic metres of gas per year to the European markets as of 2020 and an additional six billion cubic metres per year to Turkey. The Southern Gas Corridor is the most significant and ambitious undertaking of international hydrocarbon industry as numerous stakeholders including 7 governments and 11 companies have been involved in it. Southern Gas Corridor will alter the energy map of whole Europe by providing gas supplies of the Caspian Sea throughout European markets. Initially, nearly 10 billion cubic meters (bcm) of gas will flow across this network in 2019–2020.

Building Southern Gas Corridor, European countries and companies support gas export from Azerbaijan and contribute to finance Azerbaijan's government. The Aliyev regime is considered by many NGOs and watchdogs organizations as repressive and activists and journalists are regularly arrested on false charges and imprisoned. The International Federation for Human Rights (FIDH) wrote in 2015, that "for more than a decade Azerbaijan has made shameless use of caviar diplomacy to charm European governments, its most important oil and gas clients". The CEE BankWatch warns that "Developing Shah Deniz stage 2 and the Southern Gas Corridor is likely to cement further the oppressive structures of the Aliyev government".

== Azerbaijan's foreign relations with EU member states ==
- Austria
- Belgium
- Bulgaria
- Croatia
- Cyprus
- Czech Republic
- Denmark
- Estonia
- Finland
- France
- Germany
- Greece
- Hungary
- (Republic of Ireland) Ireland
- Italy
- Latvia
- Lithuania
- Luxembourg
- Malta
- Netherlands
- Poland
- Portugal
- Romania
- Slovakia
- Slovenia
- Spain
- Sweden

== See also ==
- Potential enlargement of the EU
- Azerbaijan–NATO relations
- Armenia-EU relations
- Georgia-EU relations
- Moldova-EU relations
- Russia-EU relations
- Turkey-EU relations
- Ukraine-EU relations
