= Azerbaijanis in France =

- (Azerbaijan) (France)

Total population
- 1.112 (asylum-seekers), 5,700 (2017)

Regions with significant populations
- Paris, Alsace, Bordeaux, Marseille

Languages
- Azerbaijani, French, Turkish, Persian

Religion
- Shia Islam

Azerbaijanis in France (Azerbaijani: Fransa azərbaycanlıları) is a small Azerbaijani diaspora in France, are French citizens and permanent residents of ethnic Azerbaijani background. Most Azerbaijani-France have immigrated to France from the Republic of Azerbaijan and Iran.

== History ==
The migrations of Azerbaijanis to France began in the late 19th and early 20th centuries. They are mostly asylum-seekers or political refugees, who came to France following the Iranian Revolution in 1979.

The strengthening of France's position in Europe has accelerated the migration of the Azerbaijanis to this country since the end of the 19th century. Azerbaijani millionaires such as Haji Zeynalabdin Tagiyev, Musa Nagiyev, Shamsi Asadullayev, and French businessmen created business together in France.

After the end of the Azerbaijan Democratic Republic in 1920, France was one of the 10 countries where Azerbaijani migrants settled. Famous Azerbaijanis such as Alimardan Topchubashov, Ali bey Huseynzade, Jeyhun Hajibeyli, Umbulbanin settled in France.

After the declaration of independence of Azerbaijan in 1991, the establishment of bilateral relations between France and Azerbaijan affected the activities of the Azerbaijani diaspora. The books "Karabagh history and the present period", "Karabagh" (collection of articles), "Nagorno-Karabagh", "History of Nagorno-Karabakh and its documents" were published in France.

== The Azerbaijani-French Youth Association (AFYA) ==
The Azerbaijani-French Youth Association (AFYA) was established in 2003 by a group of Azerbaijani students studying in Paris. The first president of the association was Babek Ismailov, who studied in Paris at that time. In the following years, Mirvari Fataliyeva was the head of the organization. More than 50 AFYA members are Azerbaijanis, French and foreigners living in France. The main purpose of AFYA is to strengthen friendly relations between Azerbaijan and France, as well as to support the development of economic, scientific and cultural relations, along with sharing information about Azerbaijani culture, history, successes and even problems. The organization carries out activities and projects in Paris, as well as in different cities of France. Chairman of Azerbaijani-French Youth Association is Vusala Mammadzadeh.

== The Azerbaijan Cultural Center ==
The Azerbaijan Cultural Center has been operated in Strasbourg since 1990. The aim of the Cultural Center is to serve protection of the culture and folklore of Azerbaijani people by organizing cultural events and national holidays. Chairman of the Azerbaijan Cultural Center is Ahmed Mehribani.

== The Society of Azerbaijani Students of France ==
The Society of Azerbaijani Students of France (SASF) was established in 1999 in Strasbourg. The main principles of the Association are to bring together Azerbaijani students studying and graduating in France, to demonstrate the truth about Azerbaijan, January 20, Khojaly tragedy, March 31, the Genocide of Azerbaijanis both to the French public and to the whole world. The Association prepares programs and articles about Azerbaijan and its problems on radio and television channels as well as web pages. Chairman of the Azerbaijani Students Association in France is Mammad Ismayilov.

== Strasbourg "Azerbaijan House" ==
"Azerbaijani House" was founded in May 2005 in Strasbourg. The aim of the Strasbourg "Azerbaijani House", which combines 3 communities the Society of Cultural Relations with Azerbaijan, the Azerbaijan Cultural Center, the Society of Azerbaijani Students is to bring together Azerbaijanis living in the region, to help operate as a united diaspora and to promote the history, culture and art of Azerbaijan, to show the truth about it to the local community. The society has been operated in the center of Strasbourg and 500 meters from the Council of Europe since February 16, 2007. Chairman of the "Azerbaijani House" Society is Mustafa Alinca.

== See also ==
- Azerbaijan–France relations
- Iranians in France
- Turks in France
- Adile Aliyeva
