= Austria–Azerbaijan relations =

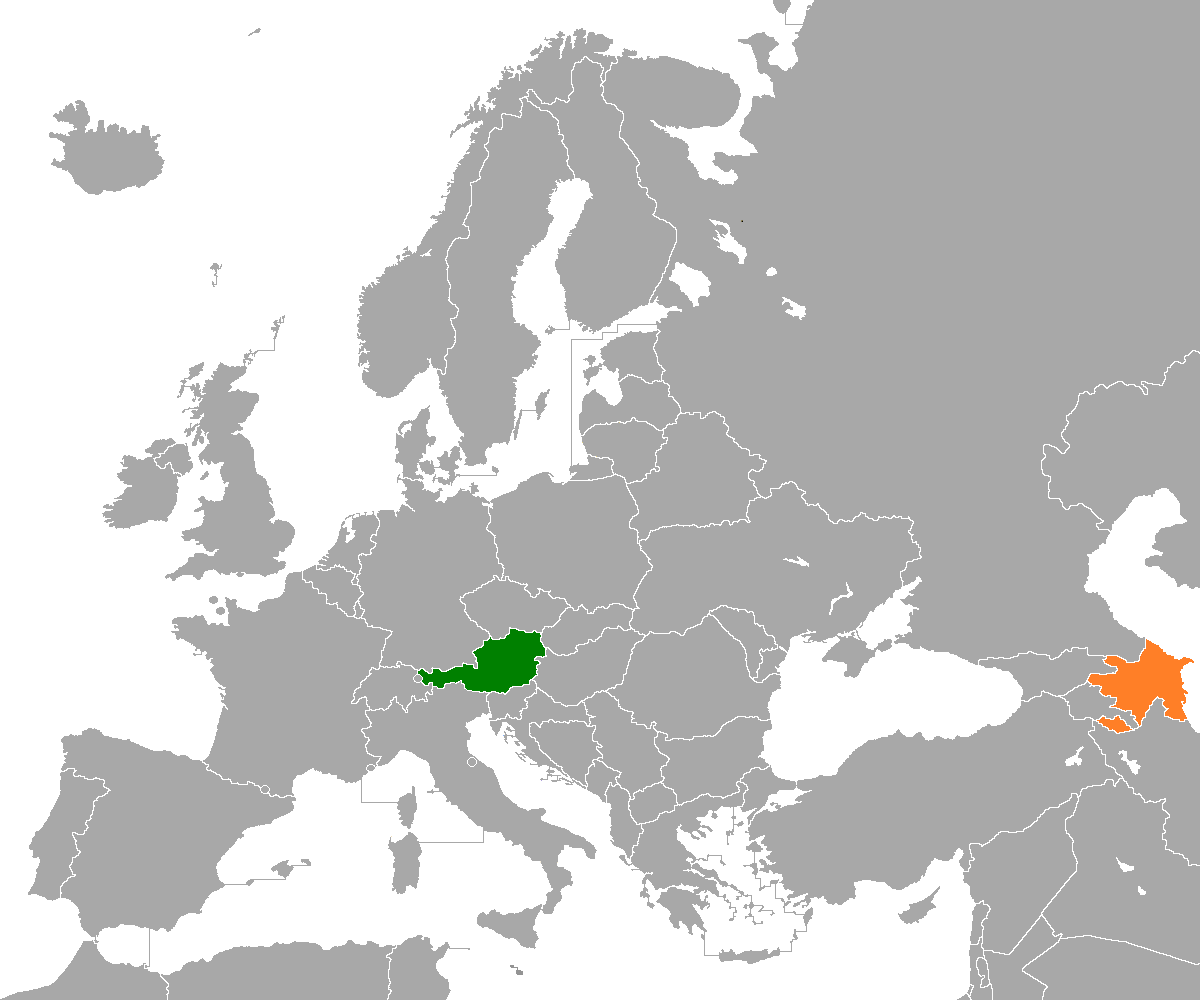

- Austria: Azerbaijan

Diplomatic mission
- Embassy of Austria, Baku: Embassy of Azerbaijan, Vienna

The diplomatic relations between Austria and Azerbaijan were established in 1992 after Austria recognized the independence of Azerbaijan. Austria have an embassy in Baku. Azerbaijan has an embassy in Vienna. Both countries are full members of the Council of Europe.

== Overview ==
Austria recognized the independence of Azerbaijan on January 15, 1992. On February 20, 1992 diplomatic relations between Azerbaijan and Austria were established.

The Embassy of Azerbaijan to Austria was opened in September 1995. The embassy is also accredited to Slovakia, Slovenia and operates as the Permanent Mission of the Republic of Azerbaijan to OSCE. Galib Israfilov was appointed as the ambassador of Azerbaijan to Austria, Slovakia and Slovenia in 2011 by President Ilham Aliyev. He also serves as the Permanent Representative of Azerbaijan to OSCE and Vienna based UN organizations.

Austria opened its embassy in Baku in July 2010. Alexander Bayerl was appointed as the ambassador in 2018.

== High-level visits ==
The president of Azerbaijan Ilham Aliyev visited Austria in 2011. Ministers of Trade (1997), Internal affairs (2000), Youth and sport (2001), Justice (2004), Education (2004, 2010), Foreign affairs (2005, 2010, 2012), Culture and tourism (2006, 2009) of Azerbaijan visited Austria, while Austrian ministers of Foreign affairs (1999), Internal affairs (2003), Justice (2003), Economy and labor (2009), Europe and International affairs (2011) visited Azerbaijan.

== Inter-parliamentary relations ==
The inter-parliamentary cooperation between the two countries is carried out by the Working Group on Azerbaijan-Austria inter-parliamentary relations from Azerbaijan. Milli Majlis established the Working Group on Azerbaijan-Austria inter-parliamentary relations on 5 December 2000. According to the decision of Milli Majlis dated 4 March 2016, the head of the Working Group on Azerbaijan-Austria inter-parliamentary relations is Javid Gurbanov. The head of the working group from the Austrian side is Carl Ollinger.

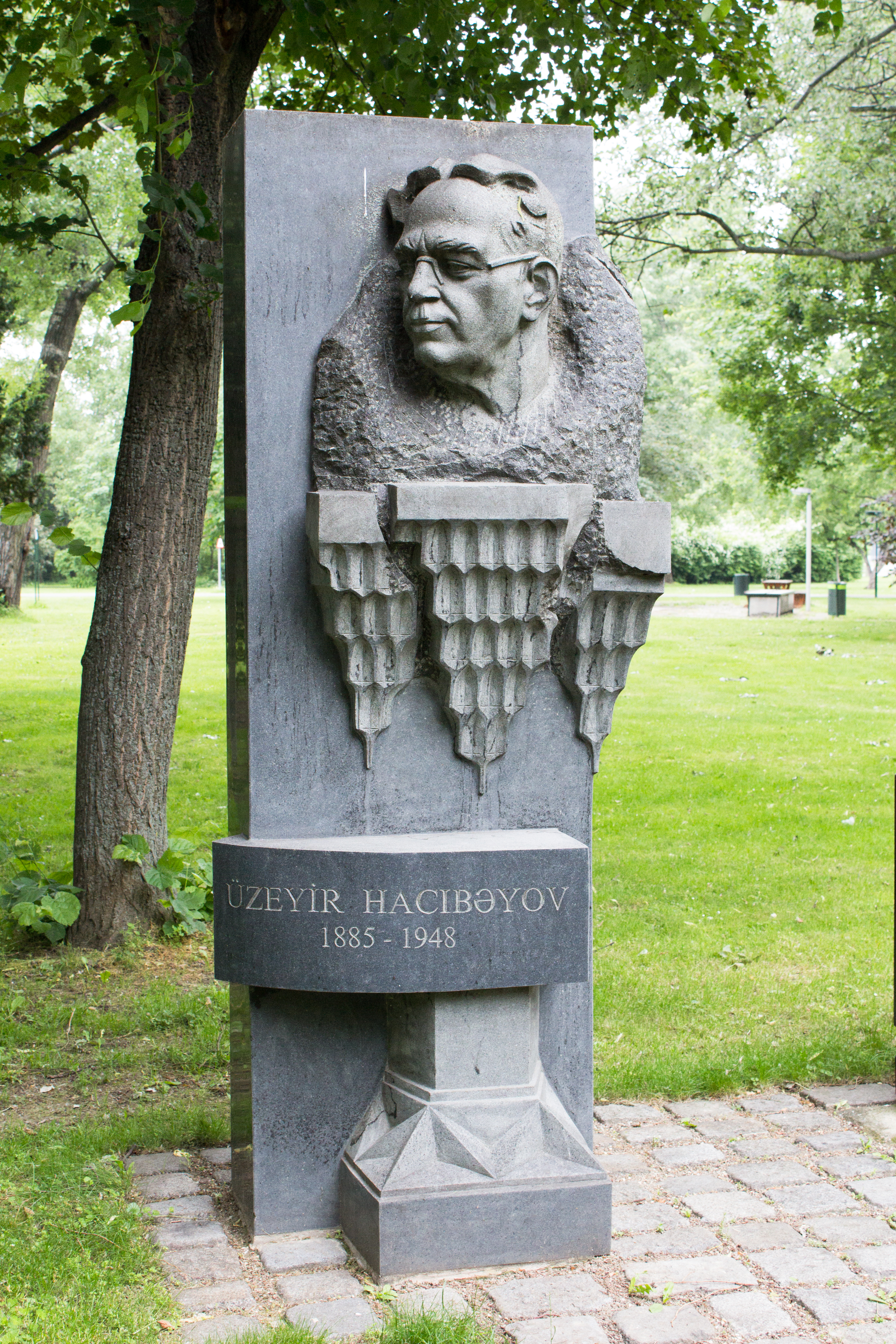
Uzeir Hajibeyov's monument in Vienna

== Economic relations ==
Trade turnover between Austria and Azerbaijan (in thousand USD)
Year	2005	2006	2007	2008	2009	2010	2011	2012	2013	2014	2015	2016	2017
Turnover	25,966.8	42,559.7	49,165.9	73,375.7	72,459.0	88,353.0	97,548.5	264,582.8	488,751.9	434,335.1	525,791.4	170,377.0	199,917.7
Extracted from stat.gov.az

== Cultural relations ==
Azerbaijan-Austria friendship societies operating in Vienna, Graz, Salzburg and Linz have a significant role in developing cultural relations between Austria and Azerbaijan. Days of Azerbaijani Culture were organized in Austria in 2002 and 2005. A monument to the great Azerbaijani composer Uzeyir Hajibeyov was erected in Vienna. “Arshin Mal Alan” musical comedy by Uzeyir Hajibeyov was staged at Vienna Chamber Opera Theater.

== Resident diplomatic missions ==
- Austria has an embassy in Baku.
- Azerbaijan has an embassy in Vienna.
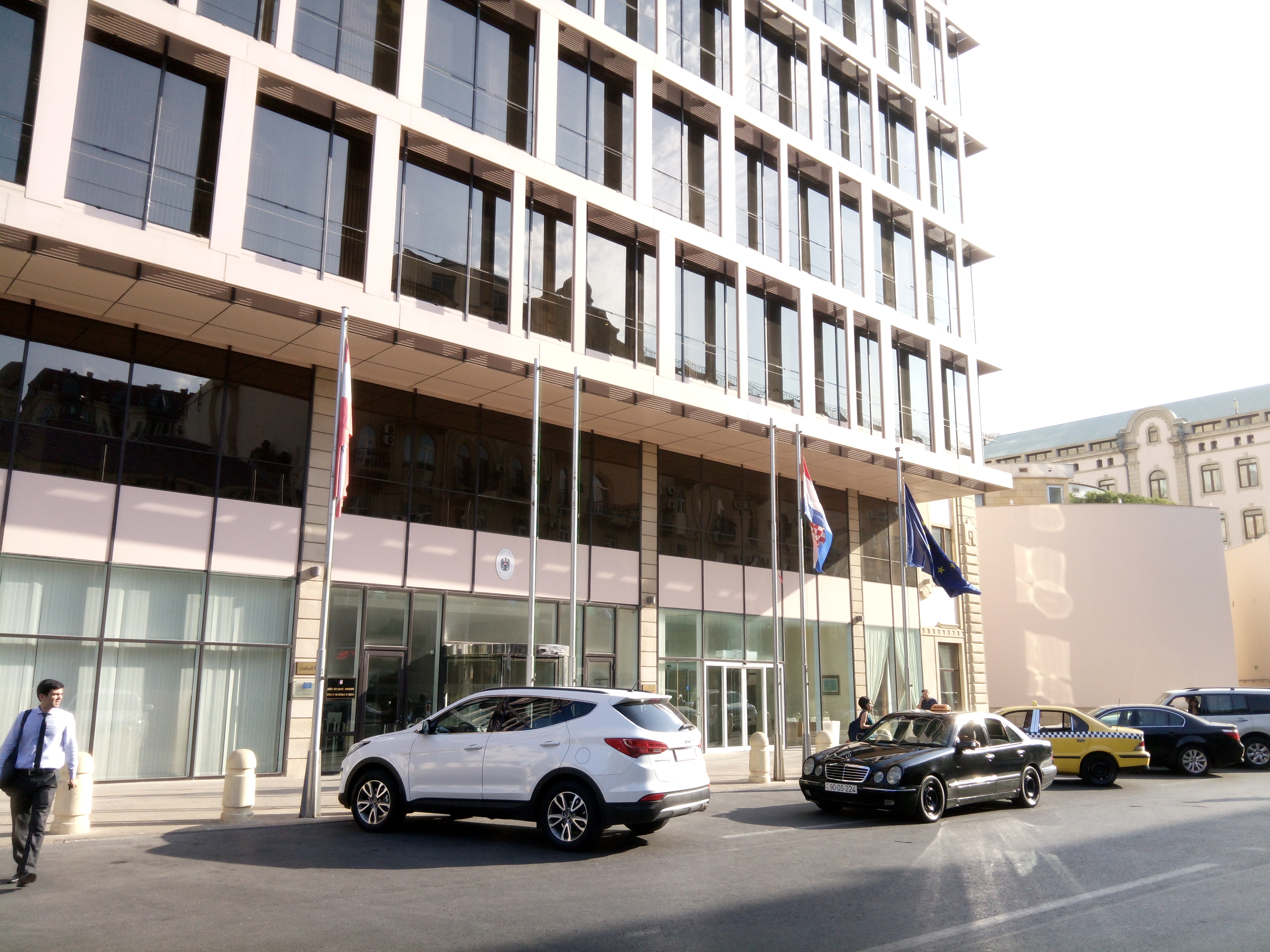
Embassy of Austria in Baku

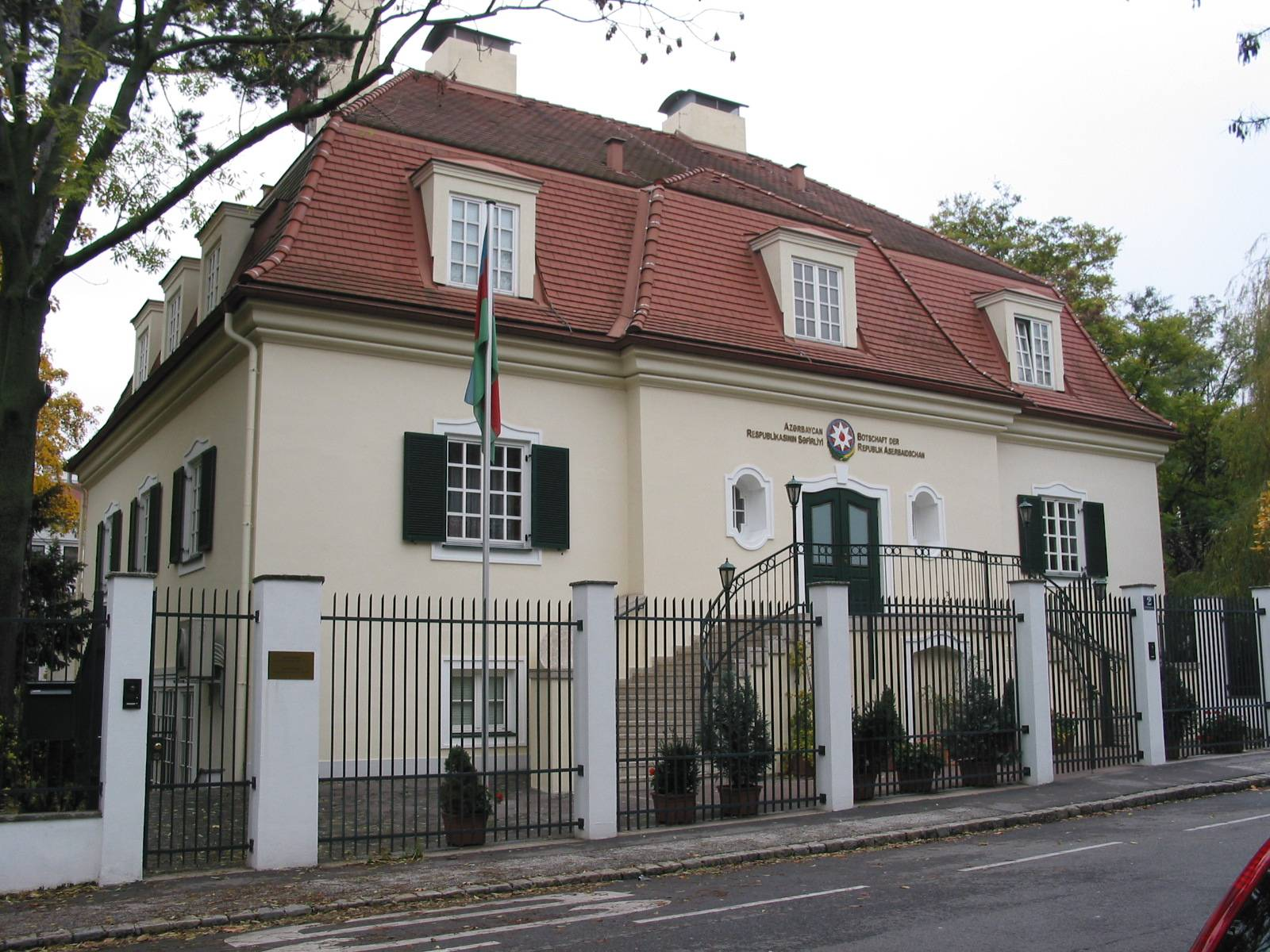
Embassy of Azerbaijan in Vienna

== See also ==
- Foreign relations of Austria
- Foreign relations of Azerbaijan
- Azerbaijan-EU relations
