= Azerbaijan–France relations =

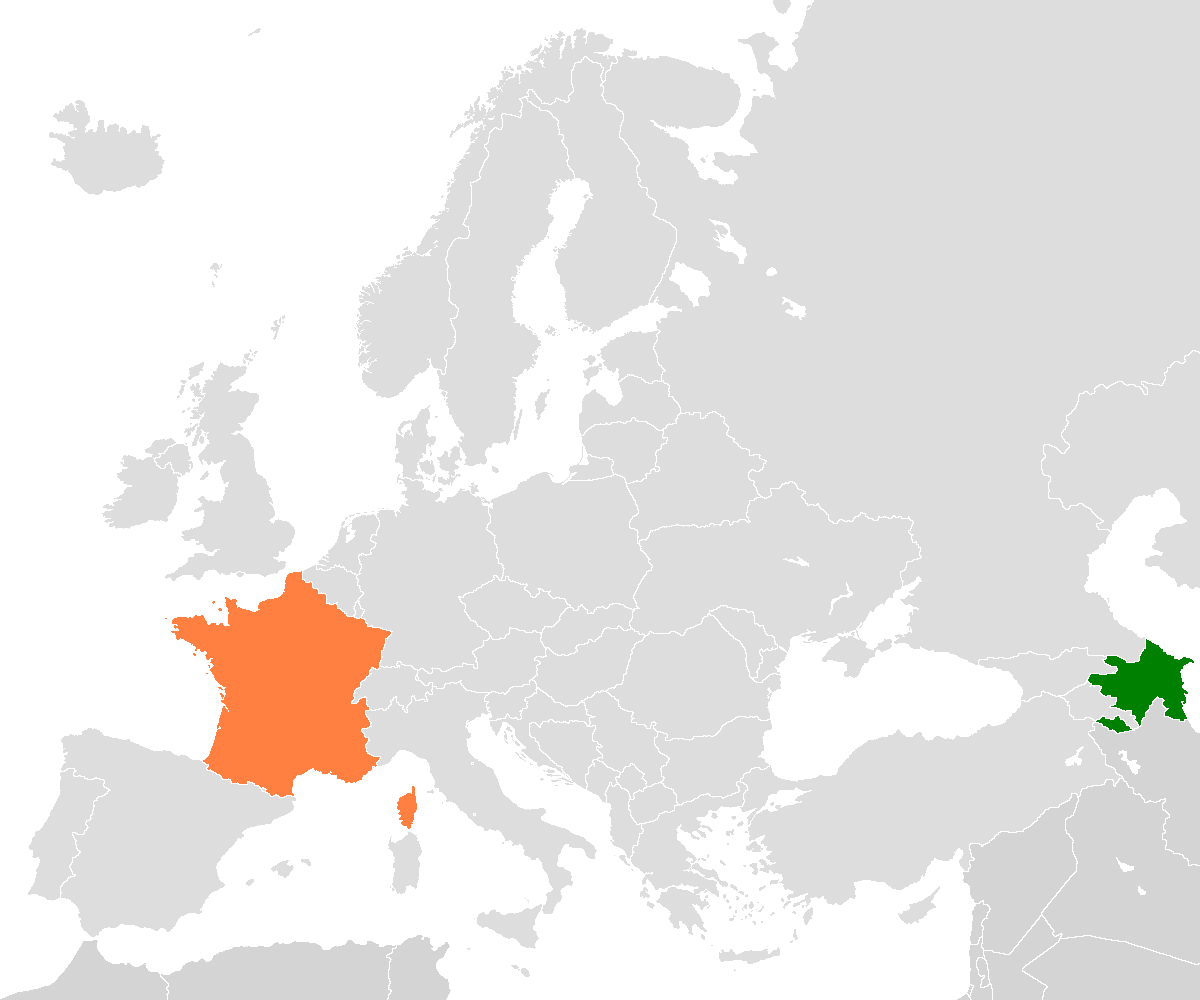

- Azerbaijan: France

Diplomatic mission
- Embassy of Azerbaijan, Paris: Embassy of France, Baku

Azerbaijan–France relations are the bilateral relations between the Republic of Azerbaijan and the French Republic in the political, socio-economic, cultural, and other spheres.

Cooperation is carried out in such areas as energy (Total), environment (Suez CNIM), transport (Alstom, Thales, Iveco, SYSTRA), agriculture (Lactalis, Danone), space industry (Airbus, Thales), gas sector, security, culture, hotel business (Accor), banking (Societe Generale), aviation, etc. The relations between Azerbaijan and France suffered following the Second Nagorno-Karabakh War.

== Diplomatic relations ==
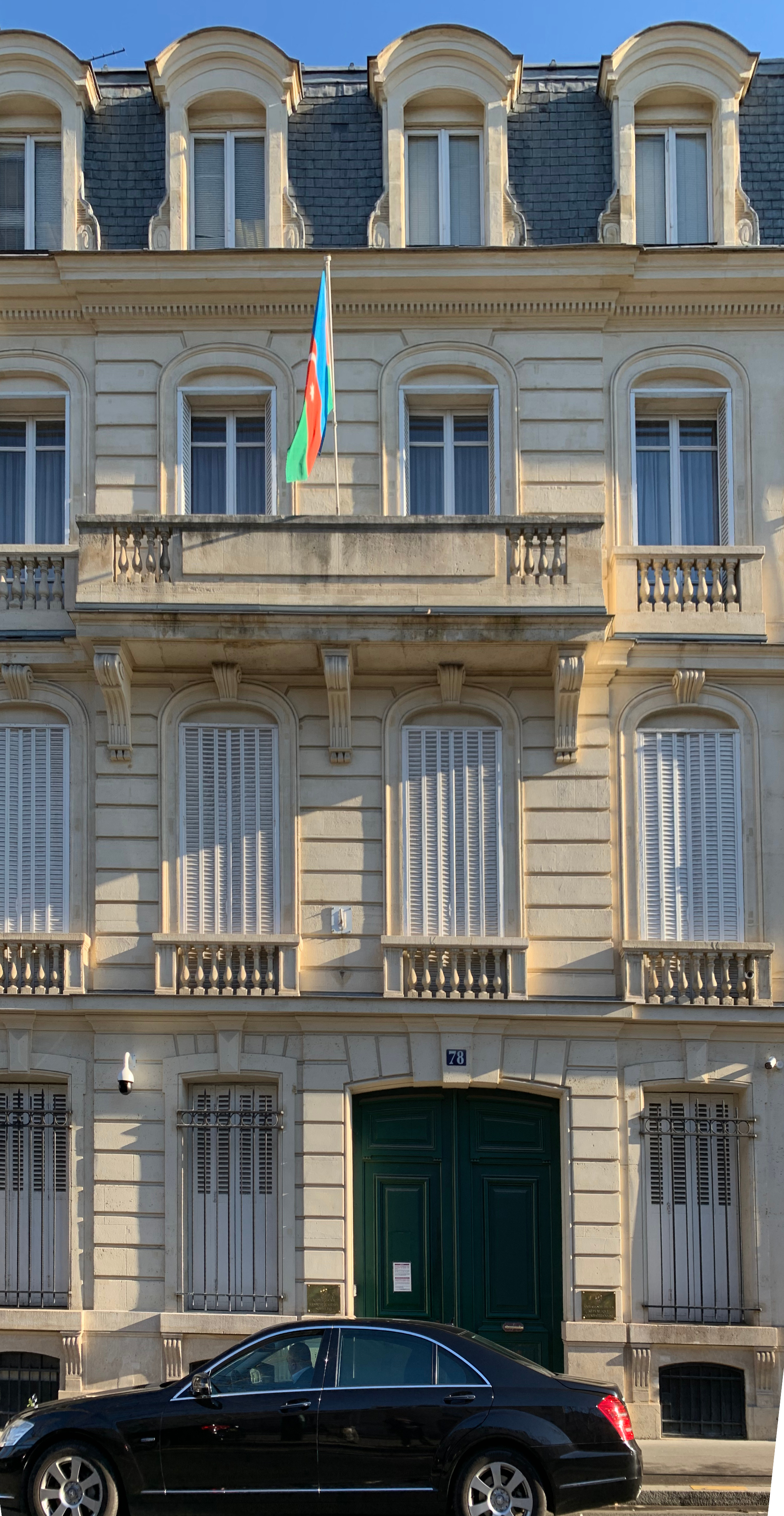
Embassy of Azerbaijan in Paris

The French government recognized Azerbaijan's independence in January 1992.

Diplomatic relations between Azerbaijan and France were established on February 21, 1992.

The French Ambassador is the second diplomat after the Turkish one who started his official activity in Azerbaijan.

The Ambassador of Azerbaijan to France is Rahman Mustafayev. Zachary Gross is the French Ambassador to Azerbaijan.

Azerbaijan has had an embassy in Paris since November 20, 1994. France has also had a representative office in Baku since February 1992.

In 2015, the French Ambassador to Azerbaijan Pascal Monnier and engaged in a meeting to Azerbaijani Defense Minister, Colonel-General Zakir Hasanov, engaged in a meeting to establish further relations, especially in military-political development.

French businessman Martin Ryan, who had been arrested in Azerbaijan in 2023 and subsequently convicted for espionage, was pardoned by Ilham Aliyev in September 2026 as part of a deal which freed oligarch Alisher Usmanov from EU-sanctions. The French government had aggressively campaigned against other EU members to remove Usmanov from the list of sanctioned individuals by threatening to block a renewal of the sanctions list with some 2,600 individuals on it.

== Inter-parliamentary relations ==
The Milli Majlis of Azerbaijan has a working group on inter-parliamentary relations between Azerbaijan and France. The head of the group is Soltan Mammadov.

The French Senate has an inter-parliamentary friendship group between France and the Caucasus (Azerbaijan, Georgia). The head of the group is Alain Uper.

The French-Azerbaijani inter-parliamentary friendship group, headed by Pierre Alain Raphan, operates in the National Assembly of France.

== Legal framework ==
Legal framework: 53 documents have been signed between Azerbaijan and France.

On March 14, 2017, the signing ceremony of bilateral agreements between Azerbaijan and France took place at the Elysee Palace:

1. Memorandum of understanding between the Ministry of ecology and natural resources of Azerbaijan and the Ministry of international relations for the environment, energy, sea, and climate of France.
2. Loan agreement between the French Development Agency and the Republic of Azerbaijan.
3. Memorandum of understanding on cooperation between the State Agency for public services and social innovation under the president of the Republic of Azerbaijan and the State Secretariat for state reforms and simplification under the prime minister of the French Republic in the field of public services.
4. Memorandum of understanding on cooperation between the Ministry of transport, communications and high technologies of the Republic of Azerbaijan and the Ministry of economy, industry and digital technologies of the French Republic in the field of innovation, information and communication technologies.
5. Protocol of intent between the State Committee for urban planning and architecture of the Republic of Azerbaijan and the Ministry of housing and sustainable development of the French Republic.

In March 2019, Azerbaijani First Vice President Mehriban Aliyeva met with French prime minister Edouard Philippe. A number of agreements were concluded:

1. Convention on the reconstruction of the Sumgayit-Yalama railway line of the North-South transport corridor within the framework of the railway sector development program.
2. Agreement on strategic cooperation between the Central Bank of Azerbaijan and Rotchild & Cie Bank.
3. Agreement on research on the establishment of an operational control Center" and "Agreement on the implementation of the alarm and telecommunications system of the Khojasan depot" between Baku Metro CJSC and Thales International.

== High-level visits ==
Since the independence of Azerbaijan, the Azerbaijani head of state has visited France 21 times, the vice-president twice, the prime minister thrice, the speaker of the Parliament twice, and the foreign ministers 28 times in the framework of state, official and working visits. The French heads of state have visited Azerbaijan three times (two official and one working visit), the speaker of the Senate once, and the foreign ministers visited Azerbaijan three times.

After being elected president on October 3, 1993, Heydar Aliyev made his first official visit to France on December 19–22, 1993, at the invitation of French president Francois Mitterrand. During his visit, the president of Azerbaijan met with his French counterpart, as well as the leadership of the Parliament, Foreign Minister Alain Juppe, representatives of industrial and other spheres of the country. The presidents signed an agreement on friendship, mutual understanding, and cooperation between the two countries. During the visit to Paris, the "Charter of Paris" was also signed, which is one of the main contracts of the Organization for Security and Co-operation in Europe. The Charter provided for the transition of the Eastern European socialist republics and former Soviet republics to democracy and a market economy.

In October 1996, Herve de Charette, the French foreign minister, paid an official visit to Azerbaijan, during which the developing Azerbaijani-French relations were noted at meetings. Three months after the visit of the French foreign minister, in January 1997, the Azerbaijani head of state made his second visit to France at the invitation of President Jacques Chirac. During this visit of the president, the State Oil Company of Azerbaijan (SOCAR) and the French companies Total and Elfakiten signed a contract that provided for the joint development of the Lankaran-Deniz and Talysh-Deniz fields. In addition to the oil contract, the parties also signed agreements in the field of air transport, free entry and exit, and culture.

In November 2002, the presidents of the two countries met at the Prague NATO Euro-Atlantic partnership summit and discussed the issue of resolving the Nagorno-Karabakh conflict. During his visit to France in May 2006 to participate in the session of the NATO Parliamentary Assembly, Ilham Aliyev also met with the French president after the talks in Rambouillet.

On January 29–31, 2007, Ilham Aliyev paid a state visit to France, during which he held a number of meetings with Jacques Chirac, Prime Minister Dominique de Vilpin, and other leaders of the French government, at which it was stated that relations between the two countries were developing at a high level. At a meeting with Ilham Aliyev on January 30, 2007, French prime minister Dominique de Vilpin spoke about the development of Azerbaijan in all spheres, its culture, and the relations between Azerbaijan and France. During the visit, agreements were signed between the two countries in the field of scientific cooperation, civil defense, aeronautics, tourism, the place of women and children in society, etc. Also, during this visit, the president of Azerbaijan was awarded the highest award of France by Jacques Chirac. On January 29, 2007, the Elysee Palace hosted the ceremony of awarding the order of Commander of the Grand Cross of the Legion of Honor to Ilham Aliyev and the Order of Heydar Aliyev to Jacques Chirac.

On November 20, 2007, Ilham Aliyev met with French president Nicolas Sarkozy. A wide range of issues of bilateral cooperation and the negotiation process for the peaceful settlement of the Armenian-Azerbaijani Nagorno-Karabakh conflict were discussed at the meeting.

In October 2009, in Baku, the center for strategic studies under the president of Azerbaijan held discussions on the topic "Azerbaijani-French relations in the context of regional geopolitics", which was attended by French Ambassador to Azerbaijan Gabriel Keller. The Ambassador noted that 30 students are currently studying in France under the state program of Azerbaijan.

On January 20, 2010, the Ministry of Foreign Affairs of France awarded former Azerbaijani ambassador to France Tarik Aliyev the French Order of national dignity, the degree of Glory of a senior officer.

On February 11, 2011, Ilham Aliyev met with the French Secretary of transport Pieri Mariani. Pieri Mariani noted that the bilateral relations between the two countries have expanded in recent years.

On May 11, 2014, Ilham Aliyev, Mehriban Aliyeva and French president Francois Hollande, who was on an official visit to the country, got acquainted with the construction of the Baku French Lyceum.

On April 25, 2015, a tête-à-tête meeting was held between Ilham Aliyev and Francois Hollande, who was in Baku on a working visit. During the conversation, a broad exchange of views on the settlement of the Nagorno-Karabakh conflict was held. Regional, international and other issues of mutual interest were also discussed during the meeting.

On September 3, 2015, the official opening of the "Azerbaijan town" organized by the Heydar Aliyev Foundation took place on the Parisian square of the Palais Royal in front of the Louvre. Mehriban Aliyeva met with Francois Hollande at the Elysee Palace on September 3.

In April 2016, Mehriban Aliyeva met with a French delegation headed by the president of the Society of Friends of Azerbaijan in France, Jean Francois Mansel.

In February 2017, the secretary of state for state reforms and research under the French prime minister, Jean-Vincent Platz, paid a working visit to Baku. Prospects for cooperation with the ASAN service in the field of e-government were discussed.

In July 2018, Ilham Aliyev met with French president Emmanuel Macron. A number of documents were signed.

In July 2019, Ilham Aliyev met with French economy and Finance Minister Bruno Le Maire in Baku. The sides discussed prospects of cooperation in such areas as ecology, infrastructure, transport, oil and gas region, etc.

On September 30, 2019, the French delegation headed by the chairman of the France-Caucasus friendship group and the vice-chairman for Azerbaijan-Alain Juper to Azerbaijan.

In January 2020, an official visit of the assistant of the president of Azerbaijan, the head of the Foreign Policy Department of the Presidential Administration, Hikmet Hajiyev, paid a visit to France. Among the topics discussed were the Nagorno-Karabakh conflict, Franco-Azerbaijani relations, regional affairs, the Middle East, the EU-Azerbaijan, energy, and broader reform initiatives of the Azerbaijani President.

In September 2020, Hikmet Hajiyev paid a working visit to France. There were a number of meetings with the diplomatic advisor to the Cabinet of the French president Emmanuel Bonne, advisor to the Ministry of the Defense Xavier Chatel and Director of Continental Europe Department of the Ministry of Europe and Foreign Affairs of France Frédéric Mondoloni.

== Economic cooperation ==
On May 12, 2014, a joint Azerbaijani-French business forum was held in Baku with the participation of over 200 representatives of various companies and government officials.

65 French companies operate in Azerbaijan in such areas as economy, industry, energy, trade, agriculture, etc.

Azerbaijan has invested 2.1 million US dollars in the French economy. France, in turn, invested approximately 2.2 million US dollars in the economy of Azerbaijan.

On November 26, 2015, at the initiative of the Ministry of economy and industry, an Azerbaijani-French business meeting was organized within the framework of the visit of the delegation headed by the State Secretary for regional reforms under the Minister of Decentralization and Public service Andre Vallini to Azerbaijan. At the meeting held in the Baku Business Center, the work done on the establishment of the Azerbaijani-French Regional Cooperation Council was discussed.

- According to the State Statistical Committee of Azerbaijan, in 2017 the volume of trade turnover between the two countries amounted to 739 million euros.
- According to statistics from the French Customs, in 2018, the volume of trade turnover amounted to 614 million euros. The volume of French exports from Azerbaijan was 114 million euros, and the volume of Azerbaijani exports from France was 500 million euros.
- According to statistics from the United Nations trade office (COMTRADE), in 2019, the volume of exports from France to Azerbaijan was 536.65 million US dollars.
- According to statistics from the UN trade office (COMTRADE), in 2019, the volume of imports of equipment, nuclear reactors, boilers to Azerbaijan amounted to 22.74 million US dollars.

In the first five months of 2019, the volume of trade between the countries increased by 53%.

In May 2020, a joint webinar was held on the initiative of the Azerbaijan export and investment promotion Foundation (AZPROMO), the French entrepreneurs' organization (MEDEF) and the Azerbaijan-France Chamber of Commerce and Industry (AZPROMO).

The State Oil Company of Azerbaijan (SOCAR) and the French oil company "Total" are cooperating. It is planned to implement projects such as the exploration and development of the Umid and Babek offshore fields.

Trade turnover (in millions of US dollars)
Years	Import	Export	Trade turnover	Balance
2014	157.36	1,523.48	1,680.84	1,366.12
2015	212.25	864.10	1,076.35	651.85
2016	150.41	493.64	644.05	343.23
2017	155	337	492	282
2018	183	441.7	624.7	258
2019 January–March	57.5	81.3	137.8	

France's main exports are electrical equipment, ferrous metals, and products made from them, chemical products, medicines, gas meters, plastics, furniture, dairy products, live plants, buses, etc.

The basis of Azerbaijan's export: crude oil, methanol, walnuts, plastic bags and bags, fruit juice, etc.

The Azerbaijan-French Economic Commission was established in 1997.

== Military-technical cooperation ==
In the summer of 2019, at the initiative of the Association of the French aerospace industry, the Paris Air Show-2019 was held in Paris. Within the framework of the exhibition, an adviser to the minister of defense industry of Azerbaijan Farrukh Vezirov met with the heads of French companies such as Nexter, Thales, CS Communication, Lacroix and others. Various projects were discussed: joint production of wheeled armored vehicles, etc.

Purchases of air defense systems, Dassault Rafale fighter-bombers, space vehicles, etc. are being made.

== International cooperation ==
In the international arena, cooperation is carried out within the framework of various international organizations: The Council of Europe, the OSCE, etc.

France is one of the co-chair States (along with the US and Russia) of the OSCE Minsk Group, which is a mediator in the settlement of the Nagorno-Karabakh conflict.

In October 2014, at the initiative of the French government, talks were held in Paris between Ilham Aliyev and Armenian president Serzh Sargsyan on the issue of the Nagorno-Karabakh conflict.

== Cultural ties ==
In 2007, the Heydar Aliyev Foundation allocated a certain amount to restore the interior of the Palace of Versailles. In 2009, the foundation donated 40,000 euros (53,776 US dollars) for the restoration of three stained-glass windows of the Cathedral of Notre-Dame in Strasbourg.

Then a million euros (over 1.34 million US dollars) was donated to the Louvre, as well as a mobile art exhibition.

In 2008, the European-Azerbaijani Society was established. The head of the company is Taleh Heydarov. The Paris branch of the society is headed by Eliza Pieter.

On July 4, 2013, at the initiative of the Heydar Aliyev Foundation, the project "Days of Azerbaijani culture" was launched in Cannes (France), which lasted until July 7. On July 6, an evening of classical music was held as part of the project of the Heydar Aliyev Foundation to preserve and promote Azerbaijani culture in the world. On July 7, a demonstration of Azerbaijani cinema – the film "Arshin Mal Alan" was held.

On July 10, 2014, the Days of culture of Azerbaijan started in Cannes with the support of the Heydar Aliyev Foundation.

The event included concerts and exhibitions, the main of which is called "Azerbaijan — the country of traditions and the future". The exhibition "Azerbaijan-the country of traditions and the future" was held in the building of the Cannes Sea station until July 31.

From July 14 to 31, 2015, the Days of culture of Azerbaijan were held in Cannes with the support of the Heydar Aliyev Foundation.

The exhibition "Azerbaijani carpets in art" opened at the Palais des Festivals in Cannes on July 15. The exhibition featured works by Azerbaijani artists Latif Kerimov, Vugar Muradov, Butunay Hagverdiev and Elchin Veliyev.

On July 13, 2017, the Days of Azerbaijani culture started in Cannes with the support of the Heydar Aliyev Foundation. As part of the days of culture, the opening ceremony of the exhibition "Togrul Narimanbekov: melody of colors" was held in the city's Gare Maritime exhibition pavilion. Vice-President of the Heydar Aliyev Foundation Leyla Aliyeva attended the opening of the exhibition.

In February 2020, education Minister Jeyhun Bayramov met with the head of the Azerbaijan-France Chamber of Commerce and Industry (CCIAF) on "Education Reform: the role of the private sector". The meeting was also attended by representatives of embassies, state agencies, etc.

Recent educational reforms, an increase in the number of vocational schools, and prospects for cooperation between the private sector and educational institutions were mentioned.

An agreement on friendship and cooperation was signed between 12 cities of Azerbaijan and 10 cities and 1 province of France.

In Azerbaijan, 300 schools teach French.

== Other areas ==
On June 8, 2011, the government of France and the government of Azerbaijan reached an agreement on cooperation in the field of "telecommunications and digital economy".

In October 2019, the Minister of Transport, Communications and High technologies of Azerbaijan Ramin Guluzadeh met with the French Ambassador to Azerbaijan Zachary Gross. Prospects for joint activities in the field of information and communication technologies (ICT) were discussed.

== French-Azerbaijani University (UFAZ) ==
The French-Azerbaijani University (UFAZ), established in 2014 on the initiative of the presidents of Azerbaijan and France, has been in operation since September 2016. students are admitted in 4 technical specialties:

- Bachelor of chemical engineering
- Bachelor of computer science
- Bachelor of geophysical engineering
- Bachelor of oil and gas engineering

On the French side, the project includes a consortium of French universities, led by the University of Strasbourg (Unistra). On the Azerbaijani side, the project is managed by the Azerbaijan State University of Oil and Industry (ASUNP) in close cooperation with the Ministry of Education of Azerbaijan. Education at the university is conducted in accordance with the French education system by an international academic staff consisting of French and Azerbaijani teachers.

== Diplomacy ==
Republic of Azerbaijan

- Paris (Embassy)

Republic of France

- Baku (Embassy)

== See also ==
- Foreign relations of Azerbaijan
- Foreign relations of France
- Azerbaijan-NATO relations
- Azerbaijan-EU relations
- Azerbaijanis in France
- Alexandre Dumas
- Alexandre Michon
- Isa bek Hajinski House
- Ahmadiyya Jabrayilov
- Cinematograph
- Robert Hossein
