= Azerbaijan–Netherlands relations =

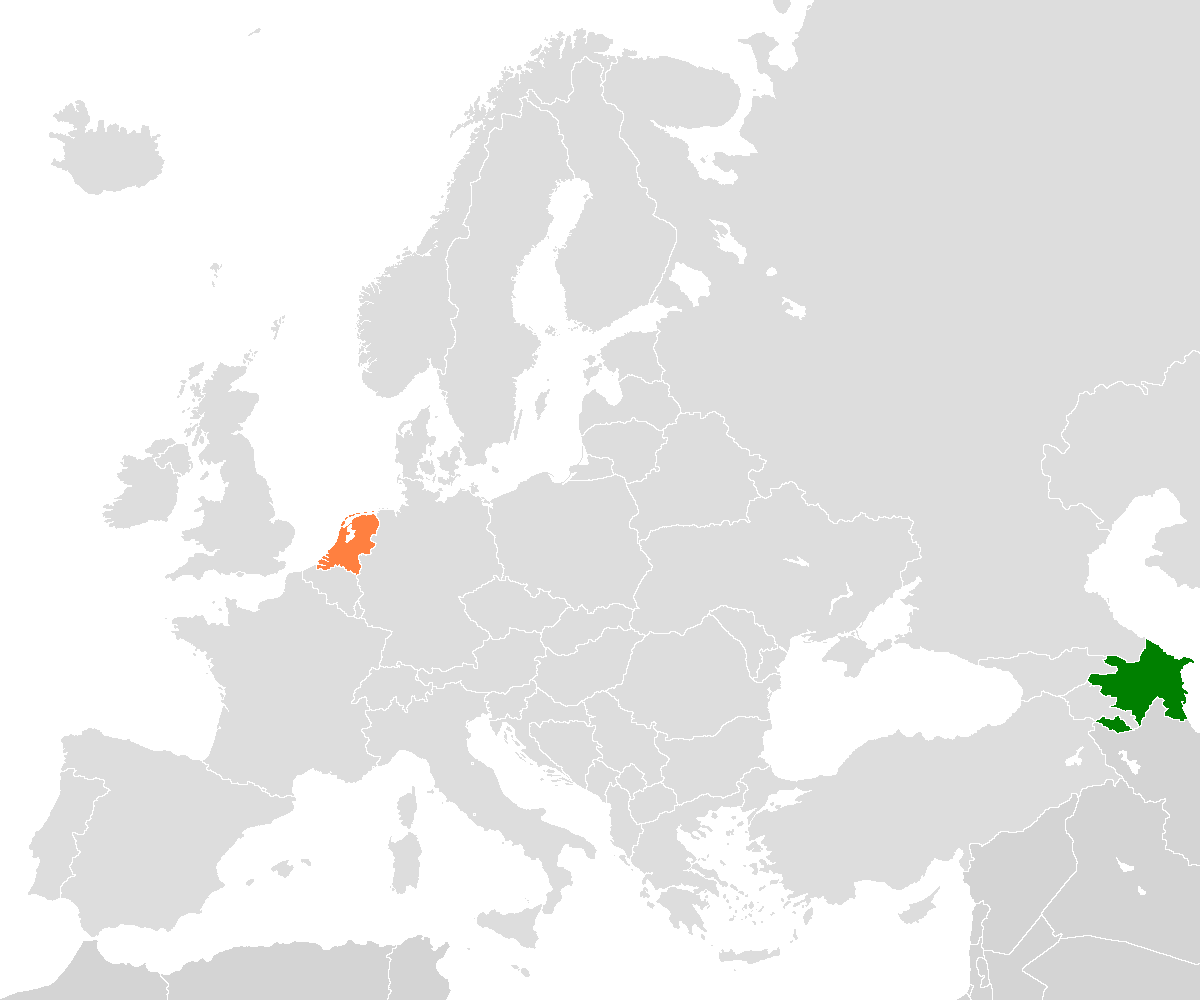

- Azerbaijan: Netherlands

Diplomatic mission
- Embassy of Azerbaijan, The Hague: Embassy of the Netherlands, Baku

Diplomatic relations exist between Azerbaijan and the Netherlands. Azerbaijan has an embassy in The Hague. The Netherlands has an embassy in Baku. Both countries are full members of the Council of Europe. Azerbaijan celebrated the 30th anniversary of its diplomatic relations with the Netherlands on April 1, 2022.

== History ==
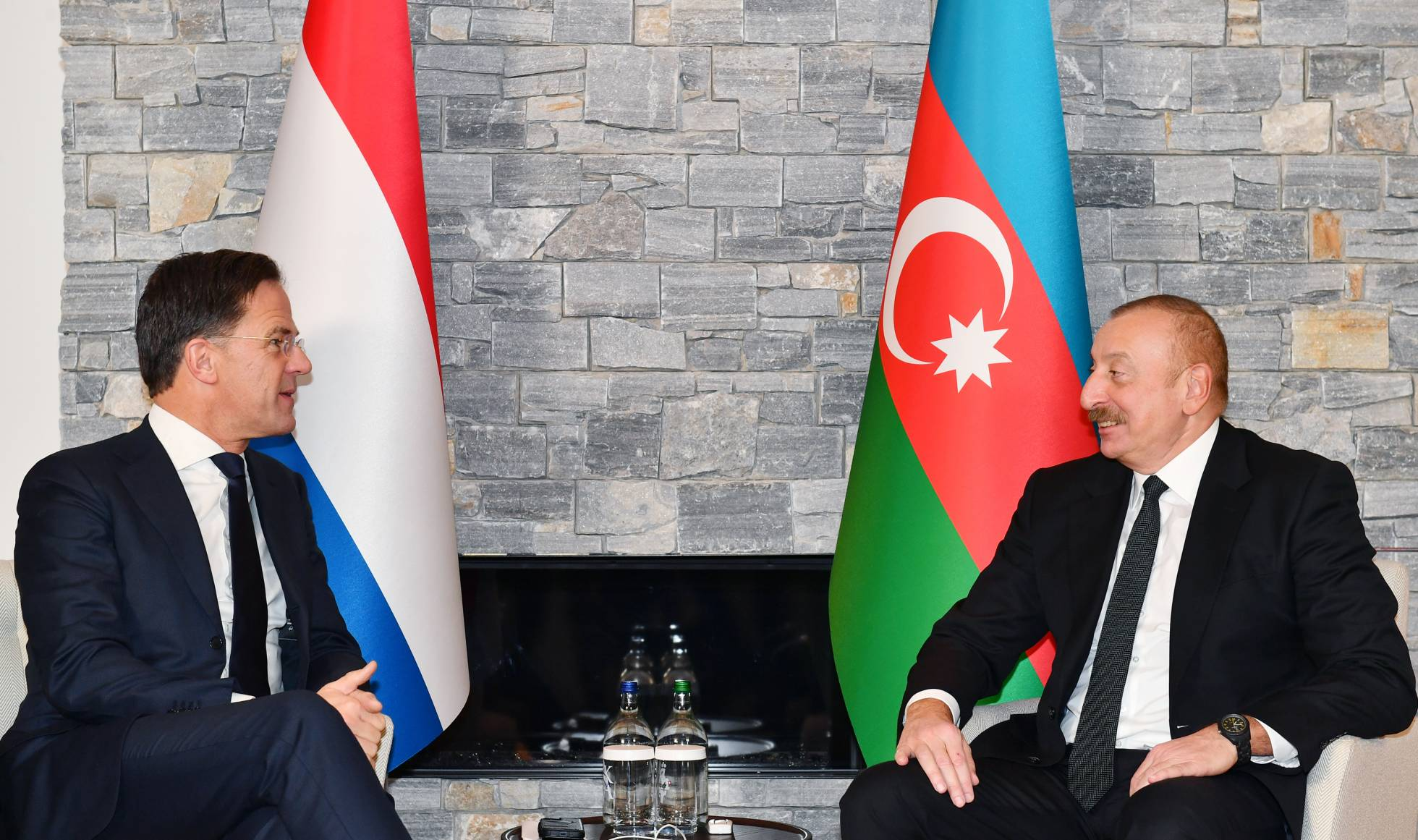
Dutch Prime Minister Mark Rutte meet with Azerbaijani President Ilham Aliyev in Davos, 19 January 2023

The Kingdom of the Netherlands recognized the independence of the Republic of Azerbaijan on 31 December 1991. Since 1 April 1992, bilateral relations between two countries have been started. President of Azerbaijan Ilham Aliyev signed an order on opening an embassy of the Kingdom of Netherlands on 20 September 2005.

On 24 April 2007, Ambassador Fuad Iskenderov presented his credentials to the Queen of the Kingdom of the Netherlands, Beatrix Wilhelmina Armgard.

On 26 June 2009 the Government of Netherlands decided to open an embassy in Azerbaijan and in August of the same year ambassador of Netherlands to Czech Republic Lucas van Horn was appointed to the post. On 23 October 2009 Y.L.van Horn presented his credentials to the president of Azerbaijan and began its activity.

On 16 August 2010 new ambassador of the Kingdom of Netherlands presented his credentials to the president of Azerbaijan.

Presently Onno Kervers is the Ambassador of the Netherlands in Azerbaijan. On 8 August 2025, the Netherlands welcomed the peace agreement signed between Azerbaijan and Armenia and announced its full support for the normalization process of relations between Azerbaijan and Armenia.

== Diplomatic relations ==
=== State visits ===
Date	Visits
7 May 2009	President of Azerbaijan Ilham Aliyev met Prime Minister of the Netherlands Jan Peter Balkenende in the framework of Prague Eastern Partnership Summit
1 December 2010	President of Azerbaijan Ilham Aliyev met Prime Minister of the Netherlands Mark Rutte at OSCE Summit in Astana
23 January 2014	President of Azerbaijan Ilham Aliyev met Prime Minister of the Netherlands Mark Rutte at Davos Economic Forum
23–25 March 2014	President of Azerbaijan Ilham Aliyev's visit to the Netherlands to participate in the Third Nuclear Security Summit held in the Hague
4–6 February 2002	Minister of Justice of Azerbaijan Fazil Mammadov visited the Netherlands
12–19 May 2002	Minister of Education of Azerbaijan Misir Mardanov visited the Netherlands
4–10 December 2007	Minister of Health of Azerbaijan Ogtay Shiraliyev to the Netherlands
6–8 December 2007	Visit of the Minister of Education of Azerbaijan Misir Mardanov to the Netherlands
29 June - 2 July 2009	Visit of the Chief of State Border Service of Azerbaijan Elchin Guliyev to the Netherlands
25–28 October 2009	Visit of the Chairman of State Migration Service of Azerbaijan Arzu Rahimov to the Netherlands
8–12 August 2010	Visit of Minister of Justice of the Netherlands Ernst Hirsch Ballin to Azerbaijan
17–19 May 2011	Minister of Emergency Situations of Azerbaijan Kamaladdin Heydarov visited to the Netherlands
6–7 March 2012	Visit of the Minister of Infrastructure and Environment of the Netherlands Melanie Henriëtte Schultz van Haegen-Maas Geesteranus to Azerbaijan
10–12 June 2012	Minister of Foreign Affairs of Azerbaijan Elmar Mammadyarov visited to the Netherlands
12–14 September 2012	Visit of Deputy Prime Minister, Minister of Economic Affairs, Agriculture and Innovation Maxime Jacques Marcel Verhagen to Azerbaijan
4 February 2014	Minister of Foreign Affairs of the Netherlands Frans Timmermans visited Azerbaijan
2–5 April 2014	Executive Director of State Oil Fond of Azerbaijan Shamhar Movsumov visited the Netherlands
22–25 April 2014	Chairman of State Migration Service of Azerbaijan Firuddin Nabiyev visited the Netherlands
12–14 May 2014	General Director of Repatriation and Departure Service of the Netherlands Rodia Maas visited Azerbaijan
4 September 2014	Minister of Foreign Affairs of Azerbaijan Elmar Mammadyarov met his Dutch colleague Frans Timmermans within the framework of the NATO Wales Summit
10–11 October 2014	General Director of Migration and Naturalization Service Rob van Lint visited Azerbaijan
6–7 November 2014	Minister of Infrastructure and Environment of the Netherlands Melanie Henriëtte Schultz van Haegen-Maas Geesteranus visited Azerbaijan
15–17 April 2015	Minister of Communication and High Technologies of Azerbaijan Ali Abbasov visited the Netherlands within the framework of the Global Conference of CyberSpace 2015 held in the Hague
21–23 April 2015	Minister of Emergency Situations of Azerbaijan Kamaladdin Heydarov visited the Netherlands
22–23 April 2015	Meeting of Minister of Foreign Affairs Elmar Mammadyarov with his Dutch colleague Bert Koenders in the framework of UN General Assembly

=== Contracts ===
So far 10 agreements have been signed between Azerbaijan and the Kingdom of Netherlands:

1. Azerbaijan and Netherlands signed an agreement on air transportation on 11 July 1996.
2. A memorandum of Understanding on cooperation program was signed on 24 April 1998.
3. An Agreement on mutual administrative assistance on the proper application of customs legislation and prevention, investigation, and combating of customs offenses was signed on January 30, 2002.
4. An Agreement of Understanding on cooperation program was signed on February 22, 2002
5. An Agreement of Understanding on cooperation was signed between the Ministry of Justice of the Kingdom of Netherland and the Ministry of Justice of Azerbaijan.
6. An Agreement on international auto shipping was signed on 25 May 2004.
7. An Agreement on the avoidance of double taxation and the prevention of fiscal evasion with respect to taxes on income and on capital.
8. Memorandum of Understanding between the State Border Service of the Republic of Azerbaijan and the Repatriation and Departure Service of the Kingdom of the Netherlands on the fight against illegal migration (1 July 2009)
9. The Memorandum of Understanding between the Ministry of Internal Affairs of the Republic of Azerbaijan and the Ministry of Justice of the Kingdom of the Netherlands in the field of non-operating cooperation (10 August 2010)
10. The Memorandum of Understanding between the Ministry of Emergency Situations of the Republic of Azerbaijan and the Ministry of Infrastructure and Environment of the Kingdom of the Netherlands in the field of water management cooperation (6 November 2014)

== Economic relations ==
The economic relations between Azerbaijan and the Netherlands cover different fields. Azerbaijan and Netherlands cooperate in different directions in order to enhance the economic relations in the fields such as industry, producing, processing, and packing of agricultural production, ICT, tourism, health, ecology, as well as the Netherlands companies in industrial parks in Azerbaijan.

Azerbaijan is one of the main trading partners of Europe in the South Caucasus. It has a specific role in energy security in Europe. In recent years, new steps are taken on developing cooperation between Azerbaijan and Netherlands. More than 100 companies with Netherlands capital are operating in Azerbaijan. Their activity area hosts activities in the fields of financing, industry, construction, service, trade, agriculture, transport and ecology, etc. in Azerbaijan.

So far Netherlands made nearly $670 million direct investments in different fields of Azerbaijan's economy. In recent years trade turnover between Azerbaijan and Netherlands has reached about 200 million dollars per year. Azerbaijan exports mainly oil and gas products to the Netherlands. Dutch companies are interested in participating in the projects covering different areas in Azerbaijan as a contractor. Azerbaijan cooperates with Dutch companies in the field of rehabilitation of the Absheron lakes, including Boyukshor Lake.

== Other fields of bilateral cooperation ==
Azerbaijan and Netherlands signed an agreement on Joint MBA (Master of Business Administration) program covering the field of energy management in 2013. The program between Azerbaijan Diplomatic Academy and Maastricht School of Management successfully continues. The program provides graduates with the diplomas of both ADA and MSM.

Every year Clingendael Institute of Netherlands holds training for Eastern Partnership countries’ diplomats. Within the cooperation between Azerbaijan Diplomatic Academy and Clingendael Institute diplomats of the Academy participate in the training every year.

Annual seminars on the Armenia-Azerbaijan Nagorno-Karabakh conflict are organized within the framework of the cooperation with the Hague Academy of International Law. Specialists in international law and legal affairs are involved in the seminars.

== Resident diplomatic missions ==
- Azerbaijan has an embassy in The Hague.
- the Netherlands has an embassy in Baku.
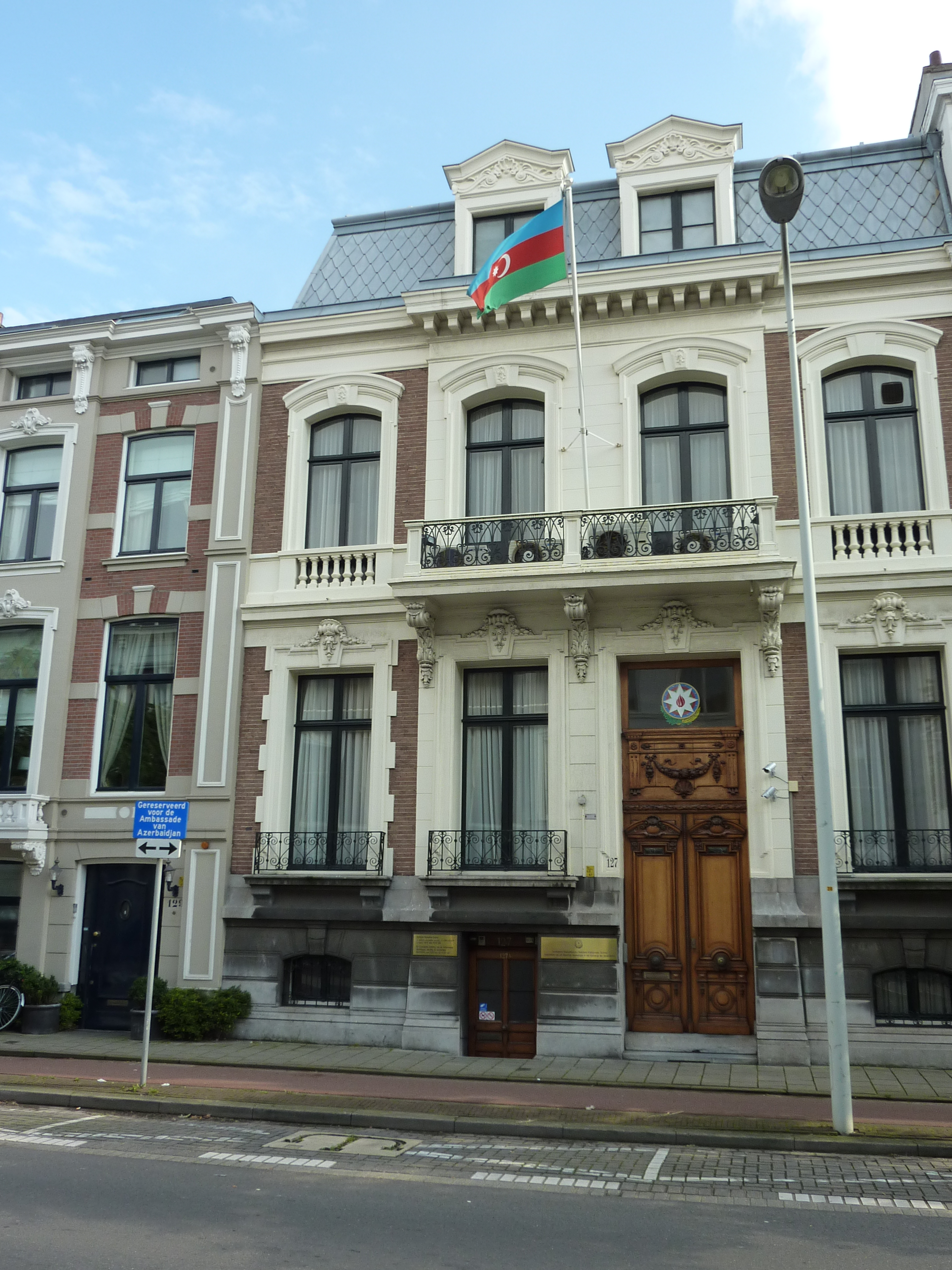
Embassy of Azerbaijan in The Hague

== See also ==
- Foreign relations of Azerbaijan
- Foreign relations of the Netherlands
- Azerbaijan–EU relations
- Azerbaijanis in the Netherlands
- Azerbaijanis in Europe
- Dutchs in Azerbaijan
