= Adile Aliyeva =

Azerbaijani pianist

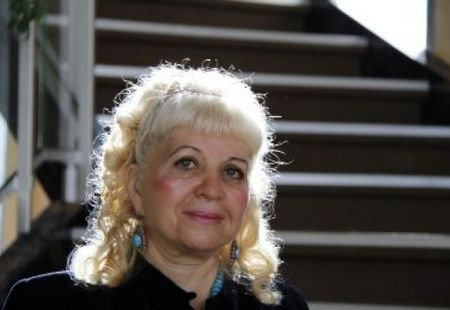
- Born: Baku, Azerbaijan SSR, Soviet Union
- Citizenship: Soviet Union; Republic of Azerbaijan; France
- Occupations: Pianist; Scholar

Adile Aliyeva is an Azerbaijani pianist, scholar, director of International Academy of Music and recipient of the Knight of the Legion of Honour.

== Life ==
Aliyeva was born in the city of Baku. After completing the music school named after Bulbul, she entered the Moscow State Conservatory, where she completed her studies with distinction and began her postgraduate education. She was a member of the Supreme Soviet of the Azerbaijan Soviet Socialist Republic from 1980 to 1986.

== Activity ==
She has performed concerts in over 50 countries. Aliyeva is the leader of the "Stars of Russia" ensemble, which brings together professors and soloists from the Moscow Conservatory. Aliyeva worked as a professor of piano in Geneva and Annecy. In her creative career, she was a laureate of the Rakhmaninov Concerto Competition in Moscow, the International VILLA-LOBOS Competition, and the Transcaucasian Competition, being recognized as one of the finest performers of Rachmaninoff's concertos. Since 2001, she has been active as the director of the International Academy of Music in France, where she also teaches piano. Starting in 1996, an international competition named after her is held every two years in France. This competition is titled: "International Piano Competition in the Name of Adila Aliyeva".
