= Azerbaijan–Czech Republic relations =

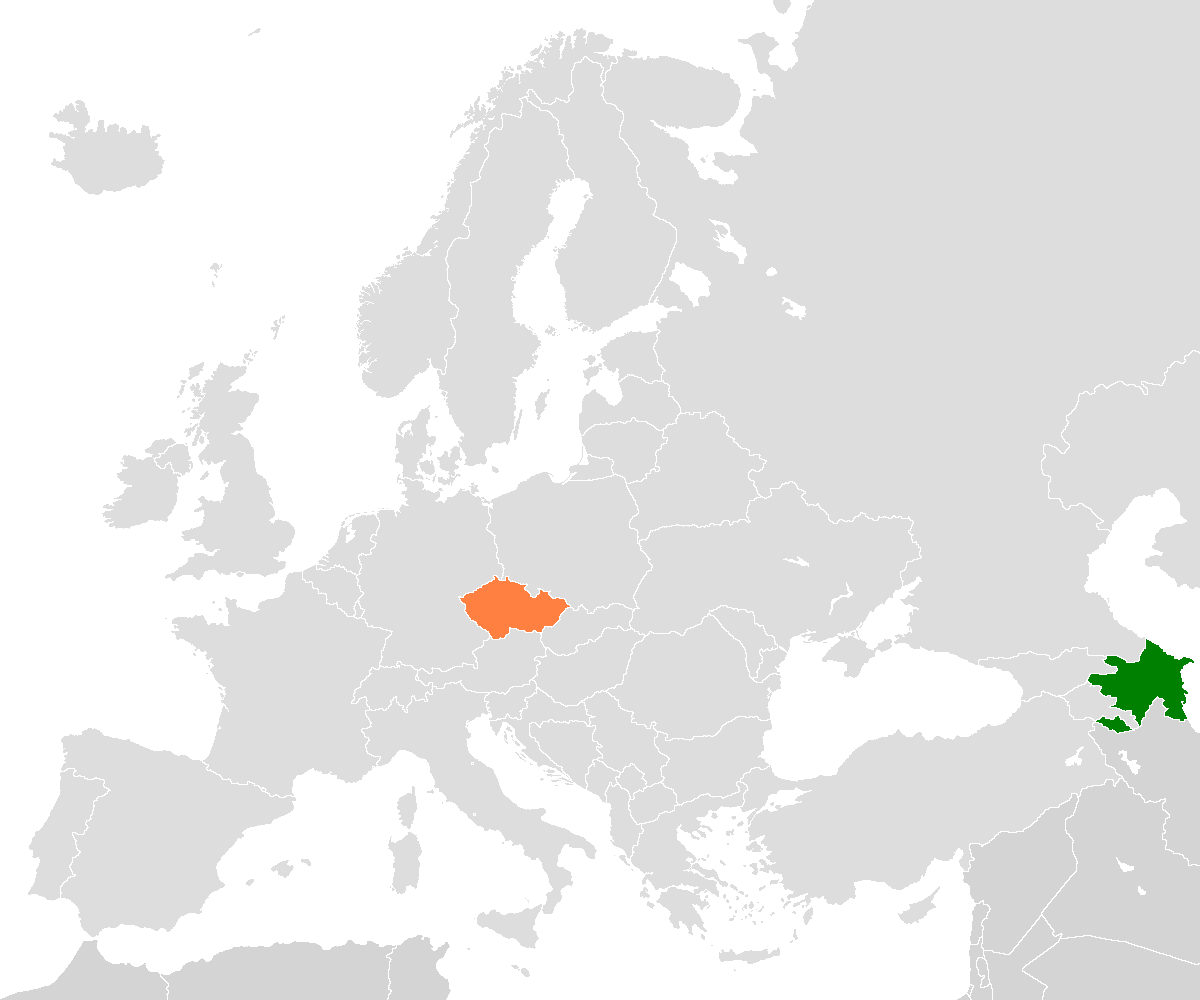

- Azerbaijan: Czech Republic

Azerbaijan and Czech Republic established diplomatic relations on 29 January 1993, shortly after the Czech Republic recognized Azerbaijan's independence on 8 January 1992.

== History ==
A bilateral working group on relations with Azerbaijan operates within the Chamber of Deputies of the Parliament of the Czech Republic. The group is headed by Jan Kubíce.

In July 2010, direct passenger air services were launched between Prague and Baku.

The Intergovernmental Commission on Economic, Scientific, Technical and Cultural Cooperation has been operating since 2011. On 8 July 2026, Azerbaijan’s Minister of Economy, Mikayil Jabbarov, was appointed co-chair of this Commission.

In June 2025, deputy foreign ministers held political consultations in Prague, discussing bilateral cooperation, trade, energy, transport, and high technologies.

In May 2026 Foreign Ministers Jeyhun Bayramov and Petr Macinka met in New York, reaffirming their commitment to strengthening cooperation in political, economic, energy, and humanitarian fields and reviewing the implementation of agreements reached during the Czech Prime Minister's visit to Azerbaijan.

=== High-level visits ===
- November 2002 – President Heydar Aliyev visited Prague to attend the NATO Summit.
- May 2009 – President Ilham Aliyev participated in the Eastern Partnership Summit and the Southern Corridor energy summit in Prague.
- April 2012 – President Ilham Aliyev paid a state visit to the Czech Republic.
- May 2011 – Czech President Václav Klaus made an official visit to Azerbaijan.
- September 2015 – Czech President Miloš Zeman visited Azerbaijan. During the visit, the two countries signed the Joint Declaration on Strategic Partnership, elevating bilateral relations to a strategic level.
- October 2022 — Working visit of the President of Azerbaijan, Ilham Aliyev, to Prague to participate in the European Political Community Summit.

== Economic relations ==
Azerbaijan has long been an important supplier of crude oil to the Czech Republic. Azerbaijani oil has been processed at Czech refineries, contributing to the diversification of the country's energy supplies. In 2014, bilateral trade between Azerbaijan and the Czech Republic amounted to €1.5 billion. In 2018, bilateral trade totalled €1.1 billion, with Azerbaijani exports accounting for €1 billion. Crude oil constituted the principal export commodity. According to statistics from the United Nations Statistics Division, Czech exports of taximeters, distance-recording instruments, and pedometers to Azerbaijan amounted to US$1.29 thousand in 2019.

In April 2015, Azerbaijan Railways CJSC and Moravia Steel signed an agreement on the overhaul of the Baku—Boyuk Kesik railway.

In September 2015, an Azerbaijan–Czech Republic business forum was held in Baku. The forum was attended by the heads of state, Ilham Aliyev and Miloš Zeman. Another Azerbaijan–Czech Republic business forum was held in Baku in September 2018. On April 27, 2026, an Azerbaijani-Czech business forum was held in Gabala with the participation of Azerbaijani President Ilham Aliyev and Czech Prime Minister Andrei Babis.

== Resident diplomatic missions ==
- 2007 – Azerbaijan opened its embassy in Prague.
- 2009 – the Czech Republic opened its embassy in Baku.

== See also ==
- Foreign relations of Azerbaijan
- Foreign relations of Czech Republic
