= Azerbaijan Tourism Association =

Tourism organizations in Azerbaijan

Azerbaijan Tourism Association (Azerbaijani: Azərbaycan Turizm Assosiasiyası), or AzTA, is one of the tourism organizations in Azerbaijan. The main goal of AzTA is to amalgamate and manage nearly all tourism companies in the country.

== Activity ==
AzTA was founded in 2009 with the help of the Ministry of Culture and Tourism of Azerbaijan. Association incorporates 242 travel agencies and 110 hotels.

In 2017, AZAL and AzTA signed the agreement on cooperation. According to the agreement, AZAL became a board member of Azerbaijan Tourism Association.

The Chairman of AzTA is Ahmed Gurbanov.

The Azerbaijan Tourism Association has a committee on inbound tourism, a committee on outbound tourism and a committee on transport issues. Heads of committees are appointed for one year.

At the initiative of the AzTA, the concept "Prospects for the development of domestic tourism in Azerbaijan until 2025" was prepared.

== International cooperation ==
AzTA is one of the members of the World Tourism Organization since 2011.

In 2011, the Ministry of Culture and Tourism of Azerbaijan and AzTA signed an agreement on cooperation with the Dubai-based company Atlantis Holidays.

During the 57th Meeting of UNWTO's Regional Commission for Europe in April, 2014 which was held in Baku, the headship of AzTA signed the Private Sector Commitment to the Global Code of Ethics for Tourism.

In 2018, a Memorandum of cooperation was signed between Azerbaijan Tourism Association and the Travel Agents Association of India (TAAI)

In the same year, a partnership memorandum for two years between AZTA and Malaysian Association of Tour and Travel Agents (MATTA) was signed.

In 2019, a Memorandum of cooperation between AzTA and State Committee of Uzbekistan for Tourism Development was signed.

In 2019, AzTA signed agreements on cooperation with Les Roches International School of Hotel Management and Glion Institute of Higher Education.

Besides five new offices opened in 2020, it's planned to open offices in 25 countries around the world.

On the initiative of AzTA and with the support of tourism enterprises of Turkey, it was decided to set up the Tourism Organization of Turkic-Speaking States in 2020. The main purpose of the organization is to contribute to the development of the tourism sector in Turkic-speaking countries.

In 2020 AZTA was joined by approximately 27 tourism agencies.

There are multiple meetings with private sector leaders and tourism agencies held every year.

== See also ==
- Tourism in Azerbaijan
