= Caspian Drilling Company =

Azerbaijan-based drilling company

- Company type: Private
- Industry: Oilfield services
- Founded: 1996
- Founder: SOCAR (55%), Santa Fe Inc. (45%)
- Headquarters: Baku, Azerbaijan
- Services: Drilling
- Website: www.caspiandrilling.com

Caspian Drilling Company is an international drilling company based in Baku, Azerbaijan. It was founded in 1996 by State Oil Company of Azerbaijan Republic (SOCAR) and Santa Fe Inc. of US to conduct drilling services for many PSA agreements in Azerbaijan. SOCAR controlled 55% while Santa Fe held the remaining 45% of the stake.

Santa Fe sold all of its shares to Caspian Drilling Company in June 2009. Caspian Drilling Company is a member of the IWCF.

Over the 15-year period, the company drilled at 30 deep water locations on 14 geological structures such as Karabakh, Ashrafi, Dan Ulduzu, Azeri, Chirag, Gunashli, Shah Daniz, Nakhchivan, Absheron, Inam, Kurdashi and Araz Daniz fields and 35 directional, inclined and horizontal wells were drilled from subsea templates.

== See also ==
- Dan Ulduzu field
- Ashrafi field
- Azeri-Chirag-Guneshli
- SOCAR
