= Gunashli oilfield =

Offshore oil field in the Caspian Sea

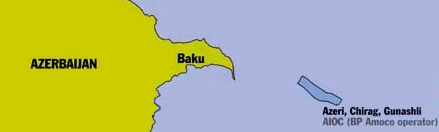
- Location of Azeri–Chirag–Guneshli in the Caspian Sea
- Country: Azerbaijan
- Region: Caspian Sea
- Offshore/onshore: Offshore
- Operator: SOCAR (western section); BP (on behalf of AIOC, eastern deepwater section)
- Partners: AIOC, eastern deepwater section

Field history
- Discovery: 1958
- Start of development: 1976
- Start of production: 1982

Production
- Estimated oil in place: 100 million tonnes (~ 100×10^{6} m^{3} or 700 million bbl)

Gunashli (Azerbaijani: Günəşli) is an offshore oil field in the Caspian Sea, located 120 kilometres (75 mi) east of Baku, Azerbaijan, 12 kilometres (7.5 mi) southeast of Oil Rocks and its deep water section is a part of the larger Azeri–Chirag–Gunashli (ACG) project. The Azerbaijani translation of Gunashli means "sunny". Gunashli is believed to have more than 100 million tonnes of oil reserves.

== Western shallow water section ==
The portion of Gunashli field which is not in the scope of the ACG project lies in 120 metres (390 ft) depth of water and developed by State Oil Company of Azerbaijan Republic (SOCAR) while the deep-water section developed by BP within the ACG project is at 175 to 300 metres (574 to 984 ft).

The field was explored in 1958–63. The first offshore platform was installed by 1976. Production in this section started in 1982. It consisted of 4 steel jackets for drilling of 10 wells. As per 1980 data, the platform produced 320 tonnes of oil per day.

As of 1995, Gunashli was producing 120,000 barrels per day (19,000 m^{3}/d) of oil. Because of the steadily falling rate of production (9%), SOCAR hired Kværner to provide project management to rehabilitate Gunashli. In March 2008, a high-flow-rate well No. 244 was put into operation through the platform No. 13. It produces 140 tons of oil and 23,000 cubic metres (810,000 cu ft) of natural gas per day. The well was drilled by SOCAR subsidiary Azeri Drilling Company Ltd. The well No. 247 was drilled by Bayil Limani Offshore Exploration Drilling Unit through platform No. 14. It produces 100 tonnes per day.

== Eastern deep water section ==
The deep water section of Gunashli (also called DWG) field has been included for development within the ACG project's Phase III. First oil from DWG was produced on 20 April 2008 from one of 10 pre-drilled wells. DWG now produces nearly 320,000 barrels per day (51,000 m^{3}/d) of the total 1 million barrels per day (160×10^{3} m^{3}/d) from ACG fields complex. ACG's DWG complex is located in the eastern side of the Gunashli field and includes two bridge-linked platforms:

- a 48-slot drilling, utilities and quarters (DUQ) platform
- a process, gas compression, water injection and utilities (PCWU) platform

Oil produced at DWG is transported through a 30-inch (760 mm) oil pipeline tie-ins and single 28-inch (710 mm) gas pipeline tie-in into pre-installed pipeline junctions from Azeri field leading to Sangachal Terminal. The DWG has 9 operating wells. It has been producing 16,800 tonnes of oil and 6.4 million cubic metres (230 million cubic feet) of natural gas per day.

== 1986 fire ==
In Soviet times, on 12 July 1986, a fire broke out on an exploration platform in the Gunashli oilfield. Three oil workers and two rescuers died. While the incident was blamed on an engineer, widespread rumors claimed that faulty and outdated equipment caused the fire. After this incident, a minor protest against government neglect took place in front of the Government House. Protestors were arrested and described as hooligans by the Soviet press.

== 2015 fire ==
On 4 December 2015, a deadly fire broke out in the northern part of platform No. 10 at the western section of the oilfield. The fire started, according to SOCAR, when a high-pressure underwater gas pipeline was damaged in a heavy storm. As a result of the fire, the platform, which had been in service since 1984, partially collapsed.

At the time of the accident, 63 workers were on the platform. According to the Ministry of Emergency Situations of Azerbaijan, seven workers were confirmed dead, 23 were missing, 33 were rescued; nine workers were hospitalized.

== See also ==
- Azeri–Chirag–Gunashli
- Baku–Tbilisi–Ceyhan pipeline
- Sangachal Terminal
- South Caucasus Pipeline
- Baku–Supsa Pipeline
- Baku–Novorossiysk pipeline
- Nabucco pipeline
- Baku–Novo Filya gas pipeline
- Nakhchivan field
