= Bahar oilfield =

Caspian Sea oil reservoir near Baku, Azerbaijan

Bahar oil field
- Country: Azerbaijan
- Offshore/onshore: Offshore
- Coordinates: 40.368°N 49.871°E
- Operator: SOCAR
- Partners: SOCAR, Bahar Energy Ltd

Field history
- Discovery: 1968
- Start of development: 1969

Production
- Estimated oil in place: 2.7 million tonnes (~ 3.1×10^{6} m^{3} or 20 million bbl)
- Estimated gas in place: 25×10^{9} m^{3} 18.4×10^{9} cu ft

Bahar is an offshore petroleum reservoir in the Caspian Sea, located 40 km (25 mi) southeast of Baku, Azerbaijan. The field was discovered in 1968 and was first developed in 1969. Prior to 2010, it produced approximately 16.8 million tonnes of oil and 128.7 billion cubic meters of gas. There had been up to 93 wells operating in the field during the peak of production; the number has since decreased to 16.

== Production sharing agreement ==
On December 22, 2009, the State Oil Company of Azerbaijan Republic and the Emirati company Bahar Energy Ltd signed a production sharing agreement for exploration, rehabilitation and development of Bahar and Gum Deniz fields. The agreement, which was reached by the President of SOCAR, Rovnag Abdullayev and General Director of Bahar Energy Ltd, Richard McDougall, is projected to last 25 years with the possibility of extension for five additional years. This was the 28th agreement SOCAR signed with a foreign investor on the basis of production sharing. Rovnag Abdullayev stated that SOCAR is planning to increase the overall gas production of Azerbaijan to 1 trillion cm.

According to the agreement, within the next 3 years, Bahar Energy Ltd will drill one exploration well. The first stage of the project includes drilling of 50 wells. In addition to that, all existing wells will be rehabilitated for production. It is estimated that the first stage of the project will bring nearly $2.5 billion of income to SOCAR. The second stage of the project consists of exploration of the Bahar-2 structure within the Bahar field.

According to the agreement, SOCAR will receive a bonus of $2 million when the project program is confirmed, $1 million for every 100 million barrels produced, $5 million when commercial production starts, and $2 million after increasing production capacity to 1.5 times the 2008 production indicators, as planned. In 2008, the field produced 54-55,000 tonnes of oil and 195 million cm of gas. Bahar Energy Ltd owns 80% of the stake, while SOCAR owns 20%. Previous forecasts indicated that in five years, gas and condensate production in Bahar field would decrease by 15% and 10%, respectively, which led to the idea of attracting foreign investment for stabilization of production. It is expected that Bahar Energy Ltd will invest nearly $1 billion in the project.

== Reservoir ==
It is estimated that Bahar field holds 2.7 million tonnes of oil and between 18.4 and 25 billion cubic meters of gas reserves. It contains oil and gas condensate in sandstone and sandy siltstone of the Pliocene Productive Series. The reservoir rocks have porosities of 13-18% and permeabilities of 45-250 mD. Biomarker geochemical analyses of onshore and offshore fields indicate that the Pliocene oil and gas fields in South Caspian Basin had been mainly charged from epigenetic hydrocarbons.

== See also ==
- Gum Deniz oilfield
- Azeri–Chirag–Gunashli
- Baku–Tbilisi–Ceyhan pipeline
- Sangachal Terminal
- Baku–Supsa Pipeline
- Nabucco pipeline
- Mozdok–Makhachkala–Kazi Magomed pipeline
