= Gum Deniz oilfield =

Azerbaijani oil field in the Caspian Sea

Gum Deniz is an offshore oil and gas field in the Caspian Sea, located 21 km (13 mi) southeast of Baku, Azerbaijan. The field has been in operation since 1955. Gum Deniz has produced approximately 28.9 million tonnes of oil and 27 billion cubic meters of gas to date. In March 2009, Azerbaijan drilled its last well No. 478 in the Gum Deniz field before a new production sharing agreement for development of the field was signed with a foreign company in December 2009. The well produces 50 tonnes of oil on a daily basis.

== New PSA agreement ==
On December 22, 2009, the State Oil Company of the Azerbaijan Republic and an Emirati company Bahar Energy Ltd signed a production sharing agreement for the exploration, rehabilitation and development of Bahar and Gumdeniz fields. The contract, preceded by an MOU earlier in April was signed by the President of SOCAR, Rovnag Abdullayev and General Director of Bahar Energy Ltd, Richard McDougall will last 25 years with possibility for extension of 5 more years. SOCAR announced this was the 28th agreement it signed with a foreign investor on production sharing terms. Rovnag Abdullayev emphasized that SOCAR is planning to increase the overall gas production of Azerbaijan to 1 trillion cm. According to the agreement, within the next 3 years, Bahar Energy Ltd will drill one exploration well.

The first stage of the project includes drilling 50 wells. In addition to that, all existing wells will be rehabilitated for production. It is estimated that the first stage of the project will bring a profit of $2.5 billion to SOCAR. The second stage of the project consists of the exploration of the Bahar-2 structure within the Bahar field. As per the agreement SOCAR is to receive a bonus of $2 million as soon as the project program is confirmed, $1 million for every 100 million barrels (16,000,000 m^{3}), $5 million once the commercial production starts and $2 million after an increase of production capacity by 1.5 times from 2008 production indicators, as planned. Bahar Energy Ltd owns 80% of the stake while SOCAR is entitled to 20%. It is expected that Bahar Energy Ltd will invest nearly $1 billion in the project.

== Reservoir ==
It is estimated that the Gum Deniz field holds 4.52 million tonnes of oil and 1.94 billion cubic meters of gas reserves.

== See also ==
- Bahar oilfield
- Azeri-Chirag-Guneshli
- Baku–Tbilisi–Ceyhan pipeline
- Sangachal Terminal
- Baku-Supsa pipeline
- Nabucco pipeline
- Baku-Novo Filya gas pipeline
