= Chirag oilfield =

Offshore oil field in the Caspian Sea

Chirag oil field
- Country: Azerbaijan
- Region: Caspian Sea
- Location: 120 km (75 mi) east of Baku
- Offshore/onshore: offshore
- Operator: BP
- Partners: Azerbaijan International Operating Company

Production
- Recoverable oil: 360 million barrels (~4.9×10^{7} t)

Chirag (Azerbaijani: Çıraq) is an offshore oil field in the Caspian Sea, located 120 km (75 mi) east of Baku, Azerbaijan, and is a part of the larger Azeri-Chirag-Guneshli (ACG) project. The production, drilling and quarters (PDQ) platform Chirag 1 (EOP) has been in operation since 1997. Chirag 1 has been producing the Early Oil from the ACG field. West Chirag is planned as an extension of ACG project.

== Chirag-1 and Early Oil Project ==
The Early Oil Project (EOP) has averaged between 100,000 and 150,000 barrels per day (16,000 and 24,000 m^{3}/d) of oil since the start of production. It was recognized as the first large-scale oil project in the Caspian Sea region. The project involved investment of $200 million from big financial institutions such as World Bank's IFC and the EBRD and included development of part of the Chirag oil field, namely refurbishment of an existing Chirag 1 platform, construction of new subsea pipelines, drilling of development and water injection wells; construction of Sangachal Terminal; construction of oil export terminal in Supsa, Georgia and completion of export pipelines and facilities in Azerbaijan and Georgia.

=== Ownership ===
The subsidiary of Amoco – Amoco Caspian Sea Petroleum Ltd was the operator for EOP. The partnership also included companies from United States, Russia, Turkey, United Kingdom, Norway, Japan and Azerbaijan.

Company	Share
Amoco Caspian Sea Petroleum	17%
Exxon Azerbaijan Ltd	8%
Lukoil Overseas BVI Ltd	10%
Turkiye Petrollero A.O. (TPAO)	6.8%
Unocal Khazar Ltd	10%
BP Exploration (Caspian Sea) Limited	17%
Den Norske Statsoljeskap a.s.	8.6%
State Oil Company of Azerbaijan Republic	10%
Itochu Corporation	3.9%
Pennzoil Caspian Corporation	4.8%
Ramco	2.1%
Delta	1.7%

Sponsors' share of the project costs are estimated at $800 million. IFC loans included five A loans (one to each one of the borrowers) equalling $100 million in total and five B Loans, also $100 million in total.

== Technical features ==
Chirag 1 facilities include:

- 24-slot PDQ platform with water injection equipment
- 176 km (109 mi) long 24-inch (610 mm) oil pipeline to the Sangachal Terminal just south of Baku
- 46 km (29 mi) long 16-inch (410 mm) gas pipeline to the Oil Rocks offshore town
- 12 km (7.5 mi) long 18-inch (460 mm) gas pipeline to Central Azeri
- Compression and water injection platform. This part of the field is forecasted to produce until 2024. Initially, the production from Chirag was exported through Baku–Novorossiysk pipeline. Once the Baku-Supsa pipeline became operational in 1999, the production was also directed through Georgia.

== West Chirag ==
In March 2009, KBR was awarded a contract by BP on behalf of Azerbaijan International Operating Company to provide front-end engineering and design (FEED) and procurement services for the Chirag drilling platform. This is considered to be an expansion of ACG field development and is also known as Chirag Oil Project. In September 2010, construction of steel jacket for West Chirag platform will be started. Construction will be conducted by Baku Deepwater Jacket Factory named after Heydar Aliyev. Project management plans West Chirag production to start in the second quarter of 2014. According to preliminary forecasts, the platform will produce 183,000 barrels per day (29,100 m^{3}/d) and 209 million cm^{3}/day and a total of 360 million barrels (57×10^{6} m^{3}) of oil at an investment cost of $6 billion. Gas produced from Chirag is planned to be exported to Europe in 2016.

== See also ==
- Azeri–Chirag–Gunashli
- Baku–Tbilisi–Ceyhan pipeline
- Sangachal Terminal
- South Caucasus Pipeline
- Baku–Supsa Pipeline
- Baku–Novorossiysk pipeline
- Nabucco pipeline
- Baku–Novo Filya gas pipeline
- Nakhchivan field
