= Pipelines in Azerbaijan =

Azerbaijan is one of the birthplaces of the oil industry and its history is linked to the fortunes of petroleum, with pipelines used from the late 19th century. The total length of the main pipeline in Azerbaijan is 4,600 kilometres (2,900 mi)

The centre of the country's oil industry and nexus of its pipelines are at Baku.

The first oil pipeline was formed in Absheron district in connection with oil production in the country. The total length of the country's oil pipeline is more than 1,500 kilometres (930 mi), with 80% of it located in the Absheron Economic Region. Important oil pipelines within the republic include: Shirvan–Baku (former Ali-Bayramly–Baku), 130 km (81 mi); Shirvan–Dashgil, 40 km (25 mi); Dubandi-Boyukshor, 40 km (25 mi); Dubandi-Keshla, 40 km (25 mi); Dashgil-Sangachal-Keshla, 90 km (56 mi); Buzovna-Sabunchu, 20 km (12 mi); and Binagadi-Keshla, 8 km (5.0 mi).

== Pipelines ==
There had been an oil industry at Baku since at least the 17th century. Beginning in the 19th century, pipelines were constructed to transport crude oil from the oil fields to the refineries. The first pipeline was constructed in 1878 by Baku Oil Refinery, connecting to Balakhani Mines. The 800-kilometre-long (500 mi) Baku–Batumi oil pipeline was put into operation in the beginning of the 20th century. Oil and gas field exploitation in Absheron and the Caspian Sea required the construction of new pipelines to Baku. These main oil pipelines are Alibayramly–Baku, Neftdashlari–Baku, and Siyazan–Baku. Natural gas is transported through Garadagh–Agstafa, Garadagh–Baku, Siyazan–Baku, Neftdashlari–Baku, and Zira–Baku pipelines.

The main route options for export pipelines (to Europe) are:

- Baku-Batum pipeline (1897-1907)
- Baku–Grozny–Novorossiysk (a.k.a. the northern route)
- Baku–Tbilisi–Supsa (the western route)
- Baku–Tbilisi–Ceyhan (main oil pipeline named after Heydar Aliyev)
- Baku–Tbilisi–Erzurum gas pipeline (a.k.a. Trans-Caspian Gas Pipeline)

=== Baku–Grozny–Tikhoretsk–Novorossiysk ===
The agreement for the northern route was signed on February 18, 1996, in Moscow. This pipeline transports Azerbaijani oil into the Russian Federation to the Black Sea port of Novorossiysk. The total length of the Baku–Grozny–Tikhoretsk–Novorossiysk (BGTN) oil pipeline is 1,347 km (837 mi), including 231 km (144 mi) in Azerbaijan. The transportation of Azerbaijani oil through the northern route started on October 25, 1997. A trilateral agreement signed among AIOC (Azerbaijan International Operating Company), SOCAR (State Oil Company of Azerbaijan Republic) and Transneft (the Russian state-owned pipeline company) includes all legal and technical issues of transportation of oil to Novorossiysk. Russia accepted in the agreement that the ownership of the oil remains with the producer, which is part of Azerbaijan's new oil strategy. It was intended to transport 2.5 thousand tons of crude oil per day through Dubandi–Boyukshor–Siyazan–Shirvanovka pipeline. 120 thousand tons of oil had been exported through the northern route by the end of 1997.

=== Baku–Tbilisi–Supsa ===
The second pipeline is the western route, Baku–Tbilisi–Supsa, made through an agreement between the presidents of Azerbaijan and Georgia on March 8, 1996. It has a total length of 920 km (570 mi) with 480 km (300 mi) in Azerbaijan. It transports primary Azeri oil from Azeri–Chirag–Gunashli fields through Baku. Trilateral contracts were signed among AIOC, SOCAR and the Georgian government. This line was put into operation on April 17, 1999, and exports 15 million tons of oil per year to Western countries It has lower operating costs than the northern route; transporting a ton of oil to Novorossiysk costs US$15.67, but to Supsa is $13.14. From the Georgian port of Supsa, oil can then be shipped via the Bosporus.

=== Baku–Tbilisi–Ceyhan ===
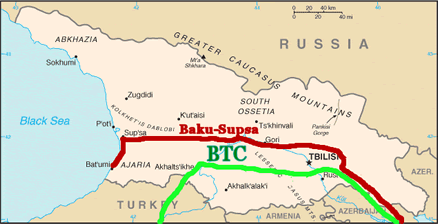

The Baku–Tbilisi–Ceyhan pipeline transports oil to the Turkish port of Ceyhan on the Caspian Sea for export to European markets through the Mediterranean. It has a total length of 1,768 km (1,099 mi) with 443 km (275 mi) in Azerbaijan, 249 km (155 mi) in Georgia and 1,076 km (669 mi) in Turkey. Since 2006, 50 million tons of oil per year is exported through this pipeline.

=== Baku–Tbilisi–Erzurum gas pipeline ===
A commercial agreement was signed on the sale of natural gas from Turkmenistan to Turkey, carried via pipeline through Azerbaijan and Georgia to the Turkish port of Erzurum in Turkey, from where it will be sold to Europe. The pipeline was planned to be 443 km (275 mi) long with a capacity of 30 billion cubic metres per year.

=== Trans-Anatolian gas pipeline ===
The Trans-Anatolian gas pipeline (TANAP) is planned to transport natural gas across Turkey, expanding the capacity from the South Caucasus pipeline. It is to start in Azerbaijan and connect to several pipelines in the European Union. The projected cost of the pipeline and associated infrastructure is US$7 billion. The first of four stages was to be completed in 2018. Planned capacity of the pipeline is 16 billion cubic meters in 2020, 23 billion cubic meters in 2023, and 31 billion cubic meters in 2026. During the first period, it is to be sold 10:6 to Europe and Turkey, with the European portion being transported through Turkey to Bulgaria or Greece.

=== Trans Adriatic gas pipeline ===
Wholly outside of Azerbaijan, the Trans Adriatic Pipeline project (TAP) would connect TANAP to European pipelines. The planned pipeline would connect to TANAP at the Greece–Turkey border, passing through Greece, Albania, and crossing the Adriatic Sea to Italy. In Italy, it is to connect with the "Snam Rete Gas" (SRG) network. The TAP project was chosen as the most direct way to export natural gas from Azerbaijan to European markets. An intergovernmental agreement was signed between Albania, Italy and Greece in February 2013.
