= Karabakh oilfield =

Azerbaijani oil field in the Caspian Sea

Karabagh
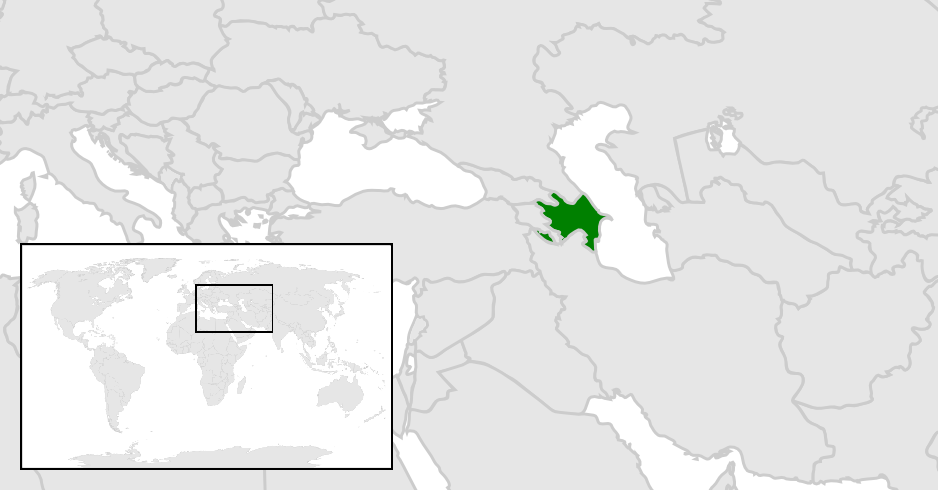
- Country: Azerbaijan
- Location: Caspian Sea
- Offshore/onshore: Offshore
- Partners: SOCAR(50%), Equinor (50%),

Field history
- Discovery: 1965

Karabagh (Azerbaijani: Qarabağ) is an offshore oil and gas field in the Caspian Sea, located 120 km (75 mi) east of Baku, Azerbaijan, in the northern part of Absheron archipelago. A risk service agreement (RSA) for the development of the Karabagh field was signed on 30 May 2018, between SOCAR and Equinor (Statoil). The Karabagh oilfield is located 120 kilometres east of Baku, close to the SOCAR operated Shallow Water Gunashli (SWG) field and the BP operated Azeri Chirag Gunashli (ACG) field.

== History ==
A production sharing agreement (PSA) for exploration and development of the Karabakh field was signed on 10 November 1995. It is considered to be Azerbaijan's second major contract for development of oil fields in the Caspian Sea after ACG project. The agreement had a development and production period of up to 25 years with possible extension of 5 more years. On 13 February 1996 the agreement was ratified by the Parliament of Azerbaijan Republic. The contract came into force on 28 February 1996. On 4 June 1996, the companies holding an interest in the project established a joint consortium and named it Caspian International Petroleum Company (CIPCO). CIPCO officially started operating in August 1996. On 26 January 1999, CIPCO announced it would cease its operations. According to the management of the consortium, the development of the field was not economically profitable at this stage. As per the president of the consortium, James Tilley, the drilling of 3 wells indicates the reservoir holds no more than 30 million tonnes of oil. CIPCO officially completed its operations on 23 February 1999. Total expenses incurred constituted nearly $100 million. In April 2006, SOCAR announced it would be able to develop the field itself without foreign investment. Total expenditures would reach close to $200 million. According to the vice-president of SOCAR, Khoshbakht Yusifzade, the feasibility study of two of the drilled wells revealed availability of 10 million tonnes of oil and 5-6 billion cubic meters of natural gas which draws a clear picture on recoverable reserves as a whole. Shareholders of CIPCO had the following stakes in Karabakh field: Company Interest LUKAgip JV 45%, Pennzoil 30%, LUKOIL 12.5%, SOCAR 7.5%, Agip 5%. According to the PSA agreement, the total bonus to be paid to Azerbaijan would have been $135 million. Total capital expenditures for the project were to be $1.7 billion. $1.3 billion was planned for operating costs.

== See also ==
- Azeri–Chirag–Gunashli
- Baku–Tbilisi–Ceyhan pipeline
- Sangachal Terminal
- South Caucasus Pipeline
- Baku–Supsa Pipeline
- Baku–Novorossiysk pipeline
- Nabucco pipeline
- Baku–Novo Filya gas pipeline
- Nakhchivan field
