= Azeri oilfield =

Azerbaijani oil field in the Caspian Sea

Azeri (Azerbaijani: Azəri) is an Azerbaijani offshore oil field in the Caspian Sea, located 100 km (62 mi) east of the capital Baku, and is a part of the larger Azeri-Chirag-Guneshli (ACG) project. The Azeri field includes the Central Azeri, West Azeri, East Azeri production platforms and the compression and water injection platform (C&WP). The field was discovered in 1988, and originally it was named after the 26 Baku Commissars.

== Central Azeri ==
Central Azeri is a production, drilling and quarters (PDQ) platform located in nearly 128 m (420 ft) depth of water in the central part of the Azeri field. The platform is constructed to produce approximately 420,000 bbl/d (67,000 m^{3}/d). The facilities on Central Azeri include:

- a 48-slot PDQ platform
- a 30-inch (760 mm) oil pipeline from the platform to the receiving Sangachal Terminal
- a 28-inch (710 mm) gas pipeline from the platform to Sangachal Terminal.

Central Azeri has started its operations in February 2005

== West Azeri ==
West Azeri is a production, drilling and quarters (PDQ) platform located in 120 m (390 ft) depth of water and was constructed to produce oil from the western section of Azeri field. West Azeri adds 300,000 bbl/d (48,000 m^{3}/d) to the overall ACG production. The facilities on West Azeri include:

- a 48-slot PDQ platform
- a 30-inch (760 mm) oil pipeline from the platform to the receiving Sangachal terminal

The platform has started its operations in December 2005.

== East Azeri ==
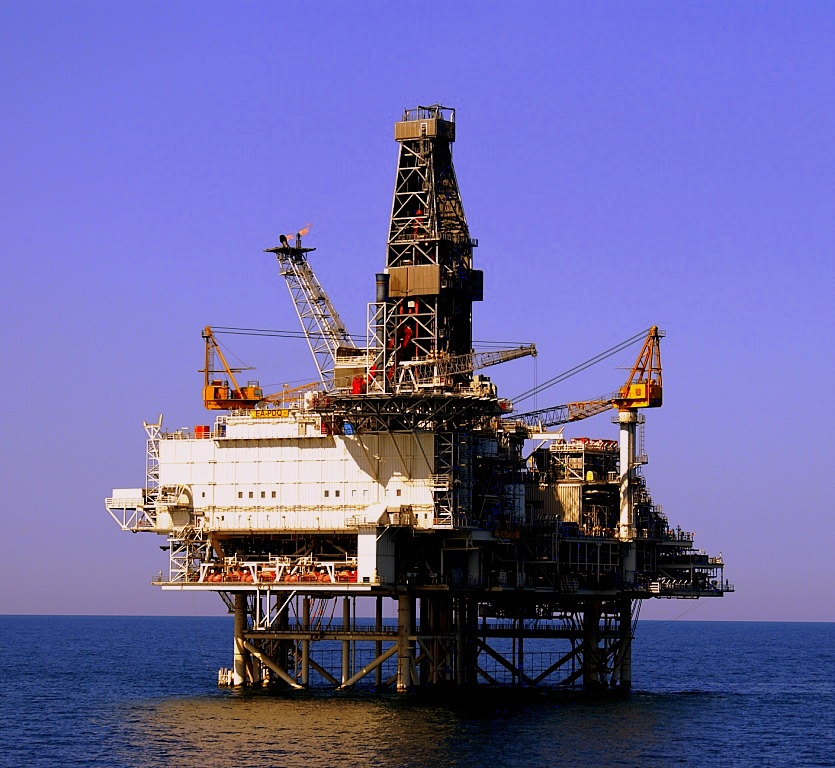
East Azeri oil platform, May 2008

East Azeri is a production, drilling and quarters (PDQ) platform located in 150 m (490 ft) depth of water and was constructed to produce oil from the eastern section of Azeri field. East Azeri produces 260,000 bbl/d (41,000 m^{3}/d). The facilities on East Azeri include:

- a 48-slot PDQ platform

The platform has started its operations in October 2006.

== Compression and water injection platform (C&WP) ==
The C&WP supplies Central, West, and East Azeri platforms with water and gas injection services; manages gas export; and provides electrical power using 10 Rolls-Royce turbines. The platform is bridge-linked to the Central Azeri platform.

Gas injection capacity at C&WP is 1 billion cubic feet per day (28 million cubic metres per day) utilizing 5 gas injection wells. Water injection capacity is 1 million barrels per day (160 thousand cubic metres per day) utilizing 12 water injection wells. Gas export capacity stands at 250 million cubic feet per day (7.1 million cubic metres per day). Azeri C&WP has some of the largest water injection pumps and gas injection compressors among BP platforms worldwide. The topsides have been constructed in the ATA (AMEC-Azfen-Tekfen) construction yard in Bibi-Heybat, Azerbaijan.

== 2008 gas leak and blowout ==
On 17 September 2008, a gas leak was discovered in the area of the Central Azeri platform after a blowout in a gas-injection well. The platform was shut down and the staff was evacuated. As the West Azeri Platform was being powered by a cable from the Central Azeri Platform, it was also shut down. BP, an operator of ACG, suspected a bad cement job caused the leaking gas. Production at the West Azeri Platform resumed on 9 October 2008 and at the Central Azeri Platform in December 2008.

== See also ==
- Azeri–Chirag–Gunashli
- Baku–Tbilisi–Ceyhan pipeline
- Sangachal Terminal
- South Caucasus Pipeline
- Baku–Supsa Pipeline
- Baku–Novorossiysk pipeline
- Nabucco pipeline
- Baku–Novo Filya gas pipeline
- Nakhchivan field
