= Reforms in Azerbaijan =

Azerbaijan has been ruled by the former Soviet Union for nearly 70 years. Azerbaijan gained its independence in October 1991 following the fall of the Soviet Union . Reestablishment of independent country has led to chaos and regression in the field of economy, education and health. In this regard, the Azerbaijani government signed the "Contract of century" and implemented reforms to develop the above-mentioned fields.

== Contract of the Century ==
The agreement was signed on September 20, 1994 in Gulistan Palace of Baku. The importance of the agreement made sides to name it as the “Contract of the Century”. The contract was aimed at the development of “Azeri-Chirag-Guneshli” deepwater oil fields containing more than 10 billion barrels of oil reserves. These aims of the contract were reflected on 400 pages and 4 languages. Thirteen companies (Amoco, BP, McDermott, Unocal, SOCAR, LukOil, Statoil, Exxon, TPAO, Pennzoil, Itochu, Ramco Energy, Delta) from eight countries (Azerbaijan, USA, Great-Britain, Russia, Turkey, Norway, Japan, Saudi Arabia) have supported the signature of the agreement. 41 oil companies from 19 countries signed 26 other contracts focusing on the “Contract of the Century”.

The sides have established working structures such as the Steering Committee, Azerbaijan International Operating Company (AIOC) and the Consulting Council following the signature of the contract. On December 2, the parliament of the Republic of Azerbaijan approved the “Contract of the Century”. The working structures started to carry out the contract after the alignment of the legal basis. Azeri-Chirag-Guneshli (ACG) fields began to produce oil in November 1997. Since that time, it produced four billion barrels of oil.

The contract has generated conditions for further projects in Azerbaijan. Furthermore, Azerbaijan has built reliable political and economic partnerships with many countries. In addition, there was significant increase in the investments made in the field of economy in Azerbaijan. More than $30 billion investments made in ACG.

The ACG participating interests are as following: BP owns 35.78% (operator), SOCAR – 11.65%, Chevron – 11.27%, Inpex – 10.96%, ExxonMobil – 8.0006%, Statoil – 8.56%, TPAO- 6.75%, Itochu – 4.3%, ONGC Videsh Ltd - 2.72%.

== Reforms ==
During the early 1990s, Azerbaijan experienced difficult economic transition which not only affected economy, but also the field of education and health. In order to improve the situation in the country, the Azerbaijani government pursued an active agenda of economic, educational and health reforms.

=== Economy ===
There were significant challenges in the economy of Azerbaijan, which resulted in a decrease in GDP during the early 1990s. In the years 1991-1995, there was an economy chaos and regression. However, the increase was observed in macroeconomic stability and dynamic economic development in 1996. International assistance has played an important role in facilitation of economic transition since 1992. At the same time, regional assistance also brought benefits to the economy.

The State Programme “On Business Development in Azerbaijan (1993-1995)” was adopted in 1993 to legalize economic reforms. Furthermore, Azerbaijan and the IMF reached an agreement on an economic reform programme in 1995 which restored the macroeconomic stability and progressive economic recovery. The stability of fiscal deficit was at around 4% of GDP and inflation was reduced to single figures. GDP rose by 20% between 1996 and 1998.

Azerbaijan has pursued a cohesive economic reform programme after the establishment of an independent Central Bank and introduction of a national currency. Macroeconomic stabilization, structural reform and addressing social needs were the main components of the programme .

The Azerbaijani government ratified the 1999-2000 privatization programme and discussions with the World Bank and other institutions in order to support the reorganizing and reform of public sector institutions and expenditure. During the privatization, the increase was observed in the specific weight of non-state sector in GDP from 29% in 1994 up to 81% in 2011. In addition, the flow of investment into country economy and social sectors of Azerbaijan dramatically rose by 100 billion USD from 2003 till 2011.

Furthermore, the State Oil Fund, which was founded in 1999, has implemented a number of activities since its establishment. Besides, financial security of population and economic development in the regions and rural areas were continuously increased in those years. In terms of social-economic development conception, Azerbaijan makes sure to be ready for the next and following three years in conformity with “Budget System” Law of Azerbaijan Republic. In 2011 “The social-economic development conception and forecasts of Azerbaijan Republic for 2012 and 2013-2015” was prepared to continue the above-mentioned state programmes.

Economic reforms paved the way to implement reforms in the health and education sectors.

=== Education ===
Azerbaijani government has held discussions to implement reforms in the education system since the 1990s. In 1998, the President issued a decree on the preparation of a program of Education Reform. Accordingly, reforms have been carried out in all systems of education following the confirmation of Education Reform Program in 1999. In this regard, structural changes have been applied in the higher education. In addition, network organization has been updated and expert training structures have involved new professions.

Furthermore, in 2000, the decree on the Improvement of the Education System in order to confirm the right to education, carry out the national education concept, guarantee the training and retraining of teacher, improve effectiveness in the use of physical infrastructure and human resources and found the Education Problems Institute. In 2001, a framework for education reform was added to the Conception of Education document covering the whole context of principal changes in social, economic, political and governmental structures. In the same year, Education Sector Reform Program (ESRP) was proposed to form the legislative, economic and information basis of the new system, facilitate the implementation of the reform and activities. The document was adopted in 2007. After implementation of the program, 2nd Education Sector Development Project has been carried out since 2009. The main goals of the project were to increase the effectiveness of teaching in-service training.

In 2005, Azerbaijan joined the Bologna principles to conduct reforms in higher education system.

In 2007, the Azerbaijani President Ilham Aliyev signed a “State Program on Azerbaijani citizens education abroad for the period of 2007-2015” to convert oil capital to human capital.

In this fashion, the “State Program on reforms in the higher education system in the Azerbaijan Republic in 2009-2013” was adopted in 2009 to integrate to the European Higher Education Area. In addition, the reform law on Education was adopted in 2009 to ensure the integration of Azerbaijani higher education institutions to the EHEA.

Furthermore, Azerbaijan planned a joint project with the World Bank - Second Education Sector Development Project (2009-2016) regarding the implementation of the general education curriculum and further curriculum reforms to successfully engage teachers, students and education managers in the comprehension of the new general education curriculum and to improve new learning materials and school libraries, modernizing in-service teacher training to support the education reform, building on the institutional framework supported by APL 1, using student assessment for education quality development to create a new evaluation and assessment culture in Azerbaijan.

In 2013, the Azerbaijani Government approved the Strategy for the Development of Education in Azerbaijan by 2025. The Action Plan for the strategy was adopted in 2015. The activities related to the strategy were implemented in 2015 and continuing now in 2017.

UNICEF’s annual report on Azerbaijan (2015) reflected UNICEF's support to Azerbaijan in the implementation of educational reforms. UNICEF assisted the Azerbaijani government to launch the first inclusive school in accordance with the report. Trainings were held for professionals and teachers on a model of special education. In this regard, the German model of inclusive education was started to be applied in accordance with the offer of the UNICEF.

The Ministry of Education of the Republic of Azerbaijan is the main executive body in the implementation of the above-mentioned reforms. The ministry proposes the reforms and then participates in the implementation process. In 2016, Azerbaijani government implemented the following reforms in different fields of education:

- In 2016-2017, more than 76000 children were involved in the pre-school education groups in Azerbaijan.
- Trainings were organized for directors of the general schools and pedagogical staff members who aim to work as directors in the future. The trainings were held for the pedagogical staff of the general schools in Ganja, Goygol, Samukh, Goranboy and Dashkesen. The main aims of the trainings include educating and improving the school directors who have modern management knowledge and skills, are familiar with information technologies and can contribute to educational and social development of the country.
- The public opinion was analyzed regarding fully improved 1st and 5th grade textbooks which were started in February 2016, as well as newly established 9th grade textbook projects. The opinions and suggestions on the textbook projects were obtained from the e-resurs.edu.az website of the MoE and derslik@edu.gov.az email address. 77 textbook projects are available on the website. 1544 opinions and suggestions were received. 91% of opinions is related to 9th grade, 6% to 5th grade and 3% to 1st grade textbooks.
- A number of newly prepeared e-books were increased to 156 from 143 in the www.e-derslik.edu.az e-textbook portal.
- The French-Azerbaijani University (UFAZ) started an academic year. 303 students, who scored 500 and over 500 in a university entrance exam of 1st groups, registered at the Azerbaijan State Oil and Industrial University. 120 of them were admitted with the state order and 40 paid their tuition fees at the UFAZ.

=== Health ===
Many casualties have increased the need for medical services in Azerbaijan in regard with the conflict between Azerbaijan and Armenia. In this regard, the discussions were held in 1998 to conduct systematic health reforms. The government achieved the establishment of the State Commission on health Reform. In 1999, the Commission published the first conceptual document for the health reforms.

Major laws and other legislation in the field of population health, 1999–2008

Title	Year
Law on Medical Insurance	1999
Law on Private Medical Practice	2000
Law on the Control of Tuberculosis	2000
Law on the Immunoprophylaxis of Infectious Diseases	2000
Law on Iodization of Salt for Mass Prevention of Iodine Deficiency	2001
Law on State Care for Persons with Diabetes	2003
Law on State Care for Persons with Haemophilia and Thalassaemia	2005
Law on Blood and Blood Component Donors and Blood Service	2005
Law on Oncology Care	2006
The Establishment of the State Agency on Mandatory Health Insurance	2007
The Concept for Health Financing Reforms and Introduction of Mandatory Health Insurance	2008

The reforms in the late 1990s and early 2000s were less effective as the Ministry of Health was less committed to the reforms. In early 2008, the Ministry of Health prepared draft version of a new and expanded version for the Concept for Health Care Reform together with WHO, World Bank, USAID and other international institutions. The Cabinet of Ministers approved the Action Plan to Introduce Health Financing Reforms in 2008. The policy changes have made to realize the goals for health financing reforms. The Cabinet of Ministers and the president adopted the Concept and Action Plan in 2008.

== Military ==
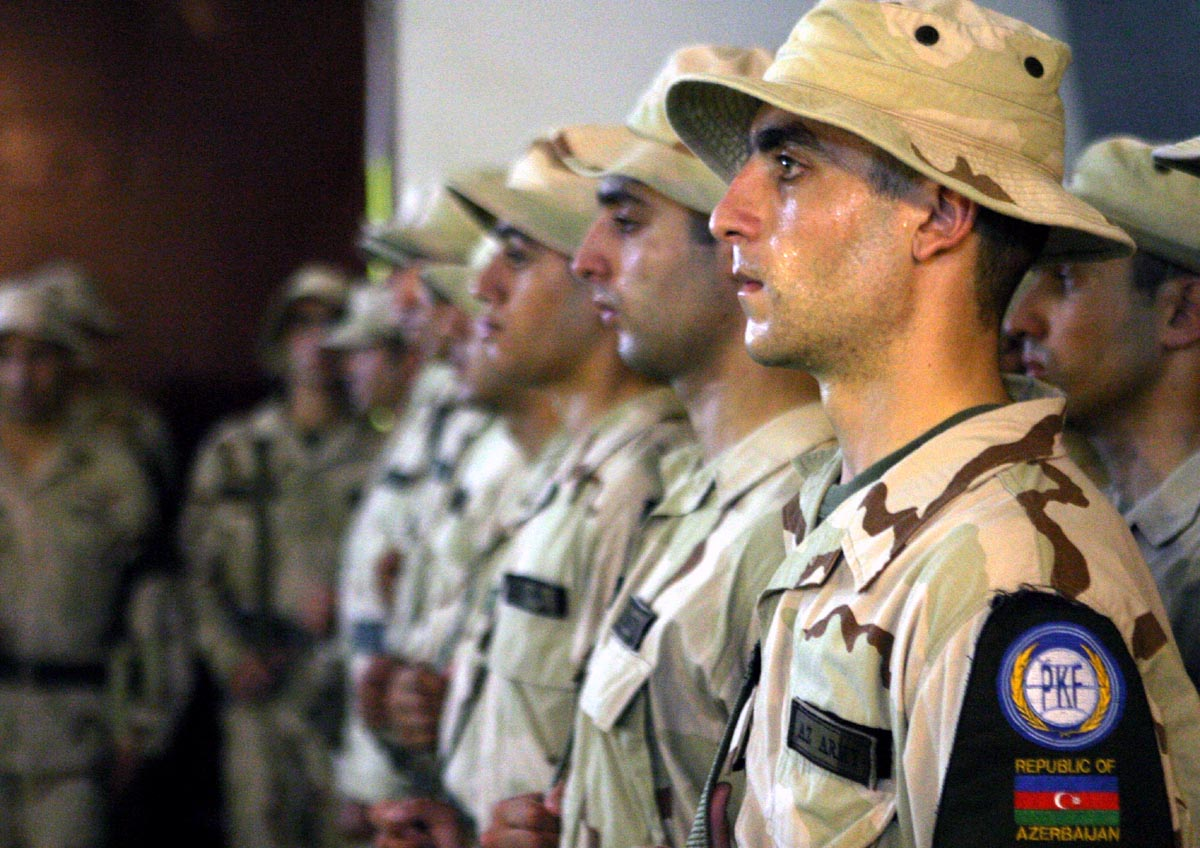
Azerbaijani soldiers in Iraq.

Azerbaijan and NATO signed Individual Partnership Action Plan (IPAP) in May 2005. The action plan aims to deal with defense and security issues in Azerbaijani society.

In the early 2000s, Azerbaijan started to produce its own military equipment and machines. In this manner, the Ministry of Defense Industry of Azerbaijan was established on December 16, 2005 under the presidential decree.

Approximately 130 defense goods were produced in Azerbaijan including Gurza patrol vehicles, 7.62 х 54 millimeter Gurza and Shimshek-10 machine guns, 7.62 х 51 millimeter Yalguzag, Istiglal-1T and Mubariz sniper rifles, 7.62 х 54 millimeter attack machine guns of HP-7.62 type. All produced weaponry meets the NATO standards.

Azerbaijan has built partnership with the NATO implementing military training and education programs since 1994. NATO's military education system standards have been applied in the Azerbaijan Higher Military Academy since 1997, in the War College of the Armed Forces since 2000, and in the Education and Training Center of the Armed Forces since 2001. Special forces are being trained to participate in international peacekeeping and humanitarian operations in terms of Individual Partnership Program (IPP). The program implementation fields include defense policy and strategy, language training; military exercises and related training; military education, etc.

Azerbaijan started to directly participate in NATO-led operations after joining the NATO's Operational Capability Concept Evaluation & Feedback program in March 2004. A peacekeeping platoon was established in 1997 and a peacekeeping battalion was founded in 2001. NATO provided assistance for the process of preparing key national strategic documents, to name but a few the National Security Concept (NSC), Military Doctrine (MD), and Strategic Defense Review (SDR). The President of Azerbaijan confirmed national Security Concept (NSC) on 23 May 2007. The Parliament of Azerbaijan adopted the Military Doctrine in June 2010.

In addition, Azerbaijan closely cooperates with Euro-Atlantic security institutions. This cooperation allowed Azerbaijan to contribute to international peace and security by participating in peace support operations, increase level of operational interoperability within the NATO Operational Capability Concept Evaluation and Feedback program, applied NATO standards in the Azerbaijani military, expand Azerbaijan's military education and training system, improve strategic conceptual documents, training professional personnel in fields relevant to cooperation, boost operational capability.

In 1992, the International Committee of the Red Cross started to operate in Azerbaijan in conformity with the conflict over Nagorno-Karabakh with Armenia. The committee deals the issues regarding missing persons and detainees held for conflict-oriented or security reasons. The ICRC works to protect and help population living close to the Line of Contact and the international border with Armenia.

In 1997, Azerbaijan established its peacekeeping troops and joined operations mainly implemented by NATO's International Security Assistance Force (ISAF) in Afghanistan. Azerbaijan is among the countries whose peacekeeping forces serves together in a USA Marine battalion.

In October 2009, the Azerbaijani parliament adopted a decision increasing the number of peacekeepers in Afghanistan to 90. The Azerbaijani peacekeeping platoon participated in peacekeeping and peace support operations in Kosovo from 1999-2008. In addition, Azerbaijani peacekeeping contingent served in Iraq from 2003-2008.
