= Baku oil pipeline =

Baku oil pipeline may refer to:

- Baku–Batumi pipeline
- Baku–Novorossiysk pipeline
- Baku–Tbilisi–Ceyhan pipeline, an oil pipeline from Azerbaijan to Turkey
