= Ashrafi field =

Oil field near Baku, Azerbaijan

Ashrafi
- Country: Azerbaijan
- Location: near Absheron peninsula
- Offshore/onshore: offshore
- Operator: SOCAR
- Partners: previously operated by North Absheron Operating Company (NAOC) consortium: Amoco (30%), SOCAR (20%), Itochu (20%), Unocal (25.5%), Delta Oil Company (4.5%)

Field history
- Discovery: 1970s
- Start of development: 1997

Production
- Estimated oil in place: 6 million tonnes (~ 7×10^{6} m^{3} or 40 million bbl)
- Estimated gas in place: 25×10^{9} m^{3} (880×10^{9} cu ft)

Ashrafi field is an oil and gas field located 105 km (65 mi) northeast of Baku, Azerbaijan, west of Karabakh field, in the northern section of Absheron archipelago.

== Dan Ulduzu-Ashrafi bloc ==
The Production sharing agreement (PSA) for exploration, development and production between SOCAR and NAOC consortium for Dan Ulduzu-Ashrafi bloc was signed on December 14, 1996. The contract area is 453 km^{2}. The water depth on location is 160 metres (520 ft) – 180 metres (590 ft). According to the agreement, 3 exploration wells would be drilled and if successful, the production would start in 2003 with an intended output to reach 7 million tons per year by 2007. Azerbaijan would also have been paid $75 million in bonuses. Total capital investment was estimated to be at $2.5 billion. After drilling of 3 exploration wells, 2 million tons of oil was discovered at Dan Ulduzu and 6 million tons was found at Ashrafi field in January 1998. During the exploration stage, in 1998–2001, the price for a barrel of oil was below $20. Due to low energy prices, the bloc was not considered commercially viable and was thus abandoned. On March 7, 2000, the contract for exploration ended and was not renewed by the consortium.

=== Ownership ===
The project was operated by North Absheron Operating Company (NAOC) which consisted of the operator Amoco (acquired by BP) (30%) and partners SOCAR (20%), Itochu (20%), Unocal (25.5%), Delta Oil Company (4.5%). The company had spent a total of $64.5 million for exploration. The initial right for development of the field was granted to Amoco and Unocal in 1992. The other partners joined in mid-1990s.

== Drilling renewed ==
In early 2004, SOCAR confirmed plans to revitalize the project at Dan Ulduzu and Ashrafi fields in 2007. SOCAR intends to drill 19 wells by 2015 which will require an investment of 2.76 billion Azerbaijani manats. In 2007, SOCAR signed a Memorandum of understanding with the German company Wintershall for exploration works at Ashrafi. Currently, the drilling is being carried out by semi submersible drilling vessel Dede Qorqud of Caspian Drilling Company, contracted by SOCAR.

== See also ==
- Dan Ulduzu field
- Azeri-Chirag-Guneshli
- Karabakh oilfield
