= Caspian pipeline =

Caspian pipeline may refer to:

- Caspian Pipeline Consortium, an oil pipeline from Kazakhstan to Russia
- Trans-Caspian Gas Pipeline, a planned natural gas pipeline from Turkmenistan to Azerbaijan
- Trans-Caspian Oil Pipeline, a proposed oil pipeline from Kazakhstan to Azerbaijan
- Pre Caspian Pipeline, North Caspian pipeline or Caspian Littoral Gas Pipeline, a planned amendment to the Central Asia–Center gas pipeline system
- Baku–Tbilisi–Ceyhan pipeline, an oil pipeline from Azerbaijan to Turkey
