= North Absheron Operating Company =

- Type: Private
- Industry: Petroleum
- Founded: 1997
- Founder: Amoco (30%), SOCAR (20%), Itochu (20%), Unocal (25.5%), Delta Oil Company (4.5%)
- Headquarters: Baku, Azerbaijan
- Key people: Thomas L. Klockenbrink (President)

North Absheron Operating Company (NAOC) was an international petroleum consortium based in Baku, Azerbaijan created to explore and develop the Dan Ulduzu and Ashrafi prospects in the Azerbaijani sector of the Caspian Sea. The company started its operations in 1997. On March 7, 2000 the company stopped operations after the management of company considered the contract was not financially profitable.

== Overview ==
NAOC was in charge of managing operations for Dan Ulduzu-Ashrafi bloc. The consortium consisted of operator Amoco (acquired by BP) (30%) and partners SOCAR (20%), Itochu (20%), Unocal (25.5%), Delta Oil Company (4.5%). The 25-year PSA agreement between Azerbaijani government and the companies was signed on December 14, 1996 and ratified by the Azerbaijani Parliament on February 25, 1997.

The PSA area covered some 453 km^{2} was located 105 km (65 mi) northeast of Baku and are believed to contain reserves of approximately 1 billion barrels and 65 billion cm of gas. The first exploration well Ashrafi-1 was drilled in February 1998. The results indicated 620,000 cm and 3,400 bbl per day.

Although the estimated investment foreseen for the project was $2 billion, over the period of exploration operations the company spent only a total of $64.5 million. The initial right for development of the field was granted to Amoco and Unocal in 1992. The other partners joined in mid-1990s.

== Humanitarian projects in Azerbaijan ==
NAOC was also involved in charity and humanitarian projects in Azerbaijan. The consortium paid for construction of housing for 100 Azerbaijani families that became refugees and IDPs displaced from their homes during the first Nagorno-Karabakh War. The housing complex is located in Mingachevir city. Construction of five community centers for refugees were also funded by NAOC through Relief International. Partial funding was also extended to Counterpart International for assistance with supplies for orphanages.

== See also ==
- Dan Ulduzu field
- Ashrafi field
- Azeri-Chirag-Guneshli
- SOCAR
