= NAOC =

NAOC may refer to:

- National Astronomical Observatories, Chinese Academy of Sciences (中国科学院国家天文台)
- Nagano Olympic Organizing Committee of the 1998 Winter Olympic Games
- National Airborne Operations Center, the Boeing E-4B aircraft
- The New Adventures of Old Christine, an American comedy series starring Julia Louis-Dreyfus
- New American Opportunity Campaign, a campaign of the Coalition for Comprehensive Immigration Reform
- Netherlands Antilles Olympic Committee, the National Olympic Committee of Curaçao, Sint Maarten, Bonaire, Sint Eustatius and Saba
- Nigerian Agip Oil Company, Nigerian company owned by Oando PLC
- North Absheron Operating Company, oil consortium established in Azerbaijan for development of Dan Ulduzu and Ashrafi oil and gas fields
- North American Orienteering Championships, a biannual orienteering competition hosted by Canada and the United States
