= AIOC =

AIOC may refer to:

- Anglo-Iranian Oil Company
- Azerbaijan International Operating Company
