= Baku–Batumi pipeline =

Oil pipe

The Baku–Batumi pipeline is the name given to several pipeline projects to transport kerosene and crude oil from the Caspian region to the Georgian Batumi oil terminal at the Black Sea. When first constructed in 1906, it was the world's longest kerosene pipeline.

== Kerosene pipeline ==
Together with oil developments in the Baku area, the need for construction of the oil pipeline from Baku to the Black Sea rose. In 1877–78, Herbert W. C. Tweddle, an American oil engineer and chemist, and Konstantin Bodisko, an official of the Russian Ministry of Finance, proposed four options for the Caspian–Black Sea oil pipelines. The pipeline proposal was also submitted by Russian mining engineer and industrialist Ivan Ilimov in 1878. In 1880, Dmitri Mendeleev proposed the construction of the Baku–Batum pipeline to ensure the transportation of Baku oil to the world market.

The idea got momentum in 1883, after the opening of the South Caucasus Railway. In 1884, the chief engineer Vladimir Shukhov of engineering company Bari, Sytenko & Co. published a draft and estimate of the Baku–Batum oil pipeline. The pipeline technical project was later designed by Shukhov. In 1885, Ivan Ilimov established the Caspian and Black Sea Oil Pipeline company. The concession to establish the Society of the Caspian–Black Sea Oil Pipeline was granted to Ilimov in December 1887. However, the proposed financial scheme was not accepted and in 1891 the pipeline construction was postponed as premature.

In 1886, a group of Baku industrialists asked for permission to construct their own Trans-Caucasian pipeline. The idea was backed by Azerbaijani industrialist Zeynalabdin Taghiyev who wrote a letter to Prince Alexander Mikhailovich Dondukov-Korsakov, the governor of the Caucasus. Local businessmen led by Aghabala Quliyev set up a joint-stock company for the pipeline construction. However, the government decision to proceed was adopted only in 1893.

On 23 May 1896, the State Council of Russia adopted a decision to construct the pipeline along the Trans-Caucasian Railway and preparatory works started the same year. In the first stage, the Batum–Mikhailovo (Khashuri) section was constructed, which was finished in 1906. The pipeline was funded by Russian-Armenian oil tycoon Alexander Mantashev (then owner of A.I. Mantashev & Co., the third largest oil company in Baku by 1904). The official opening took place on 24 July 1907 in Tiflisi (Tbilisi).

The first pipeline was a kerosene pipeline with a total length of 885 km (550 mi) and 16 pumping stations. The diameter of the pipeline was mainly 8 inches (200 mm), but some parts had a diameter of 10 inches (250 mm) and 12 inches (300 mm). The pipes were produced at plants in Mariupol, Sosnovitsy, and Yekaterinoslav (now: Dnipro). The initial pipeline capacity was 980,000 tons of kerosene per annum. Pumping stations were equipped with plunger pumps of Worthington Corporation, driven by steam and diesel engines. The pipeline was the longest pipeline in the world at the time.

After the Bolshevik Revolution, kerosene deliveries through the pipeline were relaunched in March 1921 and on 20 May 1921, the first delivery of kerosene arrived at Batum. After 1936 Batum was renamed to Batumi. In 1925, the kerosene pipeline was refitted as an oil pipeline.

== Crude oil pipeline ==
The project for a new pipeline (second line) was proposed in 1924. In 1925, the Soviet Union held negotiations with French companies to set up a joint venture to construct and operate the Baku–Batum crude oil pipeline. The intention was to use the pipeline for oil export to Europe, mainly to France. However, the negotiations failed as did negotiations with United States companies. In 1927, the construction of the pipeline was awarded to Azneft, an Azerbaijani oil company. The project designer and construction manager was A.V. Bulgakov.

The construction started in May 1928 and the pipeline was opened on 30 April 1930. It mainly supplied Batum's refinery.

The crude oil pipeline had a diameter of 10 inches (250 mm) and the length was 834 kilometres (518 mi). The pipeline had 13 pumping stations, each equipped with three diesel pumps of 360 hp. The pipeline used over 60,000 German-manufactured pipes weighing a total of over 54,000 tons. Diesels for the pipeline were purchased from MAN AG, the pumps from Crossley and the generators from Theodor Bergmann.

Construction work was done on three sections simultaneously. The highest point was 823 metres (2,700 ft) above sea level. The first 21 km (13 mi) long section Batum—Mikhailovo (Khashuri) was completed on 13 February 1929, the second 363 km (226 mi) long section Mingechaur (Mingachevir)–Mikhailovo (Khashuri) was completed on 15 December 1929, and the third 248 km (154 mi) long section Baku–Mingechaur (Mingachevir) was completed on 13 February 1930. The pipeline cost 49 million rubles.

The pipeline was incapable of transporting oil in the planned amount and the capacity needed to be increased by 750,000 tons. In August 1942, the pipeline was dismantled in connection with the threat of penetration of German troops in that direction and its pipes were used for the construction of the Astrakhan–Saratov pipeline. In the 1990s, some parts of the pipeline were used for the construction of the Baku–Supsa Pipeline.

== Proposed new pipelines ==
There have been several proposals for a new Baku–Batumi pipeline. In 1994–1998, the Baku–Supsa Pipeline, which partly used old Baku–Batum pipeline piping, was constructed. On 2 March 1998, Chevron Corporation agreed to reconstruct the preexisting Khashuri–Batumi pipeline and construct the Dubandi (Baku)–Khashuri pipeline. However, in May 2001 Chevron canceled this project and started to ship its oil from Tengiz Field through the CPC pipeline.

Kazakhstan's national oil company KazMunayGas, owner of the Batumi Oil Terminal, has shown interest in building a new Baku–Batumi pipeline, together with the proposed Trans-Caspian and Batumi–Constanţa connections which would supply KazMunayGas oil refineries in Romania (Rompetrol) and a planned refinery in Batumi.

== See also ==
- Energy in Georgia (country)
