= Oil and gas agreement =

The oil and gas industry operates in countries throughout the world in accordance with a number of different types of agreements. These agreements generally fall into one of four categories (or a combination of the categories): risk agreements, concessions, production sharing agreements (PSAs, also known as production sharing contracts, PSCs) and service contracts.

== Overview ==
Traditional concession agreements pre-1940 were granted for large areas, sometimes the whole country e.g. Iraq, and those grants were for long term (50 to 99 years). This caused developments to be delayed, postponed or the expected investment did not immediately materialise. This was clear against host governments interest. The contracts did not foresee any relinquishment of non explored areas. Further more traditional concession agreements granted petroleum "in situ" to the IOC, with market and pricing powers. The royalties were flat or fixed for per unit rates and sometimes credited against income taxes. There were no or low signature bonus and sometimes no income taxation. Those terms were often "frozen" for the life of the agreement.

== Modification ==
After the Second World War host governments relocated economic rents with the aim of increasing passive profit sharing. Towards the 1960s and 1970s governments started to demand more active profit sharing through NOC Joint Ventures Participation.

Participation agreements: the NOC is "Carried" by an International Oil Company (IOC). The NOC burdens the IOC by not fully compensate the IOC for the risks assumed during exploration or to make a commercial discovery. The IOC faces the full losses and thus needs bigger success to compensate depending on NOC's share on the joint venture. However, the IOC benefit for example by having the NOC as partner when faced with nationalistic threats.

== See also ==
- Iraq oil law (2007)
- Production sharing agreement
