= Minami-Nagaoka Gas Field =

Gas field in Nagaoka, Japan

Coordinates: 37°23′18″N 138°46′06″E

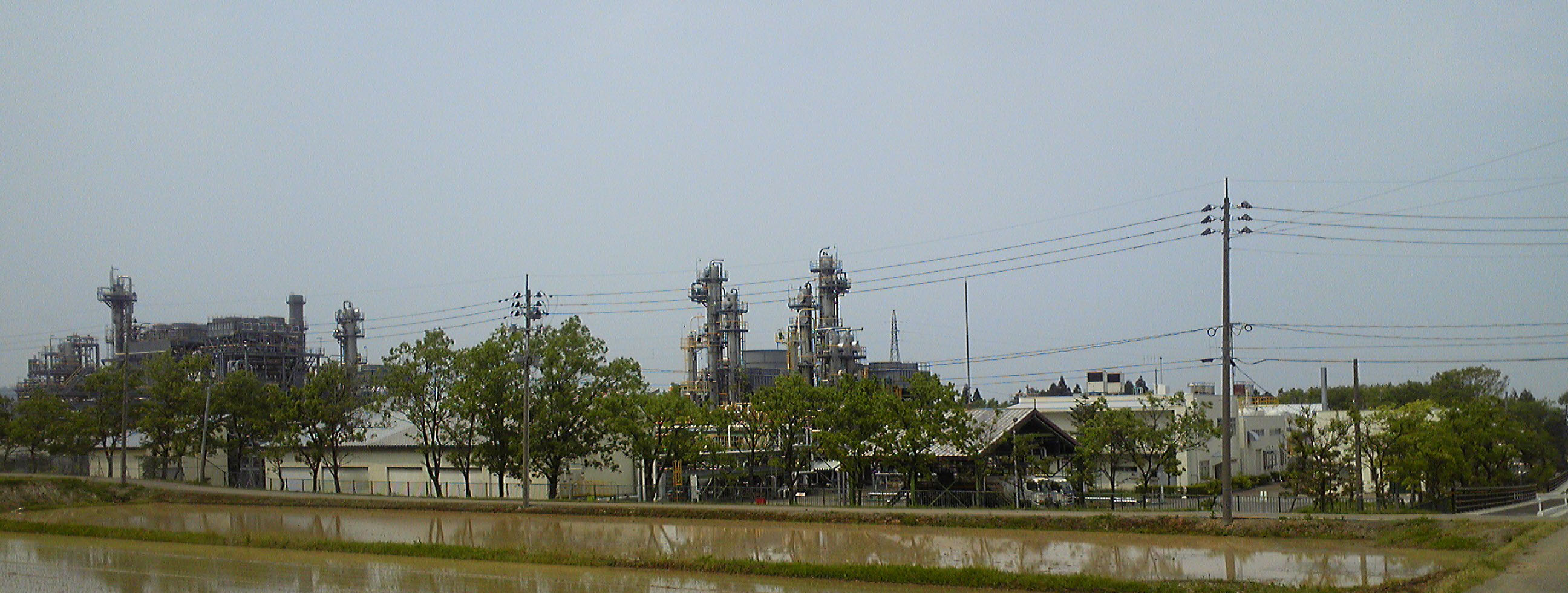
Koshijihara Gas Plant

The Minami-Nagaoka Gas Field (南長岡ガス田, Minami Nagaoka Gasu-den) is a gas field located in the southwest of Nagaoka, Niigata Prefecture, Japan. It was discovered in 1979 and is developed by INPEX Corporation. One of the largest in Japan, the field has been in production since 1984, with the completion of the Koshijihara Gas Plant. Even after more than 25 years of continuous output, Minami-Nagaoka still accounts for approximately 40% of Japan's total natural gas production.
