= Trans-Caspian Oil Transport System =

The Trans-Caspian Oil Transport System is a proposed project to transport oil through the Caspian Sea from Kazakhstani Caspian oilfields to Baku in Azerbaijan for further transportation to the Mediterranean or Black Sea coast. The main options under consideration are an offshore oil pipeline from Kazakhstan to Azerbaijan, and construction of oil terminals and oil tankers fleet. A strong push for the project has been from the partners of the Kashagan oilfield project and in particular Total, who has a share in both the field and the Baku–Tbilisi–Ceyhan (BTC) pipeline. They have estimated that such a project would cost roughly US$4 billion. The project also faces opposition from Iran and Russia, both alternative avenues for Kazakhstan's oil and gas who would likely object to competing pipelines being built.

== History ==
In 2005, the Government of Kazakhstan adopted plans for the creation of a trans-Caspian westbound route for oil export. On 19 June 2006, President of Kazakhstan Nursultan Nazarbayev and President of Azerbaijan Ilham Aliyev signed a framework agreement on the trans-Caspian oil transport system. On 24 January 2007, partners in Tengiz Chevroil (developer of Tengiz field) and KCO (Kashagan field developer) signed a memorandum of understanding to create a trans-Caspian oil transport system. On 2 October 2009, the national oil company of Kazakhstan Kazmunaygas and the State Oil Company of Azerbaijan Republic signed a memorandum of understanding to expand the Caspian Oil Transport System to include Azeri infrastructure and onshore pipelines from Baku to Kulevi oil terminal in Georgia.

On 6 October 2009, an agreement on the oil pipeline from Kashagan to Baku was signed by consortium of French companies during the French President Nicolas Sarkozy's visit to Kazakhstan.

== Oil pipeline ==
Under the initial proposals, a 700-kilometre (430 mi) long oil pipeline would run from the Kashagan field or Kuryk to Baku. As of 2009, work on the pipeline was still in the feasibility stage according to an official from the oil company Total.

== Shuttle tankers system ==
The shuttle tankers system envisages a usage of oil tankers to transport oil from Kuryk terminal in Kazakhstan to Sangachal Terminal in Azerbaijan. The capacity of this system would be 500,000 barrels per day (79,000 m^{3}/d) in the initial stage, rising later up to 1.2 million barrels per day (190×10^{3} m^{3}/d).

== See also ==
- Framework Convention for the Protection of the Marine Environment of the Caspian Sea
- Kulevi oil terminal
- Trans-Caspian Gas Pipeline
