= Supsa =

Supsa სუფსა
- Village
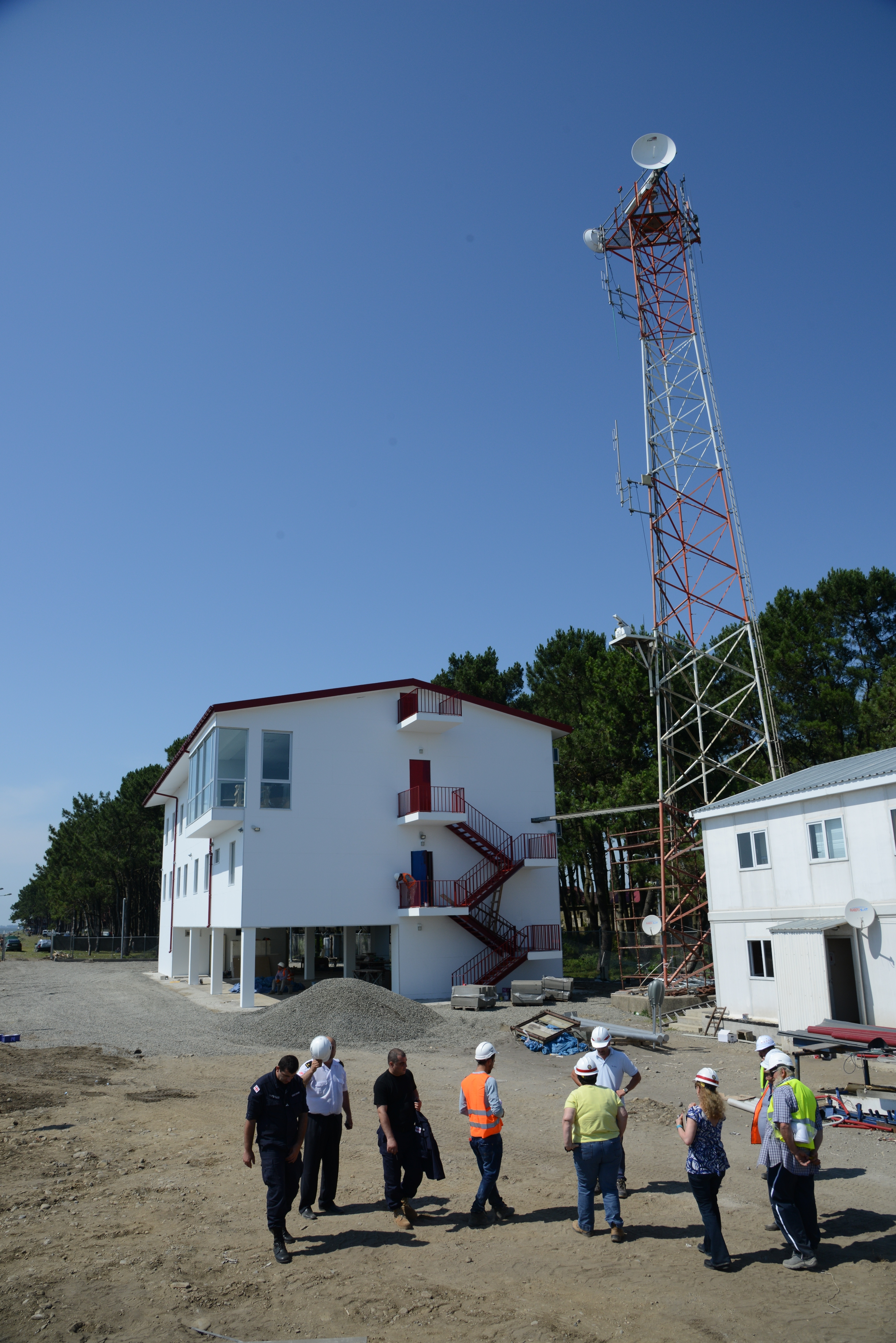
- Georgian coast guard facility in Supsa

- Location in Georgia Supsa (Georgia)
- Coordinates: 42°02′29″N 41°48′42″E
- Country: (Georgia (country)) Georgia
- Region: Guria
- District: Lanchkhuti
- Elevation: 7 m (23 ft)

Population (2014)
  - Total: 273
- Time zone: UTC+4 (Georgian Time)

Port of Supsa
- Interactive map of Port of Supsa

Location
- Country: Georgia
- Location: Supsa
- UN/LOCODE: GESPS

Supsa (Georgian: სუფსა) is a Black Sea village in western Georgia with a population of 273 as of 2014. It is located in the Lanchkhuti Municipality, on the river Supsa.

It is the terminus of the Western Early Oil pipeline from Azerbaijan and the Caspian Sea oil fields. In 2011 a cement plant was put into operation. There is a railway station (Samtredia–Batumi railway) in the village. European route E692 passes Supsa which has a junction with European route E70 near the village.

== See also ==
- List of ports in Georgia (country)
