= Inpex =

Japanese oil company

INPEX Corporation

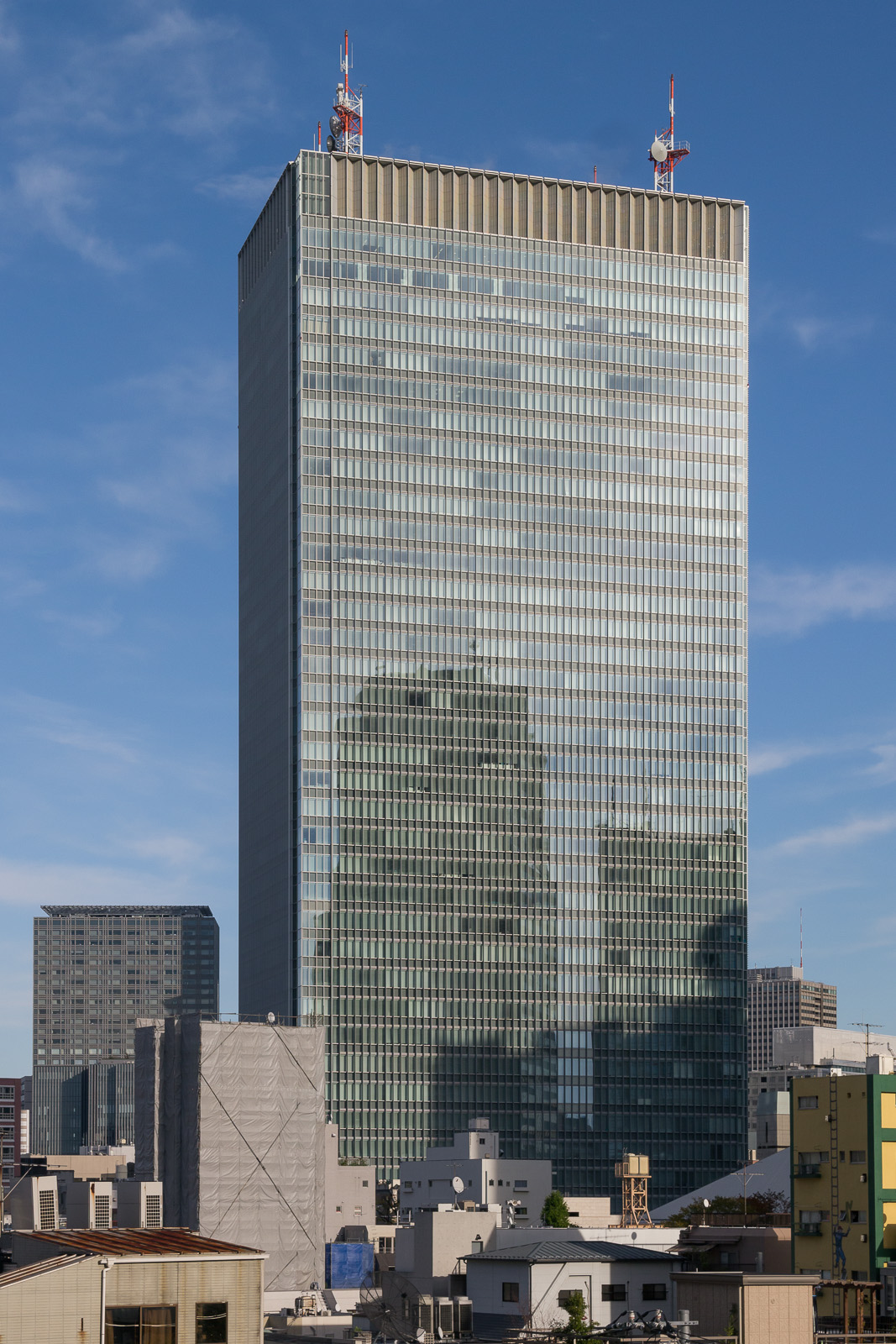
- Headquarters in Akasaka, Tokyo
- Native name: 株式会社INPEX
- Romanized name: Kokusai Sekiyu Kaihatsu-Teiseki kabushiki gaisha "International Petroleum Exploration-Teikoku Oil stock company"
- Type: Public KK
- Traded as: TYO: 1605; Nikkei 225 component TOPIX Large70 component
- Industry: Petroleum
- Founded: 1941 (as Teikoku Oil); 1966 (as North Sumatra Offshore Petroleum Exploration after contract with Pertamina predecessor)
- Headquarters: Akasaka Biz Tower 5-3-1 Akasaka, Minato-ku, Tokyo 107-6332 Japan
- Key people: Kunihiko Matsuo, Chairman; Naoki Kuroda, President
- Revenue: ▲¥ 2,324.6 billion JPY (FY 2022)
- Net income: ▲¥ 438.2 billion JPY (FY 2022)
- Owner: JOGMEC (18.96%)
- Number of employees: 2,146 (784 temporary workers) (2011)
- Website: https://www.inpex.co.jp/

INPEX Corporation is a Japanese oil company established in February 1966 as North Sumatra Offshore Petroleum Exploration Co., Ltd. INPEX is the largest oil and gas exploration and production company in Japan, with global exploration, development and production projects in 20 countries. In the 2020 Forbes Global 2000, INPEX was ranked as the 597th-largest public company in the world.

== Public listing ==
INPEX was listed on the first section of the Tokyo Stock Exchange on November 17, 2004 when the indebted Japan National Oil Corporation (JNOC), now part of the Japan Oil, Gas and Metals National Corporation, which at that time owned a 53.96% stake in INPEX, put up for sale 343,725 shares (17.9 percent of INPEX's 1.92 million outstanding shares). At the time, 18.9 percent of the company was owned by METI. It was the second of JNOC's subsidiaries to go public, after the Japan Petroleum Exploration Company in December 2003.

== Merger ==
As a result of a government-orchestrated merger, INPEX Corporation and Teikoku Oil agree to form INPEX Holdings on April 3, 2006. On October 1, 2008, the merger was completed with Inpex Corporation being formed from INPEX Holdings, INPEX, and Teikoku Oil, and the headquarters were moved to Akasaka, Tokyo.

The Mahakam Bloc, the original INPEX's first site, was nationalized by the Government of Indonesia in 2018, and is currently operated by Pertamina.

=== Teikoku Oil ===
Teikoku Oil Company Ltd was founded as a semi-governmental company to unify the existing Japanese oil exploration companies in 1941.

- 1950 Commerced development at Yabase oil field, Akita, Japan
- 1959 Kubiki oil and gas field commenced production
- 1962 Completed Japan's first long-distance natural gas pipeline between Tokyo and Niigata Prefecture
- 1965 Completed development at Minami-Aga oil field
- 1970 Higashi-Kashiwazaki gas field commenced production
- 1975 Completed development of overseas project at Democratic Republic of Congo
- 1980 West Bakr block of Egypt commenced production (sold in 2012 after cumulative production of approximately 50 million barrels of oil)

== Staff ==
In the fiscal year 2011 the company had 2,146 staff, with 784 temporary employees. As at 31 December 2019, INPEX had 3,117 employees on a consolidated basis.

As of March 31, 2010, the INPEX Labor Union has 1,030 members. The company has a labor-management council and regular meetings are held.

== Projects ==
=== Operations in Japan ===
The main focus of the company's operations in Japan is the Minami-Nagaoka Gas Field in Niigata Prefecture. INPEX also operates the Naoetsu LNG receiving terminal in Niigata and a natural gas pipeline network of approximately 1,500 km to connect to gas customers within Japan.

=== Ichthys ===
INPEX created a venture company called INPEX Browse, Ltd on 1 September 1998. This was for a previously wholly owned INPEX project in the offshore Basin off the north west coast of Western Australia where a gas-field was discovered in the WA-285-P permit area. The official name of the proposed development project was to be the Ichthys (gas-field) Development, which the company wanted to base on the Maret Islands. After farming out 24% of the permit ownership to Total S.A.'s subsidiary Total E&P Australia the concept and location was changed.

The location of this project, and the issue of industrialising the Kimberley coast was under discussion in Australia at the time. Environmentalists and local ecotourism operators ware concerned about industrial infrastructure destroying the pristine nature of this coast line.

The original project consisted of an offshore Central Processing Facilities (CPF), supplying two phase gas to an onshore facility on the Maret Islands. The facilities on the Maret Islands were to include gas receiving, LNG process plant (2 x 3.8Mtpa trains), product storage and export facilities. The Maret Islands are located approximately 200 km south-east of the Ichthys Field, which is approx. 440 km north of Broome and 800 km south west of Darwin.

The project for the LNG plant to be located on the isolated Maret Islands was scrapped with the LNG Plant now to be built at Bladin Point industrial site which is located on the Middle Arm Peninsula in Darwin, Northern Territory, with a 889 kilometres (552 mi) pipeline from the lchthys Field to the LNG Plant, after regulatory delays in Western Australia.

The Ichthys Project's Front-End Engineering Design (FEED) was completed in April 2011. Final Investment Decision (FID) was announced on 13 January 2012.

In January 2012 INPEX said the 8.4 million tonne per annum (mtpa) project near Darwin will cost about $34 billion, some 60 per cent more than INPEX's original estimate of $20 billion. INPEX said it and French energy company Total, its joint venture partner, had given the final approval to the project. Total had expressed interest in increasing its stake in the project from 24% to 30%, and negotiations between the two companies were underway.

The project was estimated to contribute $3.5 billion into the Australian economy each year, and require around 2,700 workers during peak construction, and another 300 jobs ongoing once it is operational.

The EPC early works phase, such as commencement of site development, infrastructure works and accommodation village and dredging began in 2012. LNG Production in the magnitude of app. 8.4mtpa is projected to be online by fourth quarter of 2016. The first shipment from the Ichthys LNG plant was made in October 2018.

=== Abadi ===
The Abadi gas field is a natural gas field located in the Arafura Sea in Tanimbar, Mollucas, Indonesia. Inpex discovered it in 2000 when the Abadi-1 exploratory well was drilled, and then developed it. This marked the first discovery of crude oil and natural gas in the Arafura Sea.

In November 2008, INPEX acquired a 100 per cent participating interest in the Masela Block in Indonesia.

A development plan was submitted to the Indonesian government and subsequently approved. Preparatory measures for Front-End Engineering Design were in place in 2011. In 2012, production of natural gas and condensates was expected to begin in 2015. The total proven reserves of the Abadi gas field were around 10 trillion cubic feet (242 billion m^{3}), and production was slated to be around 974 million cubic feet/day (2.74 million m^{3}) in 2015.

In 2017 the company was ready to start the Pre FEED phase and hold a joint workshop with SKK Migas.

=== Eurasia region ===
INPEX is a minority shareholder in the Kashagan Field in Kazakhstan and the Azeri-Chirag-Guneshli project, offshore Azerbaijan in the Caspian Sea.

== See also ==
- List of gas fields in Indonesia
