= Azerbaijan International Operating Company =

Azerbaijan International Operating Company is a consortium formed to implement the terms of the “Agreement on the Joint Development and Production Sharing for the Azeri and Chirag Fields and the Deep Water Portion of the Gunashli Field in the Azerbaijan Sector of the Caspian Sea” signed among SOCAR and international companies.

== History ==
The consortium was established in February 1995 after the Production Sharing Agreement (PSA) was ratified by Parliament of Azerbaijan on December 2, 1994. AIOC initially consisted of 11 companies (BP, Amoco, Unocal, LUKoil, Statoil, Exxon, TPAO, Pennzoil, McDermott, Ramco, and Delta Nimir) representing 6 countries (UK, USA, Russia, Norway, Turkey and Saudi Arabia). BP is the single biggest shareholder.

SOCAR and co-venturers (BP, Chevron, INPEX, Statoil, ExxonMobil, TP, ITOCHU and ONGC Videsh) signed the amended and restated Azeri-Chirag-Deepwater Gunashli PSA on September 14, 2017, and extended the development of this field until 2050.

== Overview ==
Azerbaijan International Operating Company is a consortium of currently 10 petroleum companies that have signed extraction contracts with Azerbaijan. These companies include:

- BP (UK)
- Chevron (United States)
- Devon Energy (USA)
- Equinor (Norway)
- Türkiye Petrolleri Anonim Ortaklığı (TPAO; Turkey)
- Amerada Hess (USA)
- State Oil Company of Azerbaijan (SOCAR; Azerbaijan)
- ExxonMobil (USA)
- Inpex (Japan)
- Itochu (Japan)

The AIOC made significant investment contributing to the construction of the South Caucasus Pipeline, the Baku-Tbilisi-Ceyhan Pipeline, and are currently discussing construction of a Trans-Caspian Oil Pipeline between Kazakhstan and Azerbaijan. Extraction of oil from the Azeri-Chirag-Guneshli fields and natural gas from Shah Deniz has been possible through foreign direct investment in this consortium.

According to the latest agreement, the shares will be as follows Milli Majlis ratifies the contract signed on September 14, 2017:

BP	30.37%	SOCAR	25.00%	Chevron	9.57%
INPEX	9.31%	Statoil	7.27%	ExxonMobil	6.79%
TP	5.73%	ITOCHU	3.65%	ONGC Videsh Limited	2.31%

== See also ==
- SOCAR
- Azeri-Chirag-Gunashli
- Petroleum industry in Azerbaijan
