= Rovnag Abdullayev =

Azerbaijani businessman and politician

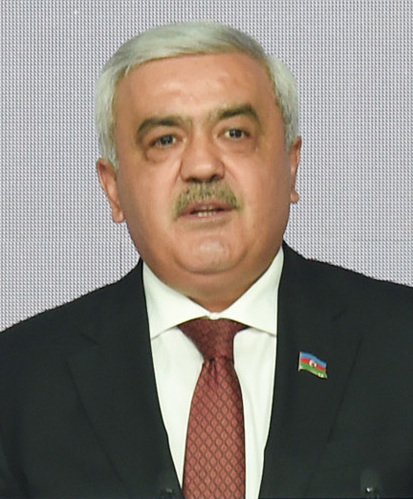
- Born: 3 April 1965 (age 60); Nakhichevan, Nakhichevan ASSR, Azerbaijan SSR, USSR
- Citizenship: Azerbaijan
- Occupation: Businessman
- Known for: Being president of AFFA

Rovnag Ibrahim oghlu Abdullayev (Azerbaijani: Rövnəq İbrahim oğlu Abdullayev; born 3 April 1965 in Nakhchivan, Azerbaijan) is an Azerbaijani politician who was the longstanding CEO of SOCAR, Azerbaijan's state-owned oil company from 2005 to 2022. During his tenure, SOCAR was widely characterized as corrupt by transparency advocates and anti-corruption specialists. He is deputy economy minister of Azerbaijan.

He has been president of the Association of Football Federations of Azerbaijan since 2008. He is a member of National Assembly of Azerbaijan.

== Career ==
He was born on 4 April 1965, in Nakhchivan. Abdullayev received his degree in Civil Engineering from the Faculty of Industrial and Civil Engineering of Moscow State University of Civil Engineering in 1989.

In 1989, Abdullayev began working for the Neft Dashlari Oil and Gas Production Department of the Caspian Sea Oil & Gas Production Association. He continued to work there as an engineer until his appointment as Head of the Industrial Engineering Division of Construction and Mounting Department, Number Three, of Caspian Sea Oil & Gas Construction Trust. He later acted as their Chief Engineer between 1991 and 1994. Between 1997 and 2003 he was Manager of the Caspian Sea Oil & Gas Construction Trust before moving on to be the director of the Heydar Aliyev Baku Oil Refinery, previously known as Azerneftyanajag, until 2005.

He was Neftchi Baku's president from 2004 to 2008.

== Wealth ==
As the head of SOCAR, Abdullayev earned a modest salary and had no other known sources of official income. However, his family have showcased extensive wealth during his tenure as head of SOCAR. At the age of 25, Abdullayev's 25-year-old son, Rashad, bought a luxury flat in London for $22.4 million through an offshore company. In 2019, Rashad's luxury watch (valued at $1.35 million) was stolen in Ibiza. Rashad has also been spotted wearing a Roger Dubuis Excalibur Quatuor, valued at more than a million dollars. Since the age of 17, Rashad has operated several businesses with links to SOCAR.
