= Sangachal Terminal =

Azerbaijani natural gas and oil plant

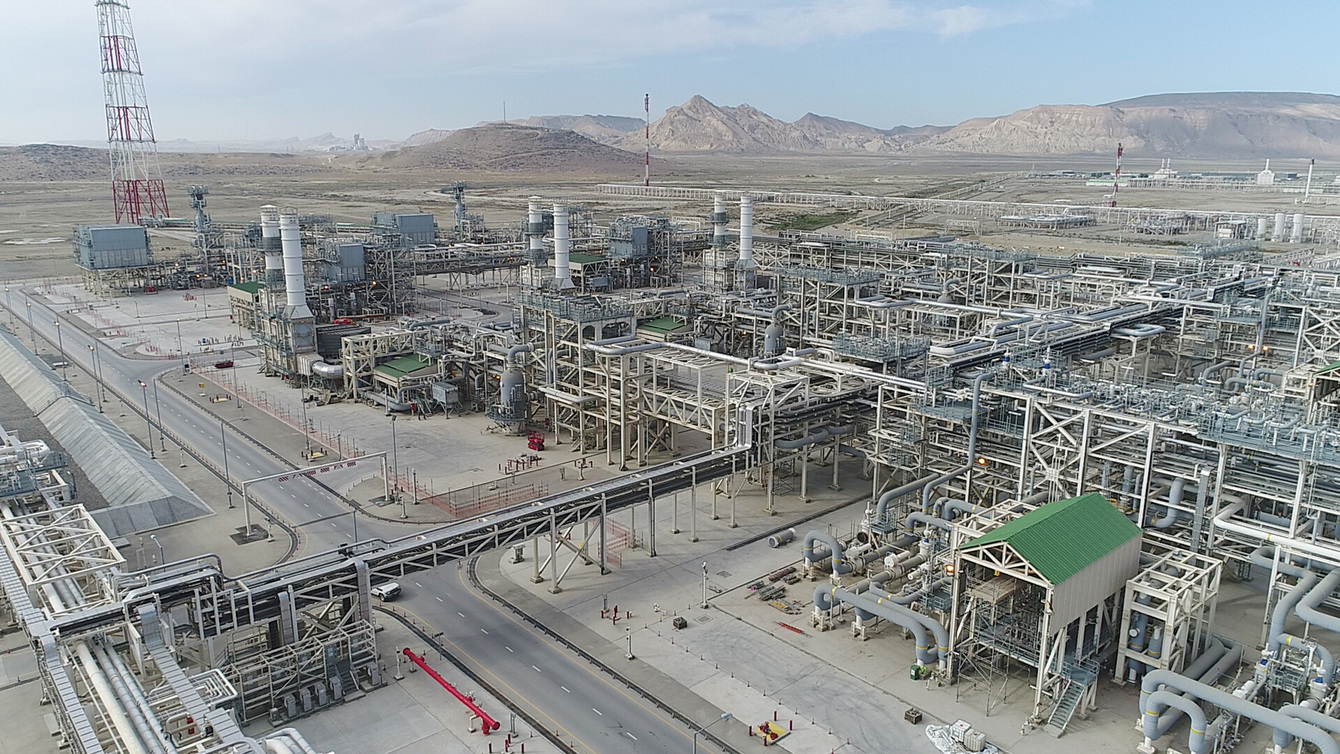
- Sangachal Terminal, — located on the coast of the Caspian Sea 28 mil south of Baku, Azerbaijan
- Interactive map of Sangachal Terminal

Location
- Country: Azerbaijan
- Location: Sanqaçal
- Coordinates: 40.201262°N 49.481270°E

Details
- Opened: 1996
- Operated by: BP
- Owned by: Azerbaijan
- Type of Harbor: Oil and Gas Terminal
- Size: 500 hectares

Statistics
- Annual cargo tonnage: 3 million barrels (480×10^{3} m^{3})

The Sangachal Terminal is an industrial complex consisting of a natural gas processing plant and oil production plant, located on the coast of the Caspian Sea 45 kilometres (28 mi) south of Baku, Azerbaijan.

== History ==
Construction of the terminal began in 1996 with the Early Oil Project, which foresaw the construction of pipelines to Supsa and Novorossiysk. Oil was first exported in October 1997. The terminal has since been expanded to include the ACG Phase 1, Phase 2, Phase 3 oil trains, BTC's main pumping station, and the Shah Deniz gas plant. Facilities at the oil production plant include separators, coalescers, three new crude oil storage tanks, centrifugal pumps, gas turbine power generators, and a central control room.

=== Sangachal Terminal Expansion Program ===
The Sangachal Terminal Expansion Program (STEP) was started in November 2001. The construction included 15,000 cubic metre of concrete, 1,600 units of steel structures, 25,000 metres (82,000 ft) of pipe, 450,000 metres (1,480,000 ft) of cables. Apart from technological works, civil construction included living accommodations for 550 people, cafeteria, movie theater, soccer field, etc. US$1.2-2 billion was spent on the sub-projects realized within the STEP project.

From the Sangachal Terminal four oil and gas pipelines carry crude oil and natural gas to the Black Sea, Turkey and the Mediterranean Sea.

The terminal expansion contract was awarded to the Tekfen-Azfen joint venture which employed nearly 4,000 employees for the project, 75% of which were Azerbaijani citizens. With the finalization of the main part of the project, this number was reduced to 1,720 employees.

== Technical features ==
Sangachal Terminal has a processing capacity of 1.2 million barrels per day (190×10^{3} m^{3}/d) and 1.25 billion cubic feet (35×10^{6} m^{3}) of gas per day (bcfd). The three new crude oil storage tanks added during the STEP have a capacity of 880 thousand barrels (140×10^{3} m^{3}) each. The overall storage capacity at the terminal is 3 million barrels (480×10^{3} m^{3}). As of November 2009, the terminal exports 941.4 thousand barrels per day (149.67×10^{3} m^{3}/d).

The terminal is operated by a BP led consortium and is one of the largest oil and gas facilities in the world. Other partners are from AIOC, Baku-Tbilisi-Ceyhan pipeline, Shah Deniz and South Caucasus Pipeline projects. The terminal receives oil from the Azeri-Chirag-Guneshli field and natural gas from the Shah Deniz gas field.

The oil is exported via the Baku-Tbilisi-Ceyhan pipeline to Turkey's Mediterranean coast and via the Baku-Supsa Pipeline and the Baku-Novorossiysk Pipeline to the Black Sea coast. Sangachal Terminal was mentioned in the United States diplomatic cables leak as one of the US's "critical foreign dependencies".

== See also ==
- Azeri-Chirag-Guneshli
- Natural gas processing
- Natural gas condensate
- Oil production plant
