= Baku–Novorossiysk pipeline =

Azerbaijan-Russia gas transporter

- Location of Baku–Novorossiysk pipeline

Location
- Country: Azerbaijan, Russia
- Direction: East-North-West
- Start: Baku (Sangachal Terminal), Azerbaijan
- To: Novorossiysk, Russia
- Runs alongside: South Caucasus Pipeline

General information
- Type: oil
- Partners: SOCAR, Azerbaijan International Operating Company, Transneft
- Operator: SOCAR, Transneft
- Commissioned: 1997

Technical information
- Length: 1,330 km (830 mi)
- Maximum discharge: 5 million tons per year

The Baku–Novorossiysk pipeline (also known as the Northern Route Export Pipeline and Northern Early Oil Pipeline) is a 1,330-kilometre (830 mi) long oil pipeline that runs from the Sangachal Terminal near Baku to the Novorossiysk terminal on Russia's Black Sea coast. The Azerbaijani section of the pipeline is operated by the State Oil Company of Azerbaijan Republic (SOCAR) and the Russian section is operated by Transneft.

== History ==
A contract on the transportation of Azeri oil via Russia to the Black Sea port of Novorossiysk was signed on 18 February 1996. The trilateral contract was concluded between the Azerbaijan International Operating Company, SOCAR and Transneft. The oil transportation through the pipeline started on 25 October 1997.

On 6 December 2006, after a dispute over natural gas supplies from Russia, Azerbaijan announced that it will stop the exports of Azeri oil through the Baku–Novorossiysk pipeline starting on 1 January 2007. Although SOCAR continued reduced oil supplies through the Baku-Novorossiysk Pipeline, the Azerbaijan International Operating Company stopped using the pipeline on 1 April 2007 and SOCAR became the new operator of the Azerbaijani section. SOCAR temporarily stopped oil supplies through the pipeline in February 2008 due to a pricing disagreement with Transneft. Later that year, the disagreement was resolved and SOCAR resumed pumping oil in line with the terms of the old agreement. In August 2008, the transport of oil along the Baku–Novorossiysk pipeline was significantly increased due to sabotage in Turkey and the conflict in Georgia, forcing a temporary shutdown of the rival Baku-Ceyhan and Baku-Supsa pipelines. By 2013, the Baku–Novorossiysk pipeline remained operational, although the volume of oil pumped through it is relatively low. In 2012, SOCAR exported a total of 25 million tons of oil along all routes. Of this total, only 2 million tons were exported through the Baku–Novorossiysk pipeline. The remaining 20 million and 3 million tons were exported via the Baku–Tbilisi–Ceyhan and Baku–Supsa pipelines, respectively. The crude oil transported through the Baku–Novorossiysk pipeline is produced within the framework of the Early Oil Project, the first stage of the larger Azeri-Chirag-Guneshli (ACG) project.

From March to July 2019, the pipeline closed down for maintenance. In October 2020, according to Azerbaijani sources, the pipeline was reportedly targeted in attacks attributed to Armenian forces. In January 2021, a deal was signed between SOCAR and Transneft to transport more than 1 million tons of oil through the pipeline, but between January and February 15th, 2021, no oil passed through the pipeline, with shipments instead being rerouted via Turkey.

In May 2026, Azerbaijan and Georgia signed an agreement intended to facilitate the resumption of exports through the Baku–Supsa pipeline, an alternative export route from Azerbaijan to the Black Sea. According to the Ministry of Economy of Georgia, the agreement provides for the conclusion of an operating contract covering the Georgian section of the pipeline. The ministry stated that the agreement is expected to enable the resumption of oil transit from Central Asia through Georgia to Europe and to increase revenues to the Georgian state budget.

== Route ==
The Baku–Novorossiysk Pipeline is 1,330 kilometres (830 mi) long, of which 231 kilometres (144 mi) is located in Azerbaijan. In Russia, the pipeline runs through Dagestan. The original route also ran through Chechnya, using the existing Grozny–Baku and Grozny–Novorossiysk pipelines. However, during the Second Chechen War the Chechen section of the pipeline was closed, and Transneft built a Chechnya-bypass loop.

== Technical features ==
The diameter of the pipeline is 530 millimetres (21 in) and the pipeline has an annual capacity of 5 million tons or 105,000 barrels per day. The pipeline has three pump stations, located in Sangachal, Sumgait and Siyazan.

== Volumes exported ==
- 2008: 1.3 million tons
- 2009: 2.55 million tons
- 2017: 1.49 million tons (+15% year-on-year)
- 2018: 1.2 million tons
- 2020: 613,000 tons
- 2021: 1.7 million (+64.5% year-on-year)

== See also ==
- Azeri-Chirag-Guneshli
- Baku–Tbilisi–Ceyhan pipeline
- Baku–Supsa Pipeline
- Petroleum industry in Russia
