= Nakhchivan field =

Offshore oil and gas field in Azerbaijan

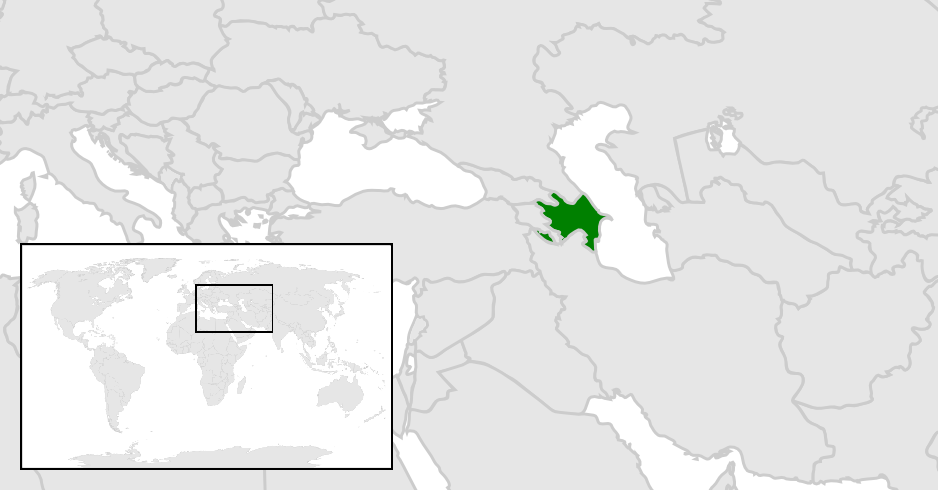
- Country: Azerbaijan
- Offshore/onshore: Offshore
- Operator: RWE Dea
- Partners: RWE Dea, SOCAR

Field history
- Discovery: 1960

Production
- Estimated gas in place: 300×10^{9} m^{3} (11×10^{12} cu ft)

The Nakhchivan field is an offshore oil and gas field in the Caspian Sea, Azerbaijan. It is located 90 kilometres (56 mi) south of Baku, at a depth of 400–600 metres (1,300–2,000 ft).

The Nakhchivan deposit was discovered in 1960. It was prepared for drilling in 1994. In 1997, ExxonMobil and the State Oil Company of Azerbaijan Republic (SOCAR) signed a contract for the exploration of the field; however, this contract was later terminated due to the absence of significant reserves.

On 10 March 2010, it was reported that the German oil company RWE Dea signed a memorandum with SOCAR for developing the field.

According to preliminary government estimates, the Nakhchivan field may contain up to 300 billion cubic meters of natural gas and 40 million tonnes of natural gas condensate.
