= Azeri–Chirag–Gunashli =

Complex of oil fields in the Caspian Sea

- Location within Caspian Sea
- Country: Azerbaijan
- Region: Caspian Sea
- Offshore/onshore: Offshore
- Coordinates: 40°1′4″N 51°15′58″E
- Operator: AIOC
- Partners: SOCAR, BP, MOL Plc., Inpex, ExxonMobil, TPAO, ONGC

Field history
- Discovery: 1985
- Start of production: 1997
- Peak year: 2010

Production
- Current production of oil: 330,000 barrels per day (~1.6×10^{7} t/a)
- Year of current production of oil: 2025
- Current production of gas: 10×10^{6} m^{3}/d (350×10^{6} cu ft/d)
- Peak of production (oil): 823,100 barrels per day (~4.101×10^{7} t/a)
- Estimated oil in place: 5,000 million barrels (~6.8×10^{8} t)

Azeri–Chirag–Gunashli (ACG, Azerbaijani: Azəri-Çıraq-Günəşli), also known as Azeri–Chirag–Deepwater Gunashli, is a complex of offshore oil and gas reservoirs in the Caspian Sea, about 120 kilometres (75 mi) off the coast of Azerbaijan. It consists of the Azeri and Chirag oil fields and the deepwater portion of the Gunashli oil field. The total development area covers 432.4 square kilometres (167.0 sq mi). The contract area contains estimated oil reserves in excess of 5.2 billion barrels.

The development is operated by BP Exploration (Caspian Sea) Limited on behalf of the Azerbaijan International Operating Company (AIOC) consortium. Peak oil production of approximately 823,100 barrels per day (130,860 m^{3}/d) was reached in 2010. Production subsequently declined as the mature fields entered a period of declining output. Production averaged approximately 330,000 barrels per day in 2025. In the first quarter of 2026, production averaged approximately 325,000 barrels per day, with approximately 29 million barrels produced during the quarter.

BP reports that crude oil from ACG is exported through the Baku–Tbilisi–Ceyhan pipeline to the Mediterranean Sea, the Baku-Supsa Pipeline to Supsa in Georgia, and the Baku-Novorossiysk Pipeline to Novorossiysk in Russia. The ACG block also contains non-associated natural gas reserves. In 2024, BP and its co-venturers announced an agreement to advance the exploration, appraisal, development and production of these resources. The first non-associated gas production from ACG began in 2026.

In 2009, IHS CERA (Cambridge Energy Research Associates)ranked ACG third among 20 of the world's largest oil-fields, based on production. Total investment was estimated at US$20 billion at the time. In 2008, oil from the ACG fields accounted for approximately 80% of Azerbaijan's total oil production, including exports and domestic consumption. Contemporary estimates projected that the project could generate up to and was expected to generate up to US$80 billion in profits for Azerbaijan.

The Azeri Central East (ACE) platform, the seventh production platform in the ACG development, began oil production in April 2024.

== History ==
Exploration of the Azeri–Chirag–Gunashli development started in the early 1990s. In January 1991, the Azerbaijani government announced separate international tenders for the exploration rights to the Azeri, Chirag and Gunashli fields. In June 1991, a consortium comprising Amoco, Unocal, BP, Statoil, McDermott and Ramco was formed to develop the Azeri field. Azerbaijan was represented in the consortium by SOCAR. Negotiations were later expanded to include all three fields. After Heydar Aliyev became President of Azerbaijan in 1993, talks with foreign companies were suspended, and Lukoil was invited to join the consortium. Negotiations resumed in 1994. The production sharing agreement (PSA) was signed by the parties on 20 September 1994 to develop the fields for an initial period of 30 years. The day the PSA agreement was signed is celebrated as Oil Workers' Day in Azerbaijan.

At the first stage, the consortium started development drilling at the Chirag field in August 1997. The first oil was produced in November 1997. This development stage was also known as the Early Oil Project (EOP). Initially, produced oil was exported through the Baku–Novorossiysk Pipeline. A contract for transporting oil through Russia to the Black Sea port of Novorossiysk was signed on 18 February 1996. Oil transportation through the pipeline began on 25 October 1997. To diversify export routes, construction of the Baku–Supsa Pipeline was agreed upon in 1996. The pipeline became operational in 1998 and was officially inaugurated in 1999. At the Chirag field, a water injection project was implemented in 1999, and drilling technology was upgraded in 2000.

The second stage of the development consisted of developing the Azeri field. Development of the Azeri field started in 2002. The Central Azeri living quarters arrived in Baku in July 2003, and the drilling modules arrived later that month. The Central Azeri jacket was completed in March 2004. To accommodate additional oil, the Sangachal Terminal was upgraded in March 2003. After the installation of the Central Azeri gas pipeline, the Central Azeri platform was launched in July 2004 and installed offshore by October 2004. Production started in February 2005. The Central Azeri compression and water injection platform topsides were launched in July 2005. The platform began injecting gas in May 2006

The West Azeri drilling modules arrived in Baku in August 2004, and the platform was launched in May 2005. The platform's topsides were installed in September 2005, and production started in January 2006. East Azeri drilling modules and living quarters arrived in Baku in June 2005, and the platform was launched in March 2006. The topside was installed in March 2006, and production began in October 2006.

The Deepwater Gunashli pre-drilling program started in December 2005. Drilling modules and living quarters arrived in Baku in June 2006. The platform became operational in April 2008.

On September 14, 2017, the Azerbaijan Government and the State Oil Company of the Republic of Azerbaijan (SOCAR), together with BP, Chevron, INPEX, Statoil, ExxonMobil, Turkish Petroleum (TP), ITOCHU and ONGC Videsh, signed an agreement to extend the PSA for ACG fields until 2049.

On April 19, 2019, SOCAR President Rovnag Abdullayev and BP’s regional president for Azerbaijan, Georgia, and Turkey, Garry Johns signed a contract worth US$6 billion. The final investment decision for the Azeri Central East (ACE) platform, to be built on the Azeri–Chirag–Gunashli (ACG) block, was made during a signing ceremony. Construction was scheduled to begin in 2019. Completion was planned for mid-2022.

The ACE platform was installed offshore in 2023 and began oil production on 16 April 2024. It was the seventh production platform installed as part of the ACG development.

In the first quarter of 2024, production was 339,000 barrels per day (53,900 m^{3}/d), approximately one-third of its peak level. The ACE platform was brought on stream as production from the mature ACG fields continued to decline.

In 2024, BP and its ACG co-venturers also agreed to advance the exploration, appraisal, development and production of non-associated natural gas resources within the ACG contract area. Commercial production of non-associated gas began in June 2026.

== Ownership ==
The founding consortium formed to develop the Azeri–Chirag–Gunashli project initially included BP, Amoco, Unocal, Statoil, McDermott, Turkish Petroleum, and Ramco Energy.

Lukoil sold its share in the project to Inpex in 2003 for US$1.354 billion.

On 23 November 2009, Devon Energy announced that it would sell its share in ACG. On 29 March 2013, Hess sold its stake to ONGC for US$1 billion.

In April 2020, Chevron sold its entire share in Azeri–Chirag–Gunashli, including its interests in the Western Export Route Pipeline and the Baku-Tbilisi-Ceyhan pipeline, to MOL Hungarian Oil and Gas PLC.

In 2018, and again in May 2020, ExxonMobil unsuccessfully attempted to sell its stake in Azeri–Chirag–Gunashli.

In 2023, Norway's Equinor divested all of its assets in Azerbaijan, including its stakes in the Azeri–Chirag–Gunashli development and the Baku-Tbilisi-Ceyhan pipeline. Equinor reported a transaction-related loss of between US$300 million and US$400 million, which was recognised in 2024. Of Equinor's original 7.27% interest in ACG, 6.655% was transferred to SOCAR, the State Oil Company of the Republic of Azerbaijan, and 0.615% to ONGC Videsh.

On 3 August 2026, SOCAR acquired ITOCHU Corporation's 3.65% participating interest in the ACG project. Following the transaction, SOCAR's participating interest increased to 35.30%.

As of August 2026, the participating interests in the Azeri–Chirag–Gunashli development are SOCAR (35.30%), BP (30.37%), MOL (9.57%), INPEX (9.31%), ExxonMobil (6.79%), TPAO (5.73%) and ONGC Videsh (2.92%). BP is the operator of the AIOC consortium.

== Production ==
Azeri-Chirag-Gunashli complex projected production profile, with contributions of individual reservoirs delineated, per the U.S. Energy Information Administration and BP.

With three stages completed and seven platforms in operation, total production from Azeri–Chirag–Gunashli was more than 1 million barrels (160,000 m^{3}) per day in 2009. During the first three quarters of 2009, over 224 million barrels (35.6×10^{6} m^{3}) of oil were produced from the Chirag, Central Azeri, West Azeri, East Azeri and Deep Water Gunashli platforms. According to BP's report, Chirag had 19 wells in operation (13 of which were oil producers and six were water injectors) with an overall production of 105,300 bbl/d (16,740 m^{3}/d). Central Azeri (CA) had 18 wells (13 of which were oil producers and five were gas injectors), with a production of 185,800 bbl/d (29,540 m^{3}/d). West Azeri (WA) had 18 wells in operation (14 of which were oil producers and four were water injectors), with a production of 275,200 barrels per day (43,750 m^{3}/d). East Azeri (EA) had 13 wells in operation (nine of which were oil producers and four were water injectors), with an overall production of 139,400 barrels per day (22,160 m^{3}/d) during the first three quarters of 2009. Deep Water Gunashli (DWG) had 17 wells (nine oil producers and eight water injectors) in operation, with a production of 116,400 barrels per day (18,510 m^{3}/d) of oil.

Oil depletion rates for each of the Azeri–Chirag–Gunashli reservoirs are expected to differ over time, with aggregate output from the complex declining substantially after 2018.

Azerbaijan also receives approximately 10–11 million cubic metres (350–390 million cubic feet) of casing head gas per day extracted from the ACG block. The gas is supplied by BP free of charge. Azerbaijan received over 1 billion cubic metres of gas from these fields in the first quarter of 2009. Current recovery amounts to nearly 27 million cubic metres of casing head gas per day. Some of the gas is routed to Azerbaijan's national gas transportation system, while some is used as fuel on the platforms and some is reinjected into the reservoirs to maintain pressure.

Casing head gas from platforms in the central, western and eastern parts of the Azeri field is supplied to the Sangachal Terminal via a 28-inch subsea gas pipeline and then to the distribution system of Azerigaz CJSC for use on the local market. A portion of the casing head gas extracted at the Chirag platform is directed to SOCAR's compressor station at Oil Rocks through a 16-inch subsea gas pipeline. The rest of the gas from the Azeri–Chirag–Gunashli platforms is pumped through an interfield subsea gas pipeline to a platform for repeated pumping into the reservoir to support reservoir pressure. As of September 2009, 164.2 million tonnes of oil and 37 billion cubic metres of associated gas had been produced, and 80.3 million cubic metres of water and 13 billion cubic metres of gas had been injected into the reservoirs since the beginning of production at the ACG fields in 1997.

The total production rate of the ACG complex as of the first quarter of 2024 was 339,000 barrels per day (53,900 m^{3}/d), having substantially declined from its peak output of 835,000 barrels per day (132,800 m^{3}/d) in 2010.

In 2024, the State Oil Fund of Republic of Azerbaijan (SOFAZ) reported revenue of US$5.725 billion from the sale of oil from the Azeri-Chirag-Gunashli (ACG) field.

In the period from January to March 2025, a total of 30 million barrels of oil were produced from the Azeri-Chirag-Gunashli (ACG) field.

== Routes of transportation ==
The oil from the ACG complex was pumped to the Sangachal Terminal, south of Baku, and from there routed to foreign markets via the Baku-Supsa pipeline, Baku–Novorossiysk pipeline and Baku–Tbilisi–Ceyhan pipeline. An interactive map shows the current export routes.

== See also ==
- Baku–Tbilisi–Ceyhan pipeline
- Baku-Supsa pipeline
- Baku–Novorossiysk pipeline
- Shah Deniz gas field
- South Caucasus Pipeline
- Sangachal Terminal
