= Baku–Supsa Pipeline =

Oil pipeline from Azerbaijan to Turkey

- Location of Baku–Supsa Pipeline

Location
- Country: Azerbaijan, Georgia, Turkey
- Direction: east–west
- Start: Baku (Sangachal Terminal), Azerbaijan
- Passes through: Tbilisi
- To: Supsa terminal in Georgia
- Runs alongside: Baku–Tbilisi–Ceyhan pipeline (partly)

General information
- Type: oil
- Partners: SOCAR, Azerbaijan International Operating Company, GIOC
- Operator: BP
- Commissioned: 1999

Technical information
- Length: 833 km (518 mi)
- Maximum discharge: 145,000 barrels (23,100 m^{3}) per day

The Baku–Supsa Pipeline (also known as the Western Route Export Pipeline and Western Early Oil Pipeline) is an 833-kilometre (518 mi) long crude-oil export pipeline running from the Sangachal Terminal near Baku to the Supsa terminal in Georgia. It transports oil produced from the Azeri-Chirag-Gunashli field. The pipeline and the Supsa terminal have been operated by SOCAR Midstream Operations since 8 June 2026, when operational responsibility was transferred from BP following the expiration of BP's operating agreement.

== History ==
Preparations for the pipeline's construction started in 1994. On 8 March 1996, President of Azerbaijan Heydar Aliyev and President of Georgia Eduard Shevardnadze agreed on the establishment of the Baku–Supsa pipeline. A trilateral contract was signed between Azerbaijan International Operating Company, SOCAR and the Government of Georgia. In 1996, the main project contract was awarded to Kværner. The pipeline was completed in 1998. On 17 April 1999, the inauguration ceremony of the Supsa Oil Terminal took place. The total cost of constructing the pipeline and terminal was US$556 million.

Oil transportation through the pipeline was stopped on 21 October 2006 after abnormalities were revealed during an inspection of the pipeline. The large-scale repair and replacement work included the replacement and rerouting of pipeline sections near Zestaponi in Georgia and at the Kura River crossing in Azerbaijan. Several defects in sections dating from the Soviet times were also repaired. In total, the repair works cost US$53 million. Oil shipments restarted in June 2008.

After a major explosion and fire closed the Baku–Tbilisi–Ceyhan pipeline on 6 August 2008, the Baku–Supsa Pipeline was used to reroute Azerbaijani oil deliveries. On 12 August 2008, BP temporarily closed the pipeline for safety reasons because of the South Ossetia conflict. Russian aircraft reportedly bombed the pipeline on August 10 and 12 2008. In the summer of 2012, the pipeline was shut down for a month for maintenance.

In July 2015, Russian troops involved in demarcating the de facto border of South Ossetia moved the boundary line forward near the village of Orchosani, taking control of a short length of the pipeline. Analysts suggested that this was a Russian reaction intended to discourage Georgia from making further moves towards joining NATO. While conceding that the pipeline might need to be diverted in the future, a SOCAR vice president reportedly denied any short-term need for such concern.

In June 2022, regular oil transportation through the pipeline was suspended amid increased security and shipping risks in the Black Sea following Russia's invasion of Ukraine. The pipeline was not permanently mothballed, however, and limited shipments were subsequently resumed. In 2023, approximately 150,000 tonnes of oil were transported through the pipeline, while reported estimates for 2024 vary by source. BP rerouted oil from the pipeline to the much larger Baku–Tbilisi–Ceyhan pipeline due to security concerns.

In 2024, Azerbaijan and Kazakhstan also discussed the possibility of transporting up to 5 million tonnes of Kazakh oil annually through the Baku–Supsa pipeline as part of efforts to diversify Kazakhstan's oil-export routes. The proposal had not, however, resulted in such volumes being transported through the pipeline.

In May 2026, the Georgian Oil and Gas Corporation and SOCAR reached a new operating agreement concerning the Georgian section of the pipeline, with the agreement intended to support the restoration of operations. On 8 June 2026, SOCAR Midstream Operations took over operational responsibility for the Baku–Supsa pipeline and the Supsa terminal from BP following the expiration of BP's operating agreement.

== Current status ==
As of June 2026, SOCAR Midstream Operations is responsible for operating the Baku–Supsa pipeline and Supsa terminal. The transfer of operatorship represents a change from the pipeline's previous operation under BP. The pipeline remains available for oil transportation, and the new operating agreement is intended to support the restoration of regular operations.

Recent throughput has been substantially below the pipeline's designed capacity. Limited volumes were transported in 2023 and 2024, following the suspension of regular transportation in 2022. The pipeline's future utilisation may include Azerbaijani crude as well as potential transit of Kazakh crude oil.

== Technical features ==
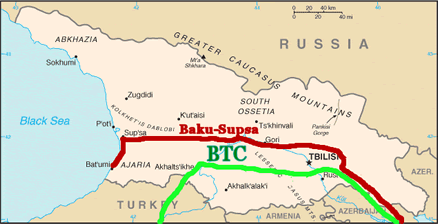
Detailed route map of Baku-Supsa and Baku-Tbilisi-Ceyhan pipelines through Georgia's militarily-contested regions.

Essentially, the Baku–Supsa pipeline is a refurbished Soviet-era pipeline with several newly built sections. It is approximately 837 km long and has a diameter of about 530 mm. It has six pumping stations and two pressure reduction stations in western Georgia. The four storage tanks at the Supsa terminal have a total capacity of 160,000 cubic metres.

The pipeline's designed capacity is approximately 7.5 million tonnes of oil per year. Earlier sources gave a capacity of 7.2 million tonnes per year, equivalent to approximately 145,000 barrels per day (23,100 m^{3}/d). Proposed upgrades have been described as increasing capacity to between 300,000 to 600,000 barrels per day (48,000 to 95,000 m^{3}/d).

From 1999 to 2016, 76.3 million tons of oil were transported through the pipeline. In 2021, it carried 4.2 million tons. Throughput subsequently fell sharply following the suspension of regular transportation in 2022.

The cost of transporting one ton of oil through the pipeline was $3.14 in 2016, of which Georgia received $1.20 and Azerbaijan received the rest.

== See also ==
- Baku–Tbilisi–Ceyhan pipeline
- Baku–Novorossiysk Pipeline
- Energy in Georgia (country)
