= Production sharing agreement =

Type of contract

Production sharing agreements (PSAs) or production sharing contracts (PSCs) are a common type of contract signed between a government and a resource extraction company (or group of companies) concerning how much of the resource (usually oil) extracted from the country each will receive.

== Description ==
Production sharing agreements were first used in Bolivia in the early 1950s, although their first implementation similar to today's was in Indonesia in the 1960s. Today they are often used in the Middle East and Central Asia, overall 40 countries worldwide.

In production sharing agreements the country's government awards the execution of exploration and production activities to an oil company. The oil company bears the mineral and financial risk of the initiative and explores, develops and ultimately produces the field as required. When successful, the company is permitted to use the money from produced oil to recover capital and operational expenditures, known as "cost oil". The remaining money is known as "profit oil", and is split between the government and the company. In most of the production sharing agreements, changes in international oil prices or production rate affect the company's share of production.

Production sharing agreements can be beneficial to governments of countries that lack the expertise and/or capital to develop their resources and wish to attract foreign companies to do so. They can be very profitable agreements for the oil companies involved, but often involve considerable risk.

== Cost stop and excess oil ==
The amount of costs recoverable is often limited to an amount called "cost stop". If the costs incurred by the company are bigger than the cost stop, the company is entitled to recover only the costs limited to the cost stop. When the costs incurred are smaller than the cost stop, the difference between the costs and the cost stop is called "excess oil". Usually, but not necessarily, the excess oil is shared between the government and the company according to the same rules of the profit oil. If the recoverable costs are higher than the cost stop the contract is defined as saturated.

The cost stop gives to the government the guarantee to recover part of the production (as long the price of the crude produced is higher than the cost stop), especially during the first years of production when the costs are higher. Since the beginning of the 80s all major contracts include invariable a clause of cost stop. The cost stop can be a fixed amount, but in most case it is a percentage of the cost of the crude.

== Risk sharing contracts ==
First implemented in Malaysia, the risk sharing contracts (RSC) departs from the production sharing contract (PSC) first introduced in 1976 and most recently revised last year as the enhanced oil recovery (EOR) PSC which ramps up recovery rate from 26% to 40%. As a performance-based agreement, it is developed in Malaysia for the Malaysian people and private partners to both benefit from successfully and viably monetizing these marginal fields. At the Center for Energy Sustainability and Economics' Production Optimisation Week Asia Forum in Malaysia on 27 July 2011, Finance Deputy Minister YB. Sen. Dato' Ir. Donald Lim Siang Chai expounded that the trail-blazing RSC calls for optimal delivery of production targets and allows for knowledge transfer from joint ventures between foreign and local players in the development of Malaysia's 106 marginal fields, which cumulatively contain 580 million barrels of oil equivalent (BOE) in today's high-demand, low-resource energy market.

=== Framework for Marginal Fields Risk Service Contracts ===
Performance-based agreements like the Berantai RSC have a tighter focus on production and recovery rates as compared with production sharing contracts favoured by oil majors. This emphasis on optimising production capacities in marginal fields can be extended to contracts governing the recovery of main oilfields in an industry of rapidly depleting resources. Currently, Petronas’ recovery factor is about 26% for its main oilfields, which can be further improved with optimised production techniques and knowledge exchange.

- Marginal Fields are located within a producing block and its main product is oil;
- The IOC provides technical, financial, managerial or commercial services to the state from exploration through production;
- Risk service contracts – the IOC bears all the exploration costs;
- Petronas retains ownership of oil;
- The Internal Rate of Return (IRR) is estimated at between 7% – 20% subject to terms and conditions – more attractive ROI than a PSC regime;
- Contractor receives fee payment commencing from first production and throughout the duration of the contract
- Fee is subject to taxes – but to incentivise investment in marginal fields Malaysia has reduced tax for from 38% to 25%, to improve commercial viability of investment projects;

According to think tank Arc Media Global, while efficient, the RSC is essentially a contract that significantly increases an operator's risks of exposure.

== See also ==
- Oil and gas agreements
