= Baku–Tbilisi–Ceyhan pipeline =

Oil pipeline

- Location of Baku–Tbilisi–Ceyhan pipeline

Location
- Country: Azerbaijan, Georgia, Turkey
- Direction: east–south-west
- Start: Baku (Sangachal Terminal), Azerbaijan
- Passes through: Tbilisi Georgia; Erzurum Turkey; Sarız Turkey
- To: Ceyhan, Turkey
- Runs alongside: South Caucasus Pipeline

General information
- Type: oil
- Partners: BP; SOCAR; Chevron; Statoil; GIOC; TPAO; Eni; TotalEnergies; Itochu; Inpex; ConocoPhillips; Hess Corporation
- Operator: BP
- Commissioned: 2006; 20 years ago

Technical information
- Length: 1,768 km (1,099 mi)
- Maximum discharge: 1 million barrels (160,000 m^{3}) of oil per day

The Baku–Tbilisi–Ceyhan (BTC) pipeline is a 1,768 kilometres (1,099 mi) long crude oil pipeline from the Azeri–Chirag–Gunashli oil field in the Caspian Sea to the Mediterranean Sea. It connects Baku, the capital of Azerbaijan and Ceyhan, a port on the south-eastern Mediterranean coast of Turkey, via Tbilisi, the capital of Georgia. It is the second-longest oil pipeline in the former Soviet Union, after the Russian Druzhba pipeline. The first oil that was pumped from the Baku end of the pipeline reached Ceyhan on 28 May 2006.

== History ==
=== Planning ===
The Caspian Sea lies above one of the world's largest collections of oil and gas fields. As the sea is landlocked, transporting oil to Western markets is complicated. During Soviet times, all transportation routes from the Caspian region were through Russia. The collapse of the Soviet Union inspired a search for new routes. Russia first insisted that the new pipeline should pass through its territory, then declined to participate.

In the spring of 1992, the Turkish Prime Minister Süleyman Demirel proposed to Central Asian countries including Azerbaijan that the pipeline run through Turkey. The first document on the construction of the Baku–Tbilisi–Ceyhan pipeline was signed between Azerbaijan and Turkey on 9 March 1993 in Ankara. The Turkish route meant a pipeline from Azerbaijan would run through Georgia or Armenia, but the route through Armenia was politically impossible due to the unresolved war between Armenia and Azerbaijan over the status of Nagorno-Karabakh. This left the circuitous Azerbaijan-Georgia-Turkey route, longer and more expensive to build than the other option.

The project gained momentum following the Ankara Declaration, adopted on 29 October 1998 by President of Azerbaijan Heydar Aliyev, President of Georgia Eduard Shevardnadze, President of Kazakhstan Nursultan Nazarbayev, President of Turkey Süleyman Demirel, and President of Uzbekistan Islam Karimov. The declaration was witnessed by the United States Secretary of Energy Bill Richardson, who expressed strong support for the pipeline. The intergovernmental agreement in support of the pipeline was signed by Azerbaijan, Georgia, and Turkey on 18 November 1999, during a meeting of the Organization for Security and Cooperation in Europe (OSCE) in Istanbul, Turkey.

On 1 July 2026, Azerbaijan's state-owned energy company SOCAR assumed operatorship of the Baku–Tbilisi–Ceyhan (BTC) oil pipeline from BP through its subsidiary, SOCAR Midstream Operations (SMO). The transfer covers all three sections of the 1,768-kilometre pipeline, which passes through Azerbaijan, Georgia, and Türkiye.

=== Construction ===
The Baku-Tbilisi-Ceyhan Pipeline Company (BTC Co.) was established in London on 1 August 2002. The ceremony launching construction of the pipeline was held on 18 September 2002. Construction began in April 2003 and was completed in 2005. The Azerbaijan section was built by Consolidated Contractors International of Greece, and Georgia's section was constructed by a joint venture of France's Spie Capag and UK Petrofac International. The Turkish section was built by BOTAŞ Petroleum Pipeline Corporation. Bechtel was the main contractor for engineering, procurement and construction. Detailed design and engineering contractor was ILF Consulting Engineers for the Turkish section of the pipeline, which is approximately over 1000 km.

=== Inauguration ===
On 25 May 2005, the pipeline was inaugurated at the Sangachal Terminal by President Ilham Aliyev of Azerbaijan, President Mikhail Saakashvili of Georgia and President Ahmet Sezer of Turkey, joined by President Nursultan Nazarbayev of Kazakhstan and United States Secretary of Energy Samuel Bodman. The inauguration of the Georgian section was hosted by President Mikheil Saakashvili at the pumping station near Gardabani on 12 October 2005. The inauguration ceremony at Ceyhan terminal was held on 13 July 2006.

The pipeline was gradually filled with 10 million barrels of oil flowing from Baku and reaching Ceyhan on 28 May 2006. The first oil was loaded at the Ceyhan Marine Terminal (Haydar Aliyev Terminal) onto a tanker named British Hawthorn. The tanker sailed on 4 June 2006 with about 600,000 barrels (95,000 m^{3}) of crude oil.

== Description ==
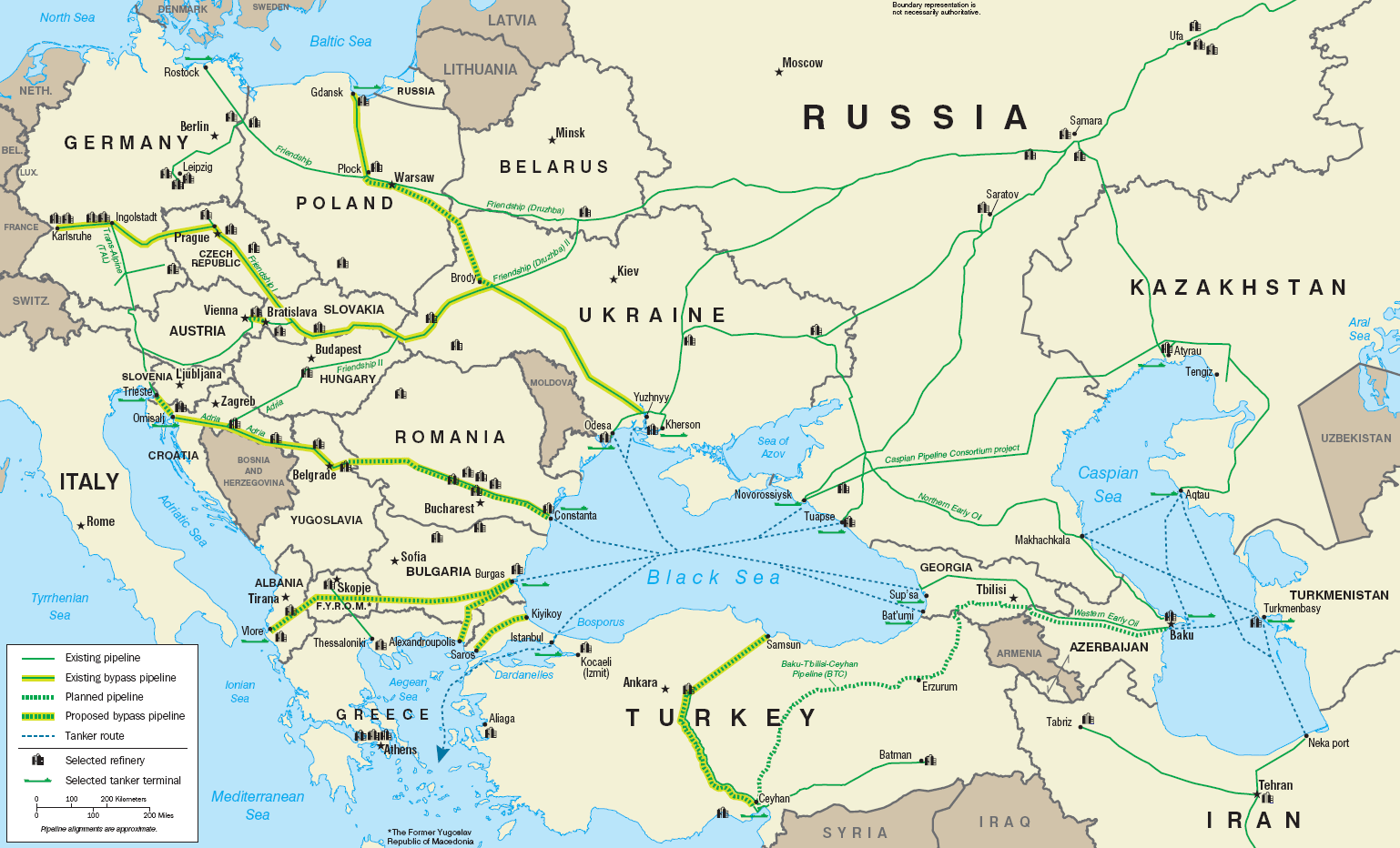
Petroleum pipelines to Europe

=== Route ===
The 1,768 kilometres (1,099 mi) long pipeline starts at the Sangachal Terminal near Baku in Azerbaijan, crosses Georgia and terminates at the Ceyhan Marine Terminal (Haydar Aliyev Terminal) on the south-eastern Mediterranean coast of Turkey. 443 kilometres (275 mi) of the pipeline lie in Azerbaijan, 249 kilometres (155 mi) in Georgia and 1,076 kilometres (669 mi) in Turkey. It crosses several mountain ranges at altitudes to 2,830 metres (9,300 ft). It also traverses 3,000 roads, railways, and utility lines—both overground and underground—and 1,500 watercourses up to 500 metres (1,600 ft) wide (in the case of the Ceyhan River in Turkey). The pipeline occupies a corridor eight meters wide, and is buried to a depth of at least one meter. The pipeline runs parallel to the South Caucasus Gas Pipeline, which transports natural gas from the Sangachal Terminal to Erzurum in Turkey.

=== Technical features ===
The pipeline has a projected lifespan of 40 years, and at normal capacity it transports 1 million barrels per day (160×10^{3} m^{3}/d). It needs 10 million barrels (1.6×10^{6} m^{3}) of oil to fill the pipeline. Oil flows at 2 metres (6.6 ft) per second. There are eight pump stations, two in Azerbaijan, two in Georgia, four in Turkey. The project includes also the Ceyhan Marine Terminal (officially the Haydar Aliyev Terminal, named after the Azerbaijani late president Heydar Aliyev), three intermediate pigging stations, one pressure reduction station, and 101 small block valves. It was constructed from 150,000 individual joints of line pipe, each measuring 12 metres (39 ft) in length. This corresponds to a total weight of 655,000 short tons (594,000 t). The pipeline is 1,070 millimetres (42 in) diameter for most of its length, narrowing to 865 millimetres (34.1 in) diameter as it nears Ceyhan.

=== Cost and financing ===
The pipeline cost US$3.9 billion. The construction created 10,000 short-term jobs and the operation of the pipeline requires 1,000 long-term employees across a 40-year period. 70% of the costs are funded by third parties, including the World Bank's International Finance Corporation, the European Bank for Reconstruction and Development, export credit agencies of seven countries and a syndicate of 15 commercial banks.

=== Source of supply ===
The pipeline is supplied by oil from Azerbaijan's Azeri-Chirag-Guneshli oil field in the Caspian Sea via the Sangachal Terminal. This pipeline may also transport oil from Kazakhstan's Kashagan oil field and other oil fields in Central Asia. The government of Kazakhstan announced that it would build a trans-Caspian oil pipeline from the Kazakhstani port of Aktau to Baku, but because of the opposition from both Russia and Iran it started to transport oil to the BTC pipeline by tankers across the Caspian Sea. Not only Kazakh, but also Turkmen oil have transported via Baku–Tbilisi–Ceyhan pipeline. Thus, in 2015, 5,2 million Kazakh and Turkmen oil were transported via this pipeline to the world markets.

=== Possible transhipment via Israel ===
It has been proposed that oil from the pipeline be transported to eastern Asia via the Israeli oil terminals at Ashkelon and Eilat, the overland trans-Israel sector being bridged by the Trans-Israel pipeline owned by the Eilat Ashkelon Pipeline Company (EAPC).

== Ownership ==
The pipeline is owned and operated by BTC Co, a consortium of 11 energy companies. The consortium is managed by BP. Shareholders are:

- BP (United Kingdom): 30.1%
- State Oil Company of Azerbaijan (SOCAR) (Azerbaijan): 25.00%
- MOL Group (Hungary): 8.90%
- Equinor (Norway): 8.71%
- Türkiye Petrolleri Anonim Ortaklığı (TPAO) (Turkey): 6.53%
- Eni (Italy): 5.00%
- TotalEnergies (France): 5.00%
- Itochu (Japan): 3.40%
- Inpex (Japan): 2.50%
- ExxonMobil (USA): 2.50%
- ONGC Videsh (India) 2.36%

== Archaeology ==
Azerbaijani, Georgian, Turkish, British, and American archaeologists began archaeological surveys in 2000, sponsored by BP. Several cultural artifacts were uncovered during the construction, resulting in a coordinated research of the archaeological sites such as Dashbulaq, Hasansu, Zayamchai, and Tovuzchai in Azerbaijan; Klde, Orchosani, and Saphar-Kharaba in Georgia; and Güllüdere, Yüceören, and Ziyaretsuyu in Turkey.

== Controversies ==
=== Politics ===
Even before its completion, the pipeline was having an effect on the world's petroleum politics. The South Caucasus, previously seen as Russia's backyard, is now a region of great strategic significance. The U.S. and other Western nations have become much more involved in the affairs of the three nations through which oil will flow. The countries have been trying to use the involvement as a counterbalance to Russian and Iranian economic and military dominance in the region. Russian specialists claim that the pipeline will weaken the Russian influence in the Caucasus. The Russian Parliament Foreign Affairs Committee chairman Konstantin Kosachev stated that the United States and other Western countries are planning to station soldiers in the Caucasus on the pretext of instability in regions through which the pipeline passes.

The project has been criticised due to bypassing and regional isolation of Armenia, as well as for human rights and safety concerns. Ilham Aliev, the president of Azerbaijan, which is in conflict with Armenia, was cited as saying, "If we succeed with this project, the Armenians will end in complete isolation, which would create an additional problem for their future, their already bleak future".

The project also constitutes an important leg of the East–West energy corridor, gaining Turkey greater geopolitical importance. The pipeline supports Georgia's independence from Russian influence. Former President Eduard Shevardnadze, one of the architects and initiators of the project, saw construction through Georgia as a guarantee for the country's future economic and political security and stability. President Mikhail Saakashvili shares this view. "All strategic contracts in Georgia, especially the contract for the Caspian pipeline are a matter of survival for the Georgian state," he told reporters on 26 November 2003.

=== Economics ===
Although some have touted the pipeline as easing the dependence of the United States and other Western nations on oil from the Middle East, it supplies only 1% of global demand during its first stage.

The pipeline diversifies the global oil supply and so insures, to an extent, against a failure in supply elsewhere. Critics of the pipeline—particularly Russia—are skeptical about its economic prospects.

Construction of the pipeline has contributed to the economies of the host countries. In the first half of 2007, a year after the launch of the pipeline as the main export route for Azerbaijani oil, the real GDP growth of Azerbaijan hit a record of 35%. Substantial transit fees accrue to Georgia and Turkey. For Georgia, the transit fees are expected to produce an average of US$62.5 million per year. Turkey is expected to receive approximately US$200 million in transit fees per year in the initial years of operation, with the possibility that the fees increase to US$290 million per year from year 17 to year 40. Turkey also benefits from an increase of commerce in the port of Ceyhan and other parts of eastern Anatolia, the region which had experienced significant decrease in economic activities since the Gulf War in 1991. The reduction of oil tanker traffic on the Bosphorus will contribute to greater security for Istanbul.

To counter concerns that oil money would be siphoned off by corrupt officials, Azerbaijan set up a state oil fund (SOFAZ), mandated with using revenue from natural resources to benefit future generations, bolster support from key international lenders, and improve transparency and accountability. Azerbaijan became the first oil-producing country to join EITI, the British-led Extractive Industries Transparency Initiative.

=== Security ===
Concerns have been addressed about the security of the pipeline. It bypasses Armenia, which has an unresolved conflict with Azerbaijan over the status of Nagorno-Karabakh, crosses through Georgia, which has two unresolved separatist conflicts, and goes through the edges of the Kurdish region of Turkey, which has seen a prolonged and bitter conflict with Kurdish separatists. It will require constant guarding to prevent sabotage, though the fact that almost all of the pipeline is buried will make it harder to attack. Georgia formed a special purpose battalion that would guard the pipeline while the US watched over the area with unmanned aerial vehicles (UAVs).

On 5 August 2008, a major explosion and fire in Refahiye (eastern Turkey Erzincan Province) closed the pipeline. The Kurdistan Workers Party (PKK) claimed responsibility. The pipeline was restarted on 25 August 2008.

There is circumstantial evidence that it was instead a sophisticated cyber attack on the line's control and safety systems that led to increased pressure and an explosion. The attack might have been related to the Russo-Georgian War, which started two days later. However, the cyber attack theory has been largely criticized due to a lack of evidence, and was publicly debunked by ICS cyber security expert Robert M. Lee.

In September 2015, unrecognized Nagorno-Karabakh's defense minister, Levon Mnatsakanyan, was cited as saying: "This is a very serious financial resource for Azerbaijan and we need to deprive them of these means". In October 2020, Azerbaijan claimed that pipeline was targeted during the Second Nagorno-Karabakh War. Armenia rejected the accusations.

Contamination of oil in the pipeline by organic chlorides was discovered in July 2025, which affected roughly 200,000 tonnes of oil and led to massive losses in Azeri crude oil markets. The investigation of the incident led to the discovery of Azerbaijani oil tankers being used to transport Russian oil to Turkey, circumventing European Union sanctions.

=== Environment ===
Critics of the pipeline have pointed out it should be properly earthquake engineered because it travels through three active faults in Azerbaijan, four in Georgia and seven in Turkey. Environmental activists fiercely opposed the crossing of the watershed of the Borjomi-Kharagauli National Park in Georgia, an area known for mineral water springs and natural beauty, although the pipeline itself does not enter the park. The construction of the pipeline left a highly visible scar across the landscape. The Oxford-based "Baku Ceyhan Campaign" stated that "public money should not be used to subsidize social and environmental problems, purely in the interests of the private sector, but must be conditional on a positive contribution to the economic and social development of people in the region." As Borjomi mineral water is a major export commodity of Georgia, any oil spills there would have a catastrophic effect on the economy.

The field joint coating of the pipeline has been controversial over the claim that SPC 2888, the sealant used, was not properly tested. BP and its contractors interrupted work until the problem was eliminated.

The pipeline eliminates 350 tanker cargoes per year through the sensitive congested Bosphorus and Dardanelles.

=== Human rights ===
Human rights activists criticized Western governments for the pipeline, due to reported human and civil rights abuses by the Aliyev regime in Azerbaijan. A Czech documentary film Zdroj (Source) underscores these human rights abuses, such as eminent domain violations in appropriating land for the pipeline's route, and criticism of the government leading to arrest.

== In fiction ==
The pipeline was a central plot point in the James Bond film The World Is Not Enough (1999). One of the central characters, Elektra King, is responsible for the construction of an oil pipeline through the Caucasus, from the Caspian Sea to the Mediterranean coast of Turkey. Named the "King pipeline" in the film, it is a thinly disguised version of the BTC.

== See also ==
- Baku–Novorossiysk pipeline
- Baku–Supsa Pipeline
- Dutch disease
- Economy of Azerbaijan
- Foreign relations of Azerbaijan
- Foreign relations of Georgia (country)
- Foreign relations of Turkey
- Geostrategy in Central Asia
- Nabucco pipeline
- Energy in Georgia (country)
- South Caucasus Pipeline
- Trans-Anatolian gas pipeline

== Notes ==
- The Encyclopaedia of the successful land acquisition processes of the Baku-Tbilisi-Ceyhan and South Caucasus Pipelines projects in Azerbaijan
