= Jim Bridenstine =

American politician (born 1975)

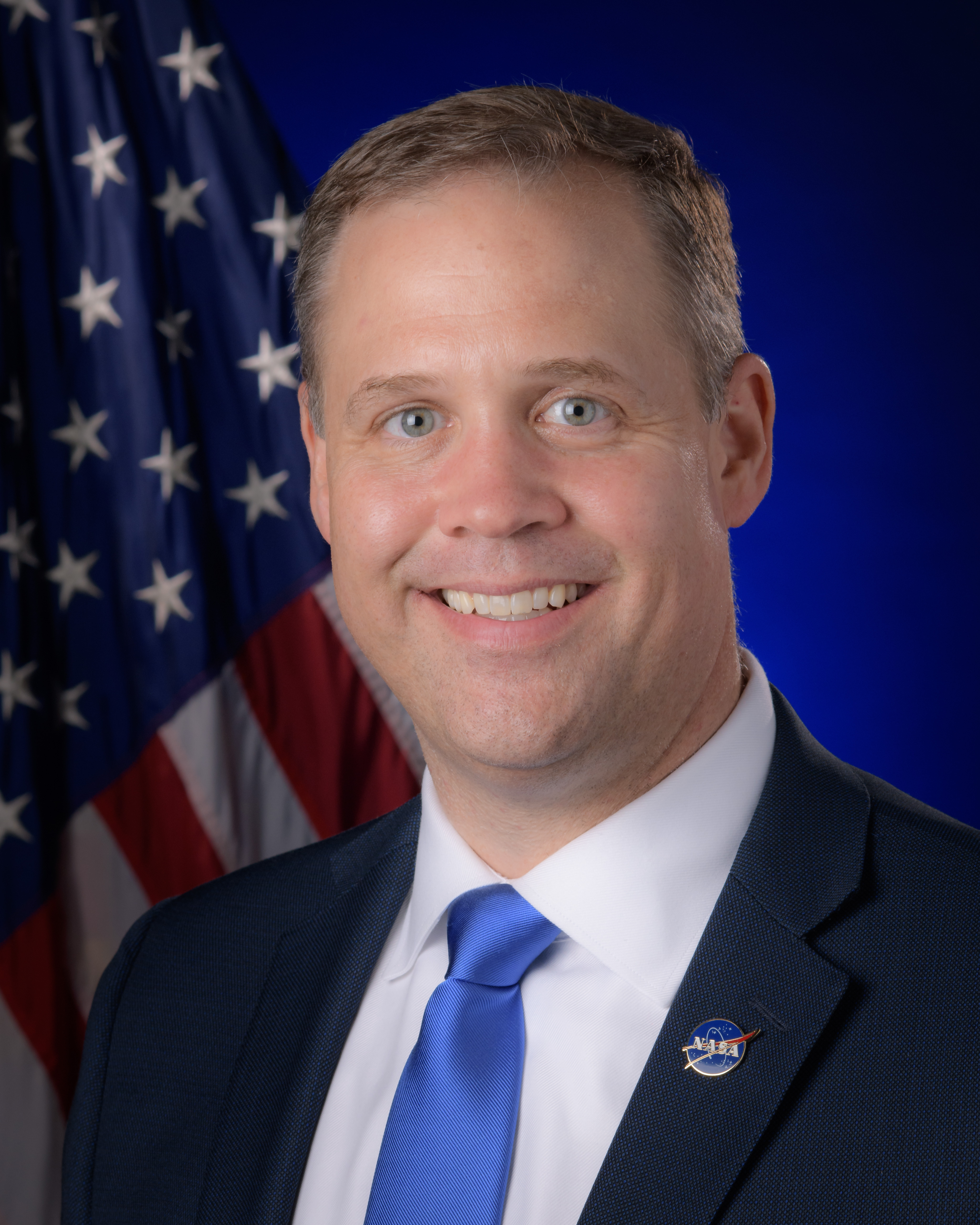
- Official portrait, 2019

13th Administrator of the National Aeronautics and Space Administration
- In office April 23, 2018 – January 20, 2021
- President: Donald Trump
- Deputy: James Morhard
- Preceded by: Charles Bolden
- Succeeded by: Bill Nelson

Member of the U.S. House of Representatives from Oklahoma's 1st district
- In office January 3, 2013 – April 23, 2018
- Preceded by: John Sullivan
- Succeeded by: Kevin Hern

Personal details
- Born: James Frederick Bridenstine; June 15, 1975 (age 51) Ann Arbor, Michigan, U.S.
- Party: Republican
- Spouse: Michelle Ivory (m. 2004)
- Children: 3
- Education: Rice University (BA); Cornell University (MBA)

Military service
- Allegiance: United States
- Branch/service: United States Navy; Navy Reserve; United States Air Force; Air National Guard
- Years of service: 1998–2007 (active); 2010–2015 (reserve); 2015–present (guard)
- Rank: Lieutenant Commander (Navy) Major (Air National Guard)
- Unit: Oklahoma Air National Guard
- Battles/wars: War on terror Afghanistan Campaign
- Awards: See list: Navy and Marine Corps Commendation Medal (2) (with valor) Navy and Marine Corps Achievement Medal Navy Unit Commendation Navy E Ribbon Global War on Terrorism Expeditionary Medal Global War on Terrorism Service Medal National Defense Service Medal Armed Forces Expeditionary Medal Sea Service Deployment Ribbon Expert Pistol Medal

James Frederick Bridenstine (born June 15, 1975) is an American politician and military pilot who served as the 13th administrator of the National Aeronautics and Space Administration (NASA). Bridenstine was the United States representative for Oklahoma's 1st congressional district, based in Tulsa from January 3, 2013, to April 23, 2018. He is a member of the Republican Party. Bridenstine currently works in the private sector and holds positions at Voyager Space Holdings, Viasat, Acorn Growth Companies and Firefly Aerospace.

On September 1, 2017, President Donald Trump nominated Bridenstine to be the administrator of NASA; he was confirmed by the U.S. Senate on April 19, 2018, by a party-line vote of 50–49. Bridenstine was on the Committee on Science, Space and Technology during his time in Congress. He is the first elected official to be appointed NASA Administrator.

Bridenstine stepped down as the head of NASA on January 20, 2021, to make way for a new leader in the Biden Administration. Former Senator and astronaut Bill Nelson was announced on March 19, 2021, as his chosen successor.

== Early life and education ==
Bridenstine was born on June 15, 1975, in Ann Arbor, Michigan. He grew up in Arlington, Texas, the son of an elementary school teacher and an accountant, where he became an Eagle Scout.

His family moved to Tulsa, Oklahoma, during his junior year of high school, and during his senior year he was captain of the Jenks High School swim team and Oklahoma Swimmer of the Year; as of mid-2016, was one of a team of four that held the Oklahoma state record in the 200-meter freestyle relay for age group 17–18.

Bridenstine graduated from Jenks High School in 1993, and earned a scholarship to Rice University in Houston, Texas, but injured his shoulder during his second year; he took five years to graduate, in 1998. He triple majored with a Bachelor of Arts in Economics, Psychology, and Business. He later received a Master's in Business Administration from Cornell University, awarded in 2009.

== Military and early career ==
Bridenstine joined the Navy in May 1998, after graduating from Rice University. He was a Naval Aviator in both the active duty United States Navy and the United States Naval Reserve. He flew the E-2C Hawkeye aircraft as part of a carrier air wing with the U.S. Navy and in Central and South America in support of the war on drugs with the Naval Reserve. He later moved to the F/A-18 Hornet and flew at the Naval Strike and Air Warfare Center, in Nevada

In 2006, Bridenstine bought stock in the Rocket Racing League (RRL), which planned to begin races in 2008. In January 2007, he met with Tulsa city officials, asking for support for establishing a team in that city, and later in 2007 he invested in an RRL team.

In 2007, after the end of his active duty in the Navy, Bridenstine moved to Orlando, Florida, where he worked at Wyle Laboratories, a defense consulting firm. In 2008, Bridenstine and his family moved back to Tulsa to be closer to his family, and he became the chief pilot for the Tulsa team of the RRL.

In December 2008, Bridenstine became the executive director of the Tulsa Air and Space Museum. In November 2009, he proposed to the head of RRL that the league put on an air show in Tulsa, and in February 2010 the museum announced that it would partner with RRL for the show. The April 2010 show attracted around 40,000 spectators. Bridenstine left the executive director's position in August 2010, along with the museum's financial controller and the director of marketing.

In 2010, Bridenstine began serving in the Navy Reserve. In 2015, two years after becoming a U.S. Representative, he transferred his Reserve commission and joined the Oklahoma Air National Guard.

== U.S. House of Representatives ==
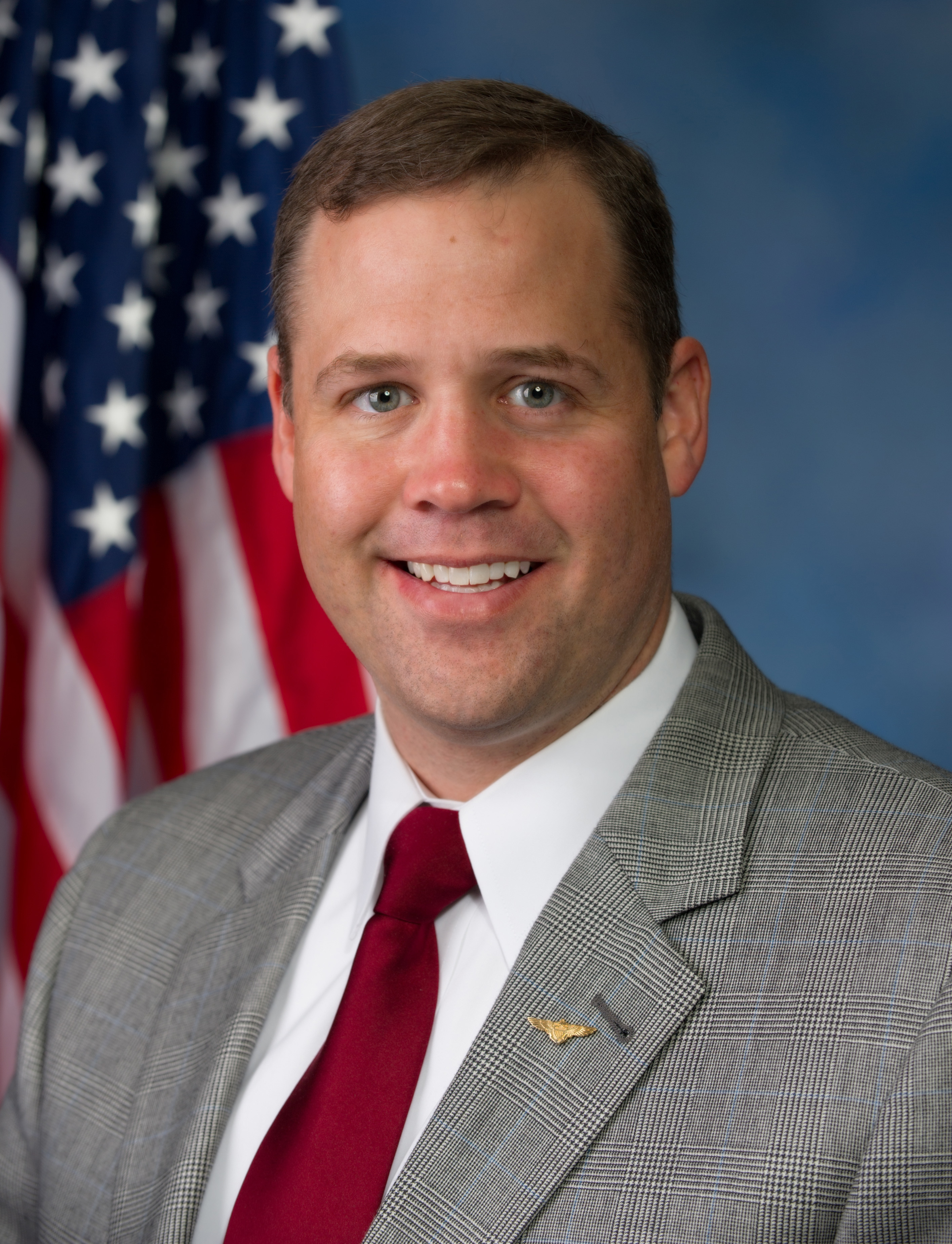
Bridenstine's official congressional portrait, 2013

=== Elections ===
==== 2012 ====
In September 2011, Bridenstine launched a campaign to unseat five-term incumbent U.S. Congressman John Sullivan. Bridenstine won the June 2012 Republican primary election with 54% of the vote. Although he identified with the Tea Party and was perceived as running to Sullivan's right, Bridenstine's actual policy statements differed little from those of Sullivan.

Bridenstine had effectively clinched a seat in Congress by ousting Sullivan in the Republican primary. The 1st is a heavily Republican district with a Cook Partisan Voting Index of R+16, and has been in Republican hands since 1987. In the November 2012 general election, Bridenstine defeated Democratic nominee John Olson 63%–32%, winning all five counties in the district.

==== 2014 ====
Bridenstine ran unopposed in the 2014 election. His top campaign contributors were Northrop Grumman, Latshaw Drilling, American Optometric Association, Citizens United and the Every Republican is Crucial Political Action Committee. He received $29,000 from donors associated with the Turquoise Council of Americans and Eurasians and the Assembly of the Friends of Azerbaijan (AFAZ), per an analysis of OpenSecrets.

==== 2016 ====
Bridenstine retained his seat in the U.S. House of Representatives in the 2016 election. Following the 2016 presidential election, Bridenstine was viewed as a possible candidate for either NASA administrator or Secretary of the Air Force under the Donald Trump administration. Bridenstine had already declared that he would not run for re-election in 2018 after making a three-term pledge.

=== Committee assignments ===
Bridenstine sat on the Committee on Armed Services and Committee on Science, Space and Technology during the 113th, 114th, and 115th Congresses.

Within the Armed Services Committee, Bridenstine has sat on the Subcommittee on Seapower and Projection Forces and Subcommittee on Strategic Forces. Within the Science Committee, Bridenstine has sat on the Subcommittee on Environment (Chairman) and Subcommittee on Space. He is a member of the Freedom Caucus and the House Baltic Caucus.

=== Ethics investigation ===
Bridenstine's amendment to the defense appropriations bill came following a visit to Baku upon invitation of the State Oil Company of the Azerbaijan Republic for ten members of Congress and 32 staff members; the visit became the subject of an ethics investigation. The members received numerous gifts during the trip totaling thousands of dollars in value. In 2013, Bridenstine returned two of the gifts (a pair of rugs worth several thousand dollars) to the donor; he had been the only lawmaker to disclose gifts from the trip on his financial disclosure forms. In 2015, he turned over remaining gifts received during the trip to the House Clerk, around the time that a watchdog report that indicated that the source of the funding for the trip had not been properly declared. The OCE and House Ethics committee found that lawmakers and aides had no way of knowing that the trip was funded improperly.

== NASA administrator ==
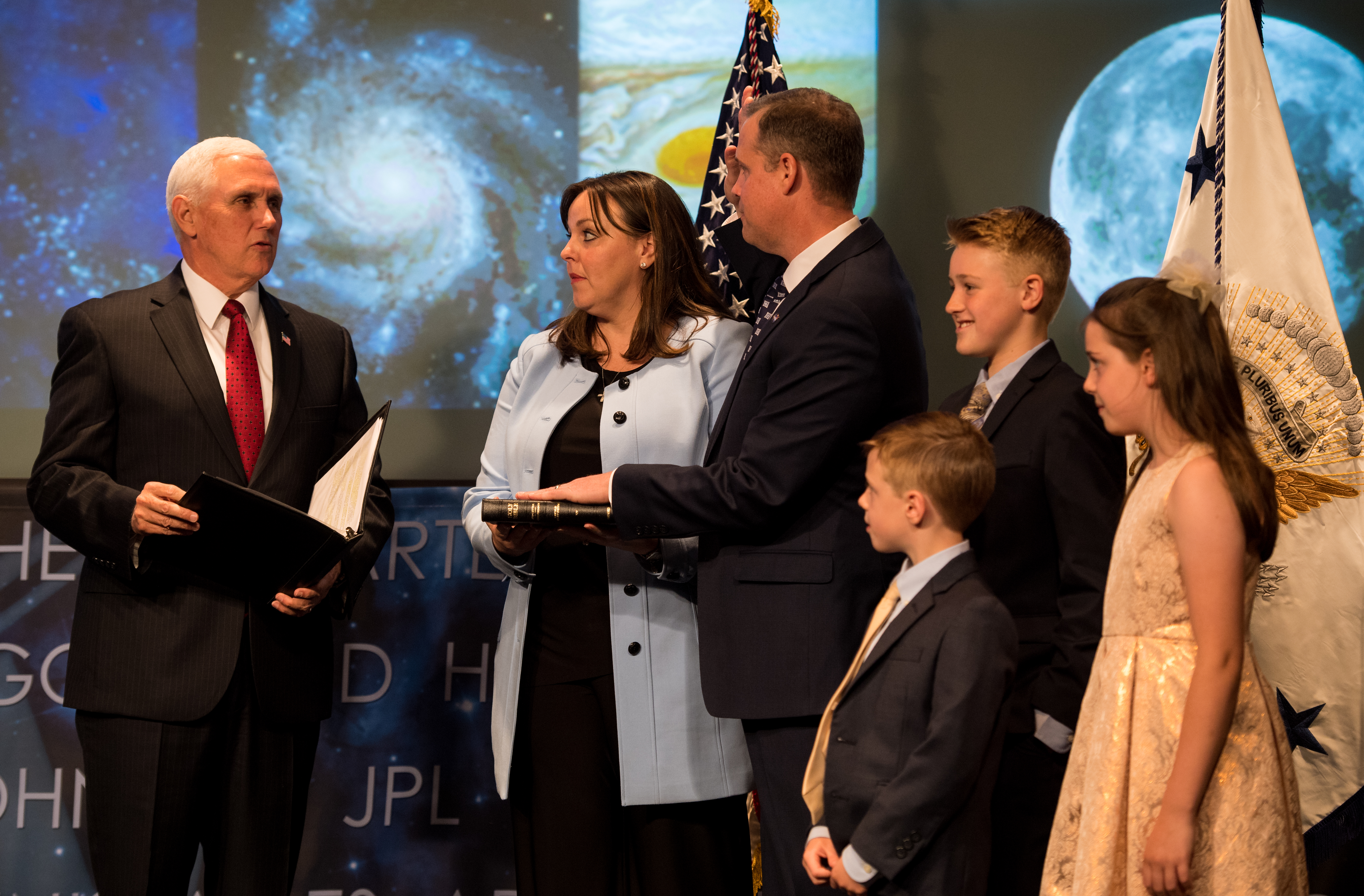
Bridenstine is sworn in as NASA's thirteenth administrator by Vice President Mike Pence (2018).

=== Nomination ===
On September 1, 2017, the White House announced that Bridenstine was President Donald Trump's preferred pick to head NASA. The choice was quickly criticized by both Republican and Democratic politicians, saying that NASA should be headed by a "space professional", not a politician or a Trump ally. Critics drew attention to Bridenstine's lack of formal qualifications in science or engineering, unlike previous appointees to that post. Florida Republican Senator Marco Rubio said that Bridenstine's political history could prove controversial and delay the confirmation process, saying "I just think it could be devastating for the space program", while Democratic Senator Bill Nelson, also of Florida and a former Payload Specialist for NASA who flew on STS-61-C, said "The head of NASA ought to be a space professional, not a politician." Nelson himself would be nominated to lead NASA by President Biden in 2021.

CNN found that Bridenstine's Facebook, YouTube and Twitter accounts had been entirely deleted, while most of the interviews on his Soundcloud were deleted, at a time when Congress would be examining his record for his confirmation hearing.

Bridenstine has criticized NASA spending on climate science and has supported increased privatization of U.S. civil and military space activities. According to NPR, Bridenstine's past climate change denial views "are sure to alarm scientists, because NASA conducts a huge amount of the global research on climate change." NASA finds that climate-warming trends are "extremely likely due to human activities" and has written on its website that "the small amount of dissent tends to come from a few vocal scientists who are not experts in the climate field or do not understand the scientific basis of long-term climate processes". Since his confirmation, Bridenstine has said that he agrees with the scientific consensus around human contributions to climate change.

Eric Stallmer, president of the Commercial Spaceflight Federation, said he was "very impressed with [Bridenstine's] deep knowledge of space technology issues and his record of strong leadership in promoting positive change." The decision to pick Bridenstine was also praised by Senator Ted Cruz.

According to Science Magazine, "many expect that Bridenstine, who has written about the commercial potential of exploiting lunar resources, could shift the agency's emphasis [from its long-term mission of sending humans to Mars] toward the moon." ABC News wrote that Bridenstine was in favor of both human missions to the Moon and Mars.

The U.S. Senate confirmed Bridenstine on April 19, 2018, by a party-line vote of 50–49. He became the first member of Congress to lead NASA. Bridenstine was sworn in by Vice President Mike Pence at the NASA Headquarters building in Washington, D.C. on April 23, 2018.

=== Space Launch System ===
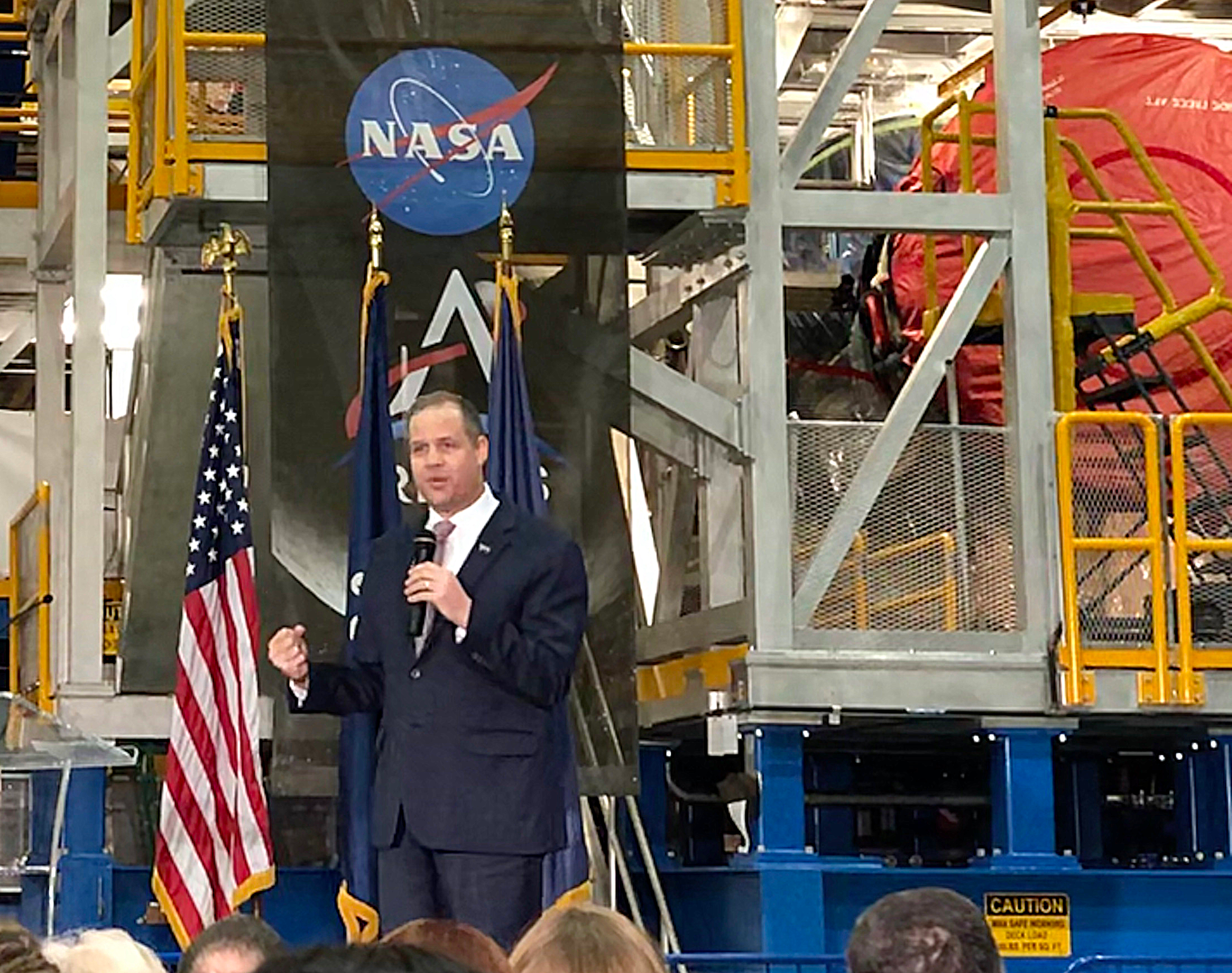
Bridenstine speaking in front of the SLS Core for the Artemis I mission (2019)

In March 2019, Mike Pence pushed NASA to land humans on the Moon in 2024 instead of the initially planned 2028. Bridenstine stated that for it to happen, the Space Launch System would need to be accelerated, along with various other aspects such as the LOP-G, an orbiting space station around the Moon. Bridenstine also considered commercial Heavy-Lift rockets such as the Delta IV Heavy or Falcon Heavy. The idea was scrapped due to the logistical issue of docking an Orion and a European Service Module and the aerodynamics of using a Falcon Heavy.

=== Private space companies ===
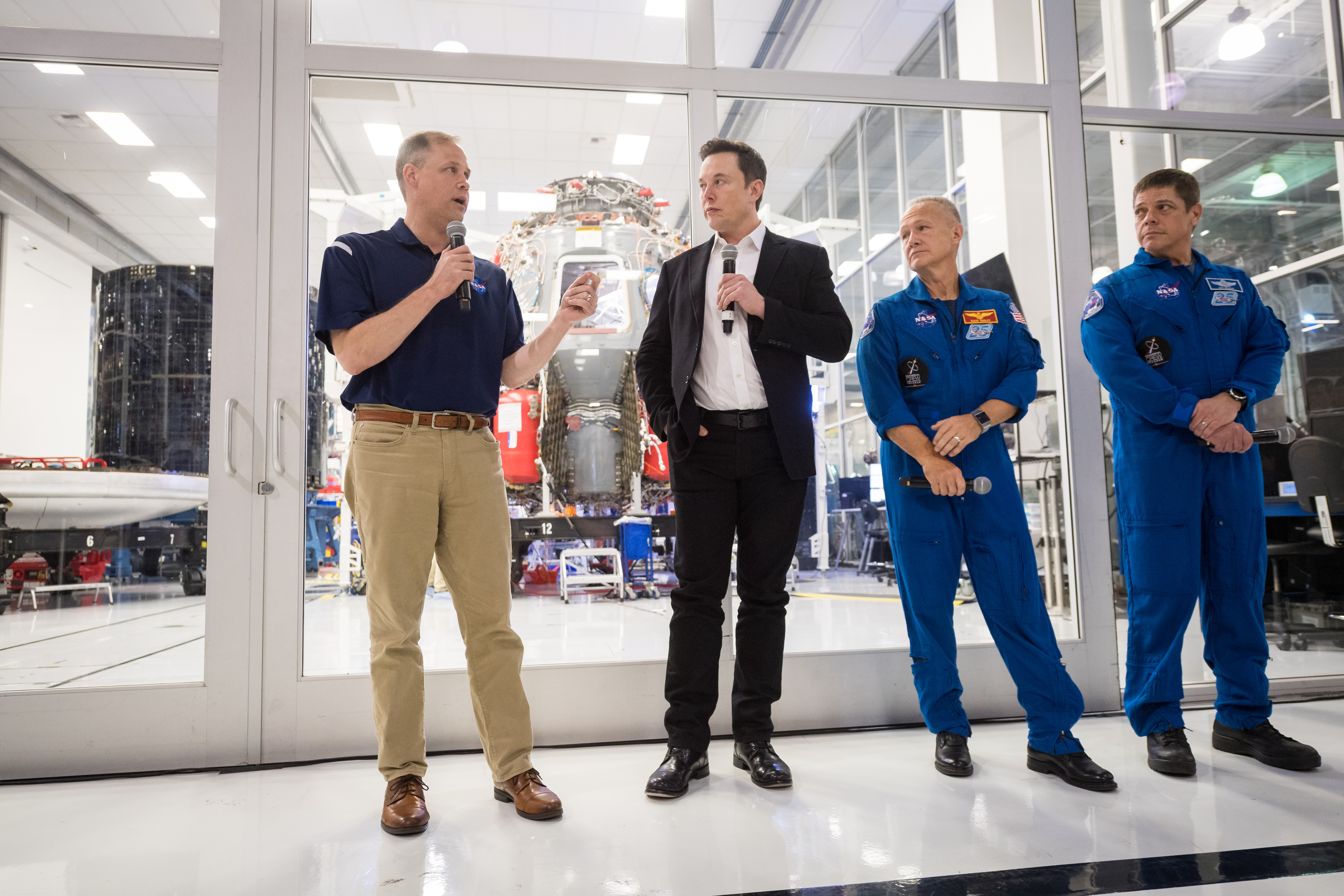
Bridenstine, Elon Musk and NASA astronauts Robert Behnken and Douglas Hurley in front of the Crew Dragon capsule Endeavour as it was being prepared for the Crew Dragon Demo-2 mission (2019)

Bridenstine established a working relationship with SpaceX CEO and Founder Elon Musk. Following the DM-1 mission in March 2019, Musk posited the need for humans to have a base on the Moon, to which Bridenstine responded, "that's the goal."

=== Artemis program ===
Bridenstine played a leading role in implementing President Trump's Space Policy Directive One and developed the planned architecture for a return to the Moon. Bridenstine later named the program the Artemis program. Bridenstine also decided that the lunar lander for the Artemis program would be developed commercially similar to the model used for NASA's Commercial Crew Program.

== Post-public career ==
After two and a half years in the role, Bridenstine stepped down as the head of NASA, with one commentator noting that he "largely succeeded in pushing the agency forward and will leave it better than he found it."

Following the end of his tenure as NASA Administrator, Bridenstine returned to his hometown of Tulsa, Oklahoma. On January 25, 2021, Acorn Growth Companies announced that he was hired as a dedicated senior advisor.

On April 1, 2021, Bridenstine joined the board of directors of satellite operator Viasat in his second private sector role since stepping down as NASA's administrator.

On April 7, 2021, Denver-based Voyager Space Holdings, which has been buying businesses to build a vertically integrated space exploration company, announced they had appointed Bridenstine to chair its advisory board. Dylan Taylor, chairman and CEO of Voyager, said Bridenstine's expertise would help guide the company's "aggressive and ambitious growth plan."

Bridenstine joined the board of directors for Starlab Space, a joint venture of Voyager Space and Airbus, in January, 2024.

As of 2024, Bridenstine serves on the advisory board of the National Security Space Association.

In May of 2026, Bridenstine became CEO of Quantum Space.

== Political positions ==
While in Congress, Bridenstine was a member of the House Freedom Caucus.

=== Space ===
Bridenstine focused heavily on space policy during his tenure in Congress, stating "[o]ur very way of life depends on space, the way we communicate, the way we navigate, the way we produce food and energy, the way we conduct banking." In April 2016 at the 32nd Annual Space Symposium, Bridenstine introduced H.R. 4945, the American Space Renaissance Act, comprehensive reform legislation with provisions affecting national security, civil, and commercial space policy.

In addition, Bridenstine proposed legislation related to the regulatory process overseeing certain non-traditional space activities, and helped secure funding for the Federal Aviation Administration's Office of Commercial Space Transportation. Recognizing his efforts, in 2015 SpaceNews named Bridenstine as one of five game changers in the world in space.

=== Environment and climate ===
Before becoming the chief administrator of NASA, Bridenstine rejected the scientific consensus behind global climate change and in a 2013 speech on the House floor stated that global temperatures stopped rising ten years earlier. Bridenstine criticized the Obama administration for spending "30 times as much money" on climate science as on weather forecasting. PolitiFact says of this claim that "Bridenstine does have a point that climate change research exceeds weather forecasting expenditures, but he’s overstated the discrepancy," and they rate the assertion as "mostly false".

In the 114th Congress, Bridenstine was the Chairman of the Environment Subcommittee of the House Science, Space, and Technology Committee. In that role, he pushed the National Oceanic and Atmospheric Administration "... to integrate commercial data into its weather forecasting models." In September 2016, NOAA awarded two contracts to private weather satellite firms to provide data for its use.

In 2017, Bridenstine supported James Langevin's legislation requiring the Defense Department to report on the effects of climate change on military installations and strategic battle plans. According to journalist Keith Cowing, Bridenstine's support for the Langevin amendment "was widely seen as being instrumental in its passage."

By May 2018, Bridenstine had reversed his public position on climate change. At a town hall meeting in Washington D.C., Bridenstine said that "I fully believe and know that the climate is changing. I also know that we humans beings are contributing to it in a major way. Carbon dioxide is a greenhouse gas. We're putting it into the atmosphere in volumes that we haven't seen, and that greenhouse gas is warming the planet. That is absolutely happening, and we are responsible for it."

== Personal life ==
On November 6, 2004, in Fort Worth, Texas, Bridenstine married Michelle Deanne Ivory.

U.S. House of Representatives
Preceded by John Sullivan	Member of the U.S. House of Representatives from Oklahoma's 1st congressional district 2013–2018	Succeeded by Kevin Hern
Government offices
Preceded by Charles Bolden	Administrator of the National Aeronautics and Space Administration; 2018–2021	Succeeded by Bill Nelson
U.S. order of precedence (ceremonial)
Preceded by Brad Carson as Former U.S. Representative	Order of precedence of the United States as Former U.S. Representative	Succeeded by Steve Russell as Former U.S. Representative
