= Babek gas field =

Offshore gas and condensate structure in the Caspian Sea

- Location of Babek gas field
- Country: Azerbaijan
- Region: Caspian Sea
- Location: Caspian Sea, Azerbaijan
- Block: Umid–Babek
- Offshore/onshore: offshore
- Coordinates: 40°00′32″N 50°47′53″E
- Operator: Umid Babek Operating Company (UBOC)
- Service contractors: Aquaterra Energy

Field history
- Start of development: 2022

Production
- Recoverable oil (million tonnes): 80,000,000
- Recoverable gas: 400×10^{9} m^{3} (14×10^{12} cu ft)

The Babek gas field (officially categorized as the Babek prospective structure) is an offshore natural gas and condensate structure located in the Azerbaijani sector of the Caspian Sea. It is operated by the Umid Babek Operating Company (UBOC) under a Risk Service Agreement covering the Umid–Babek exploration block.

== Reserves ==
The structure holds estimated recoverable reserves of up to 400 billion cubic metres of natural gas and 80 million tonnes of gas condensate.

== Exploration and drilling ==
In July 2022, UBOC initiated a high-pressure high-temperature (HPHT) exploration program targeting the BX-01 well within the Babek structure. The geological parameters of the prospect presented complex reservoir conditions, with wellhead pressures exceeding 12,000 psi.

To safely conduct drilling operations, the operator contracted UK-based Aquaterra Energy to deploy a 15,000 psi subsea riser system utilizing gas-tight metal-to-metal AQC-SR connectors. The BX-01 well marked a regional technical milestone, as it was the first time a subsea well in the Caspian Sea was engineered to be drilled from a jack-up mobile offshore drilling unit instead of a traditional semi-submersible platform, operating in 62 metres of water depth.

In May 2026, Reuters reported, citing three industry sources, that BP would become the operator of the Babek field, which would be separated from the SOCAR-led unit into a standalone project.

== See also ==
- Energy in Azerbaijan
- State Oil Company of Azerbaijan Republic
- Southern Gas Corridor
