= Azerbaijan Transport and Communication Holding =

- Azərbaycan Nəqliyyat və Kommunikasiya Holdinqi

Agency overview
- Formed: 7 November 2024
- Jurisdiction: Government of Republic of Azerbaijan
- Agency executives: Shahin Babayev, CEO; Rashad Nabiyev, Chairman of the Board

Azerbaijan Transport and Communication Holding also known as AZCON Holding is a public entity responsible for managing state-owned enterprises and public legal entities, focusing on improving operations, competitiveness, and financial stability. Its leadership includes a supervisory board and an executive director, with certain decisions made in coordination with the President. It was established based on a decree signed by the President of the Republic of Azerbaijan on November 7, 2024.

== Supervisory Board ==
The chairman of the supervisory board is the Minister of Digital Development and Transport of the Republic of Azerbaijan.

Members of the Supervisory Board:

- Deputy Minister of Economy of the Republic of Azerbaijan
- Deputy Minister of Finance of the Republic of Azerbaijan
- Deputy Minister of Digital Development and Transport of the Republic of Azerbaijan
- Director of the State Civil Aviation Agency
- Chairman of the Board of the State Maritime and Port Agency
- Chairman of the Board of the Azerbaijan Space Agency (Azercosmos).

== Management Composition ==
The management of Azerbaijan Transport and Communication Holding (AZCON) includes the state enterprises, as well as commercial entities with state shares and public legal entities, approved by the Decree of the President of the Republic of Azerbaijan. These include:

- Azerbaijan Airlines Closed Joint Stock Company
- Azerbaijan Railways Closed Joint Stock Company
- Azerbaijan Caspian Shipping Closed Joint Stock Company
- Baku Metro Closed Joint Stock Company
- Baku International Sea Trade Port Closed Joint Stock Company
- BakuBus Limited Liability Company
- Baku Shipyard

The following institutions under the Ministry of Digital Development and Transport of the Republic of Azerbaijan:

- Azerbaijan Space Agency (Azercosmos) - Public Legal Entity
- Aztelecom Limited Liability Company
- Azerbaijan International Telecom (AzInTelecom) Limited Liability Company
- Azerpost Limited Liability Company
- Baku Taxi Service Limited Liability Company
- Radio-Television Broadcasting and Satellite Communications Production Union
