= CIPCO =

CIPCO may refer to:

- Central Iowa Power Cooperative
- Caspian International Petroleum Company
