= SOCAR Gas Processing Plant =

- Industry: natural-gas processing
- Founded: 1958; 68 years ago in Baku, Azerbaijan

SOCAR Gas Processing Plant is a natural gas and gas products processing factory that joined to the structure of State Oil Company of Azerbaijan Republic (SOCAR) with regard to the presidential decree dated October 7, 2009. The factory carries out the production of natural gas, natural gas liquids, natural gasoline, gas condensate, heavy condensates, dry gas, commercial butane and commercial propane-butane mixture. The plant is situated in Lokbatan settlement, Baku. The director of the Gas Processing Plant is Agshin Pashayev.

== History ==
In 1958, "GIPROAZNEFT" institute, which operated in the former Soviet period, designed the Gas Processing Plant. The first and second building phases were completed, respectively, in 1961 and in 1963-1964. During the first phase, three units were put into operation with other all supporting facilities. The units were unit 3 contains gas-gasoline separator equipment, natural gasoline stripping and gas condensate processing unit 4. The gasoline-gas separator equipment in unit 2 and unit 1 were established during the second phase.

The initial design of the plant was capable to process 4.5 billion cubic meters of natural gas per year. The annual processing capacity increased to 6.5 billion cubic meters as a result of the reconstruction works in 1986. During the reconstruction works two gas measuring points were constructed. At the same time, underground gas pipelines were laid over trestles and underwater pipes replaced with surface pipelines. Two measuring plants “high-pressure output of gas” and “total output of gas” were built in 2003-2004. In 2009 additional line of the “total output of gas” plant was established.

== Trends in gas processing ==
Since early 2017, the volume of recovered natural gas after processing in the Plant was 1.68 billion cubic meters. Statistics reveal that 63% of the annual natural gas processing capacity of the plant was used. Besides, more than eleven thousand tons of naphtha and 7500 tons of technical butane were processed and 4600 tons of technical butane were transferred to Azerikimya Production Union. There is an agreement between Gas Processing Plant and Azneft Production Union. According to this contract, the plant processes gas of Azneft SOCAR and transfers producing gas to Azerigas.

== See also ==
- Azerbaijan International Operating Company
- Caspian International Petroleum Company
