= Baku Shipyard =

Azerbaijani shipyard plant

Bakı Gəmiqayırma Zavodu
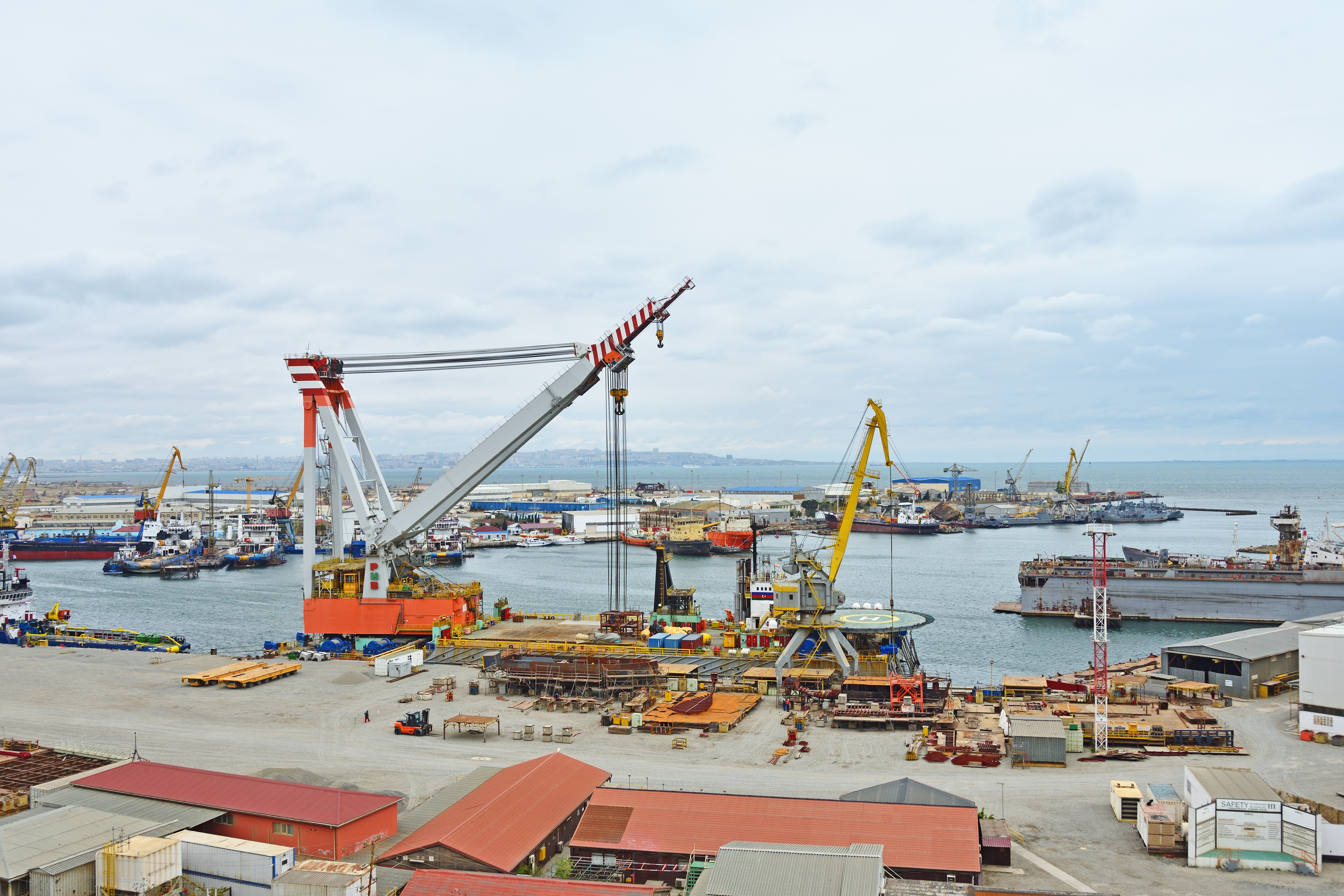
- Type: Public
- Industry: Shipbuilding
- Founded: 2013
- Headquarters: Baku, Azerbaijan
- Area served: Caspian Sea
- Products: Ships, Tankers, Ferries
- Number of employees: 2,500
- Parent: (Parent Company AZCON Holding)
- Website: www.bakushipyard.com

Baku Shipyard LLC is a shipyard plant in Azerbaijan. It is a joint venture between State Oil Company of Azerbaijan Republic, Azerbaijan Investment Company (AIC) and Keppel Corporation. The construction and operation of the plant is also a joint effort between the three companies.

== History ==
Construction of the Baku Shipyard LLC was launched in March 2010.

The plant is considered to be the largest shipyard plant in the countries bordering the Caspian Sea. Its production capacity is 25 thousand tons of metal constructions per year. The total area of the enterprise is 620 thousand square meters. Semi-station buildings have been constructed in order to provide the electrical supply to the plant. In addition, a 1630-meter-long bridge, five-story administrative building, training center, various offices and warehouses, production workshops, repairs, dining-room, medical center, and compressor building were constructed.

The plant was designed by the “Royal Haskoning” British Company and bidding was held for the project. The plant has been provided by equipment manufactured in Finland, the Netherlands, Germany, Czech Republic, Great Britain, South Korea and Singapore.

Construction of the Baku Shipyard LLC, which was jointly implemented by the AIC, SOCAR and Singapore's Keppel, was completed in the third quarter of 2013. SOCAR, Azerbaijan Investment Company (AIC) and Keppel Offshore & Marine Company have established “Baku Shipyard LLC” joint venture for the construction and operation of the plant. In accordance with the contract signed between the founders on 10 December 2010, SOCAR had 65%, AIC had 25%, and Keppel Offshore & Marine Company had 10% share in the charter capital of the plant. After putting into operation of the plant in the first stage, 4 tankers with the capacity of 15,000 tons per year, 4 seafarers or a towing tanker were constructed. In addition to the construction of new ships, work on repairing ships is also carried out at the plant. Taking into account the increase in the volume of cargo transportation in the Caspian Sea, at the second stage, the plant was able to build tankers with the capacity of 60-70 thousand tons per year. Construction of the shipyard cost Azerbaijan $470 million.

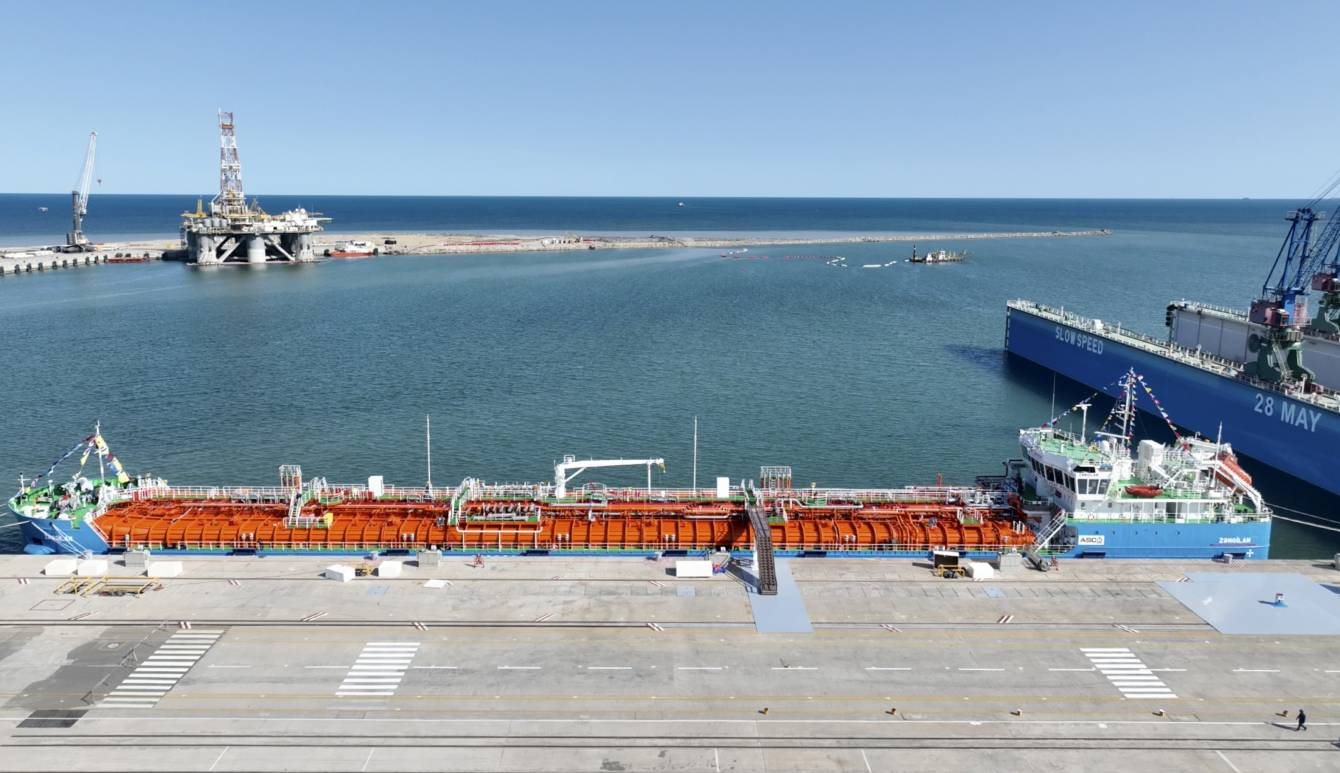
"Zangilan" tanker July, 2 2024

== Economic importance ==
In the production process technology such as metalworking, welding, plating, 3D digital conveying equipment is used. Immediately after the launch, the first order was a semiconductor device - DSS 38M, which was ordered by Caspian Drilling Company LTD. At the shipyard, the deck of the device's pantheon, as well as the upper deck was made. It is also possible to repair 80-100 ships a year in the plant. The number of employees of the plant exceeds 2000.

The company has constructed the “Khankendi” ship in 2017. The Khankendi underwater construction boom, which was inaugurated in September 2017, will work on the Shah Deniz field for 11 years. The ship will be deployed for the Shah Deniz-2 project in 2017-2027 and used for underwater installation.

"Khankendi" DNV GL was built under the supervision of Norway and Germany classification. The maximum speed of this rare ship is 13.5 knots. The ship with the length of 155m, the width of 32m, and the height of 13 meters has a dynamic positioning system for operation at a 3.5 m high wave. A basic crane for underwater operations of up to 600 meters, two diving capsules for 18 people, two remote control units, a reinforced hardware shaft and other essential equipment. The total capacity of the underwater construction vessel is 17,600 tons, water consumption is 6,5 meters, load capacity is over 5,000 metric tons.

== See also ==
- Azerbaijan Caspian Shipping Company
