= Port of Baku =

Baku International Sea Trade Port CJSC (Port of Baku)
- Interactive map of Baku International Sea Trade Port CJSC (Port of Baku)
- Location within Azerbaijan

Location
- Country: Azerbaijan
- Location: Baku
- Coordinates: 40.2343°N 49.5256°E
- UN/LOCODE: AZBAK

Details
- Opened: 1902
- Owned by: Azerbaijan Railways, (Parent Company AZCON Holding)
- No. of berths: 13
- Draft depth: 7.0 m.

Statistics
- Annual cargo tonnage: ▲15 million tons
- Annual container volume: 100,000 TEU
- Website portofbaku.com/en

Port of Baku, located on the ancient Silk Road connecting Europe and Asia, is a prime transport and logistics hub of Eurasia. It covers an area of 400 hectares. Being an important segment of the Trans-Caspian International Transport Route, the Port of Baku, with its modern operating system provides prompt cargo services and has at its disposal open and covered storage facilities designed for all types of cargo.

== History ==
The Arab travelers of the 10th century, such as Ibn Haukal and Al-Mugaddasi, along with European maps like the Catalan map from 1375, which referred to the Caspian Sea as the “Sea of Baku,” and notes by Azerbaijani geographer Abdurrashid Bakuvi, provide valuable insights into the historical significance of the Port of Baku. Additionally, travelers and scholars such as Marco Polo (13th century), Adam Olearius (17th century), Afanasiy Nikitin (15th century), and Evliya Chelebi (17th century) contribute to a comprehensive understanding of Baku's international relations. Historical documents and records confirm Baku's role as a major port on the Caspian Sea, engaging in trade with various states. Notably, the 1564 decree by Safavid ruler Tahmasib I, appointing Sheikh Zahid as the first minister of the Baku port, and the “Russian campaign” agreement of Great Britain regarding communication between Russia, Iran, and Azerbaijan along the Volga-Caspian route, highlight the port's significance. The Baku Trade Port Authority, which began operations on July 21, 1902, established the Port of Baku as the busiest port in the Russian Empire, surpassing even Saint Petersburg in cargo transshipment. By 1911, eight out of the nine motor ships in the Russian fleet were based at Baku.

== Modern Port of Baku ==
The Port of Baku is located 70 km from the capital, Baku, at the junction of the main railways and highways of Azerbaijan, and has 13 berths, including a Ro-Ro, a ferry terminal, and a general cargo terminal. With the completion of the first stage of port construction in 2018, its capacity increased to 15 million tons of cargo and 100,000 TEU equivalent containers. A project for the second stage of port construction is also being developed, after the implementation of which its annual throughput capacity can be increased to 25 million tons and 500,000 TEU containers. Furthermore, its new fertilizer terminal that will have the capacity to handle 2.5 million tons annually is under construction. Through this terminal, regular transportation of fertilizers from the countries of Central Asia, which possess them in large quantities, to the Western countries through the territory of Azerbaijan will be carried out. The facility will have two warehouses with a total capacity of 60,000 tons, and state-of-the-art conveyor systems to unload the various types of fertilizers directly to warehouses or into wagons/rail hoppers at a newly designed wagon loading station. A project for the construction of a wheat terminal and a TIR parking area in the port area has also been prepared.

=== Technical capacities ===
sections	capacities
Total lifting capacity	15 million tons/year
Container loading capacity	100,000 TEU/year
Ferry terminal	6.2 million tons/year
General cargo	1.8 million tons/year
Ro-Ro processing capacity	60,000 wheeled vehicles/year
Passenger capacity	150,000/year
Planned capacity of the vessel	7,000 – 10,000 tons
Planned length of the ship	150–160 m.
Closed warehouse area	9400 sq.m
Open warehouse area	35000 sq.m

== Green Port ==
In 2019, for the first time among the countries of the Caspian region, the Port of Baku was awarded the “Eco Ports” (Green Port) certificate of the European Sea Ports Organization, and in 2021 it successfully passed re-certification. In addition, in 2022, it joined the UN Global Compact. Thus, the strategic activity of the port is aimed to contribute to 11 of the 17 UN Sustainable Development Goals.

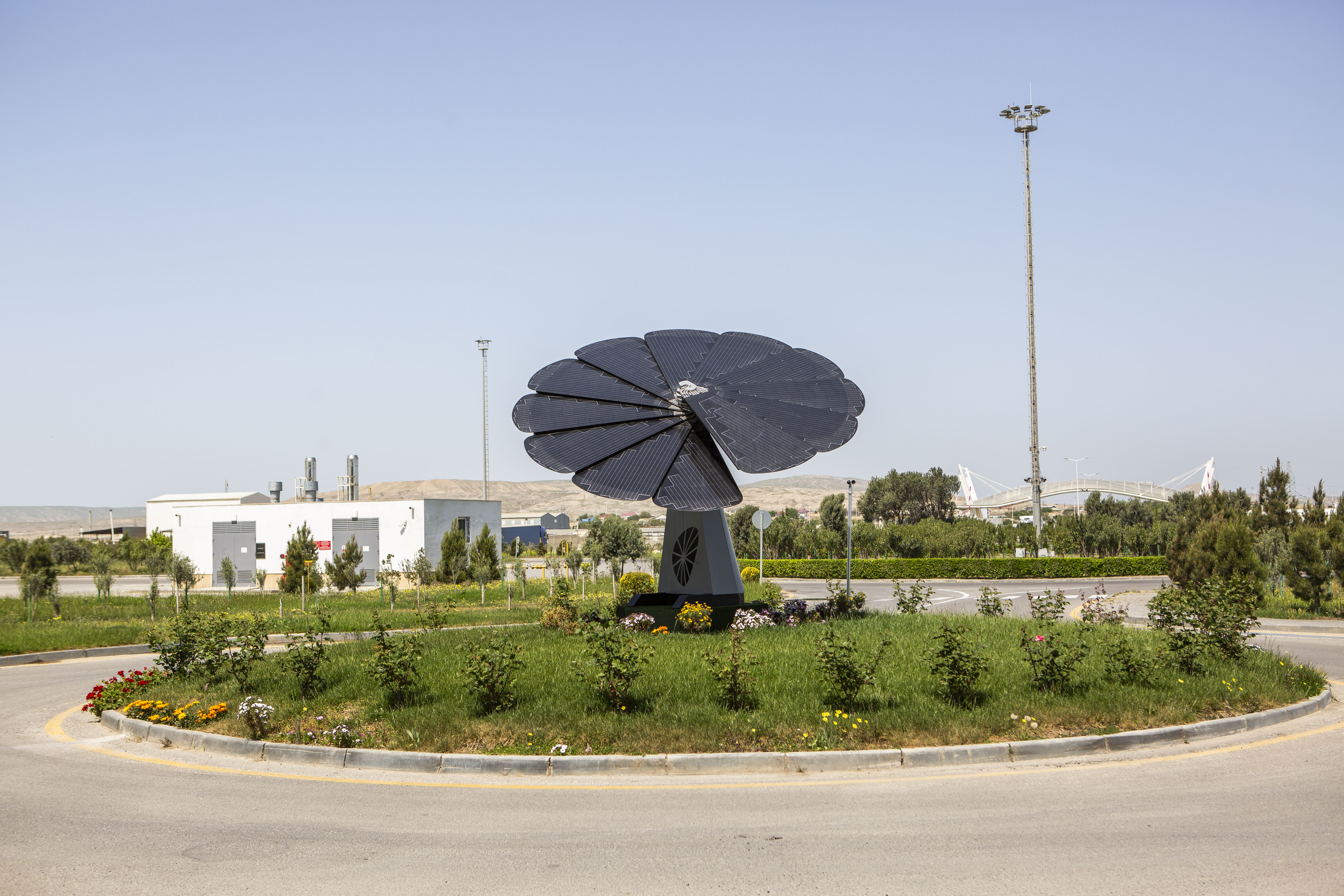
A solar panel at the entrance of the Port of Baku

The Port Environment Review System (PERS) of the European Sea Ports Organization (ESPO) presented the "EcoPorts" certificate to the Port of Baku. The Port Environment Review System (PERS) is an environmental management standard for the European port sector that raises environmental awareness and helps ports achieve sustainable development goals. This standard promotes the application of advanced technologies, especially in aspects of energy use, waste management, air quality, digitization and automation. As a result of continuous and extensive application of the mentioned standards, the Port of Baku has been able to renew this certificate for the 3rd time.

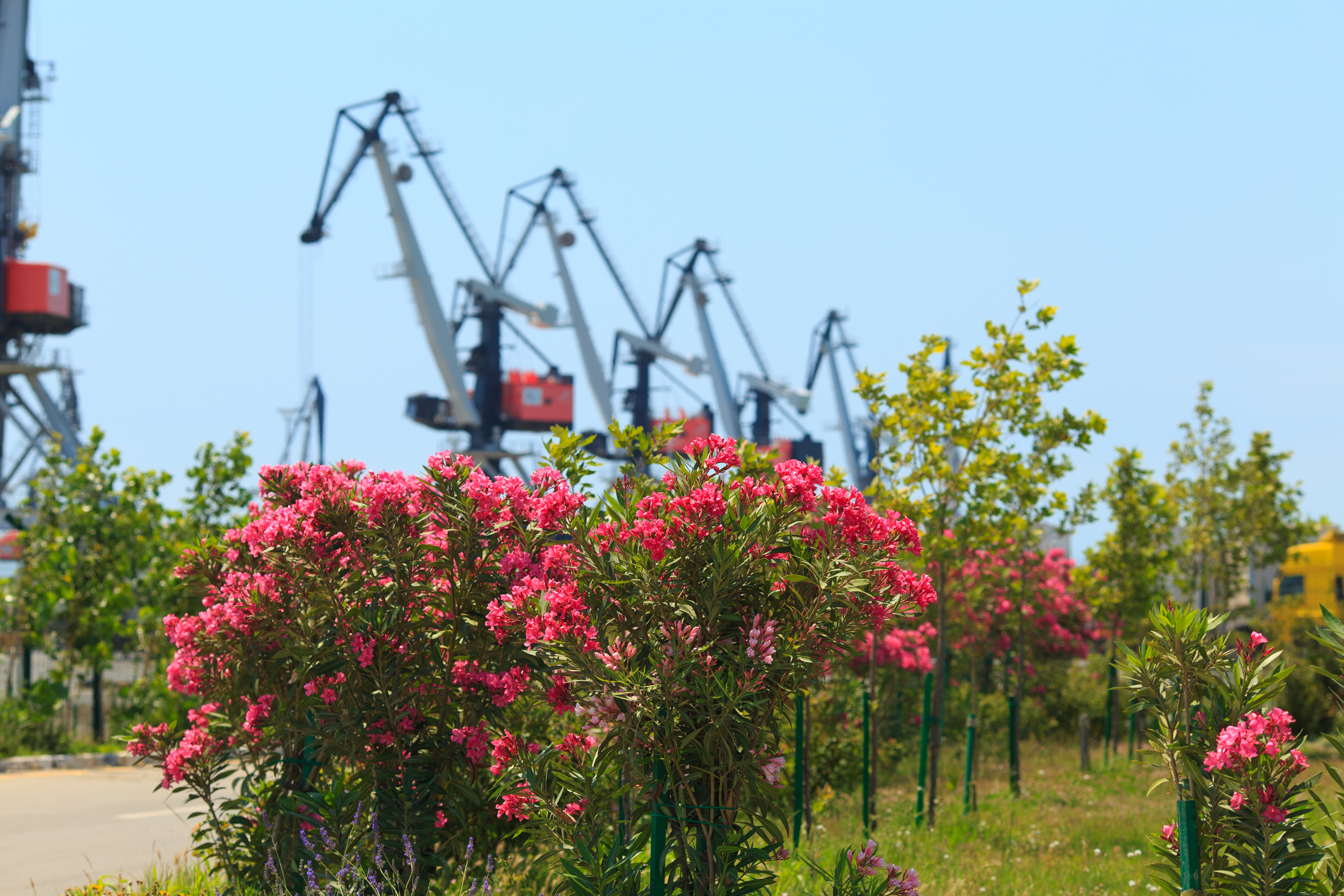
A view of the general cargo terminal

The Port of Baku has set a goal to reach zero net emissions by the year 2035 with its Climate Strategy 2035 Action Plan. Vessel emissions constitute 71% of the total emissions. Additionally, many green projects have been implemented in the port area. 60,000 trees have already been planted with a goal to reach 100,000 by 2025. Eco-cars are now being utilized at the port as well. Overall, the Port of Baku area is the home to a wide range of wild species, including migrating flamingoes, swans, seagulls, cormorants, etc.

== Roboport ==
The Port of Baku has initiated a robotics, coding, and STEAM course called Roboport for Alat schoolchildren. The course gives students the opportunity to develop 21st century skills and grow the technology manufacturers of the future. This project aims to teach and develop basic knowledge related to coding and technology to children from an early age. The course, operating under the slogan "Engineers of the future grow here" is equipped with modern technological equipment, and participants will be involved in practical training by local and foreign professionals.

== Gallery ==
Baku International Sea Trade Port

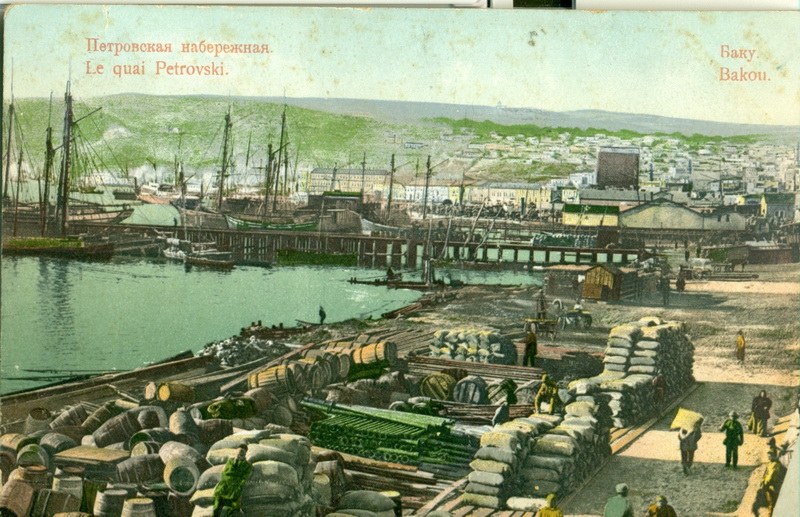
Port of Baku in 1900s

== See also ==
- Transport in Azerbaijan
- State Maritime Administration of Azerbaijan Republic
- Trans-Caspian International Transport Route
- Baku–Tbilisi–Kars railway
- Zangezur corridor
