= Umid gas field =

Caspian Sea gas field

Umid
- Country: Azerbaijan
- Block: Umid-Babek
- Offshore/onshore: Offshore
- Operator: Umid Babek Operating Company (UBOC)

Field history
- Discovery: November 24, 2010
- Start of production: September 2012

Production
- Estimated gas in place: 200×10^{9} m^{3} (7.1×10^{12} cu ft)

Umid gas field (Azerbaijani: Ümid qaz yatağı) is the second largest natural gas field in Azerbaijan. It is situated in the South Caspian Sea, off the coast of Azerbaijan, approximately 75 kilometres (47 mi) southeast of Baku, at a depth of 170 metres (560 ft). In translation from Azerbaijani, Umid means Hope.

== History ==
Umid field is a part of a block previously consisting of Umid and Babek fields. The geophysical works at Umid started in 1953, which were repeated in 1972. A total of 9 wells were drilled in the area from 1977 to 1992; however, no commercially viable fields were discovered at the time. In 2009, SOCAR financed the exploration works at Umid itself. This is the first time since the Contract of the Century that Azerbaijan conducted exploration works entirely on its own. The discovery of 200 bcm and 30-40 million tons of condensate (around 270-360mn bbl) initially forecasted by Khoshbakht Yusifzadeh was announced by SOCAR on November 24, 2010, after successful drilling at 6,500 metres (21,300 ft) on exploration platform Umid-1.

President Ilham Aliyev of Azerbaijan placed enormous hopes on the Umid gas field, remarking in 2010: "This field has a great future". In 2012 President Aliyev continued pinning great hopes on the competent development of the Umid gas block as part of overall major gas export strategy for Azerbaijan: "One of the wonderful events of recent months is that early gas has been produced from “Umid” field. This is a great indicator. The rate of the gas wells is very high. The first well has very encouraging figures. So “Umid” lives up to its name. The discovery of “Umid” by the State Oil Company of Azerbaijan is a historic event. The State Oil Company has managed to develop this large gas field on its own for the first time in recent years."

The joint venture of SOCAR with Nobel Oil Group drilled three wells in the Umid gas field since 2012. One well failed, while the other two produced decreasing amounts of natural gas: in 2012 – 1,500 thousand cubic meters of gas, 2013 – 638,000 cubic meters, and in 2014 - 630,000 cubic meters of gas per day. The plan was to drill a total of six wells producing one million to 1.5 million cubic meters of natural gas per day.

The Nobel Oil Group is a corporate group operating primarily in the USA (Permian Basin), UK, in the Republic of Azerbaijan and in Romania. The Group provides integrated operating services within the oil and gas sector and is also developing its exploration and production capabilities. The group was set up by Azerbaijan-born Mr. Nasib Hasanov, the owner and founder of Nobel Oil Group. As a result of reorganization in 2014, all service segments of the oil and gas industry were united under Nobel Oil Services (UK) Limited, which is a parent company of Global Energy Solutions LLC, Prokon LLC, Absheron Drilling LLC, Llamrei DMCC, etc. The exploration and production business was separated under the name of Nobel Oil E&P (UK) Limited (Nobel Upstream trademark), which is a parent company of Nobel Oil E&P Caspian Limited, Nobel Oil E&P North Sea Limited, Nobel Oil E&P North America (UK) Limited, and Nobel Oil E&P North America LLC.

In October 2014, SOCAR and Nobel Oil Group decided to stop all drilling due to "technical problems in the production process", and announced a new international tender for a fresh foreign partner to lead the way and create a new strategy. As of January 2016, the tender has not materialized. Since March 2015, SOCAR and Nobel Oil Group decided to drill a new appraisal well to get a better estimate of gas reserves in Umid, and hope that this drilling expense will be absorbed by the future foreign partner.. According to the wishes of SOCAR and Nobel Oil Group, the new foreign partner must have not only the skills and experience of deep-water offshore drilling but also have available cash reserves.

According to expert determinations, the Umid ("Hope") gas field was too technologically challenging for the two companies developing it, despite spending some US$5 billion already by 2010, and expecting, at the time of high gas prices, about $45 billion in net operating income. Since 2010, expenses have only increased while natural gas market prices have fallen.

In July 2021, an explosion was recorded a short distance from the Umid-1 platform.

== Ownership and operatorship ==
The field was initially developed by SOCAR Umid LLC, a joint venture established between SOCAR (80%) and Nobel Oil (20%). The joint venture's founding capital was 1,000 AZN.

In 2013, it was reported that Statoil was negotiating to take a major role in developing a cluster comprising the Umid, Babek, Zafar, and Mashal fields.

Following the ratification of a new Risk Service Agreement (RSA) by the National Assembly in 2017, the direct operatorship of the block was officially transferred to the UBOC, while maintaining the 80% SOCAR and 20% Nobel Energy partnership structure.

Since commencing industrial production in 2012, output from the asset has scaled considerably; between 2012 and 2021, gas production expanded nearly 15-fold and condensate production grew 14-fold. Cumulatively, under the first phase of development, the field yielded 12.3 billion cubic metres of natural gas and 1.8 million tonnes of condensate up to September 2025.

As of 2026, UBOC continues to actively manage all upstream drilling and development programs on the block under the leadership of CEO Elkhan Bashirov, who was appointed to head the operating company in July 2025. In April 2026, UBOC signed a contract extension with Caspian Oilfield Services (COS) to prolong appraisal drilling operations through the end of 2027. These operations involve deploying the "Neptune" jack-up rig to execute deep-offshore appraisal wells on the field's southern flank, targeting depths of 7,067 metres, which represents the deepest well program in the history of the asset.

== Reserves ==
SOCAR leadership estimates that with further drilling, the overall reserves at Umid are likely to reach 300 bcm while those of the Babek field lying under Umid will reach 600 bcm. Drilling at Babek will also be done by SOCAR. The Azerbaijan's total gas reserves are estimated at 3 to 5 trillion cubic meters (tcm). The discovery will boost Azerbaijan's potential as gas exporter to Western countries through the European evacuation route, i.e. Trans-Adriatic pipeline or Nabucco West pipeline.

== See also ==
- Azeri–Chirag–Gunashli
- Shah Deniz gas field
- Shafag-Asiman gas field
- Nakhchivan field
