= Shallow Water Absheron Peninsula =

Oil field near Absheron Peninsula, Azerbaijan

- Country: Azerbaijan
- Region: Caspian Basin
- Offshore/onshore: offshore
- Operator: BP
- Partners: BP (25%), Lukoil (25%), SOCAR (50%)

Shallow Water Absheron Peninsula (SWAP) is a prospective exploration area around the Absheron Peninsula in Azerbaijan. On 22 December 2014, SOCAR and BP signed a production sharing agreement on the joint exploration and development of potential prospects in the shallow water area around the Absheron peninsula. The contract was ratified by the Azerbaijani parliament on 14 April 2015.

The PSA contract area covers 1,900 km^{2} and stretches along the margins of the Caspian basin to the south of the Absheron peninsula. The acreage features water depths of up to 40 metres with potential reservoir depths of 3,000-5,000 metres. The development term is 23 years with possible extension.
