= Adnan Ahmadzada =

Azerbaijani businessman

- Born: 24 January 1978 (age 48); Baku, Azerbaijan SSR, USSR
- Education: The Academy of Public Administration under the President of the Republic of Azerbaijan; Western University
- Awards

Adnan Azer oglu Ahmadzada (Azerbaijani: Adnan Azər oğlu Əhmədzadə; born 1978) is an Azerbaijani businessman. He is a former deputy vice president of the State Oil Company of the Republic of Azerbaijan (SOCAR) on investments and marketing.

== Early life and education ==
Ahmadzada was born in 1978 in Baku, Azerbaijan. In 1998, he graduated from the Academy of Public Administration. He received a master's degree two years later from the Western University of Azerbaijan.

== Career ==
In 1998–2005, Ahmadzada worked in the Department of Foreign Economic Relations (since 2003, the Department of Marketing and Economic Operations) of SOCAR as an expert in the Department of Export Operations. From 2005 to 2006 he worked as the General Director of Azertrans LLC. From 2006–2019, he held the following positions in the Marketing and Economic Operations Department of SOCAR: deputy head of the Transport and Expedition Department (2006–2007), head of the Department of Commercial risks in trading operations (2007–2008), deputy chief of the Department of Economic Operations (2008–2010), general manager of SOCAR Marketing and Economic Operations Department (2010–2019). In 2018, he was appointed as executive director of SOCAR Trading.

In 2019, he was appointed as deputy vice-president of SOCAR on investments and marketing. He left SOCAR in 2023, then established ABDA Invest Holding. As of 2024, he was the owner of Oilmar, a marine fuel trading company based in Dubai.

On September 11, 2025, Ahmedzada was arrested and placed in pre-trial detention for four months on charges of sabotage against economic security, abuse of official authority, and large-scale embezzlement. Media reports linked his arrest to the contamination of Azerbaijani Azeri Light crude oil with chlorides, as well as to alleged ties with Russia. After the arrest, Oilmar conducted a management buy-out to transfer ownership from Ahmadzada to its management team.

On January 13, 2026, Ahmadzada's detention was extended.

== Honours ==
Ahmadzada has been the honorary President of Azerbaijan Koshiki Karate-do Federation since 2023. In September 2015, by order of the President of the Republic of Azerbaijan, he was awarded the Tereggi medal for his services in the development of the oil industry of Azerbaijan.
