= Shafag-Asiman gas field =

Geological structures in the Caspian Sea

Shafag-Asiman
- Country: Azerbaijan
- Region: Caspian Basin
- Location: 125km southeast of Baku
- Block: Shafag-Asiman
- Offshore/onshore: offshore
- Operator: BP
- Partners: BP (35%), SOCAR (35%), TPAO (30%)

Field history
- Discovery: 2009
- Start of development: 2023

Production
- Estimated gas in place: 500×10^{9} m^{3} (18×10^{12} cu ft)

Shafag-Asiman (Azerbaijani: Şəfəq və Asiman) is a large complex of offshore geological structures in the Caspian Sea located 125 km (78 mi) southeast of Baku, Azerbaijan. The Shafag and Asiman structures have been previously called D8 and D10, respectively.

== History ==
The memorandum of understanding (MOU) for exploring the Shafag-Asiman structures was signed on July 13, 2009. According to the initial agreement, the offshore block will be jointly developed by BP and State Oil Company of Azerbaijan Republic (SOCAR). The MOU was signed by the President of SOCAR, Rovnag Abdullayev and Chief Executive of Exploration and Production of BP, Andy Inglis in the presence of President of Azerbaijan, Ilham Aliyev and former Prime Minister of the United Kingdom, Gordon Brown. The MOU was followed by signing of Heads of Agreement on basic commercial principles on joint exploration and development of the fields by Rovnag Abdullayev and President of BP Azerbaijan, Rashid Javanshir, on July 6, 2010, during the visit of the President of BP, Tony Hayward, to Azerbaijan. The production sharing agreement for development and exploration of Shafag-Asiman block covers a period of thirty years with potential extension of up to five more years. The first two exploration wells will be drilled within the next four years with possible extension of exploration works for three more years. All costs for exploration works will be covered by BP. Development of the Shafag-Asiman block is considered by some as extension of Azeri-Chirag-Guneshli (ACG) project, operated by BP. The first exploration well was spudded on the 13th January 2020 with completion of drilling in March of 2021. The Turkish Petroleum Corporation(TPAO) the production sharing agreement with a 30% share in 2025, reducing BP and SOCAR share to 35% each.

== Reservoir ==
The offshore block covers an area of nearly 1,100 square kilometres (420 sq mi) which have never been explored before. The fields are located in a deepwater section of close to 650 to 800 metres (2,130 to 2,620 ft) with a reservoir depth of about 7,000 metres (23,000 ft). The initial reserves are estimated to be about 500 billion cubic meters of gas and 65 million tons of condensate. The 2D geophysical surveys previously conducted at block indicate that these deeply laying structures may contain big amounts of gas. The 3D-seismic study in three stages was carried out by Caspian Geophysical under BP contract. The first phase was completed in 2012; the second data processing phase in 2015 and the third data interpretation phase in the first half of 2023.

== See also ==
- Azeri–Chirag–Gunashli
- Shah Deniz gas field
- Umid gas field
