= BakuBus =

Bus company operating in the Baku metro area of Azerbaijan

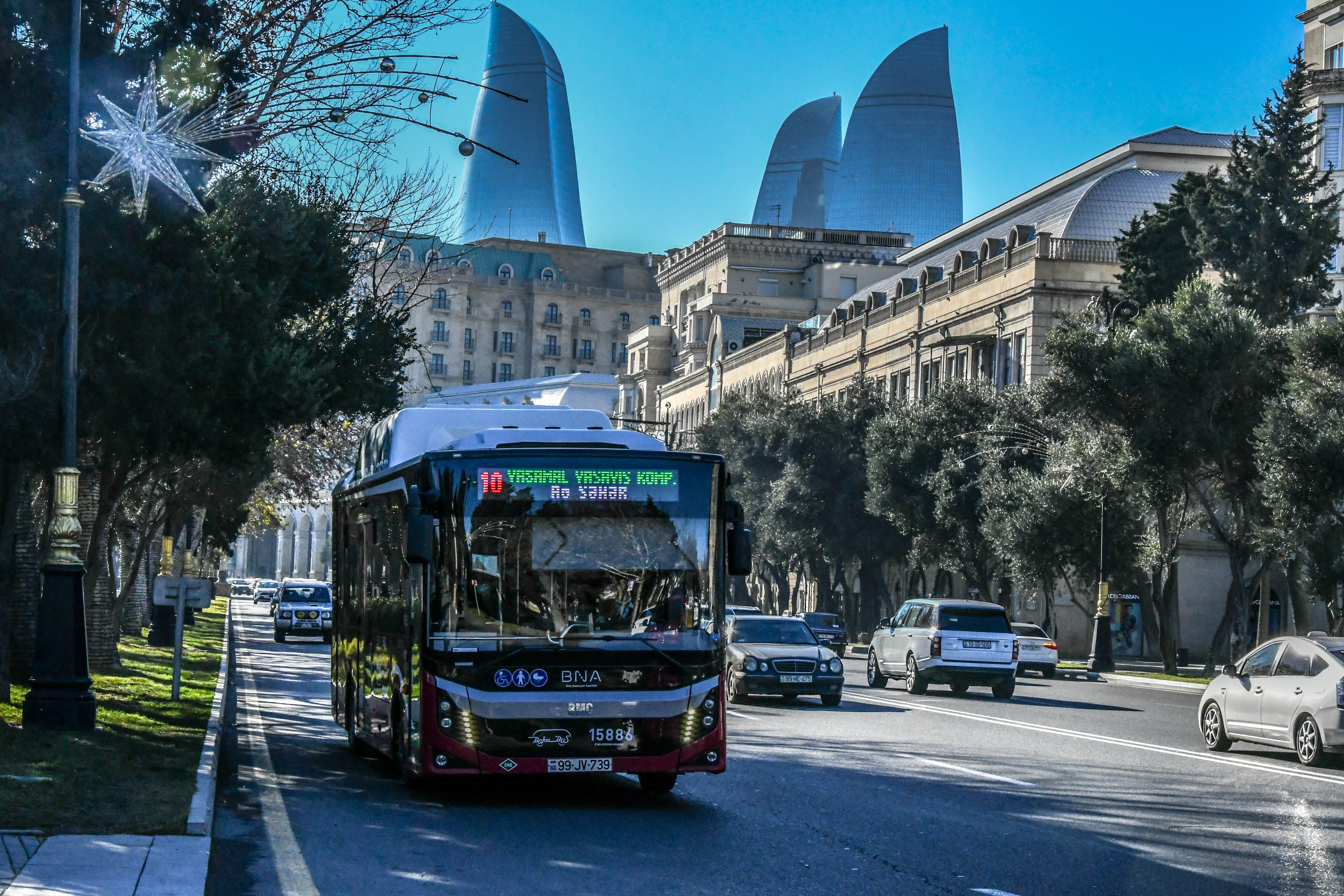
BakuBus

BakuBus is a company in the capital of Azerbaijan providing Baku city with an upgraded bus network. BakuBus LLC was founded on April 3, 2014, to provide passenger transport services in Baku city. Since November, 2024 it became part of Parent Company AZCON Holding. It offers passengers free Wi-Fi.

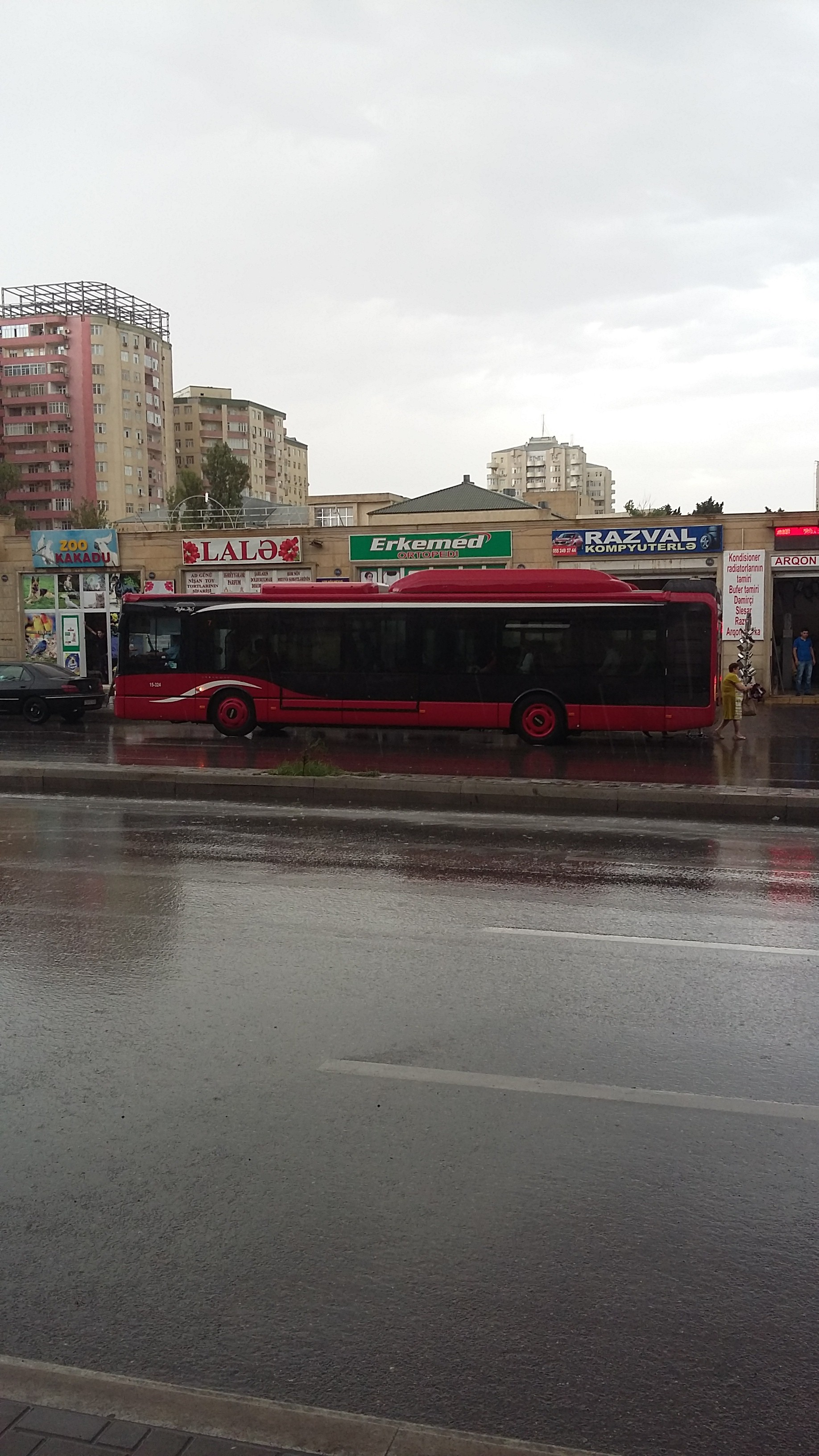

Also BakuBus LLC operates intra-city and suburban bus routes in Ganja city.

Baku's public transport operator, BakuBus LLC, is actively expanding into Nakhchivan in 2025.

Intra-city buses start operating in Khankendi. 24 April 2026— Bus number 1 “Karabakh University Clinic – Khankendi Sewing Factory”;. Bus number 2 “Karkijahan settlement – Railway and Bus Station.

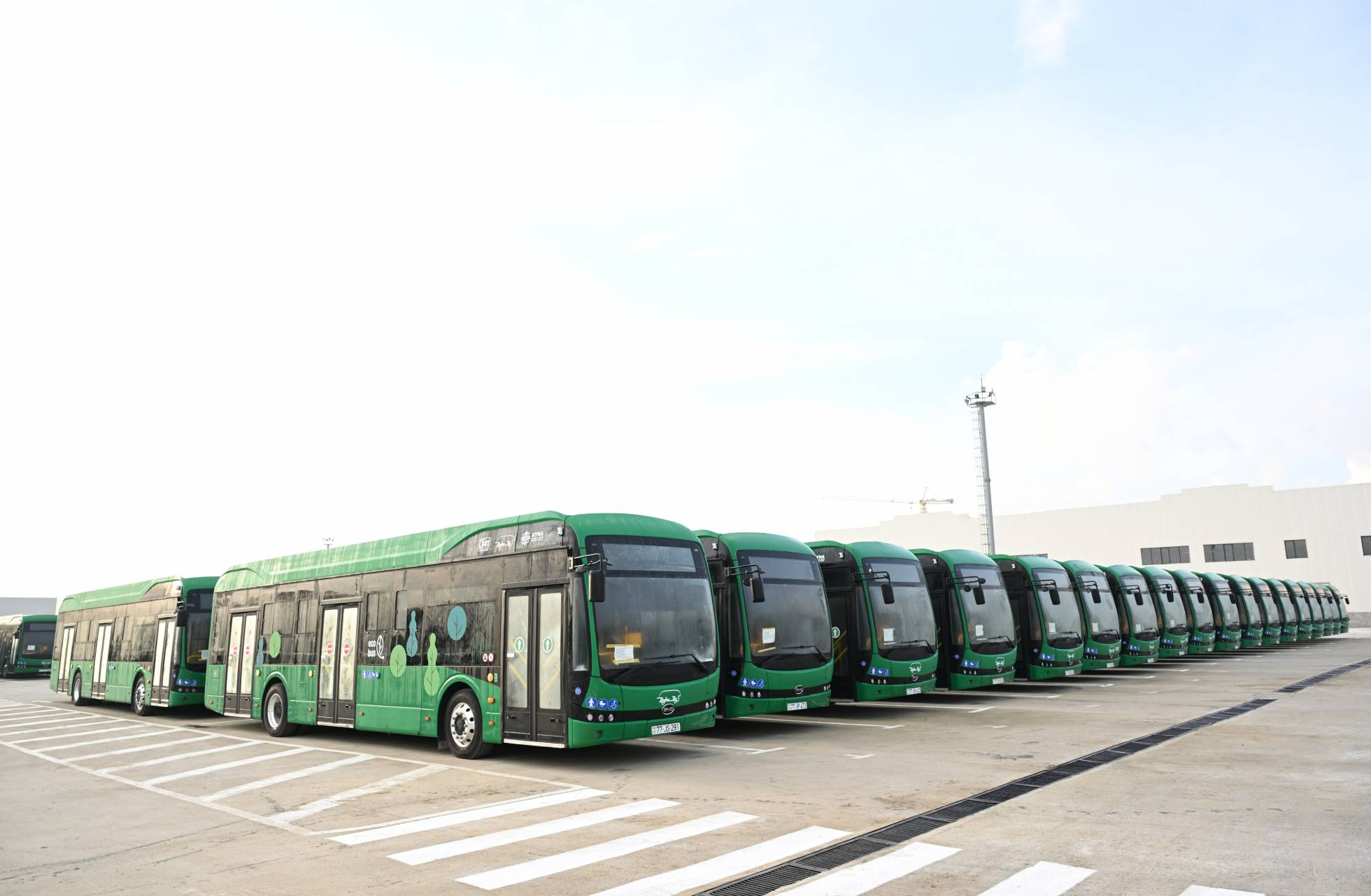
BYD Electric Baku Buses assembled in Sumgait, Azerbaijan

.

== See also ==
- Baku Metro
- BakuCard
- Transport in Azerbaijan
