= Gunashli Platform No.10 fire =

Azerbaijani oil platform fire

Gunashli Platform No. 10 fire
- Date: 4 December 2015
- Time: 17:40 local time
- Location: Azerbaijani section of Caspian Sea
- Cause: Damaged gas riser due to heavy storm
- Deaths: 12
- Injuries: 31
- Missing: 18 (as of December 2017)

On 4 December 2015, a deadly fire broke out in the northern part of platform No. 10 at the western section of the Gunashli oilfield operated by SOCAR in the Caspian Sea. The fire started, according to SOCAR, when a high-pressure subsea gas pipeline was damaged in a heavy storm. As a result of the fire, the platform, which had been in service since 1984, partially collapsed. Fire spread to several oil and gas wells. Production at all 28 wells (24 oil wells and 4 gas wells) connected to the platform was suspended, pipelines connecting the platform to the shore were closed, and electricity to the platform was cut off. Before the incident, the platform produced 920 tonnes of oil and 1.08 million cubic metres (38 million cubic feet) of gas per day. About 60% of the oil produced by SOCAR was transported through this platform.

At the time of the incident, 63 workers were on the platform. According to the Ministry of Emergency Situations of Azerbaijan, 12 workers are confirmed killed, 18 remained missing (as of December 2017), 33 were rescued; nine were hospitalized. According to SOCAR, workers went missing when a life boat with 34 people on board fell from the platform into the sea and was damaged after hitting piles of the platform. On 5 December, the Prosecutor General's Office launched a criminal investigation into the possible violation of fire safety rules. President of Azerbaijan Ilham Aliyev signed an Order declaring 6 December 2015 a day of mourning for those who died in the incident.
