= Azerbaijan Caspian Shipping Company =

Azerbaijani shipping company

Azərbaycan Xəzər Dəniz Gəmiçiliyi

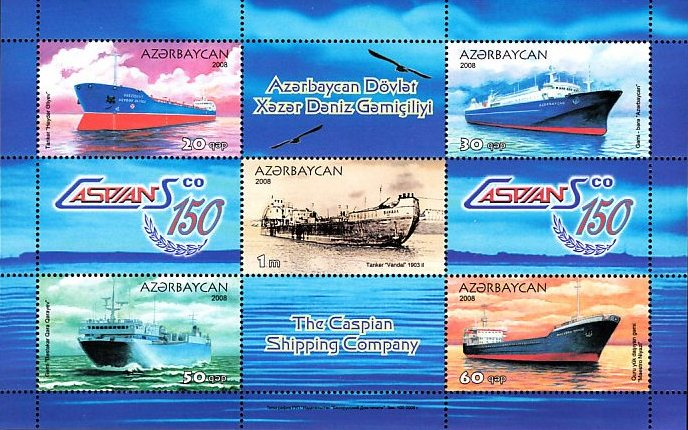
- Stamps dedicated to 150th anniversary of the Azerbaijan Caspian Shipping Company
- Industry: Shipping, Rail Transport / Passenger
- Founded: 1858
- Headquarters: Baku, Azerbaijan
- Area served: Caspian Sea, Black Sea, Mediterranean Sea, Marmara Sea and 3 Oceans
- Key people: Afgan Jalilov (Chairman)
- Revenue: $335.3m (2022)
- Number of employees: 7,003 (2020)
- Parent: (Parent Company AZCON Holding)
- Website: www.asco.az

Azerbaijan Caspian Shipping Closed Joint-Stock Company (Azerbaijani: Azərbaycan Xəzər Dəniz Gəmiçiliyi, Азәрбајҹан Хәзәр Дәниз Ҝәмичилији, abbreviated as AXDG/АХДҜ, [ɑːzærbɑjˈd͡ʒɑn ˈxæzær ˈdænis ɟæmit͡ʃiˈliji]) is a state-owned Azerbaijani shipping company. It is also known by its Russian-derived abbreviation CASPAR (from Russian: Каспийское пароходство).

The merchant fleet of the company consists of 98 vessels: 35 tankers, 15 ferries, 14 universal dry-cargo, 2 Ro-Ro and 35 different auxiliary ships. The offshore support fleet consists of 188 vessels, including 21 crane vessels, 22 supply and tug vessels, 29 passenger ships, 2 pipelay barges, 7 firefighting vessels, 5 geological survey vessels, 11 diving support vessels, and 84 other support vessels.

== History ==
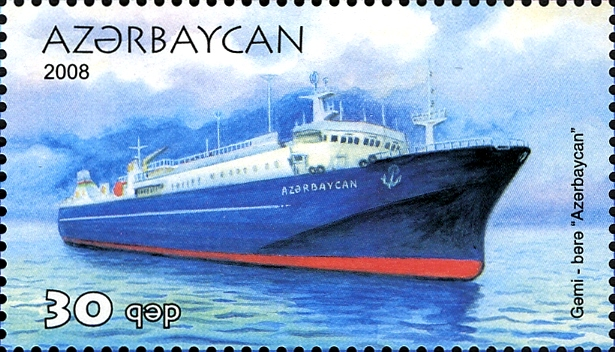
Stamps of Azerbaijan, 2008-Azerbaijan

The origins of the Caspian Shipping Company date back to 21 May 1858, with the establishment of The Caucasus and Mercury Joint-Stock Company in Baku.

On 6 June 1920, Nariman Narimanov, Chairman of the Council of People's Commissars of the Azerbaijan SSR, signed a decree nationalizing the Caspian merchant fleet. At the time, the public fleet comprised 390 vessels of various tonnage, including 106 sailships. On 1 October 1923, the Public Joint-Stock Caspian Shipping Company was formally established.

By presidential decree dated 22 October 2013, Azerbaijan's two major fleets—the Azerbaijan State Caspian Sea Shipping Company and the Caspian Sea Oil Fleet of the State Oil Company of Azerbaijan Republic—were merged to form the Azerbaijan Caspian Shipping Closed Joint-Stock Company.

== International Maritime Organization ==
Since 1995, Azerbaijan has been a member of the International Maritime Organization (IMO), the United Nations agency responsible for the safety, security, and environmental performance of international shipping.

In January 2000, the Azerbaijan State Marine Academy was listed in the IMO's catalog of maritime training institutions under the registration number 012.

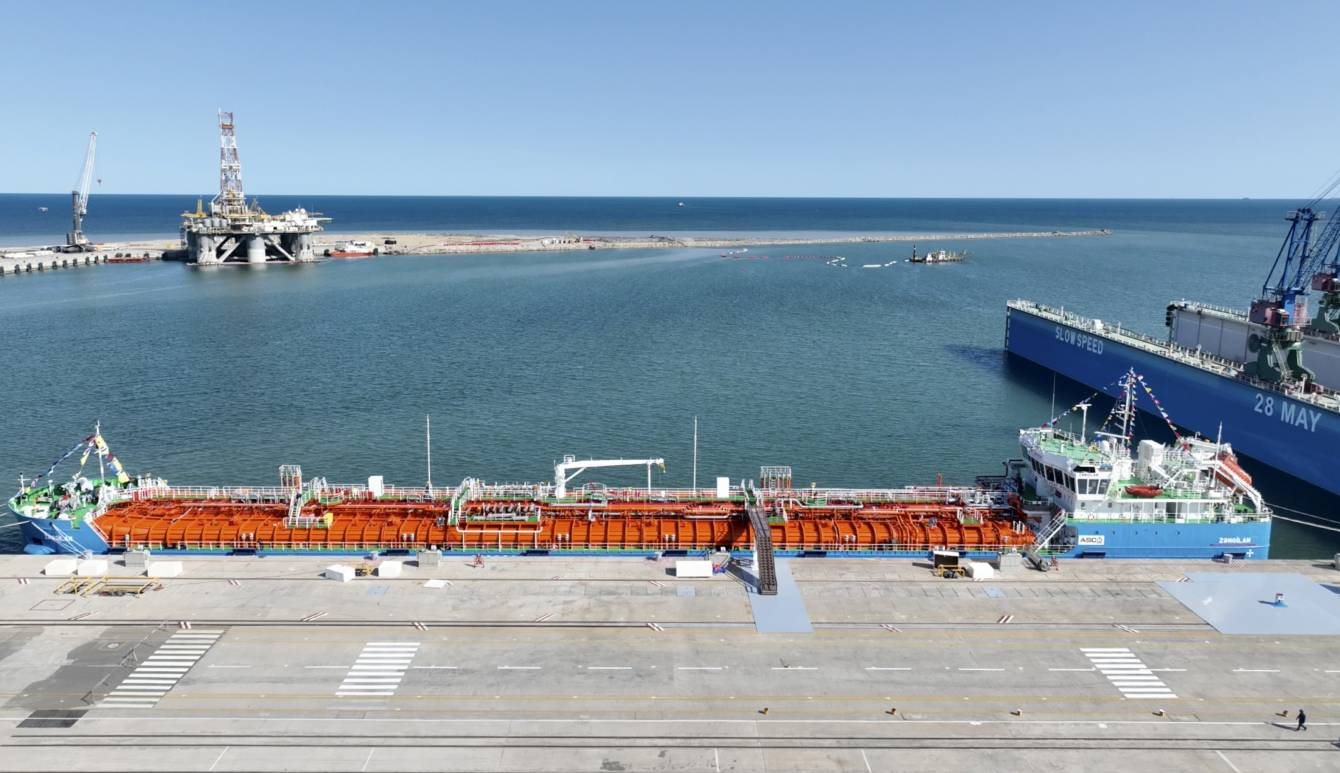
"Zangilan" tanker July, 2 2024

== Ferry fleet ==
The company operates a fleet of ferries, including the following vessels:

- Balakan
- Barda
- Nakhchivan
- Karabakh
- Shahdag
- Academician Hasan Aliyev
- Professor Gul
- Merkuri-1
- Academician Topchubashov
- Sheki
- Aghdam
- Ordubad
- Dagestan
- Azerbaijan
- Zarifa Aliyeva

== Operations ==
The company's activities include cargo transportation, passenger services, and maritime transport support for oil extraction companies. Principal ferry routes for cargo and passenger services connect Baku (Alyat) with Turkmenbashi in Turkmenistan, and Baku (Alyat) with Aktau (Kuryk) in Kazakhstan. The Baku–Turkmenbashi route facilitates transport across the Caspian Sea. The Azerbaijan Caspian Shipping Company manages operations on the Azerbaijani side, while the CJSC Marine Merchant Fleet operates on the Turkmen side.

== Sources ==
- Frappi, Carlo; Garibov, Azad, eds. (2014). The Caspian Sea Chessboard: Geo-Political, Geo-Strategic And Geo-Economic Analysis. EGEA.
- Maher, Joanne, ed. (2004). Europa World Year. Vol. I. Taylor & Francis Group.655
