= Umid Babek Operating Company =

Azerbaijani offshore oil and gas operating company

UBOC
- Native name: Umid Babek Operating Company
- Type: Private
- Industry: Oil and gas
- Founded: 2017
- Area served: Azerbaijan
- Key people: Elkhan Bashirov (Director of Branch Office)
- Products: Natural gas and condensate

UBOC, officially Umid Babek Operating Company, is an offshore oil and gas operating company involved through its Branch Office in the Republic of Azerbaijan in the exploration and development of the Umid gas-condensate field and the Babek prospective structure in the Caspian Sea.

== Operations ==
UBOC's operations are located approximately 75 kilometres south-east of Baku, focusing on offshore drilling, subsea well intervention, and infrastructure management.

=== Umid field ===
The Umid field holds estimated recoverable reserves of 200 billion cubic metres of natural gas and 40 million tonnes of gas condensate. As the first gas condensate field in the Caspian Region discovered and explored during the country’s independence period with internal sources of SOCAR, the Umid-Babek project plays an important role in regulating and maintaining the country's energy balance.

Production infrastructure includes offshore operating platforms equipped with Liebherr cranes and the Dashgil-2 onshore processing terminal. Given current limitations of the transportation lines, three million cubic metres of gas and 470 tonnes of gas condensate are produced daily from the Umid field and then transported via the existing Dashgil terminal to the Sangachal Head Facilities (SHF) using SOCAR’s infrastructure network.

Subsea appraisal drilling at the Umid field is scheduled to extend through 2027 using the "Neptune" jack-up rig, targeting depths exceeding 7,000 metres. In March 2026, the company successfully completed its latest deep offshore well in the region. Drilling operations in the Umid field, which is a high-pressure (~15,000 psi) gas and gas-condensate field with an average well depth of 6,500 m MD, are executed in a complex geological environment.

=== Babek structure ===
The Babek structure is estimated to contain up to 400 billion cubic metres of gas and 80 million tonnes of condensate.

For the Babek structure's exploration, UBOC executed a high-pressure, high-temperature (HPHT) drilling program at the BX-01 well. The company utilized a 15,000 psi subsea riser system supplied by Aquaterra Energy, marking the first time a subsea well in the Caspian region was engineered to be drilled from a jack-up rig in 62-metre water depths.

== See also ==
- Energy in Azerbaijan
- Southern Gas Corridor
