= BakıKART =

Proximity smart card system for public transit in Baku, Azerbaijan

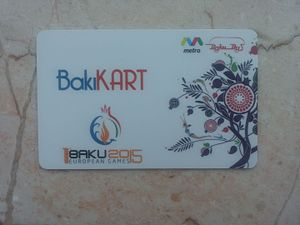
BakuCard

BakıKART is an electronic payment card designed to meet the demands of public transportation passengers in Baku, Azerbaijan, beginning in August 2015. The card can be used on Baku Metro and BakuBus lines.

== History ==
Until March 1, 2006, Baku Metro accepted tokens as payment for metro rides. In 2007, only RFID "Metro Cards" were used to pay for subway rides. The Metro Card, which cost 2 manats, was only available to pay for Baku Metro. On August 8, 2015, the Metro Card was replaced by BakıKART. During this time, Metro Card balances and initial values could be transferred to BakıKART.

== Overview ==
BakıKART is applied to pay the subway and bus fare on BakuBus lines. Two types of cards are used in a single system:

- BakıKART (Plastic card).
- BakıKART with limited access (Paper card). Valid for 45 days.

Both cards can be purchased at BakuCard terminals at Baku Metro stations, press kiosks, bus stops and other points with the BakıKART logo. BakıKART balance can be replenished using 10, 20, and 50 gapik coins, and 1, 5, 10, 20, 50, and 100 manat banknotes at terminals.

=== BakıKART Plastic Card ===
Card cost is non-refundable. Bus fares vary based on distance, according to Decision #7 of the Tariff Council of the Republic of Azerbaijan (30 July 2018).

At terminals, plastic cards can be refilled. They are intended for passengers who use public transportation regularly.

=== BakıKART Paper card ===
A card costs 0.50 AZN and is non-refundable. Paper cards cannot be refilled at terminals and are only available in increments of one, two, three, or four passes. These cards are intended for Baku City visitors and residents who rarely use public transportation.

== See also ==
- List of cities in Azerbaijan
- Transport in Azerbaijan
- Baku Metro
- List of Baku Metro stations
- BakuBus
