= AGC Aerospace & Defense =

Aerospace Company

AGC Aerospace & Defense is the portfolio brand of Acorn Growth Companies, an operationally focused, middle market private equity firm investing exclusively in aerospace and defense opportunities.

AGC Aerospace & Defense, through its portfolio of companies, has become a global supplier of technologies, systems and services supporting commercial and military programs. Capabilities within the portfolio range from financing, engineering, and integration services to manufacturing, logistics, and aircraft modifications. AGC Aerospace & Defense is organized into four operating groups: AeroComposites, Finance, Integrated Defense, and Services.

All the companies were aligned under the AGC Aerospace and Defense umbrella in 2009. The companies support DoD directly or as subcontractors to OEMs or Tier 1 defense contractors.

== Awards and recognition ==
In early 2010, Veracity Technology Solutions received the Aviation Week MRO of the Year award from Aviation Week. The Oklahoma Technology Counsel profiled Veracity's non-destructive inspection (NDI) / non-destructive testing (NDT) solutions. In the spring of 2010, Valair Aviation was featured by a local news channel regarding their aircraft upgrade capabilities.

== Acorn Growth Companies ==
Acorn Growth Companies is an operationally focused, middle market private equity firm investing exclusively in aerospace and defense.

== Portfolio ==
The firm operates its portfolio of companies under AGC Aerospace & Defense, a global supplier of technologies, systems and services supporting commercial and military programs. Capabilities within the portfolio range from financing, engineering, and integration services to manufacturing, logistics, and aircraft modifications.

All the companies were aligned under the AGC Aerospace and Defense umbrella in 2009. The companies support DoD directly or as subcontractors to OEMs or Tier 1 defense contractors.

== Acquisitions ==
- Paul Fabrications (Paul Fabs, Now AGC AeroComposites Derby)
- Hill AeroSystems Inc. (Formerly Hill AeroSpace, Hill Stamping)
- Commuter Air Technology (CAT)
- Aerospace Products S.E. (APSE)
- Unitech Composites and Structures (Now AGC AeroComposites)
- Valair Aviation
- Integrated Composites, Inc. (Now AGC AeroComposites)
- Valair - Kirkpatrick Aviation
- Aerospheres (UK) Ltd
- Tods Composite Solutions (Now AGC AeroComposites)

=== Start-ups and new ventures ===
- Veracity Technology Solutions
- SinglePoint Financial
- Aircraft Logistics Group (ALG)

== Locations ==
- Derby, UK
- Portland, UK
- Yeovil, UK
- Harrow, UK
- Hayden, Idaho
- Washington, D.C.
- Oklahoma City, Oklahoma
- Tulsa, Oklahoma
- Salt Lake City
- Huntsville, Alabama
