= Caspian International Petroleum Company =

Caspian International Petroleum Company (CIPCO; Azerbaijani: Xəzər Beynəlxalq Neft Şirkəti) was a joint operating company established by production shareholding companies for exploration, development and production sharing of the Karabakh field in the section of the Caspian Sea within Azerbaijan.

== History ==
It was incorporated on 4 June 1996. The company was led by President James A. Tilley, who had been the President of Pennzoil Caspian.

Shareholders of CIPCO had the following stakes in Karabakh field:

Company	Interest
LUKAgip JV	45%
Pennzoil	30%
LUKOIL	12.5%
SOCAR	7.5%
Agip	5%

=== Feasibility studies ===
The company estimated an investment of up to $2 billion, if the feasibility studies proved the expectations for reserves. CIPCO spent nearly $100 million on feasibility studies.

Closure

In January 1999, the consortium management announced the project was not commercially feasible and as of 23 February 1999, it stopped its operations and was dissolved.

== See also ==
- Azeri-Chirag-Guneshli — Caspian Sea oil fields.
- Karabakh (Oil and Gas field) — Caspian Sea oil field.
- Sangachal Terminal — natural gas processing and oil production plant on the coast of the Caspian Sea.
- Oil and gas companies of Azerbaijan
- Petroleum in Azerbaijan
