= Assembly of the Friends of Azerbaijan =

The Assembly of the Friends of Azerbaijan (AFAZ) is a non-profit organization based in Houston, Texas, incorporated in 2012 to promote Azerbaijans economic potential, and to encourage trade and investment between it and the United States. The country's largest energy company, SOCAR, State Oil Company of the Azerbaijan Republic used AFAZ as a conduit to fund a 2013 energy conference for high-level former White House officials and members of Congress which was reviewed by the Office of Congressional Ethics.

== Goals ==
The Assembly of the Friends of Azerbaijan (AFAZ) describes itself as an "educational, cultural, business, congressional advocacy and charitable organization...to build bridges between the United States and Azerbaijan". Its 19 mission statements are clear: "Encouraging trade and investment" and "encouraging the development of social and business relationships and cooperation among organizations, enterprises and individuals in the United States and Azerbaijan" and "promoting Azerbaijan’s economic potential".

== Organization ==
As of 2015, the AFAZ website contained no information about the Board of Directors or staff ("information coming soon"). The US-Azerbaijan Convention was an annual meeting in celebration of the two decades of strengthening relations and deepening strategic partnership between the US and Azerbaijan. On May 28–29, 2013, Baku hosted the “Azerbaijan-US: Vision for Future” convention in Baku, attended by State and Government Officials, Azerbaijani parliamentarians, US congressmen, ministers of the two countries` ministers, experts and journalists. In 2013, AFAZ sponsored this one program and declared nearly all of its funding as coming from this event. Kemal Oksuz has been described as "an executive in charge", a Houston businessman, who runs another non profit organization, the Turquoise Council of Americans and Eurasians out of the same office tower in the Uptown District and "has been active for years in several nonprofits of the so-called Gülen movement, [...] a loose network of Turkic-American organizations".

== Lobbying ==
AFAZ was one of two Houston-based non profit organizations, which financed a 2013 visit of more than 40 high-level former White House officials, members of Congress and state officials to Baku upon invitation of the State Oil Company of the Azerbaijan Republic (SOCAR). No such information surfaced in 2013, when the Washington Post, and Politico reported and The Washington Diplomat wrote with particular detail about the "conference" at the time. In 2014, the Houston Chronicle first wrote about ethics questions resulting in, for example, former US Senator Richard Lugar urging U.S. Congress "to exempt a natural gas field in the Caspian Sea from economic sanctions against Iran".

In 2015 the Washington Post cited a confidential report by the Office of Congressional Ethics that the state oil company SOCAR had transferred $750,000 to an AFAZ bank account in May 2013, and that AFAZ and the other Houston-based nonprofit, Turquoise Council of Americans and Eurasians (TCAE), used as the source of funding.” The 70-page OCE report is not yet public because the House Ethics Committee started its own investigation.

== Projects ==
New Mexico State University (NMSU) and AFAZ have signed an affiliation agreement to strengthen their academic links and cooperation between both institutions.
