= State Maritime Agency (Azerbaijan) =

State Maritime and Port Agency
- Azərbaycan Respublikasının Dövlət Dəniz və Liman Agentliyi
- Coat of Arms of Azerbaijan

Agency overview
- Formed: April 21, 2006
- Headquarters: Baku, Republic of Azerbaijan
- Agency executive: Arif Mammadov, Chairman of the Board
- Website: www.ardda.gov.az

The State Maritime and Port Agency under the Ministry of Digital Development and Transport (Azerbaijani: Azərbaycan Respublikasının Dövlət Dəniz və Liman Agentliyi) is a public legal entity within the Cabinet of Azerbaijan in charge of regulating activities in the maritime sector of the Republic of Azerbaijan.

== History ==
The State Maritime Administration was established by the Presidential Decree No. 697 on April 21, 2006. It is a member of International Maritime Organization and regularly attends the conferences dedicated to maritime security. The agency also establishes cooperation with other countries with maritime boundaries. According to the decree of the President of the Republic of Azerbaijan dated January 12, 2018 “On some measures to improve management in the field of transport, communications and high technologies in the Republic of Azerbaijan”, the Administration became part of the Ministry of Transport, Communications and High Technologies of the Republic of Azerbaijan. It is operating as the State Maritime Agency under the Ministry. The agency is responsible for maritime transportation within the borders of the Republic of Azerbaijan.

== Structure ==
The agency is headed by its chief. The main functions of the administration include safety of maritime navigation; servicing of waterways and channels within the Republic of Azerbaijan; management of movement of ships; investigations of accidents in the sea; drafting of legislations related to maritime sector and immediate control over their implementation; protection of marine environment; control over navigational aids and systems; ensuring search and rescue at sea; registration of vessels; maritime training of personnel; supervising security assurance at sea; implementation of hydrographic services; surveying and certification of sea port facilities. The head of the State Maritime Administration and deputies are appointed to their positions by the Decree of the President of the Republic of Azerbaijan. The staff of Administration consists of 48 people who are mainly qualified specialists with experience in this field. Additionally, the agency comprises the crew department, law, human resources and international relations department, ship registration and control on ship standards department, and transport and technical maintenance office.

The agency consists of the Personnel, International Relations and Law Department, Crew Service Department, Diploma and Certification, Passport Offices, Maritime Inspection, Technical Service, and General Departments

== International relations ==
During 2011, the Administration built relationships with related state organizations of Greece, Russia, Kazakhstan and Poland as the result of agreements between the mentioned states and the Republic of Azerbaijan.

With a Memorandum of Cooperation with the Ministry of Oceans and Fisheries of Korea, which was approved by a presidential decree, SMA started to collaborate with this organization for the purpose of mutual goals.

The similar agreement was signed with Turkey to improve maritime relations and ensure overcoming safety problems in this field.

On August 8, 2017, according to an agreement between the Government of the Republic of Azerbaijan and the Government of Turkmenistan for the purpose of developing maritime trade and strengthening economic ties with the two countries.

Furthermore, the Republic of Azerbaijan has been a member of the International Maritime Organization since May 15, 1995.

== Activities ==
The Administration is guided by the Constitution of the Republic of Azerbaijan, laws of the Republic of Azerbaijan, decrees and orders of the President of the Republic of Azerbaijan, and the Statute on the State Maritime Administration.

== See also ==
- Cabinet of Azerbaijan
- Caspian Sea
- Water bodies of Azerbaijan
