= SOCAR =

State-owned oil and gas company in Azerbaijan

State Oil Company of the Republic of Azerbaijan
- Trade name: SOCAR
- Native name: Azərbaycan Respublikası Dövlət Neft Şirkəti
- Type: State-owned
- Industry: Oil and gas
- Founded: 13 September 1992
- Founder: Abulfaz Elchibey
- Headquarters: Baku, Azerbaijan
- Area served: Europe & Asia
- Key people: Rovshan Najaf (president)
- Products: Petroleum; Natural gas; Fuels; Petrochemicals
- Services: Sales; Transportation; Service stations; Trading; Shipbuilding
- Revenue: ▲AZN 119,2 bn (2022)
- Operating income: ▲AZN 9.36 bn (2022)
- Net income: ▲AZN 9.4 bn (2022)
- Total assets: ▲AZN 80.8 bn (2022)
- Total equity: ▲AZN 33.3 bn (2022)
- Owner: Azerbaijani Government
- Number of employees: 100,000 (2018)
- Subsidiaries: BOS Shelf, AZFEN, Petkim, Star Refinery, Baku Shipyard LLC, Interfax Azerbaijan, Ateshgah Insurance, AzLAB, EKOL Engineering, Gruppo API, UBOC
- Website: www.socar.az,

The State Oil Company of the Republic of Azerbaijan (Azerbaijani: Azərbaycan Respublikası Dövlət Neft Şirkəti, ARDNŞ), largely known by its abbreviation SOCAR, is a fully state-owned national oil and gas company headquartered in Baku, Azerbaijan. The company produces oil and natural gas from onshore and offshore fields in the Azerbaijani segment of the Caspian Sea. It operates the country's only oil refinery, one gas processing plant and runs several oil and gas export pipelines throughout the country. It owns fuel filling station networks under the SOCAR brand in Azerbaijan, Turkey, Georgia, Ukraine, Romania, Switzerland, and Austria.

SOCAR is a major source of income for the authoritarian regime in Azerbaijan. The company is run in an opaque manner, as it has complex webs of contracts and middlemen that have led to the enrichment of the country's ruling elites.

== History ==
=== Soviet era ===
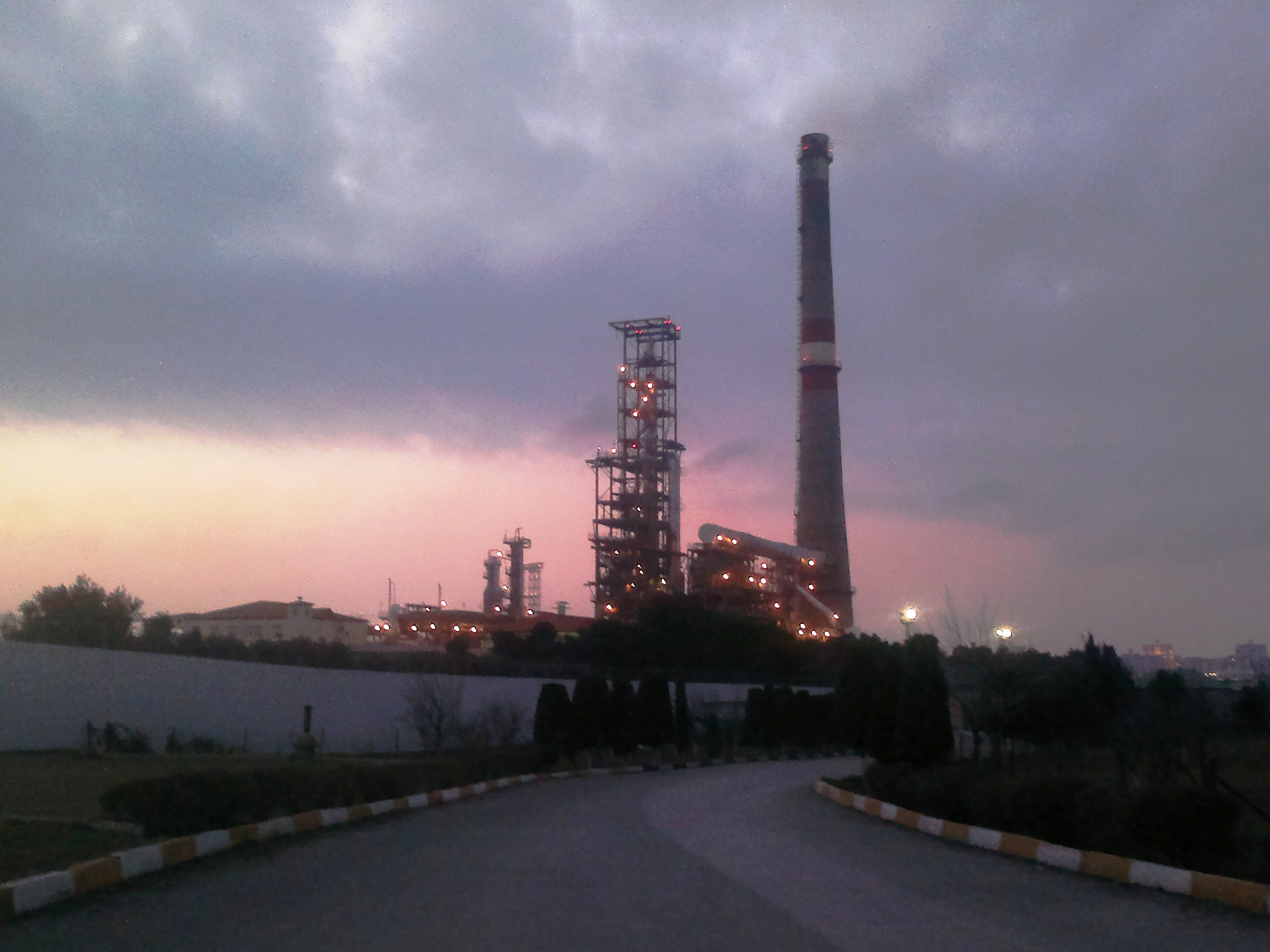
SOCAR’s Heydar Aliyev Baku Oil Refinery

Azneft, a business that integrated the Azerbaijani oil industry was created after the Bolshevik Revolution through the nationalization of the Azerbaijani oil industry. It was subordinate to different organizations in the former Soviet Union and the Azerbaijan Soviet Socialist Republic, depending on its organizations' characteristics at different times and was known as Azerneftkomite, Azerneftkombinat (later divided into the Azerneft, Azerneftzavodlar and Azerneftmashingayirma syndicates), and Azerneftchikharma syndicates, and so forth. In 1954–1959, the Ministry of the Oil Industry of the Azerbaijan SSR and in 1965–1970, the Ministry of Oil Production Industry of the Azerbaijan SSR were established on the basis of Azerneft. In August 1970, it was renamed back to Azerneft.

=== Post-independence ===
As the Republic of Azerbaijan gained independence, Azerineft State Concern was established on 3 December 1991. The State Oil Company of the Azerbaijan Republic (SOCAR) was created on 13 September 1992 by the merger of Azerbaijan's two state oil companies, Azerineft State Concern and Azerneftkimiya Production Association according to the decree of then president Abulfaz Elchibey. In 1994, the Onshore and Offshore Oil and Gas Production Association were established as part of the State Oil Company. In 2003, the Onshore and Offshore Oil and Gas Production Association were merged to form the Azneft Production Union.

On July 21, 2022, Rovshan Najaf was appointed as the President of SOCAR as based on the decree issued by Ilham Aliyev, the President of the Republic of Azerbaijan. In December 2005, the former head of the Baku Oil Refinery and a member of the Azerbaijani parliament, Rovnag Abdullayev, was appointed President of SOCAR. He replaced Natig Aliyev, who was named Azerbaijan's Minister of Industry and Energy. On the 21st of July 2022, Rovshan Najaf was appointed President of the State Oil Company of the Republic of Azerbaijan, SOCAR.

The Azerbaijan government adopted for a strategy in the 1990s to rev up oil exploration and deplete existing oil wells, with immediate economic gains. Victor Menaldo writes that recently independent Azerbaijan found "itself in a fragile and desperate situation after a war against Armenia, a huge banking crisis, and an economic collapse" and that "the government was left with no other option than to rev up oil exploration and hasten the depletion of extant wells, despite the fact that oil discoveries had peaked."

Menaldo wrote in 2016, "the days in which the Azerbaijani state can offset its underlying weakness by drilling its way out of trouble are numbered... Whether Azerbaijan can now transition to a more diversified economy is an open question." Thomas de Waal wrote in 2018, "Azerbaijan’s economy showed classic symptoms of “Dutch Disease,” the condition whereby heavy reliance on the export of one product—usually oil or gas—weakens the rest of the economy." According to De Waal, the oil wealth had enriched political and economic elites in Azerbaijan, along with underspending of the oil riches on long-term development.

In May 2026, it is announced that Krafton, a South Korean video game publisher and holding company became the third-largest shareholder in SOCAR, holding 13.44% in SOCAR. SOCAR and Krafton announced plans to establish Apex Mobility, an autonomous driving company valued at approximately 150 billion won, with the aim of gradually launching robotaxi and autonomous car-sharing services.

In October 2026, the international rating agency Sustainable Fitch maintained SOCAR's ESG rating at the level of "3", raising the company's assessment score from 41 to 43.

== Operations ==
=== Upstream operations ===
SOCAR's activities are exploration, preparation, exploitation of onshore and offshore oil and gas fields, transportation, processing, refining and sale of oil, gas, condensate and other related products. SOCAR's exploration activities cover the prospective offshore fields in the Azerbaijani sector of the Caspian Sea. The current largest fields being explored are Shafag-Asiman, which is explored with BP, and Absheron natural gas fields which are being explored together with BP and TotalEnergies respectively.

In 2010, SOCAR and BP signed a new production sharing agreement regarding Shafag-Asiman. In 2014, SOCAR and BP signed a joint exploration and development over the Shallow Water Absheron Peninsula. SOCAR has explored the Umid and Bulla Deniz gas fields. In 2017, SOCAR and a consortium led by BP signed a letter of intent for future development of the Azer-Chirag-Gunashli field. They signed a $6 billion contract regarding the Azeri Central East (ACE) platform on the Azeri-Chirag-Gunashli field.

In 2016, SOCAR produced 6.27 billion barrels (997,000,000 m^{3}) of gas. Azerbaijan has 57 oil fields, 18 of which are offshore, in the Azerbaijani sector of the Caspian Sea. The essential part of the company's revenue comes from the giant ACG oil field complex and Shah Deniz gas field. In September 1994, SOCAR entered into a Production sharing agreement (PSA) with the foreign oil companies led by BP for the 30-year development of the ACG oil field, which was later known as the Contract of the Century. Two years later Shah Deniz PSA was signed. As of 2014, SOCAR holds 11.6% of the ACG shares and 16.7% of the Shah Deniz shares. Moreover, SOCAR operates a number of onshore fields on its own which is the main source of the domestic supply. In 2013, 43.48 million tons (318.74 million barrels) of oil was produced in Azerbaijan, of which 8.31 million tons (60.95 million barrels) belong to SOCAR. In the same period, Azerbaijan's natural gas production reached record high of 29.46 billion cubic metre of which SOCAR shares constitute 7.14 billion cubic metre of it.

On 22 December 2023, after 30 years operating in the country’s oilfields, Norway based Equinor announced it was selling its assets in Azerbaijan to SOCAR. The sale includes an 8.7% interest in the Baku Tbilisi Ceychan pipeline, used to pump oil to Turkey’s Western coast, a 7.27% interest in the Azeri-Chirag-Gunashli oilfield, and a 50% stake in the Karabakh oilfield.

=== Pipeline operations ===
SOCAR has a share in two parallel-running major export pipelines of the country; Baku-Tbilisi-Ceyhan pipeline (BTC) and South Caucasus Pipeline (SCP).

Azerbaijan's major export pipelines

The pipelines deliver the ACG and Shah Deniz hydrocarbons from Sangachal Terminal located in 45 km south of Baku to Turkey and Europe. They pass through the borders of three countries: Azerbaijan, Georgia and Turkey. The share of SOCAR in the BTC and SCP is 25% and 16.7% respectively. In addition, SOCAR is the major shareholder with 58% ownership in the Trans-Anatolian gas pipeline (TANAP) and with 20% ownership in Trans Adriatic Pipeline (TAP) which are meant to transmit some 16 bcma of gas produced from the second phase of Shah Deniz gas field with 10 bcma of that going to Europe and 6 bcma to Turkey. The TAP is seen as a competitor to Russia's South Stream because of diversification of gas supplies to Europe. In February 2021, SOCAR's vice president for investment and marketing, Elshad Nasirov, stated that 20% of TANAP would be able to transport hydrogen to Europe without additional investments.

The company has stakes in the relatively low-capacity Baku-Supsa Pipeline and Baku-Novorossiysk Pipeline. The Azerbaijani part of the Baku-Novorossiysk Pipeline is operated by SOCAR, whereas Baku-Supsa Pipeline's operator is BP. Moreover, SOCAR operates Dubendi Oil Terminal in Azerbaijan and Kulevi Oil Terminal in Georgia, which are important for transportation and export.

An additional supply contract was signed in May 2021, with Russia's Rosneft, to start supplying Ukraine and other countries with oil products and LPG. This came about after Swiss trader Proton Energy suspended shipments of Russian diesel to the country that April. This is the first time since 2016 that another company will be supplying Rosneft products to Ukraine. According to BM Georgia, the supply agreement will provide SOCAR with an additional 100,000 tons of diesel fuel and 12,000 tons of LPG.

=== Refining operations ===
SOCAR has two oil refineries and one gas processing plant. Azerneftyagh Oil Refinery specializes in the production of fuels and oils, producing gasoline, kerosene and diesel distillates, various oils (industrial, motor, transformer etc.) and asphalt. All fuel distillates produced there are sent to Heydar Aliyev Baku Oil Refinery for redistillation. The refinery processes 21 out of 24 grades of the Azerbaijani crude. It meets the country's entire demand for petroleum products, and 45% of its petroleum products are exported. The Gas Processing Plant produces processed gas, liquified gas and natural gasoline. In 2010, the plant produced 4 bcm of processed gas, 24,800 tons of liquefied gas and 26,700 tons of natural gasoline.

Two subsidiaries of Maire Tecnimont S.p.A signed two EPCs with Heydar Aliyev Oil Refinery (HAOR) for its modernization and reconstruction in 2021. The one EPC is for the installation of a Fluid catalytic cracking (FCC) gasoline hydrotreating unit, and the other for the installation of an LPG mercaptan oxidation unit and an amine treatment and LPG pre-treatment unit. SOCAR and Axens signed licensing and design agreements for the FCC unit included in the HAOR modernisation project. With this, engineers will be provided with schooling related to the units, as well as specifically aiming to develop energy efficiency skills and sustainability.

=== Retail station operations ===
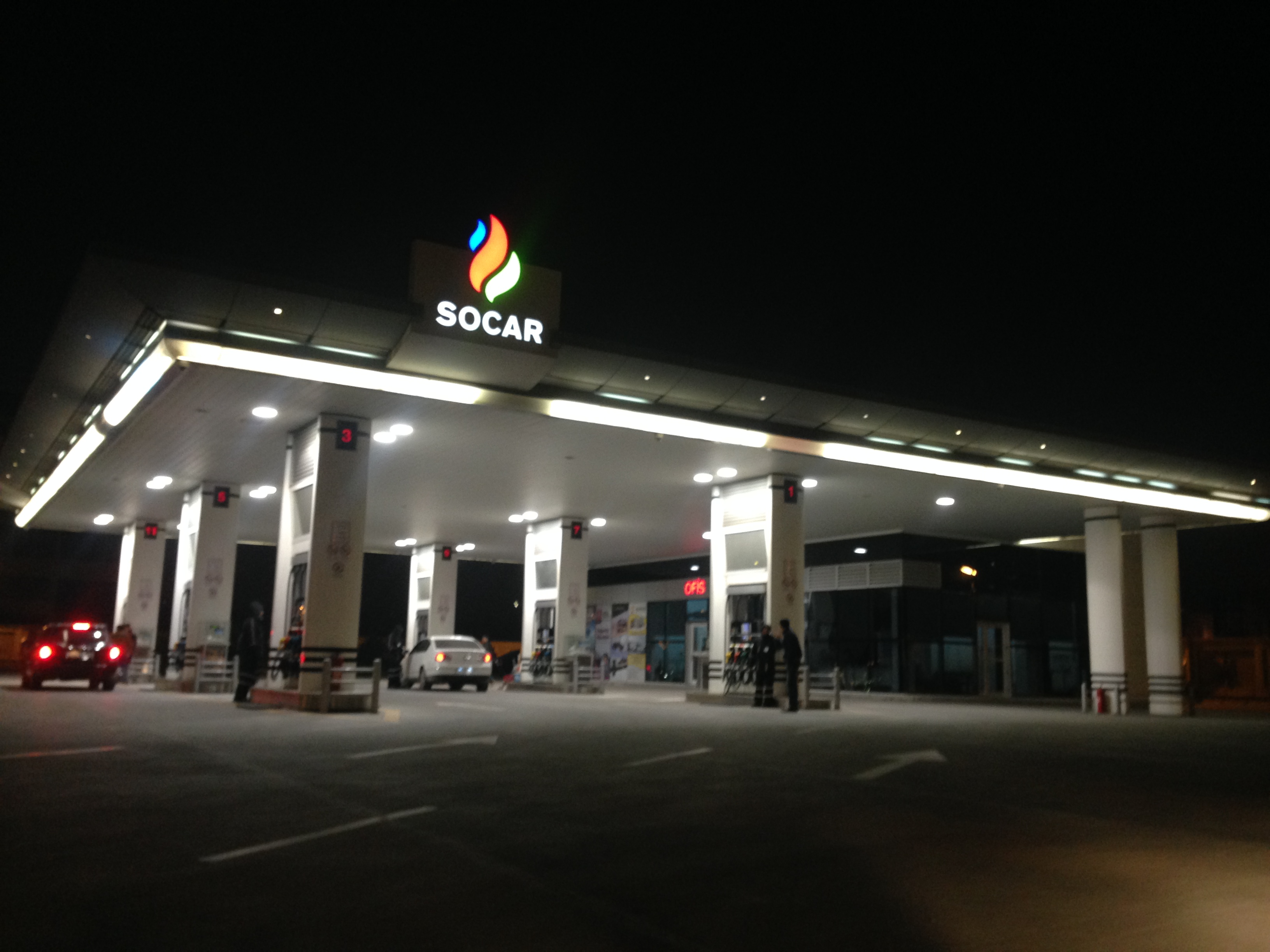
SOCAR fuel filling station on Babek Avenue, Baku, Azerbaijan

The first fuel station of the company under the brand name SOCAR was opened in neighboring Georgia in 2008, before any in its home country. The fuel stations in Georgia are operated by the subsidiary of the company SOCAR Georgia Petroleum. As of 2014, there were currently more than 110 filling stations in Georgia, making it the largest retail fuel station network of SOCAR. In Azerbaijan, the company operates a few (less than any other country where it operates) filling stations under the brand name SOCAR since 2010. It is the third-largest network of retail stations in Azerbaijan after Azpetrol and Lukoil. In 2011, the first retail station of SOCAR was opened in Ukraine. In October 2014, the number of the SOCAR stations in Ukraine reached 40.

In 2011, the company entered into the Romanian market, acquiring initially 90% and at a later stage, the rest 10% of the stake in Romtranspetrol. In September 2014, SOCAR launched its 30th filling station in Romania. In November 2011, SOCAR bought ExxonMobil's Swiss subsidiary Esso Schweiz for an undisclosed amount. Along with the acquisition, SOCAR became the owner of a network of more than 160 filling stations operating under the brand name Esso across the country. The first SOCAR premium fueling station in Switzerland after the rebranding was opened in September 2012 in Zürich. All the operations in Switzerland are managed and led by SOCAR Energy Switzerland.

In 2021, plans were announced that Alpiq, EW Hofe and SOCAR Energy Switzerland will be building an electrolysis plant in the Freienbach district, which is to produce 1,000 to 1,200 tons of emission-free mobility green hydrogen a year. The green hydrogen that is produced there will be transported in the pipelines of the former substation to the Fuchsberg motorway service station, where SOCAR will set up filling stations.

=== Other operations ===
In December 2007, SOCAR Trading was incorporated and became the marketing division of SOCAR. Headquartered in Geneva, SOCAR Trading offers ultra-low-sulfur-diesel, liquefied petroleum gas and markets SOCAR crude oil export volumes from Ceyhan, trades third-party crude and oil products and assists SOCAR with international investments in logistics, downstream and sales. Alongside its field of activity in marketing and sales, SOCAR Trading assists SOCAR in expanding SOCAR's assets as well.

Azerigaz Production Union (PU) has been carrying out transportation, distribution and sale of natural gas in the territory of the Republic of Azerbaijan. The Union has also been ensuring transportation of natural gas produced by SOCAR to the Islamic Republic of Iran, Georgia and the Russian Federation.

The main directions of SOCAR Georgia Gas activity comprise import into the Georgian market and sale of natural gas, as well as construction and rehabilitation of gas pipelines. In 2010, the company was honoured with 'Best Company of the year' for active participation in the 'Gas provision of all villages' program of the Georgian President.

Baku Shipyard LLC joint venture was founded on 10 May 2011 under the laws of Republic of Azerbaijan, by the State Oil Company of Azerbaijan (SOCAR) owning 65%, Azerbaijan Investment Company (AIC) 25%, and Keppel Offshore Marine (KOM) 10%, has developed and put into operation the most modern shipbuilding and ship-repair facility in the Caspian Sea.

The opening ceremony of Star Oil Refinery was held on 19 October in İzmir, Turkey with the participation of Ilham Aliyev and Recep Tayyip Erdoğan. Since the beginning of the project, US$1 392.8 million has been allocated to finance the Azerbaijani share of the STAR project within the framework of the SOFAZ's budget execution.

On 15 July 2021, SOCAR signed a cooperation agreement with Technip Energies involving a joint pilot project to produce offshore energy on a floating wind turbine. Back in April of the same year, Azerbaijan had signed a memorandum of understanding with the International Finance Corporation (IFC) in order to cooperate on offshore wind development. The cooperation between the two companies is to determine the potential of the countries offshore wind possibilities.

On May 16, 2025, SOCAR Energy Switzerland, a subsidiary of the State Oil Company of the Azerbaijan Republic (SOCAR), commissioned Switzerland's first fast-charging station for electric trucks. The station, which is also SOCAR’s first of its kind, was officially opened at the Kölliken Nord refueling complex along Switzerland’s A1 motorway. The station is part of efforts to develop infrastructure for electric commercial vehicles in the country.

In June 2025, it was announced that SOCAR acquired a 10% stake in the Israeli Tamar gas field, which is worth an estimated $1.25 billion. On August 2, 2025 SOCAR signed an agreement with Turkey to deliver gas to Syria through the Kilis Aleppo pipeline.

In September 2025, an agreement between Gruppo API and SOCAR was made for SOCAR to acquire 99.82% of Gruppo API from the owning family. The acquisition, which is estimated to be valued at 3 billion euros, is twas completed in the second quarter of 2026.

In November 2025, SOCAR entered a memorandum of understanding (MuO) with Dragon Oil of the United Arab Emirates to explore opportunities for joint projects in the oil and gas sectors in the Caspian Sea basin.

== Locations ==
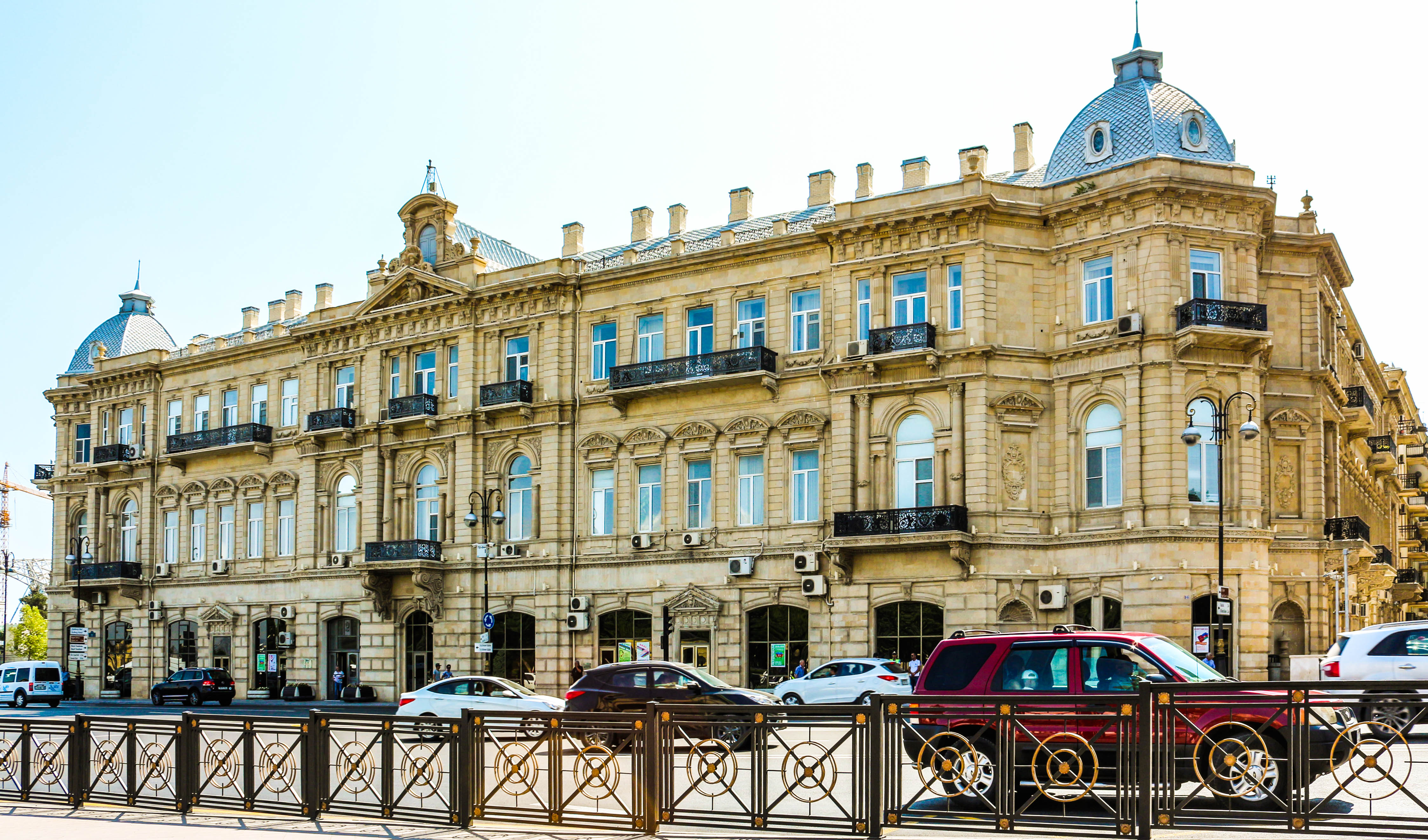
SOCAR's previous Head Office on Azneft Square in downtown Baku, named after historical "Azneft" ("AzOil") trust

SOCAR's headquarters are located in a 42-floor SOCAR Tower which was under construction since 2010 and completed in late 2016. It is the tallest skyscraper in the Caucasus with 209m of height. Apart from the head office, SOCAR's supporting offices are dispersed across the city.

The first representative office of SOCAR was established in London in 1994. Now the company has offices in London, Frankfurt, Geneva, Vienna, Bucharest, Istanbul, Kyiv, Tbilisi, Astana and Tehran.

== Accidents ==
On 17 August 2013, a gas blowout occurred at the platform No.90 of Bulla Deniz field. As a result, the platform burned from 17 August to 24 October 2013. On 23 October 2014, four workers were killed, and three workers were in injured when during repair works on the platform No. 441 at the Narimanov field a small wagon-house fell into the sea which damaged a gas pipeline and caused a fire. Altogether, fourteen SOCAR's workers were killed in oil and gas platforms accidents in 2014.

On 4 December 2015, three workers of SOCAR were reported missing after part of the living quarters at Oil Rocks fell into the sea due to a heavy storm. At the same day, seven workers were killed, 23 reported missing, and 33 were rescued and evacuated when a fire broke out on the platform No. 10 at the western section of the Gunashli oilfield. (As of January 2016, a total of 10 bodies have been found, leaving 20 people unaccounted for.)

== Corruption and controversies ==
SOCAR is often associated with the widespread corruption in Azerbaijan. In a 2011 survey by Transparency International concerning the anti-corruption practices of 44 oil companies, SOCAR ranked last. Frank Schwabe, a member of the German Bundestag and member of the Parliamentary Assembly of the Council of Europe, sees SOCAR as a "central steering instrument for the foreign policy and sports policy of the authoritarian president of Azerbaijan." SOCAR is considered "well-connected" in Germany and plays a role in the wake of revelations about lobbying and corruption in connection with the Azerbaijani laundromat. The state-owned company supports, among other things, annual symposia organized by the Azerbaijani Embassy in Berlin and the German-Azerbaijani Forum association (DAF).

=== Bribery and illegal payments ===
In 1997/1998, the government of Azerbaijan was in the process of privatizing SOCAR. In 2009 Frederic Bourke, founder of Dooney & Bourke and Viktor Kožený were convicted by a court in Manhattan on paying bribes to the former president of Azerbaijan, Heydar Aliyev, his son and first vice-president of SOCAR at that time Ilham Aliyev and other Azerbaijani government leaders to induce them to rig the privatization of SOCAR in Bourke’s and Kožený's favor. Bourke denied knowing about the bribes, while Kožený admitted bribing Azerbaijani leaders. According to the indictment, the total amount of bribes reached 11 million dollars.

According to a confidential ethics report, in 2013 SOCAR secretly funded a trip to a conference in Baku for 10 U.S. members of Congress and 32 of their staff. Three former senior advisers to then-President Barack Obama appeared as speakers at the event. The congressmen and their staff had their travel expenses and luxury gifts paid for by SOCAR worth hundreds of thousands of dollars. SOCAR allegedly funneled $750,000 in funds through nonprofit companies based in the United States to disguise the origin of the funds. Members of Congress participating in the trip later stated that they had not known that the trip had been funded by SOCAR. SOCAR itself stated that its sponsorship had never been a secret.

In 2017, it became known that SOCAR had made illegal payments totaling 28,000 euros to the Christian Democratic Union of Germany district association in Frankfurt in 2012. By accepting the donations, the party violated the Political Parties Act, as corporate donations from non-EU countries are prohibited. The case led to a years-long legal dispute with the Bundestag administration, of which the public did not learn.

In 2018, it became known that SOCAR paid a controversial donation of 3,000 euros to the German sports club "TuS Dexheim" in 2014. The donation was organized by the then-mayor of Oppenheim and former Social Democratic Party of Germany member of the Bundestag Marcus Held.

=== Embezzlement ===
Two SOCAR subsidiaries embezzled $1.7 billion as part of a contract with BP to expand its operations in the Shah Deniz gas field. The embezzled funds were supposed to go to Azerbaijan's public coffers.

=== Murder of Maltese journalist Daphne Caruana Galizia ===
SOCAR is also part of corruption revelations that led to the murder of Maltese investigative journalist Daphne Caruana Galizia in October 2017. SOCAR's Maltese chief is in custody as a main suspect in connection with the murder.

In April 2021, a Swiss court dismissed a lawsuit by SOCAR, in which Azerbaijan's state-owned company sought to prevent the disclosure of bank information to Latvian police. Latvia is investigating suspicious payments of about 28 million euros by Azerbaijani-controlled shell companies linked to an agreement between the Maltese government and SOCAR. The agreement became public during the investigative research of murdered journalist Daphne Caruana Galizia. Latvian authorities were able to force Swiss banks to release banking information about SOCAR in connection with the investigation of an international money laundering scandal.

=== War propaganda ===
In 2020, SOCAR came under criticism after it publicly engaged in war propaganda against Armenia on behalf of the Azerbaijani government during the 44-day Nagorno-Karabakh war between Armenia and Azerbaijan.

== Sponsorship ==
Since 2012, SOCAR has sought to avoid U.S. sanctions aimed at Iran, its partner in a 28 billion dollar Caspian Sea natural gas project. SOCAR funded an all-expenses-paid US-Azerbaijan "energy conference" in Baku for 10 members of Congress and 32 staff members, which took place on 28 and 29 May 2013. It used two Houston based non-profit organizations, the Assembly of the Friends of Azerbaijan (AFAZ) and the Turquoise Council of Americans and Eurasians, both run by Kemal Oksuz, as conduits.

In May 2013, UEFA announced that SOCAR is an Official Sponsor of the 2016 UEFA European Football Championship final tournament, and acquires rights in connection with the European Qualifiers, which run from 2014 to 2017, and which relate to the qualification matches for UEFA Euro 2016 and the 2018 FIFA World Cup. SOCAR also becomes an Official Sponsor of the 2016 UEFA European Under-17 Football Championship, which will take place in Azerbaijan.

In September 2014, SOCAR signed an agreement to become an Official Partner of Baku 2015 European Games SOCAR is the sponsor of Association of Football Federations of Azerbaijan and Azerbaijani football club Neftchi Baku.

SOCAR became the title sponsor and official partner for the 2019 Formula 1 Azerbaijan Grand Prix event held in Baku. To date, a one-year sponsorship agreement has been made.

In 2021, the UEFA quietly terminated its partnership with SOCAR without informing the public, after criticism of the sponsorship had grown stronger.

On 31 July 2022, SOCAR became the energy & chest sponsor of Turkish giants Galatasaray in European competition matches for next three seasons, starting from 2023 to 24 season.

== See also ==
- Rovnag Abdullayev
- Adnan Ahmadzada
