= List of international prime ministerial trips made by Dorin Recean =

This is a list of international trips made by Dorin Recean, the Prime Minister of Moldova (16 February 2023 – 1 November 2025).

During his term in office he made:

- One visit to Liechtenstein, Ukraine, Hungary, Lithuania, Luxembourg, Greece, Slovakia, United States, Austria and Japan.
- Two visits to Germany.
- Three visits to Switzerland and Turkey and Belgium.
- Five visits to Romania.

== 2023 ==
#	Country	Location	Date	Details
1	Romania	Bucharest	1 March	Met with: Klaus Iohannis – President of Romania; Nicolae Ciucă – Prime Minister of Romania; Alina Gorghiu – Acting President of the Senate; Marcel Ciolacu – President of the Chamber of Deputies; Margareta, Custodian of the Crown of Romania
2	Romania	Bucharest	18 May	Attended the Black Sea and Balkans Security Forum. Spoke at a panel discussion alongside: Nicolae Ciucă – Prime Minister of Romania
3	Turkey	Ankara	3 June	Attended the presidential inauguration of Recep Tayyip Erdoğan.
4	Switzerland	Zurich	25–26 June	Met with the Moldovan diaspora. Visited the Google Headquarters.
4	Liechtenstein	Vaduz	26–28 June	Met with: Daniel Risch – Prime Minister of Liechtenstein
5	Ukraine	Kyiv	23 August	Participated in the 2023 Crimea Platform. Met with: Volodymyr Zelenskyy – President of Ukraine; Katalin Novák – President of Hungary; Denys Shmyhal – Prime Minister of Ukraine; Petteri Orpo – Prime Minister of Finland; Ruslan Stefanchuk – Chairman of the Verkhovna Rada
6	Germany	Berlin	27–29 September	Met with: Svenja Schulze – Federal Minister of Economic Cooperation and Development; Michael Roth – Chair of the Bundestag Foreign Affairs Committee
7	Belgium	Brussels	24–26 October	Participated in the 2023 Global Gateway Summit. Met with: Ursula von der Leyen – President of the European Commission; Josep Borrell – Vice-President of the European Commission; High Representative for Foreign Affairs and Security Policy; Maroš Šefčovič – Vice-President of the European Commission for Interinstitutional Relations; Executive Vice-President of the European Commission for the European Green Deal; Věra Jourová – Vice President of the European Commission for Values and Transparency; Olivér Várhelyi – European Commissioner for Neighbourhood and Enlargement; Paolo Gentiloni – European Commissioner for Economy; Didier Reynders – European Commissioner for Justice; Kadri Simson – European Commissioner for Energy; Wopke Hoekstra – European Commissioner for Climate Action; Virginijus Sinkevičius – European Commissioner for the Environment, Oceans and Fisheries; Adina-Ioana Vălean – European Commissioner for Transport; Jens Stoltenberg – Secretary General of NATO

== 2024 ==
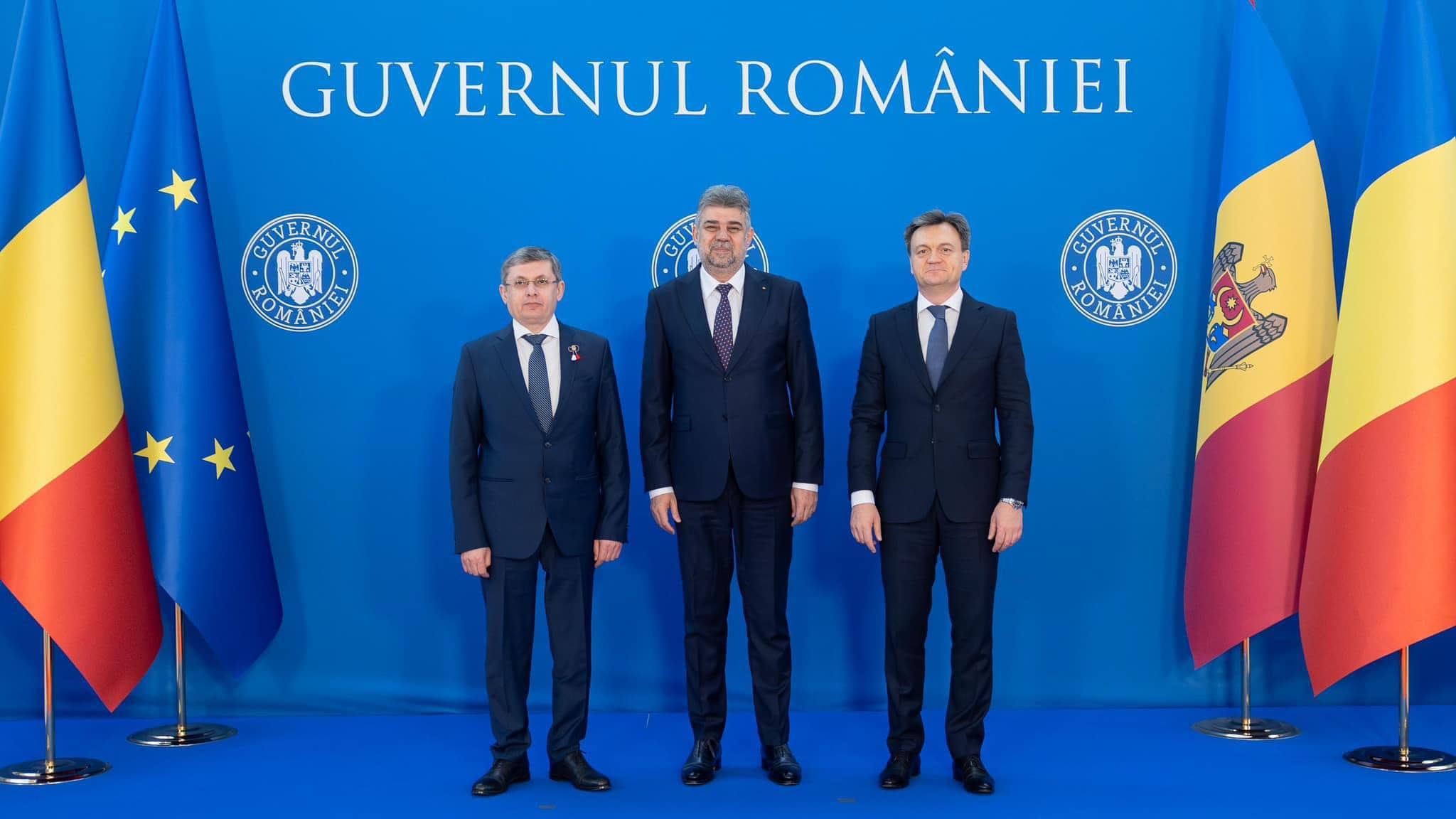
Recean (right) with Romanian Prime Minister Marcel Ciolacu (middle) and Moldovan Parliament Speaker, Igor Grosu (left) in Bucharest, Romania.

#	Country	Location	Date	Details
8	Switzerland	Davos	16–18 January	Participated in the World Economic Forum. Met with: Andrzej Duda – President of Poland; Gitanas Nausėda – President of Lithuania; Mark Rutte – Prime Minister of the Netherlands; Andrej Plenković – Prime Minister of Croatia; Nikolai Denkov – Prime Minister of Bulgaria; Daniel Risch – Prime Minister of Liechtenstein; Borjana Krišto – Chairwoman of the Council of Ministers of Bosnia and Herzegovina; Albert II, Prince of Monaco; Odile Renaud-Basso – President of the European Bank for Reconstruction and Development; Tony Blair – Former Prime Minister of the United Kingdom; Sanna Marin – Former Prime Minister of Finland
9	Hungary	Budapest	25 January	Met with: Katalin Novák – President of Hungary; Viktor Orbán – Prime Minister of Hungary
10	Turkey	Antalya	1 March	Participated in the Antalya Diplomacy Forum. Met with: Rumen Radev – President of Bulgaria
11	Romania	Bucharest	7 March	Attended the European People's Party Congress. Had bilateral talks with: Nicolae Ciucă – President of the Senate of Romania; Antonio Tajani – Deputy Prime Minister, Minister of Foreign Affairs and International Cooperation of Italy
12	Romania	Bucharest	27 March	Met with: Marcel Ciolacu – Prime Minister of Romania; Margareta, Custodian of the Crown of Romania
13	Lithuania	Vilnius	11–12 April	Participated in the Three Seas Initiative Summit. Met with: Ingrida Šimonytė – Prime Minister of Lithuania; Viktorija Čmilytė-Nielsen – Speaker of the Seimas
14	Romania	Bucharest	9 May	Participated in the CFA Central and Eastern Europe Investment Conference.
15	Belgium	Brussels	20–21 May	Met with: Charles Michel – President of the European Council; Josep Borrell – Vice-President of the European Commission; High Representative for Foreign Affairs and Security Policy; Olivér Várhelyi – European Commissioner for Neighbourhood and Enlargement; Paolo Gentiloni – European Commissioner for Economy
16	Germany	Berlin	11 June	Participated in the 2024 Ukraine Recovery Conference. Had bilateral meetings with: Annalena Baerbock – Minister of Foreign Affairs of Germany; Svenja Schulze – Minister of Economic Cooperation and Development of Germany; Martin Kocher – Minister of Digital and Economic Affairs of Austria; Nadia Calviño – President of the European Investment Bank; Vasco Cordeiro – President of the European Committee of the Regions
17	Luxembourg	Luxembourg	24–26 June	Led the Moldovan delegation at the inaugural Moldova-European Union Accession Conference. Met with: Luc Frieden – Prime Minister of Luxembourg; Xavier Bettel – Deputy Prime Minister of Luxembourg; Minister of Foreign Affairs, Foreign Trade, Development Cooperation and Humanitarian Affairs; Henri, Grand Duke of Luxembourg; Olivér Várhelyi – European Commissioner for Neighbourhood and Enlargement; Olha Stefanishyna – Deputy Prime Minister for European and Euro-Atlantic Integration of Ukraine
18	Greece	Athens	1–2 July	Met with: Katerina Sakellaropoulou – President of Greece; Kyriakos Mitsotakis – Prime Minister of Greece
19	Slovakia	Bratislava	10 September	Met with: Peter Pellegrini – President of Slovakia; Robert Fico – Prime Minister of Slovakia; Peter Žiga – Acting Speaker of the National Council
20	United States	New York	27 September	Gave a speech at the 79th session of the UN General Assembly. Met with: António Guterres – Secretary-General of the United Nations; Andrej Plenković – Prime Minister of Croatia

== 2025 ==
#	Country	Location	Date	Details
21	Switzerland	Davos	22–23 January	Attended the World Economic Forum. Met with: Guy Parmelin – Vice President of Switzerland; Aleksandar Vučić – President of Serbia; Borjana Krišto – Chairwoman of the Council of Ministers of Bosnia and Herzegovina; Daniel Risch – Prime Minister of Liechtenstein; Valdis Dombrovskis – Executive Vice President of the European Commission for An Economy that Works for People; European Commissioner for Trade; Marta Kos – European Commissioner for Enlargement; Radosław Sikorski – Minister of Foreign Affairs of Poland; Jean-Noël Barrot – Minister for Europe and Foreign Affairs of France; Emil Hurezeanu – Minister of Foreign Affairs of Romania; Odile Renaud-Basso – President of the European Bank for Reconstruction and Development; Maxim Timchenko – CEO of DTEK
22	Turkey	Antalya	11 April	Attended the Antalya Diplomacy Forum.
23	Belgium	Brussels	3–4 June	Attended the 9th Meeting of the EU-Moldova Association Council. Met with: António Costa – President of the European Council; Roberta Metsola – President of the European Parliament; Kaja Kallas – Vice-President of the European Commission; High Representative for Foreign Affairs and Security Policy; Teresa Ribera – First Executive Vice-President of the European Commission for Clean, Just and Competitive Transition; Commissioner for Competition; Valdis Dobrovskis – Executive Vice President of the European Commission for An Economy that Works for People; Commissioner for Trade; Marta Kos – European Commissioner for Neighbourhood and Enlargement; Piotr Serafin – European Commissioner for Budget and Administration; Christophe Hansen – European Commissioner for Agriculture and Food; Ekaterina Zaharieva – European Commissioner for Startups, Research and Innovation; Manfred Weber – MEP; President of the European People's Party
24	Austria	Vienna	13 June	Attended the Europa-Forum Wachau. Met with: Christian Stocker – Chancellor of Austria; Rosen Zhelyazkov – Prime Minister of Bulgaria
25	Japan	Tokyo, Osaka	30 August – 2 September	Met with: Shigeru Ishiba – Prime Minister of Japan; Yuichiro Koga – State Minister of Economy, Trade and Industry
