= European Bank for Reconstruction and Development =

Financial institution which supports more than 30 countries

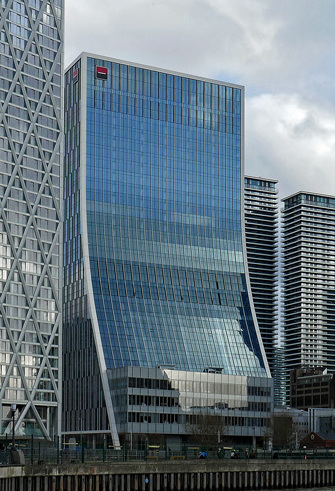
- One Bank Street in Canary Wharf, EBRD head office since 2022
- Type: International financial institution
- Industry: international governmental or non-governmental organizations
- Founded: 1991; 35 years ago
- Founder: Jacques Attali
- Headquarters: London, E14 4BG; United Kingdom
- Key people: Odile Renaud-Basso (current president); Jacques Attali (inaugural president)
- Net income: €−1.1 billion (2022)
- Total assets: €71.63 billion (2022)
- Total equity: €19.33 billion (2022)
- Members: 79 (77 countries and two European Union institutions)
- Number of employees: 3,000 (2016)
- Website: www.ebrd.com

EBRD members

The European Bank for Reconstruction and Development (EBRD; French: Banque européenne pour la reconstruction et le développement or BERD), is an international financial institution founded in 1991 in Paris. As a multilateral developmental investment bank, the EBRD uses investment as a tool to build market economies.

Initially focused on the countries of the former Eastern Bloc, it expanded to support development in more than 30 countries from Central Europe to Central Asia. Similar to other multilateral development banks, the EBRD has members from all over the world (North America, Africa, Asia and Australia, see below), with the biggest single shareholder being the United States, but only lends regionally in its countries of operations. The EBRD is owned by 77 countries, the European Union and the European Investment Bank. Despite its public sector shareholders, it invests in private enterprises, together with commercial partners.

The EBRD is not to be confused with the European Investment Bank (EIB), which is owned by EU member states and is used to support EU policy. EBRD is also distinct from the Council of Europe Development Bank (CEB).

== History of the EBRD ==
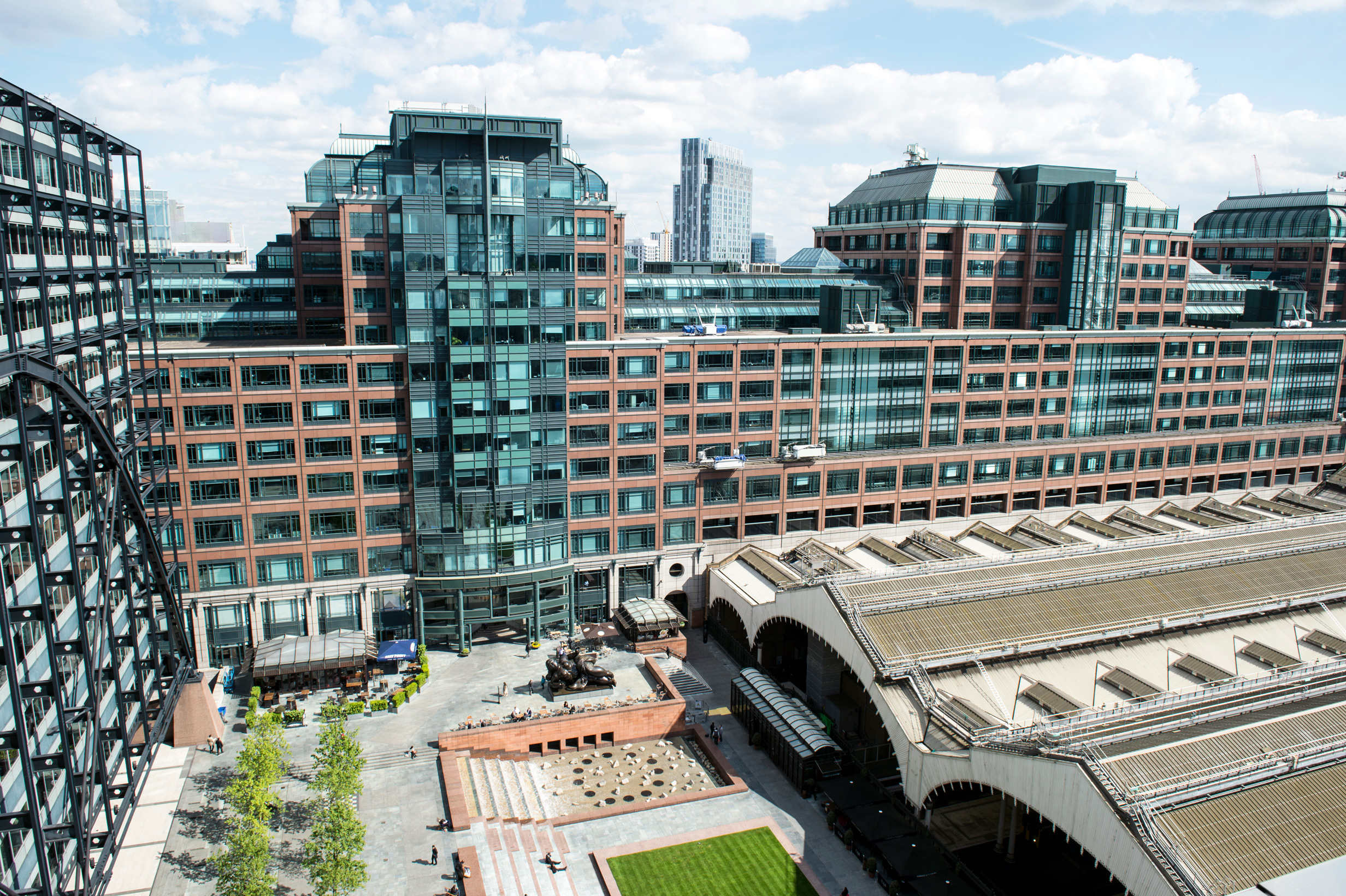
175 Bishopsgate in London, the EBRD's head office between 1992 and 2022

The bank was founded by Jacques Attali and attracted to the City of London by a special grant of £40 million from HM Treasury under Norman Lamont, who was appointed to the bank's board of governors. The EBRD was intended at its beginning to focus on the switch from centrally planned economy to market based economy in the Central and Eastern European countries by investing in the private sector, mainly banks, industries and businesses, and by promoting policies that would favor them. It was created as a result of the end of the Cold War because of particular issues regarding the international system in place, the historical and political context at the time. Furthermore, its recipient countries had to ensure that they would work towards "multi-party democracy and political pluralism" in which was considered as one of the main particularity of the EBRD distinguishing the latter from other financial institutions. Firstly, notably advocated by European political actors such as the French President Mitterrand in 1989, the idea of creating this financial institution involving the European countries started before the fall of the Berlin Wall. The reception of this proposition was mitigated depending on the country, for instance it received hostility from the British whereas the French were important proponents of the project and influenced the process. In January 1990, negotiations about the EBRD objectives, its lending policy regarding the public and private sectors, started and involved all the EU countries at the time, as well as various other European countries, non-European countries and representatives from the EU and the European Investment Bank. The Soviet Union was represented by its own delegation in the process and thus participated in the negotiations as well as the USA. Later on, because of dissensions on the political and economic objectives of the institution, the inclusion of the Soviet Union was threatened. Considered as short negotiations, the agreement (for reasons relating to the situation in Eastern Europe and to a wave of privatization across Europe) leading to its creation was signed on 29 May 1990 by actors such as 40 states as well as two European organizations and by March 1991 took its first effects as the bank was inaugurated. The creation of the EBRD has led to the financing of various projects in the years following its first operations, for instance there were twenty projects in 1992 in which the EBRD provided financing worth ECU 2.1 billion.

== Governance ==
Divided between its headquarters located in London, and field offices located elsewhere, the European Bank for reconstruction and development is made of a three-tier structure composed of firstly, the president and the staff, secondly the Board of Governors and finally the Board of Directors. The bank’s structure has changed over time, because of concerns about competition within the institution. In fact, in the beginning of the 90s, there were two different banking divisions (on one side, the merchant banking related to the private sector and on the other side the development banking side working mostly with the public sector). Consequently, the two divisions came to be merged into a single one, substituting this structure with another one instead dividing the bank with seven policy and country regional sub-divisions.

=== Board of Governors ===
Representatives from each member state compose this board, they have authority power. Currently (2024-2025) Slovenia is the Chair of Board of Governors, while Iceland and Turkey are the Vice Chairs.

=== Board of Directors ===
The Board of Directors consists of 23 members elected by the Board of Governors. These members can not be on the Board of Governors. Its function is to direct the general operations of the bank, notably:

- Approve the budget;
- In accordance with the Board of Governors, establishing policies and making other decisions, loans, investments;
- Prepare the work of the Board of Governors;
- Submit yearly for approval the audited accounts to the Board of Governors.

=== President ===
The EBRD is composed of many members with voting powers, from European and non-European states to the membership of other institutions such as the European Investment Bank, however depending on the geographical location of each member, voting rights differ. More precisely, European and other creditor members hold a majority voting power. At its beginning, the EBRD was owned by more than 40 members, in 2015 the number of countries owning it was 61. and as of September 2026, there were 75 countries as owners.

The following presidents have served the EBRD to date (as of September 2026).

- Jacques Attali: April 1991 – June 1993
- Jacques de Larosière: September 1993 – January 1998
- Horst Köhler: September 1998 – April 2000
- Jean Lemierre: July 2000 – July 2008
- Thomas Mirow: July 2008 – July 2012
- Suma Chakrabarti: July 2012 – July 2020
- Odile Renaud-Basso: 2020 – present

=== Membership ===
To become a member of the bank, a country needs to fit the EBRD's Articles of Agreement. These Articles stipulate that a country can only become a Member State if it is a state in Europe or a non-European member of the IMF. Institutions like the European Union and the EIB also participate in the bank operations. Since its foundation the EBRD has almost doubled in membership size. The latest accessions to the bank are countries located in Africa.

=== Shareholders ===
EBRD shareholders
| Shareholder | Date joined | Capital subscription |
|---|---|---|
| Albania | 18 December 1991 | €30010000 |
| Algeria | 19 October 2021 | €2030000 |
| Armenia | 7 December 1992 | €14990000 |
| Australia | 30 March 1991 | €300140000 |
| Austria | 28 March 1991 | €776290000 |
| Azerbaijan | 25 September 1992 | €30010000 |
| Belarus (Note: In response to the Russian invasion of Ukraine since 2022, the Board of Governors of EBRD suspended access to the bank's resources by both Russian and Belarusian entities, and closed the bank's offices in both capitals Moscow and Minsk, but both countries are still shareholders.) | 10 June 1992 | €60020000 |
| Belgium | 10 April 1991 | €684320000 |
| Benin | 10 April 2024 | €2030000 |
| Bosnia and Herzegovina | 17 June 1996 | €50710000 |
| Bulgaria | 28 March 1991 | €237110000 |
| Canada | 28 March 1991 | €1157640000 |
| China | 15 January 2016 | €29000000 |
| Croatia | 15 April 1993 | €124120000 |
| Cyprus | 28 March 1991 | €30010000 |
| Czech Republic | 1 January 1993 | €290530000 |
| Denmark | 28 March 1991 | €360170000 |
| Egypt | 28 March 1991 | €30870000 |
| Estonia | 28 February 1992 | €30010000 |
| European Investment Bank | 28 March 1991 | €1021460000 |
| European Union | 28 March 1991 | €900440000 |
| Finland | 28 March 1991 | €375180000 |
| France | 28 March 1991 | €2556510000 |
| Georgia | 4 September 1992 | €34040000 |
| Germany | 28 March 1991 | €2556510000 |
| Greece | 29 March 1991 | €195080000 |
| Hungary | 28 March 1991 | €237110000 |
| Iceland | 29 May 1991 | €30010000 |
| India | 11 July 2018 | €9860000 |
| Iraq | 14 November 2023 | €2030000 |
| Ireland | 28 March 1991 | €102140000 |
| Israel | 28 March 1991 | €195080000 |
| Italy | 28 March 1991 | €2556510000 |
| Ivory Coast | 18 December 2024 | €2030000 |
| Japan | 2 April 1991 | €2900110000 |
| Jordan | 29 December 2011 | €11180000 |
| Kazakhstan | 27 July 1992 | €69020000 |
| Kenya | 15 July 2025 | €2030000 |
| Kosovo | 17 December 2012 | €5800000 |
| Kyrgyzstan | 5 June 1992 | €21010000 |
| Latvia | 18 March 1992 | €30010000 |
| Lebanon | 17 July 2017 | €9860000 |
| Libya | 16 July 2019 | €9860000 |
| Liechtenstein | 28 March 1991 | €5990000 |
| Lithuania | 5 March 1992 | €34040000 |
| Luxembourg | 28 March 1991 | €60020000 |
| Malta | 28 March 1991 | €2100000 |
| Mexico | 28 March 1991 | €45010000 |
| Moldova | 5 May 1992 | €30010000 |
| Mongolia | 9 October 2000 | €2990000 |
| Montenegro | 3 June 2006 | €5990000 |
| Morocco | 28 March 1991 | €27950000 |
| Netherlands | 28 March 1991 | €844390000 |
| New Zealand | 19 August 1991 | €10500000 |
| Nigeria | 26 February 2025 | €5220000 |
| North Macedonia | 21 April 1993 | €19980000 |
| Norway | 28 March 1991 | €375180000 |
| Poland | 28 March 1991 | €435810000 |
| Portugal | 5 April 1991 | €126050000 |
| Romania | 28 March 1991 | €163430000 |
| Russia | 9 April 1992 | €1200580000 |
| San Marino | 7 June 2019 | €2030000 |
| Senegal | 15 July 2025 | €2030000 |
| Serbia | 19 January 2001 | €140310000 |
| Slovakia | 1 January 1993 | €145280000 |
| Slovenia | 23 December 1992 | €71410000 |
| South Korea | 28 March 1991 | €340480000 |
| Spain | 28 March 1991 | €1020490000 |
| Sweden | 28 March 1991 | €684320000 |
| Switzerland | 29 March 1991 | €684320000 |
| Tajikistan | 16 October 1992 | €21010000 |
| Tunisia | 29 December 2011 | €9860000 |
| Turkey | 28 March 1991 | €391530000 |
| Turkmenistan | 1 June 1992 | €2100000 |
| Ukraine | 13 April 1992 | €240110000 |
| United Arab Emirates | 23 September 2021 | €2030000 |
| United Kingdom | 28 March 1991 | €2900110000 |
| United States | 28 March 1991 | €3001480000 |
| Uzbekistan | 30 April 1992 | €44120000 |
| 77+2 total | (28 March 1991) | €29755502000 |

== Public banking ==
The EBRD is a public bank, meaning that public institutions such as states are shareholders in those institutions. More precisely, public financial institutions are controlled major predominantly by public authorities (more than 50%) whereas in institutions with public participations, public authorities aren't majority shareholders. Public banks were particularly involved in the economic transition of the former Soviet Republics and Central and Eastern European countries as private banks and other sources of financing didn't want to invest for reasons such as those countries’ macroeconomic difficulties as well as political reasons regarding the country’s stability for instance.

=== Relationship with the EIB ===
In the context of the EU’s investment banking, the EBRD and the EIB have been involved in a rivalry regarding the status of the “EU’s premier development bank”. Major criticism about the EBRD in this situation is related to the fact that non-EU countries are also important shareholders whereas the EIB is completely owned by the EU. More recently, another source of rivalry was about becoming the new “European Climate and Sustainable Development Bank (ECSDB).

=== Public banks and the COVID-19 pandemic ===
More recently, since the start of the COVID-19 pandemic, public banks have had their influence and role increased as they have become important actors of the economic recovery response. As for the European Bank for Reconstruction and Development, it has committed €21 billion between 2020 and 2021 of activities. More precisely, its own package was established within the scope of the Resilience Framework, the Trade Facilitation Programme and the Vital Infrastructure Support Programme etc. In 2020 alone, it has invested €11 billion as part of 411 projects which corresponds to a 10% raison compared to 2019. 72% of its investments were received by the private sector. Moreover, because of this specific context, the EBRD focused some of its operations in sectors other than green investment meaning that it only focused 29% of its investment in this domain (compared to 46% in 2019).

== Financing ==
=== Donors ===
According to the EBRD 2020 Sustainability Report, donors provided €589 million to support EBRD activities, taking the form of grants, loans and risk-mitigating instruments.

The EBRD funds come mainly from bilateral donors, from the Climate Investment Funds (CIF), the European Union (EU), the Global Environment Facility (GEF), and the Green Climate Fund (GCF).

=== Financial operations ===
According to the EBRD, the bank provides different direct financial instruments such as loans, equity investments and guarantees. It also works on the assistance of SMEs through the intermediary of other banks or investment and venture capital funds which are linked to the EBRD’s investments.

=== Steps leading to a loan ===
Each project is analysed, first by the EBRD management with the negotiations and the subsequent signing of a mandate letter drafting the important information about the project plan, the expected expenses as well as the responsibilities. Secondly, the project is to be finally reviewed by the management. Later on, it is submitted to the Board of Directors for approval. After being signed for both parties, it becomes legally binding. It leads to the transfer of funds from the EBRD to the client which will in the future start to repay the bank’s loan.

== Environmental sustainability ==
The EBRD is unique among development banks for two reasons. First, it was the first multilateral development bank to have an explicit environmental mandate in its charter (since 1995), and second, in that it will not finance thermal coal mining and coal-fired electricity generation due to their environmental impact.

The following table shows the development of investment volume into the Green Economy Transition (GET) approach, in support of the Paris climate goals.

| Year | Total investment | GET investment | Ratio | Ref. |
|---|---|---|---|---|
| 2016 | 9.4 billion EUR | 2.9 billion EUR | 31% | |
| 2017 | 9.7 billion EUR | 4.1 billion EUR | 43% | |
| 2018 | 9.5 billion EUR | 3.3 billion EUR | 36% | |
| 2019 | 10.1 billion EUR | 4.6 billion EUR | 46% | |

The EBRD had pledged, prior to 2015 Paris Agreement, to dedicate above 40 per cent of its financing to green investment by 2020. This goal was accomplished for the first time in 2017. With Russia actually being the biggest donor to an NDEP Support Fund for the environments inside the bank, with total contributions amounting to €60 million. €5 million was donated by Russia in the same year of 2015.

== Activities ==
=== Collaboration of the bank with the European institutions and private actors ===
Not only involving the European institutions, the EBRD financed projects also implicate private actors such as firms as well as foreign investors in the process. As part of its lending policies, the EBRD mostly lends capital to the private sector as lending to the public sector is capped at 40% maximum.

=== Influencing ===
As a neoliberal institution, the EBRD participates in policy debates by publishing macroeconomic analysis as well as economic forecasts that are used by both governments and international financial institutions.

=== Mediation ===
More recently, other than its original lending role, the EBRD has played a mediating role in Europe, for instance in Moldova in 2013 and even in the Central Asian region (most notably in countries such as the Kyrgyz Republic and Tajikistan for instance) by intervening as a third party in commercial disputes which has become one of its major areas of activities. As a mediating actor, the EBRD has managed to involve other actors such as businesses and Chambers of Commerce among others. Moreover, a regional forum on commercial mediation was established by the bank as part of its work, which has managed to involve various representatives from countries in Europe and Asia, such as judges and experts for instance.

=== The initial focus on transition economy ===
It is notable that one of the main objectives of the European Bank for Reconstruction and Development was to become a link between the European Union, its institutions and the countries it would focus on. As the recipients were previously centrally planned economies, the EBRD centered through its operations on working with the private sector, which was the principal target of central planning. Focusing on the integration and modernisation process, as part of its projects, the EBRD has notably invested in important sectors such as telecommunications in the Central and Eastern European countries.

=== To modern challenges ===
Since the 90s, recipients of EBRD financing have diversified, in fact, from mainly targeting EEC countries, the bank has moved to the Asian continent and increasingly focused on other countries such as China. More generally, Suma Chakrabarti, the EBRD president from 2012 to 2020, has pushed in the beginning of the 2010s for modernizing the bank. Reforms encompassed the bank's structure in itself, for instance by changing the management team, and its processes (for instance about policy dialogue or methodology regarding the concept of transition) in order for them to be more efficient.

=== Sustainable market economies ===
Since the 2000s, the focus has shifted towards the issue over sustainable market economies, notably in the context of the 2008 financial crisis, which harshly impacted population and their trust in financial institutions, democracy and free market. As a result, a rethinking of the concept of transition has taken place within the EBRD and has impacted the activities of the bank. Furthermore, the concept of transition was reviewed in 2015. In fact, it led to the idea that the ideal market economy is made of a greatly competitive, resilient and integrated market and is complemented by a good governance system conducted by a well-functioning state which has to be environmental friendly and inclusive.

In Armenia, EBRD has been operating since 1986, investing over €2 billion in over 200 projects. More than 90% of these investments have been made in private enterprises. The bank's key areas of investment include the financial sector, SMEs, and sustainable infrastructure. They invest, engage in policy-making, and offer technical assistance in order to encourage these areas locally. The EBRD invests around €150 million in Armenia's economy every year. Its partner financial institutions lend approximately €100 million to local SMEs through a variety of programs that promote trade, green energy, and financial access.

=== Related to environment and climate change ===
Gradually, climate change and sustainable development became the focus point of the European Union, then consequently found its importance as one of the main challenges that the EBRD has to tackle. It became linked to the objective of forming sustainable market economies. In 2021, Anastassia Obydenkova research has indicated that positive evolutions have been made, for instance that carbon emission from some of the states benefiting from EBRD loans have decreased.

== EBRD key achievements since 2020 ==
=== Environment ===
The EBRD agreed a new green economy approach for 2021–2025 and adopted a target of becoming a majority green bank by 2025. It invested €3.2 billion in climate mitigation, climate adaptation and other activities related to environmental issues in 2020. Moreover, the EBRD signed up to the Sustainable Blue Economy Finance Principles which represent the world’s first global guiding framework for banks, insurers, and investors to invest in the blue economy in a sustainable way.

The EBRD also aims to support the corporate transition to decarbonisation, for instance in Poland (EV battery performance), in Turkey (elimination of plastics in single-use hygiene products), and in Ukraine (green supermarkets); and support green infrastructures.

=== Political and human rights standards ===
Linked to its objective of contributing to political transformation in the EBRD's country targets in which projects are financed, this institution contributes to political transformation in these same states. From the beginning of the negotiations that led to the creation of the EBRD, the question of democracy and human rights were included in the matter discussed. Those issues are clearly stated in the agreement.

The EBRD is devoted to strengthen its approach to human-rights and also to gender-based issues. For instance, it posted a 14.8 percent year-on-year increase in the number of projects it supports that promote gender inclusion. Moreover, the EBRD established a cross-departmental Human Rights Working Group and has developed internal human rights guidance.

=== COVID-19 response ===
The EBRD provided €802 million of support under the Vital Infrastructure Support Programme launched in April 2020, an emergency support programme for infrastructure providers which is part of its overall Solidarity Package response to COVID-19 adopted on 13 March 2020. The package delivered emergency liquidity and the EBRD invested more than €10 billion, both in 2019 and 2020.

=== Partnerships with NGOs ===
The EBRD has signed partnership agreements with Oxfam and Save the Children.

== Criticism ==
=== About the EBRD ===
In the 90s, the start of the EBRD actions have been considered as slow as the amount of money loaned was rather modest compared to what was available.

There have been criticism regarding potential conflict of interest as it appeared that instead of focusing on public interests, some bankers' operations were influenced by their clients' needs, contrary to the objective of the EBRD.

According to Branko Milanović, the analysis of global distribution of incomes has shown that the positive globalisation impact has mainly favoured the super-rich part of the population, thus deepening the inequalities of wealth concentration within the population. Furthermore, this uneven concentration is notably visible in the countries benefiting from the EBRD activities. This has led to a reflection over the idea of winners and losers regarding globalisation.

In contrast to the highlighted inclusion objective, concerns regarding inclusion, which notably involves gender equality, have been rather absent from the bank's attributions until recently. For instance, a Strategic Gender Initiative was validated by the EBRD President in 2013 as well as various projects involving gender equality related objectives.

NGOs have criticised the EBRD on the lack of progress the EBRD makes in its main mission, the “transition towards open and democratic market economies.”

=== Regarding its investments ===
Inequality of the lending : most projects were related to the Visegrad countries that were the ones with the most developed private sectors meaning that the EBRD was underinvesting in the countries that were the most supposed to receive its participation. For instance, those countries (Czech Republic, Hungary, Poland) were involved in 46% of the projects signed during the 1991–1993 period.

==== Environmentally harmful projects ====
Some NGOs have criticized the EBRD for financing projects they consider to be environmentally and socially harmful. Although it has increased its investments in energy efficiency and sustainable energy in recent years, the NGOs say the bank diminishes the impacts of green investments by financing carbon-intensive development such as coal, oil, and gas production, transportation, and generation, motorways, airports, fast food, and animal agriculture. Among the contested projects are the Ombla power plant in Croatia, the Kumtor Gold Mine in Kyrgyzstan, and the Šoštanj lignite power plant in Slovenia.

In 2025, the EBRD considered investing €40 million to expand Burger King and Popeyes locations across Poland, Romania, and the Czech Republic, but cancelled the plan following opposition by environmental and animal welfare activists.

==== The Balkans ====
The EBRD's activities in the Balkans have attracted particular controversy and criticism, especially when they have centered on national parks or free-flowing rivers. This has often involved the completed or proposed construction of hydroelectric dams and road infrastructure. Indeed, a 2017 report alleged deficiencies in monitoring and mitigation measures that had been designed to lessen the environmental impact of dam projects financed by the EBRD, while, in March 2018, outdoor clothing label Patagonia helped launch The Dam Truth campaign, which directly requests international banks including the EBRD to "stop investing in the destruction of Europe's last wild rivers".

In 2011, the EBRD approved a €65 million loan to ELEM, the Macedonian electricity utility, for a dam at Boskov Most. The Standing Committee of the Bern Convention requested immediate suspension of the project, with reference to the high biodiversity of the area and its importance as a core reproductive area for the Balkan lynx, one of the most endangered mammals on the planet. In January 2017, the bank cancelled the loan saying the "conditions for disbursement were not met."

Again in North Macedonia, the EBRD was criticised by environmentalists after plans were announced to bisect National Park Galičica in the UNESCO Ohrid-Prespa Transboundary Biosphere Reserve with an A3 express road, which would have required certain zones of protection in the national park to be downgraded. Scientists from North Macedonia and across the world signed a declaration in opposition to this and other projects proposed for the Ohrid-Prespa region, a message that was reinforced by a Joint Reactive Monitoring Mission from the World Heritage Centre, ICOMOS and the IUCN, which requested total cancellation of proposed A3 road sections. This recommendation was underlined by the World Heritage Committee at its 41st session in Kraków. Eventually, in February 2018, the Republic of North Macedonia abandoned plans for the road, redirecting the EBRD's funds to other infrastructure projects.

=== Regarding the targeted countries ===
Even though, its major objectives is to push for democracy and respect of human rights, the EBRD has been accused of not working towards those goals by not applying enough pressure and even "holding its annual meetings in dictator-run countries". Furthermore, reports have highlighted the fact that an important part of the loans provided by the EBRD go to countries with authoritarian leaders as of the beginning of 2022, including states such as Belarus or Egypt among others, and this despite its major objective of promoting democracy.

==== 2014 sanctions against Russia ====
The EBRD announced on 23 July 2014 that it would suspend new investment projects in Russia, following an earlier declaration by the European Council. The European Council declaration was made in the context of the 2014 pro-Russian unrest in Ukraine. As of 2014 Russia has been the biggest funding recipient of all countries. In 2013, the Russian Federation received €1.8 billion for investments from the EBRD and 1 billion € from the EIB. Russia employed the funds to finance a variety of projects like pipeline valves, property acquisitions, and a loan to a hypermarket chain. Two Russian projects were awaiting funding from the EBRD: a €300 million plan for promoting energy efficiency, and a $180 million loan to lease agricultural and forestry equipment. The bank stated that it will continue to manage ongoing projects in Russia. Despite denying Russia new funds, the EBRD continues to insist on its 6.1% of ownership in the Moscow Stock Exchange, seeking profits from Russia with the privatisation of the Soviet economy.

==== Azerbaijan's oil and gas sector ====
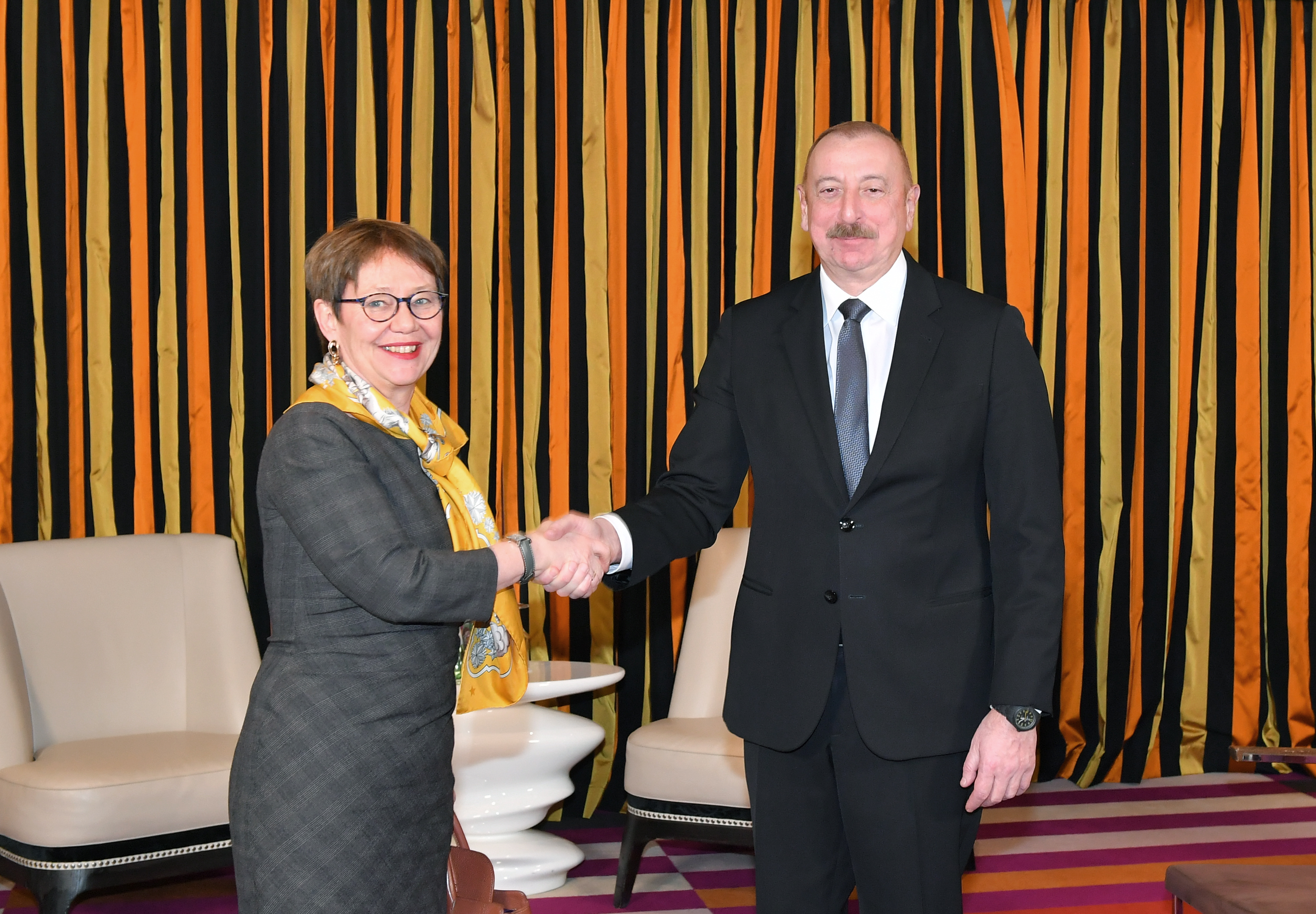
Bank's President Odile Renaud-Basso with Azerbaijan's President Ilham Aliyev in February 2024

Building the Southern Gas Corridor, European countries and companies support gas exports from Azerbaijan and contribute to Azerbaijan's government finances. The Aliyev regime is considered by many NGOs and watchdogs organizations as repressive and activists and journalists are regularly arrested on false charges and imprisoned. The International Federation for Human Rights (FIDH) wrote in 2015, that "for more than a decade Azerbaijan has made shameless use of caviar diplomacy to charm European governments, its most important oil and gas clients". The EEC BankWatch warns that "Developing Shah Deniz stage 2 and the Southern Gas Corridor is likely to cement further the oppressive structures of the Aliyev government".

The EBRD has invested over 3 billion euros ($3.5 billion) in 177 projects in Azerbaijan. The EBRD approved three loans for the Shah Deniz gas field (US$200 million, US$250 million and US$100 million) as well as a US$500 million loan for the Trans-Anatolian gas pipeline (TANAP), and stated its financial support to the Trans Adriatic Pipeline (TAP) could amount to EUR 1.2 billion.

== See also ==
- Development Finance Institution – Banking company that provides risk capital for economic development projects
- Green Climate Fund – Fund helping developing countries to counter climate change
- Sustainable development – Mode of human development
- Ukeep – EBRD credit facility for Ukrainian energy-efficiency projects
