= White Stream =

Georgia-Romania/Ukraine pipeline

Location
- Country: Georgia, Romania, Ukraine
- Direction: east–west
- Start: near Tbilisi, Georgia
- Passes through: Supsa, Black Sea
- To: Constanța

General information
- Type: natural gas
- Operator: GUEU – White Stream Pipeline Company

Technical information
- Length: 1,238 km (769 mi)
- Maximum discharge: 32 billion cubic meters per year

White Stream (also known as the Georgia–Ukraine–EU gas pipeline) is a proposed pipeline project to transport natural gas from the Caspian region to Romania and Ukraine with further supplies to Central Europe.

== History ==
For the first time, the White Stream idea was presented by Ukrainian officials in 2005. In 2006–2007, the project was discussed at different international conferences. In May 2007, it was presented at the Vienna Gas Forum, and on 11 October 2007, it was presented during the summit-level Energy Security Conference in Vilnius. On 28 January 2008, Prime Minister of Ukraine Yulia Tymoshenko asked the European Union to consider participating in the White Stream project. On 28 May 2008, the European Commission identified the project as 'Project of Common Interest' and further flagged as a 'Priority Project' (Commission Decision C(2008) 1969 final of 28 May 2008). The Government of Georgia signed a Memorandum of Understanding with White Stream in March 2009.

The company developing the White Stream project had received co-funding for studies under EU's TEN-E programme. The first TEN-E grant was supported by the Government of Romania. The second grant was supported by the Governments of Romania, Poland, and Lithuania.

The importance of White Stream grew significantly at the end of October, 2009. Continuous monopolization of energy transit routes by Turkey's AKP government through its territory led Azerbaijani government to consider diversification of its exports within South Caucasus by potentially using White Stream for Azerbaijani gas to reach Europe. The option was laid out by Azerbaijani President Ilham Aliyev along with previously considered onshore routes through Russia and Iran during his recent special session on gas issues.

== Route ==
The pipeline would branch off from the South Caucasus Pipeline near Tbilisi and run for 133 kilometres (83 mi) via Georgia to Supsa at the Black Sea. From Supsa there are two possible offshore routes. The direct route from Supsa to Constanţa in Romania is 1,105 kilometres (687 mi) long. In this case, the long connection to Crimea would be built at the later stage. Another option is that the pipeline would run to Constanţa through Crimea. A 630 kilometres (390 mi) long offshore pipeline would make landfall near Feodosiya. From there, a 215 kilometres (134 mi) long onshore pipeline would cross the Crimea and a 395 kilometres (245 mi) long offshore pipeline would continue to Romania. In Ukraine the pipeline was to be linked to Ukraine's transit system by 200 kilometres (120 mi) long onshore branch. It would allow to diversify supplies for Poland, Lithuania, and Slovakia.

In Constanţa, gas from White Stream was to supply demand in Romania and neighboring markets. It was also to supply a proposed onshore gas pipeline running parallel to the planned Pan-European Oil Pipeline, expected to run directly across the Balkan peninsula to Trieste in north-east Italy or possibly to the Baumgarten gas hub in Austria.

== Technical features ==
At the first stage the initial capacity of the pipeline was to be 8 billion cubic metres (280×10^{9} cu ft) of natural gas per year. At this stage the pipeline would be supplied from the Shah Deniz gas field from the Azerbaijan's Caspian offshore sector. If the planned Trans-Caspian Gas Pipeline is built, the total capacity of pipeline would increase to 32 billion cubic metres (1.1×10^{12} cu ft).

White Stream would consist of a number of legs with capacity of 8–9 billion cubic metres (280×10^{9}–320×10^{9} cu ft) of each. The diameter of the Georgian section would be 42 inches (1,070 mm) for the onshore section and 28 inches (710 mm) for the offshore section. In Crimea most likely larger-diameter new pipelines would be used where existing 20 inches (510 mm) diameter pipelines do not have adequate capacity. In the deepest sections of the sea, the project was expected to use 26 inches (660 mm) steel tubes, provided that the maximum water depth does not exceed 2,000 metres (6,600 ft) below the sea surface. It was proposed to use J-Lay barges to lay the pipes on the seabed.

The pipeline was expected to commence commercial operations in 2016.

== Project company ==
The project was promoted by a London-based GUEU – White Stream Pipeline Company. The composition of the consortium was not disclosed. According to Vladimir Socor, the consortium was led by the London-based Pipeline Systems Engineering and the New-York-based Radon-Ishizumi consulting and engineering firms.

== See also ==
- Energy in Georgia (country)
- Energy in Ukraine
