= Trans-Caspian Gas Pipeline =

Proposed subsea pipeline

- The Trans/Caspian gas pipeline would run under the Caspian Sea from Türkmenbaşy to the Sangachal Terminal, where it would connect with the existing pipeline to Erzurum in Turkey, which in turn would be connected to the Southern Gas Corridor, thus taking natural gas from Turkmenistan to Central Europe.

Location
- Country: Turkmenistan; Azerbaijan
- Direction: East–west
- Start: Türkmenbaşy
- Passes through: Caspian Sea
- To: Sangachal Terminal, Baku

Technical information
- Maximum discharge: 30 billion cubic metres (1.1 trillion cubic feet)

The Trans-Caspian Gas Pipeline (Azerbaijani: Transxəzər boru xətti, Turkmen: Transhazar turbaly geçiriji) is a proposed subsea pipeline between Türkmenbaşy in Turkmenistan, and Baku in Azerbaijan. According to some proposals it would also include a connection between the Tengiz Field in Kazakhstan, the Sangachal Terminal in Baku, and Türkmenbaşy. The Trans-Caspian Gas Pipeline project would transport natural gas from Turkmenistan and Kazakhstan to European Union member countries, circumventing both Russia and Iran. It would do this by feeding the Southern Gas Corridor. This project attracts significant interest since it would connect vast Turkmen gas resources to major consumers Turkey and Europe.

== History ==
=== End of 1990s ===
A project to import natural gas from Turkmenistan through a subsea pipeline was suggested in 1996 by the United States. In February 1999, the Turkmen government entered into an agreement with General Electric and Bechtel Group for a feasibility study on the proposed pipeline. In 1999, while attending the Organisation for Economic Co-operation and Development meeting in Istanbul, Turkey, Georgia, Azerbaijan and Turkmenistan signed a number of agreements concerned with construction of pipelines. However, because of Russian and Iranian opposition to the project, an unresolved legal dispute over Caspian Sea territorial boundaries and a gas discovery on Azerbaijan's Shah Deniz field, the submarine pipeline project was shelved in the summer of 2000 and only the South Caucasus Pipeline project continued.

=== 2006–2007 ===
In January 2006, as a result of the Russia-Ukraine gas dispute, interest in the Trans-Caspian Gas Pipeline project was rekindled. On 11 January 2006, Azerbaijan's prime-minister Artur Rasizade proposed to his Kazakhstan counterpart Daniyal Akhmetov that Kazakhstan gas be exported through the South Caucasus Pipeline to Turkey and from there to the European market. In March 2006, Turkmen President Saparmurat Niyazov signaled his intention to rejoin possible negotiations on the pipeline. In May 2006, during his visit to Kazakhstan, the European Commissioner for Energy Andris Piebalgs professed EU support for the construction of the Trans-Caspian pipeline. Azerbaijan's Industry and Energy Minister Natig Aliyev, while addressing an international energy conference in Baku, outlined the advantages of the Trans-Caspian gas pipeline for diversifying supplies and restraining prices. On the other hand, Russia's Industry and Energy Minister Viktor Khristenko commented that existing technical, legal, environmental and other risks relating to the trans-Caspian project are so great that it would be impossible to find an investor unless there is political backing for the project. On 12 May 2007, an agreement was signed between Russia, Kazakhstan and Turkmenistan providing for Central Asian gas to be exported to Europe through the reconstructed and expanded western branch of the Central Asia-Center gas pipeline system. This was seen as a setback for the realization of the Trans-Caspian Pipeline although Turkmen President Gurbanguly Berdimuhamedow said that the Trans-Caspian pipeline project was not canceled.

=== 2008 ===
On 4 September 2008, Iran's deputy foreign minister Mehti Safari confirmed that Tehran opposes the construction of any undersea pipelines in the Caspian because of environmental concerns. This jeopardizes the Trans-Caspian Gas pipeline project, according to regional expert Paul Goble.However, on 22 December 2008 Austria's OMV and Germany's RWE, both partners in Nabucco Gas Pipeline International GmbH, announced they were setting up a joint venture named the Caspian Energy Company, to carry out exploration for a gas pipeline across the Caspian Sea that would feed into the Nabucco pipeline. Based on exploration outcomes the company plans to build and operate a gas transport system across the Caspian Sea.

=== 2011–2012 ===
On 12 September 2011, the EU Foreign Affairs Council agreed to give a negotiating mandate to the European Commission for negotiations with Azerbaijan and Turkmenistan on the Trans-Caspian Gas Pipeline. On 3 September 2012, after the meeting between the European Commissioner for Energy Günther Oettinger, Turkish Energy Minister Taner Yıldız, and Azerbaijani and Turkmenistani officials in Ashgabat, Yıldız stated that Turkey will buy gas from Turkmenistan through the Trans-Caspian Gas Pipeline.

=== 2013–2014 ===
An EU proposal generally named the Southern Gas Corridor project kindled interest in the Trans+Caspian pipeline as an alternative supply route to Gasprom monopoly to European Union markets. Turkmen gas would be carried along with Azeri gas from the Shah Deniz Gas Field by this pipeline.

=== 2015–2016 ===
One part of the Southern Gas Corridor was laid between Greece and Italy via Albania (TAP Pipeline) starting in 2016. This pipeline was ultimately connected to the TANAP Pipeline across Turkey, construction of which began in 2015, and was designed to connect to the South Caucasus Pipeline at the Georgian border with Turkey. In addition, the East-West gas pipeline in Turkmenistan, connecting gas fields in the east of the country to the Caspian coast, was completed in December 2015.

=== 2020 ===
In December 2020 the Southern Gas Corridor began operating, creating an opportunity for offtake of gas from a putative Transcaspian gas pipeline.

=== 2021 ===
In June 2021 the Turkmenistan government official media outlet Golden Age stated

External conditions for construction of Trans-Caspian gas pipeline of the total length of 300 km between Turkmen and Azeri coasts of Caspian Sea have become more favorable in the last years. Signing of the Convention on Legal Status of the Caspian Sea by five Caspian states on August 12, 2018 was very important. Another obstacle was covered on January 21 this year when the Memorandum of Understanding on joint exploration and development of hydrocarbon resources of Dostluk offshore field has been signed between the governments of Turkmenistan and Azerbaijan. The document has been already ratified by the Parliament of Turkmenistan.

== Description ==
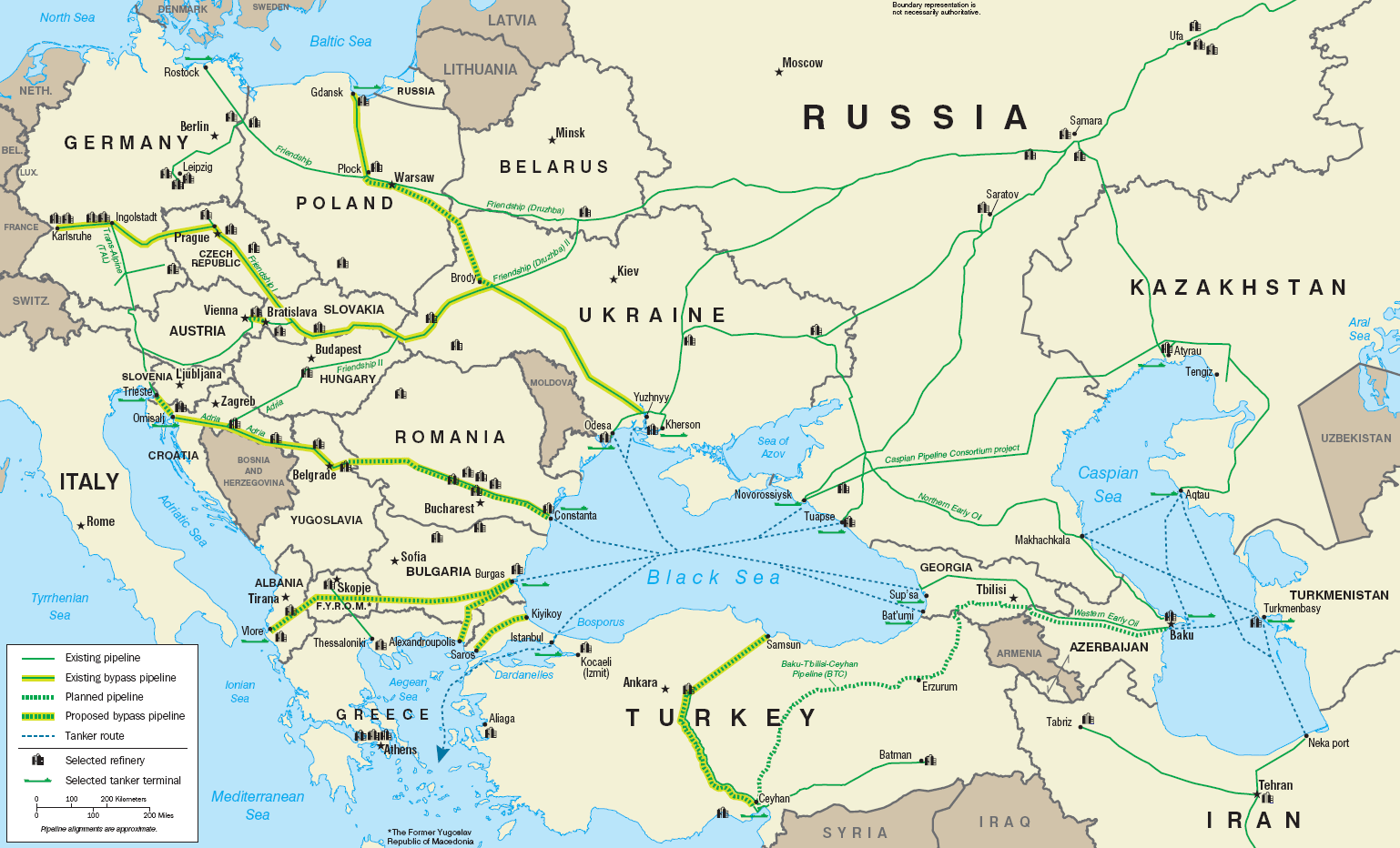
Petroleum pipelines to Europe

The projected capacity of the pipeline is 30 billion cubic metres (1.1 trillion cubic feet) of natural gas per year at an estimated cost of US$5 billion. In Baku, it would link to the South Caucasus Pipeline (Baku-Tbilisi-Erzurum pipeline), and through this with the planned Trans-Anatolian gas pipeline. A feasibility study for the project funded by the United States Trade and Development Agency is carried out by Granherne, a subsidiary of KBR.

== Critics ==
The project is heavily criticized by Russia and Iran, previously significant transit countries for Turkmen gas and current competitors. Alexander Golovin, special envoy on Caspian issues, has stated that a major gas pipeline would pose a serious, dangerous risk to the prosperity of the entire region. According to the Russian Natural Resources Ministry, any gas or oil pipelines across the floor of the Caspian Sea would be environmentally unacceptable. Russia has also taken the legal position that a potential pipeline project, regardless of the route it takes on the seabed, would require the consent of all five Caspian littoral states in order to proceed. Iran has pointed out that treaties signed by Iran and the Soviet Union in 1921 and 1940 are still in force and that any action taken without the consent of all the littoral states would be illegal. In regard of the decision taken by the EU on 12 September 2011, Russia expressed its "disappointment" as it "seems to have been adopted without taking into account the internationally accepted legal and geopolitical situation in the Caspian basin," and as Caspian Sea littoral state, Russia could veto any international agreement allowing for the pipeline to be built.

In reaction to the 1999 plans for a Trans-Caspian gas pipeline Russia and Iran collaborated in calling for a Central Asian gas cartel in 2001 and 2002. There was also a concern in the West that closer collaboration between Georgia and Azerbaijan would isolate Armenia and tempt it to strengthen ties with Russia and Iran.

In 2022 proponents of a rival pipeline between offshore installations said that the Trans-Caspian was not financially viable as the EU would not agree to a decades long contract as they are doing an energy transition.

== See also ==
- Framework Convention for the Protection of the Marine Environment of the Caspian Sea
- South Caucasus Pipeline
- Nabucco Pipeline
- Shah Deniz gas field
- Trans-Afghanistan Pipeline
- Trans-Caspian Oil Pipeline
- Energy policy of Russia
- Russia-Belarus energy dispute
- Uzbekneftegaz
- SOCAR
