= Southern Gas Corridor =

Caspian–European pipeline project

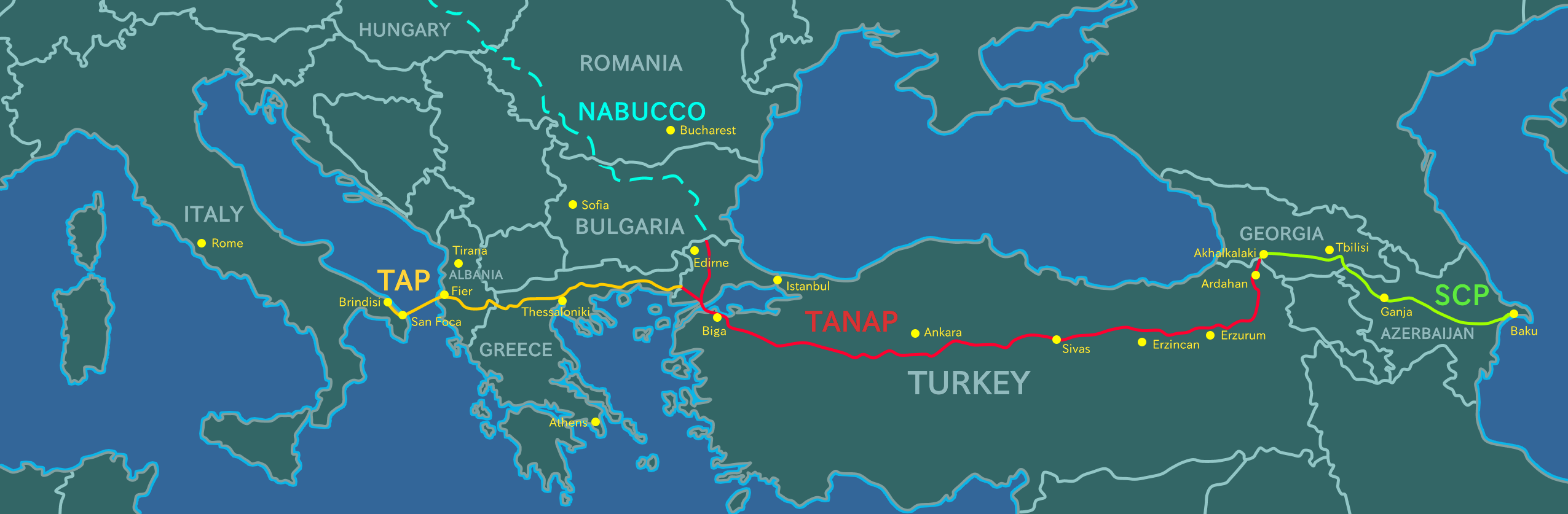
The layout of the different pipelines in the Southern Gas Corridor

The Southern Gas Corridor is an initiative of the European Commission for a natural gas supply route from the Caspian and Middle Eastern regions to Europe, proposed in 2008. The goal of the Southern Gas Corridor is to reduce Europe's dependency on Russian gas and add diverse sources of energy supply. The route from Azerbaijan to Europe consists of the South Caucasus Pipeline, the Trans-Anatolian Pipeline, and the Trans Adriatic Pipeline. The total investment of this route is estimated at US$35 billion. The main supply source would be the Shah Deniz gas field, located in the Caspian Sea.

== History ==
The European Union is heavily dependent on energy imports; in 2026, around 57% of the EU's gross inland energy consumption came from imported sources. Russia has been the main supplier, despite its decline in natural gas, coal, and crude oil for a number of years. Russia's geopolitical disputes with transit countries are another reason for concern regarding the reliance on the country's imports.

The initiative was proposed in the European Commission's Communication "Second Strategic Energy Review – An EU Energy Security and Solidarity Action Plan" (COM/2008/781) in 2008. The European Union identified a number of partner countries for this initiative, such as Azerbaijan, Turkey, Georgia, Turkmenistan, Kazakhstan, Iraq, Egypt, and Mashriq countries. Uzbekistan and Iran are expected to represent, when political conditions permit, a further significant supply source for the EU.

There have been numerous conferences revolving around the project. On 8 May 2009, the summit "Southern Corridor – New Silk Road" was held in Prague, addressing the purpose of the corridor. In 2015, a Southern Gas Corridor Conference was hosted at the University of Houston. Representatives from gas companies, consulates, and other organizational authorities participated in developing relations and calculating productions. The countries that were represented at the conference were the United States, Azerbaijan, Turkey, Greece, and Italy.

The fourth meeting of the ministers within the Southern Gas Corridor Advisory Council was held in Baku on 15 February 2018. Albania and Azerbaijan agreed to establish a new company to create the Ionian - Adriatic Pipeline (IAP). SOCAR and Albgaz company of Albania, as well as gas distributing companies of neighboring countries such as Montenegro and Croatia signed two documents related to design of new pipelines. This project will connect to the Southern Gas Corridor.

The opening ceremony of the Southern Gas Corridor took place at the Sangachal Terminal with the participation of President Ilham Aliyev on 29 May 2018.

The opening ceremony of the Trans-Anatolian gas pipeline took place in Eskisehir, Turkey, with the participation of presidents of Azerbaijan, Turkey and Ukraine on 12 June 2018.

On 15 November 2020, the Trans Adriatic Pipeline began commercial operations.

== Technical description ==
In the Trans-European Networks – Energy (TEN–E) program, the European Union designated three of the pipelines as of strategic importance (ITGI, Nabucco and White Stream)." Also the Trans Adriatic Pipeline was identified at that time as a Southern Corridor project. It was planned that the Southern Corridor projects could provide the necessary transportation capacity to deliver 60–120 billion cubic metres per annum (2.1–4.2 trillion cubic feet per annum) of Caspian and Central Asian gas directly to Europe.

As of 2017, the corridor would pass through Georgia, Turkey, Greece, Albania and Italy and consists of three main projects:

- the South Caucasus Pipeline extension (SCPx) through Azerbaijan and Georgia;
- the Trans-Anatolian Pipeline (TANAP) through Turkey;
- the Trans Adriatic Pipeline (TAP) through Greece, Albania, and Italy.

This combination of these pipelines will be nearly 3,500 kilometres (2,200 mi) long. The total cost of these projects is estimated at $45 billion.

There are other projects that fall under the SGC:

- The Shah Deniz 2 Development in the Caspian Sea;
- Expansion of the gas transmission network in Italy;
- Expansion of processing plant at Sangachal Terminal.

The project's current reserves are approximately 1.2 trillion cubic meters of gas and 2.2 billion barrels of condensate.

== Financing ==
=== European Investment Bank ===
On 6 February 2018, The European Investment Bank (EIB) voted to hand out EUR 1.5 billion, one of Europe's largest ever loans, to one of the EU's largest fossil fuel projects, the Trans Adriatic Pipeline. The loan approval followed the release of a study demonstrating that the Southern Gas Corridor could be as emissions-intensive or even more so than coal power.

A document obtained via a freedom of information request revealed that the European Commissioner for Energy and Climate Action and the Vice President of the European Commission in charge of the Energy Union had been lobbying the EIB to green-light loans to TAP and the eastern section of the Southern Gas Corridor, the Trans Anatolian Pipeline.

=== Involvement of other financial institutions and stakeholders ===
The European Bank for Reconstruction and Development (EBRD) already approved three loans for the Shah Deniz stage 2 gas field (US$200 million, US$250 million and US$100 million) as well as a US$500 million loan for TANAP, and stated its financial support to TAP could amount to EUR 1.2 billion. On top of US$250 million for Shah Deniz stage II (as part of a package with the EBRD and commercial banks), the Asian Development Bank (ADB) approved in December 2016 an additional US$1 billion for the Shah Deniz II gas field. The World Bank approved two US$400 million loans for Turkey and Azerbaijan for TANAP. The World Bank's Multilateral Investment Guarantee Agency (MIGA) approved a guarantee of up to US$950 million for TANAP against the risk of non-honoring of a sovereign financial obligation. The Asian Infrastructure Investment Bank (AIIB) approved a US$600 million loan for TANAP at an unannounced extraordinary virtual Board meeting on 21 December. (The AIIB's project summary also states the combined EIB and EBRD support for TANAP as US$2.1 billion, which suggests that, like the EIB, the EBRD is considering EUR 1 billion for TANAP.)

Currently, the Azerbaijani government (Ministry of Economy of the Republic of Azerbaijan) owns 51% of the Southern Gas Corridor; the other 49% is owned by State Oil Company of Azerbaijan Republic (SOCAR).

As of 2017, The World Bank supplied a US$400 million loan to BP, a major shareholder and operator of Shah Deniz JV. The Asian Development Bank has stated its planned financing of US$600 million towards TANAP.

As of 2017, the European Investment Bank (EIB) was considering a €2 million contribution towards the TAP.

== Controversies ==
=== Gas demand ===
Between 2010 and 2015, gas demand in the European Union decreased more than 20%. At the same time, gas projects are evaluated with a more than 70% higher gas demand scenario in 2030. By 2021, gas consumption only returned to about 2010 levels.

The EU has an overall surplus of gas import infrastructure and many of import capacities are underutilized. On the other hand, the EU goals for energy efficiency would reduce gas demand in the next years. The EU had set itself a 20% energy savings target by 2020 when compared to the projected use of energy in 2020.

=== European Climate Policy ===
The key targets of the EU on climate policy by 2030 are at least 40% cut in greenhouse gas emissions compared with 1990, 27% of total energy consumption from renewable energy and 27% increase in energy efficiency. According to the International Energy Agency, "no more than one-third of proven reserves of fossil fuels can be consumed prior to 2050 if the world is to achieve the 2 °C goal". The European Investment Bank has stated its commitment to control climate change, yet is still aiming to finance the corridor.

=== Diversification ===
With the SGC, one of the goals on the EU is to diversify natural gas supply routes and reduce dependency from Russia. Russia supplied about one third of the EU gas consumption in 2013, mainly through Gazprom. However, the European Bank for Reconstruction and Development (EBRD) is to lend US$200 million to Lukoil to develop the Shah Deniz gas field in Azerbaijan. The Russian company Lukoil, whose CEO is an Azerbaijani businessman Vagit Alekperov, owns 10% of the field.

=== Supporting the Azerbaijani government ===
Building SGC, European countries and companies support gas export from Azerbaijan and contribute to finance Azerbaijan's government. Many critics, watchdog groups and Non-governmental organizations (NGOs) have criticized the Azerbaijani government as repressive or authoritarian, and also assert activists and journalists are regularly arrested on false charges and imprisoned. The International Federation for Human Rights (FIDH) wrote in 2015, that "for more than a decade Azerbaijan has made shameless use of caviar diplomacy to charm European governments, its most important oil and gas clients". The CEE BankWatch warns that "Developing Shah Deniz stage 2 and the Southern Gas Corridor is likely to cement further the oppressive structures of the Aliyev government".

According to the reports prepared by European Strategic Intelligence and Security Center (ESISC) on March and April 2017, the publication of such information serves to create a climate against some countries including Azerbaijan to benefit Armenia which is led by different NGO's and its connections within the Council of Europe. In these reports, such activities of that Armenian connection are regarded as unilateral and biased hiding private interests of the network behind the purview of the defense of human rights, but the activity of the ESISC itself is characterized as a part of the Azerbaijani propaganda (see European strategic intelligence and security center).

Over ten European media organizations have jointly investigated the Azerbaijani government, and have accused officials of laundering money to the United Kingdom. Dubbed the "Azerbaijani Laundromat", this scheme allegedly consisted of sending 2.5 billion euros to European politician and Azerbaijani elites; the money was also used to purchase luxury goods. One of the reasons why the laundering took place was because the Azerbaijani government needed to keep a positive image in Europe to gain support for the Southern Gas Corridor. The corridor is a main reason for the laundering and can explain the government's heavy lobbying at the European level. As a result of the scandal, more than 80 human right activists and opposing politicians were arrested and jailed in Azerbaijan.

== Outside opinion and protests ==
The Southern Gas Corridor received mixed reactions from the public, and has been the target of many protests and petitions around the world. In Italy, there had been protests concerning the corridor and its damage to the environment. In March 2017, environmentalists protested against the removal of historical olive groves; this centuries-old grove was blocking the path of the TAP. Protesters blocked the construction site to prevent trucks and supplies from entering. Police involvement was involved, and broke up 300 protesters. More than 60 olive trees have already been removed since the protest, to the locals' dismay.

More than 25 NGOs wrote a letter to the EIB Board of Directors and the bank's president, asking for the European Investment Bank to stop funding the TANAP due to the human rights violations the project has caused. The letter states that the Azerbaijani government has used forms of torture, imprisonment, and disruption to protesters, journalists, and other politicians; human rights monitors have also not been able to enter Azerbaijan.
