= TANAP (disambiguation) =

TANAP may refer to:

- Tatra National Park, Slovakia
- Trans-Anatolian gas pipeline

== See also ==
- Tanzania National Parks Authority (TANAPA)
