= Claude Moniquet =

French journalist (born 1958)

Claude Moniquet (born 3 March 1958 in Brussels, Belgium) is a retired French journalist (working mainly with L'Express and Quotidien de Paris) and a former intelligence agent at the French Directorate-General for External Security (DGSE), operating extensively in eastern Europe and the Balkans.

He is co-founder and CEO of the European Strategic Intelligence and Security Center (ESISC).

Born to a Belgian father and a French mother, he was a far-left militant until the age of 19. A few years later, he spent two years living on a kibbutz in Israel. He now describes himself as being politically to the right.

He began his career as a journalist specialising in eastern Europe, especially Poland. In the early 1980s, he was contacted by the DGSE due to his contacts in Poland. Until the early 2000s, he worked simultaneously as a journalist and an intelligence agent.

He is the co-founder and director of the European Strategic Intelligence and Security Center (ESISC), a strategic analysis, economic intelligence and lobbying agency based in Brussels.

In 2019, he was the head candidate of the newly formed right-wing Destexhe List for the Brussels regional elections, which got no seat. Like the leader of this new party, Claude Moniquet is known for his connections with Azerbaijani caviar diplomacy and receiving financial means to promote Azerbaijani interests.

He is a regular consultant of French tv channel cNews.

== Books ==
- Daech, la main du diable, 2016
