= Enagás =

Spanish energy company

Enagás, S.A.

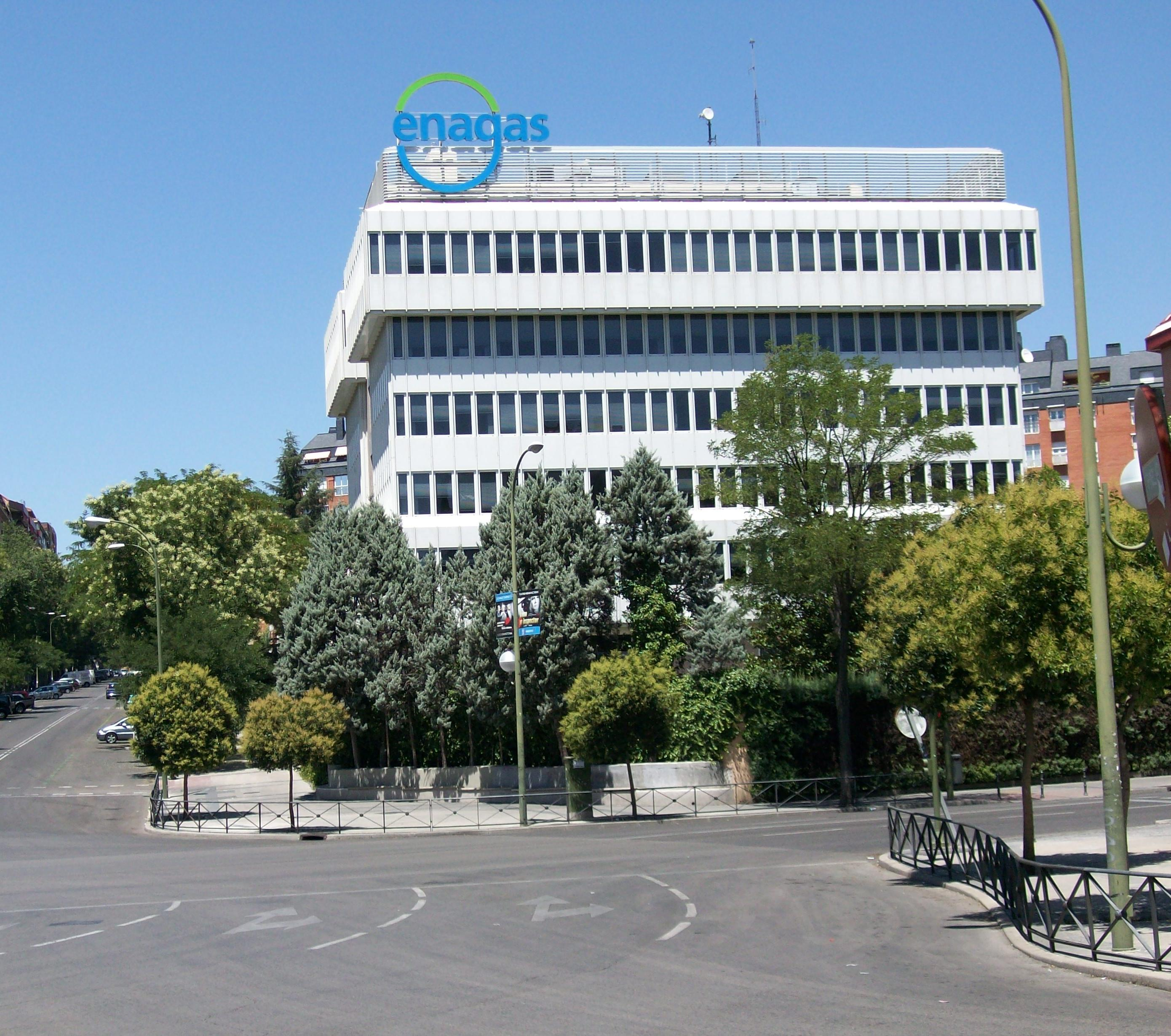
- Headquarters in Madrid, Spain
- Type: Public
- Traded as: BMAD: ENG; IBEX 35 component
- ISIN: ES0130960018
- Industry: Energy industry
- Founded: 1972; 54 years ago
- Headquarters: Madrid, Spain
- Key people: Antonio Llardén Carratalá (chairman); Arturo Gonzalo Aizpiri (CEO)
- Products: Storage and transportation of natural gas
- Revenue: ▲€1.360 billion (2017)
- Operating income: ▲€732,072 million (2017)
- Net income: ▲€490,837 million (2017)
- Number of employees: ▲1,439 (2017)
- Website: www.enagas.com

Enagás, S.A. (Spanish pronunciation: [enaˈɣas], originally an initialism for Empresa Nacional del Gas) is a Spanish energy company and European transmission system operator (TSO), which owns and operates the nation's gas grid. The firm also owns four liquefied natural gas regasification terminals in the country, at Huelva, Barcelona, Cartagena, and Gijón. In addition, it owns 50% of the plant BBG (Bilbao) and 72.5% of the Saggas terminal in Sagunto. The chairman of Enagás is Antonio Llardén Carratalá and his chief executive officer is Arturo Gonzalo Aizpiri.

The firm's headquarters are located in Madrid. Apart from Spain, Enagás has presence in Mexico, Perú, Chile, Sweden and in the Trans Adriatic Pipeline (TAP) European project.

The company was founded in 1972 by the Spanish Government with the aim of creating a nationwide network of gas pipelines. After privatisation in 1994, Gas Natural acquired a controlling stake in the company. Since Enagás demerged in 2002, Gas Natural gradually decreased its stake to 5%, the maximum allowed for any shareholder by the Government after 30 December 2006. As of 2006, the institutional shareholder was the state-owned holding company Sociedad Estatal de Participaciones Industriales (SEPI) which held 5% of Enagás.

Since 2019, 90% of the company's shares are on the open market (free float).

In September 2023, it was announced Enagás has finalised the acquisition of 10% of the shares in the Hamburg LNG and green gases import terminal, Hanseatic Energy Hub GmbH.

== MidCat pipeline project ==
The MidCat gas pipeline was a 2010s concept, promoted by Enagás and French gas operator Teréga, to build a large gas pipeline between France and the Catalonia region of eastern Spain.

In 2011, the €3.1 billion MidCat gas pipeline project was kicked off. The first section near Barcelona was built in 2011–2012. However, the project came to a halt after just €7 million in EU support had been expended for prestudies for the project.

The first part of the pipeline called the South Transit East Pyrenees, or STEP, was to continue the existing line near Barcelona into France for about €440 million, paid mostly by the French partner Teréga (formerly TIGF — Transport et Infrastructures Gaz France). Construction was to start in 2019, and be completed by 2022. The second half of MidCat was to reinforce about 800 km of pipelines within France. A 2017 EU report found that MidCat's costs were higher than its assumed benefits.

The MidCat was later on called BarMar (Barcelona-Marseille) and will finally become part of the H2MED, a hydrogen pipeline transport.

On 15 December 2022 it submitted to the call for Projects of Community Interest (PCI) the first two axes of the Spanish Hydrogen Backbone Network project (the Vía de la Plata Axis and the Cantabrian Coast Axis) together with the two subway storage facilities (in Cantabria, of 335 GWh, and the Basque Country, of 240 GWh) that have been identified as necessary for its correct operation.
