= European Strategic Intelligence and Security Center =

Think tank and lobby group

The European Strategic Intelligence and Security Center (ESISC) is a European think tank and lobbying group dealing with issues related to terrorism and security. It is operated by Claude Moniquet, a French journalist. It has been accused of lobbying on the behalf of foreign governments, including Azerbaijan and Morocco.

== History ==
ESISC was founded in April 2002 by Claude Moniquet. In 2019, the ESISC website listed staff members from Russia, Morocco, Italy, and Belgium. In 2018, Claude Moniquet announced that ESISC had entered into a collaboration with the Washington Strategic Intelligence Center (WSIC), "a new American think-tank."

== Election observers ==
Representatives of ESISC participated in 2013 Azerbaijani presidential elections and 2015 parliamentary elections as observers. They evaluated the elections positively and criticized the assessments of the OSCE/ODIHR mission, in which the elections were recognized as inappropriate to democratic norms.

== Reports ==
=== Report on Western Sahara ===
In 2005 and again in 2008 and 2010 ESISC issued reports on Western Sahara that dovetailed closely with official Moroccan views and claimed that there existed a link between Al Qaeda and the nationalist group Polisario, which seeks Western Sahara's independence from Morocco. Western Sahara expert Jacob Mundy described ESISC's publications as "think tank reports paid for by the [Moroccan] royal palace" to discredit Polisario.

Le Journal Hebdomadaire, a leading Moroccan independent weekly, published an article critical of the first ESISC report and noted that it reflected the official views of the Moroccan government. Moniquet then sued the newspaper in a Moroccan court, which ordered Le Journal Hebdomadaire to pay him 360,000 dollars. Unable to pay the fine, Le Journal Hebdomadaire was closed, in what Mundy termed the conclusion of a "successful five-year campaign to drive one of [Morocco's] few independent media voices out of existence". According to Moroccan journalists, this was the largest-ever fine against the media in Morocco, and the Committee to Protect Journalists noted major irregularities in the trial. Another press freedom organization, Reporters Without Borders (RSF), described the trial as “politically motivated and unfair.” Human Rights Watch also voiced concern over the trial, while Freedom House termed the lawsuit "a politically motivated effort to bankrupt the magazine."

Social anthropologist of the Sahara Desert, Konstantina Isidoros, said that in both 2005 and 2008, ESISC issued two near-identical reports proclaiming distorted truths that Polisario is evolving to new fears terrorism, radical Islamism or international crime. According Isidoros "lies appear to play some peculiar importance in this report"

=== Republic of Azerbaijan: a model of good governance ===
A month before the 2013 Azerbaijani presidential elections, ESISC issued a report entitled “The Republic of Azerbaijan: a model of good governance”. According to Robert Coalson, a correspondent of Radio Free Europe, the "haphazardly edited" and "ungrammatical" report praised the stable social welfare" and the situation for women and religious minorities in Azerbaijan. Noting that the ESISC website advertises "customized reports, analysis, and [...] briefings responding exactly to the needs of each client in his or her sector of activity," Coalson accused ESISC of operating as a "front" for Azerbaijan." In 2026, Giovanni Natalizio, PhD, published a methodological report on the ESISC–Coalson controversy, arguing that Coalson’s accusations required a more rigorous evidentiary distinction between documented criticism of Azerbaijan’s governance and the separate claim that ESISC operated as a “front think tank”. According to the “Freedom Files Analytical Center”, ESISC lobbies for Azerbaijan's interests and provides services of “false observers,” whose task is to participate in the elections of autocratic states as observers, inform on a democratic vote, and criticize the OSCE/ ODIHR observation mission.

=== The Armenian Connection ===
In its 2017 report "The Armenian Connection", the ESISC claimed that human rights organisations were attempting to take over the Council of Europe "in the interests of George Soros and Armenia" in order to attack Azerbaijan. The Freedom Files Analytical Center described The Armenian Connection as propaganda and seeking to stop criticism of Azerbaijan's lobbying and corruption, and its claims as "absurd". The European Stability Initiative stated that “the ESISC report is full of lies”.
