= South Caucasus Pipeline =

Natural gas pipeline in Azerbaijan, Georgia, and Turkey

- Location of the South Caucasus Pipeline

Location
- Country: Azerbaijan; Georgia; Turkey
- Direction: East–west
- Start: Baku (Sangachal Terminal), Azerbaijan
- Passes through: Tbilisi
- To: Erzurum, Turkey
- Runs alongside: Baku–Tbilisi–Ceyhan pipeline

General information
- Type: Natural gas
- Partners: BP (29.99%); Lukoil (19.99%); TPAO (19.00%); SOCAR (14.35%); NICO (10.00%); SGC Upstream (6.67%)
- Operator: BP
- Commissioned: 2006

Technical information
- Length: 692 km (430 mi)
- Maximum discharge: 24 billion cubic metres per annum (850×10^{9} cu ft/a)
- Diameter: 42 in (1,067 mm)

The South Caucasus Pipeline (also known as the Baku–Tbilisi–Erzurum Pipeline, BTE pipeline, or Shah Deniz Pipeline) is a natural gas pipeline from the Shah Deniz gas field in the Azerbaijan sector of the Caspian Sea to Turkey. It runs parallel to the Baku–Tbilisi–Ceyhan oil pipeline.

== History ==
On 21 May 2006, the commissioning gas was pumped to the pipeline from the Sangachal Terminal. First deliveries through the pipeline commenced on 30 September 2006. Deliveries of gas from Shah Deniz gas field started on 15 December 2006.

On 12 August 2008, the pipeline operator BP briefly closed the pipeline for safety reasons because of the South Ossetia conflict, resuming supply two days later.

== Description ==
The 42-inch (1,070 mm) diameter gas pipeline runs through the same corridor as the Baku–Tbilisi–Ceyhan pipeline until Erzurum, where BTC turns south to the Mediterranean. It is 692 kilometres (430 mi) long, of which 442 kilometres (275 mi) is in Azerbaijan and 248 kilometres (154 mi) in Georgia. The initial capacity of the pipeline was 8.8 billion cubic metres (310 billion cubic feet) of gas per year. For the second stage of the Shah Deniz development, the capacity was increased up to 24 billion cubic metres (850 billion cubic feet) by adding additional looping and two new compressor stations, costing $3 billion. As the pipeline has the potential to be connected to Turkmen and Kazakh producers through the planned Trans-Caspian Gas Pipeline, Azerbaijan has proposed expanding its capacity up to 60 billion cubic metres (2.1 trillion cubic feet) by building a second line of the pipeline.

== Economic impact ==
The first aim of the pipeline is to supply Turkey and Georgia. As a transit country, Georgia has rights to take 5% of the annual gas flow through the pipeline in lieu of a tariff and can purchase a further 0.5 billion cubic metres (18 billion cubic feet) of gas a year at a discounted price. It supplies Europe with Caspian natural gas through the Southern Gas Corridor pipelines, through the Trans Adriatic Pipeline and Trans-Anatolian gas pipeline.

== Project company ==
The pipeline is owned by the South Caucasus Pipeline Company, a consortium led by BP. As of 2022, the shareholders of the consortium are:

- BP (UK) 29.99%
- Lukoil (Russia) 19.99%
- TPAO (Turkey) 19.00%
- SOCAR (Azerbaijan) 14.35%
- NICO (Iran) 10.00%
- SGC Upstream (Azerbaijan) 6.67%

The technical operator of the pipeline is BP, and the commercial operator was Statoil. According to the PSA agreement, the commercial operatorship of the SCP was transferred to SOCAR starting on 1 January 2015.

== South Caucasus Pipeline expansion (SCPx) ==
As a part of the Shah Deniz Full Field Development (FFD), otherwise called the Shahdeniz-2 project, BP will expand the pipeline through capacity extension by putting two additional compressor stations in Georgia and Turkey. This will almost triple the current transportation capacity of the pipeline up to 20 bcm/year.

This capacity increase would be able to accommodate an additional 16 bcm of gas coming from the SD-2 project.

The SCPX follows the line of the earlier BTC and SCP pipelines across Azerbaijan. The project included an archaeological programme and supplemented the discoveries of the earlier two projects.

== See also ==
- Baku–Tbilisi–Ceyhan pipeline
- Nabucco Pipeline
- Shah Deniz gas field
- Trans-Caspian Gas Pipeline
- Southern Gas Corridor
- TANAP
- Energy in Georgia (country)
