= Trans Adriatic Pipeline =

Greece to Italy gas pipeline

- Map of Trans Adriatic Pipeline

Location
- Country: Greece; Albania; Italy
- Direction: East-West
- Start: Kipoi, Evros, Greece
- Passes through: Fier, Albania
- To: Melendugno

General information
- Type: Natural gas
- Partners: BP (20%); SOCAR (20%); Snam (20%); Fluxys (20%); Enagás (20%)
- Operator: Trans Adriatic Pipeline AG
- Construction started: 2016
- Commissioned: 2020

Technical information
- Length: 878 km (546 mi)
- Maximum discharge: 10–20 billion cubic metres per annum (3.5×10^{11}–7.1×10^{11} cu ft/a)
- Diameter: 48 and 36 in (1,219 and 914 mm)
- Website: www.tap-ag.com

The Trans Adriatic Pipeline (TAP; Albanian: Gazsjellësi Trans-Adriatik; Greek: Διαδριατικός Αγωγός Φυσικού Αερίου, romanized: Diadriatikós Agogós Fysikoú Aeríou; Italian: Gasdotto Trans-Adriatico) is a natural gas pipeline operational since 2020, running from Greece through Albania and the Adriatic Sea to Italy. It is the final section of the Southern Gas Corridor originating in Azerbaijan. As of 2022, capacity is 10 bcm per year.

The natural gas originates in the second stage of the Shah Deniz (Azerbaijan) gas field development in the Azerbaijani section of Caspian Sea flowing through the South Caucasus Pipeline and the Trans Anatolian Pipeline (TANAP). The TAP has been supported by European institutions and seen as a "Project of Common Interest" to enhance energy security and diversify gas supplies for European markets. It is operated by a Swiss joint venture and owned by BP (20%), SOCAR (20%), Snam (20%), Fluxys (20%) and Enagás (20%).

== History ==
The Trans Adriatic Pipeline project was announced in 2003 by Swiss energy company EGL Group (now named Axpo). The feasibility study was concluded in March 2006. Two options were investigated: a northern route through Bulgaria, North Macedonia and Albania, and a southern route through Greece and Albania, which finally was considered to be more feasible. In March 2007, the extended basic engineering for the pipeline was completed. Greece was opposed to having the route of the Trans Adriatic Pipeline pass through Albania, as it would allow Albania to become the transmission hub for gas in the Western Balkans.

On 13 February 2008, EGL Group and the Norwegian energy company Statoil signed an agreement to set up Trans Adriatic Pipeline AG, a joint venture to develop, build and operate the pipeline. In June 2008, the company filed an application with the Greek authorities to build a section of the pipeline from Thessaloniki to the Greek-Albanian border. In January 2009, the TAP carried out a marine survey in the Adriatic Sea to verify the offshore route. A route assessment survey in Albania started in July 2009. In March 2009, an intergovernmental agreement between Italy and Albania on energy cooperation mentioned TAP as a project of common interest for both countries. In January 2010, TAP opened country offices in Greece, Albania and Italy. In March 2010, TAP submitted an application to Italian authorities for inclusion into the Italian gas network.

On 20 May 2010, it was announced that E.ON had become a partner in the project. The deal was closed on 7 July 2010.

In November 2010, TAP started a route refinement survey in northern Greece in preparation for the environmental impact assessment. On 7 September 2011, the company submitted an EU Third Party Access Exemption applications in all three host countries, which allows TAP AG to enter into long term ship-or-pay gas transportation agreements with the shippers of Shah Deniz II gas. The exemptions were granted on 16 May 2013.

In February 2012, the Trans Adriatic Pipeline was the first project to be pre-selected and to enter exclusive negotiations with the Shah Deniz Consortium. In August 2012, consortium partners BP, SOCAR and Total S.A. signed a funding agreement with TAP's shareholders, including an option to take up to 50% equity in the project. On 22 November 2012, the TAP consortium and Trans-Anatolian gas pipeline's partners signed a memorandum of understanding that established a cooperation framework between the two parties.

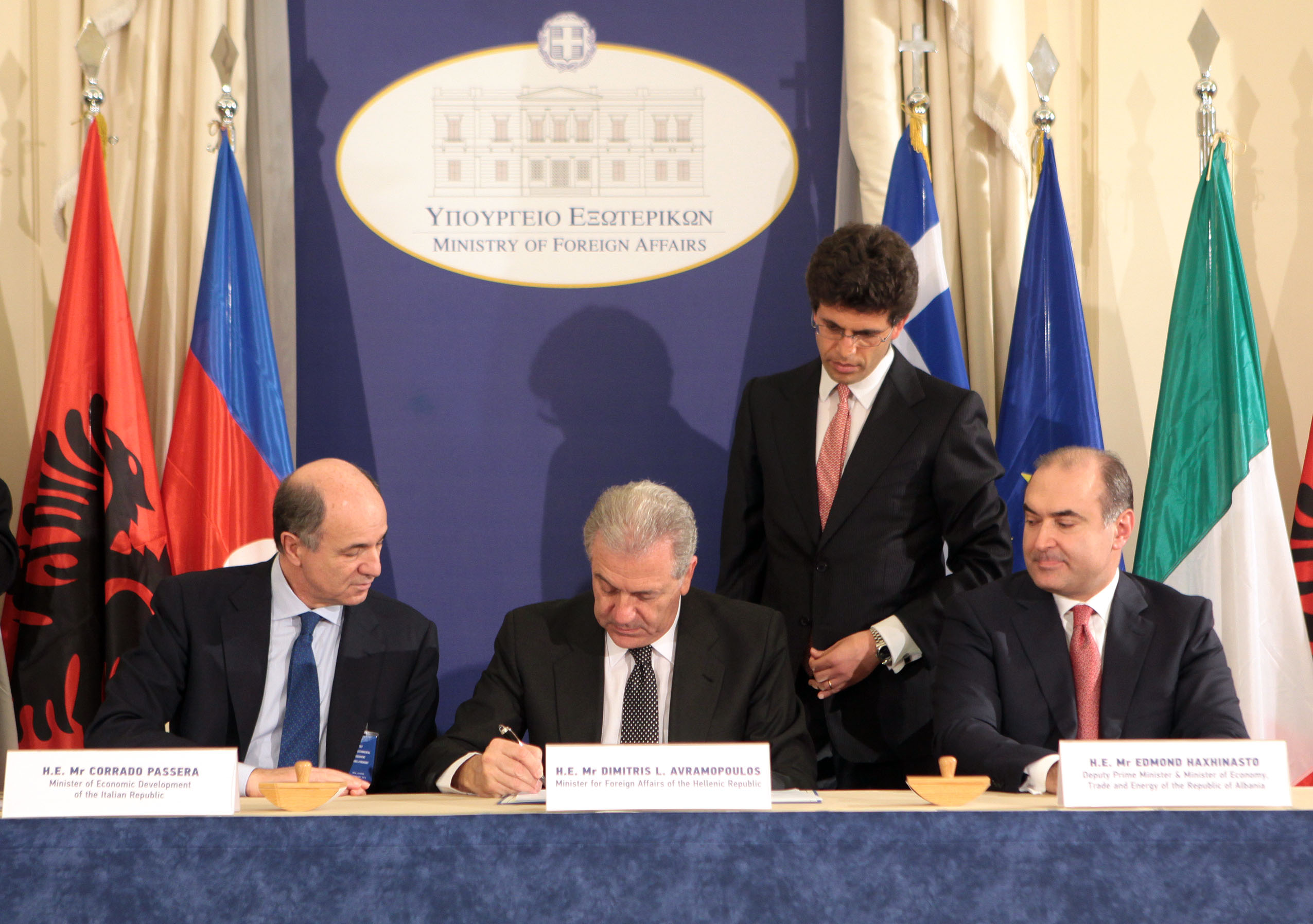
Corrado Passera (Italy), Dimitris Avramopoulos (Greece) and Edmond Haxhinasto (Albania) are signing intergovernmental agreement.

On 28 September 2012, Albania, Greece and Italy confirmed their political support for the pipeline by signing a memorandum of understanding. In February 2013, Greece, Italy and Albania signed an intergovernmental agreement.

In June 2013, the project was chosen as a route for gas from Shah Deniz II over the competing Nabucco West project. Later in 2013, BP, SOCAR, Total, and Fluxys became shareholders of the project. In September 2014, E.ON and Total sold their shares to Enagás and Fluxys. In December 2015, Snam joined TAP, acquiring Statoil's 20% interest in the project.

Construction of the pipeline started on 16 May 2016. On 15 November 2020, the pipeline began commercial operations, and the first Azerbaijani gas was delivered to Italy on 30 December 2020.

On 27 January 2023, Axpo announced the sale of its 5% shares to Enagas (4%) and Fluxys (1%). Both companies reached an ownership of 20% thanks to this transaction, on par with the other remaining shareholders.

On 30 January 2023, TAP announced that the first level of capacity expansion was triggered following the first binding phase of its 2021 market test. This expansion will add additional 1.2 billion cubic meters (bcm) of capacity per year to the project.

== Technical description ==
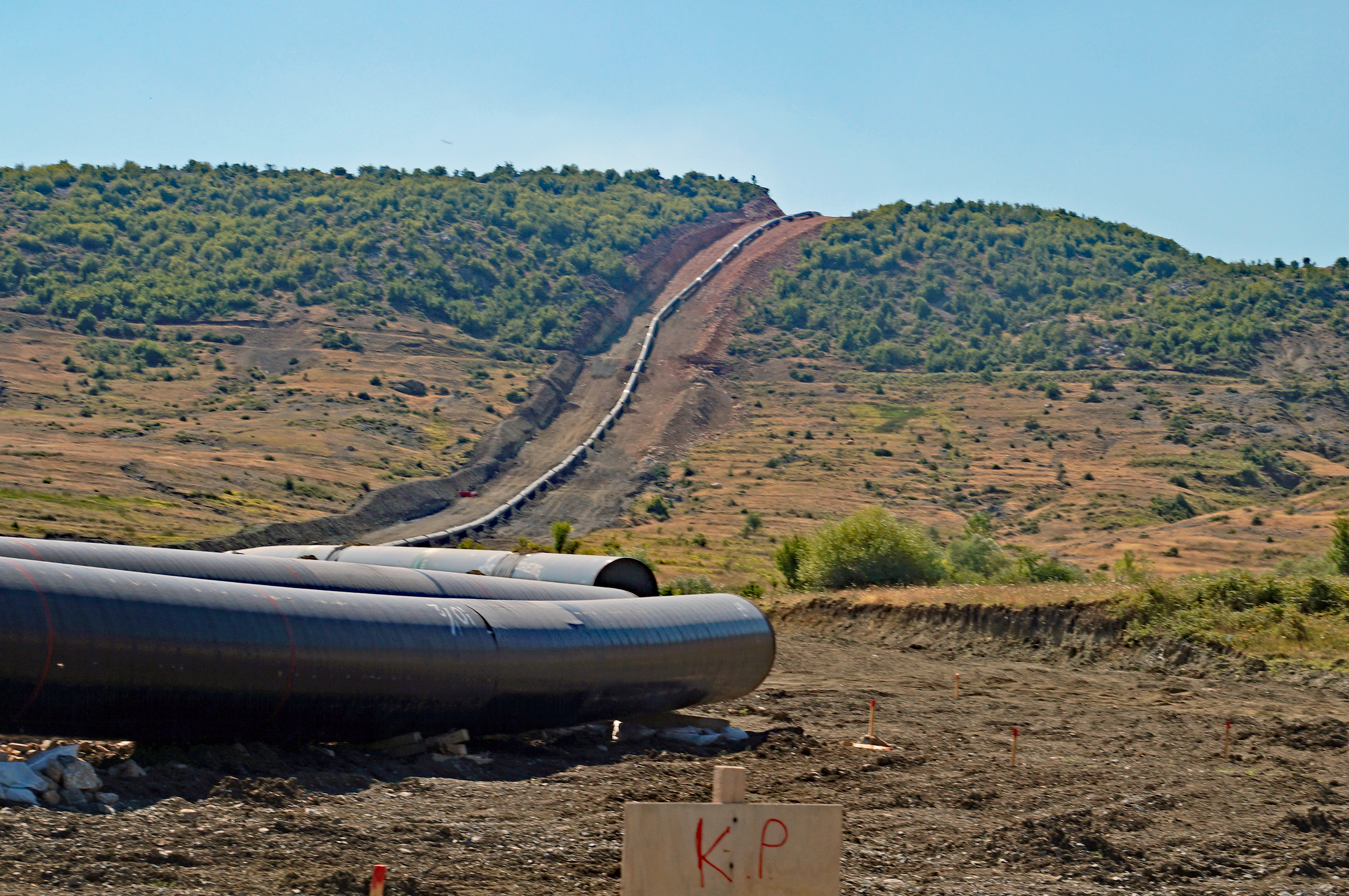
TAP west of Korçë, Albania

The pipeline starts at the Greece–Turkey border at Kipoi, Evros, where it is connected with the Trans-Anatolian gas pipeline. It crosses Greece, Albania and the Adriatic Sea and comes ashore in Italy near San Foca. The total length of the pipeline is 878 kilometres (546 mi), of which 550 kilometres (340 mi) in Greece, 215 kilometres (134 mi) in Albania, 105 kilometres (65 mi) in offshore, and 8 kilometres (5.0 mi) in Italy. The offshore leg is laid at a maximum depth of 810 metres (2,660 ft).

The initial capacity of the pipeline is 10 billion cubic metres (350 billion cubic feet) of natural gas per year, of which 8 billion cubic metres (280 billion cubic feet) is delivered to Italy, 1 billion cubic metres (35 billion cubic feet) to Greece, and 1 billion cubic metres (35 billion cubic feet) to Bulgaria. It will be expanded up to 20 billion cubic metres (710 billion cubic feet). It uses 48-inch (1,200 mm) pipes for pressure of 95 bars (9,500 kPa), 1378 psi, on the onshore section and 36-inch (910 mm) pipes for pressure of 145 bars (14,500 kPa), 2103 psi, on the offshore section.

Total construction costs were about €4.5 billion. A third of it was spent for constructing the section within Albania.

The Gas Interconnector Greece-Bulgaria (IGB) connects TAP to Greece and Bulgaria since its start of operations in October 2022.

== Project company ==
Trans Adriatic Pipeline AG is a joint venture company registered in Baar, canton Zug, Switzerland, with a purpose of planning, developing and building the TAP pipeline. The Managing Director of the company is Luca Schieppati.

Shareholders of the Trans Adriatic Pipeline are BP (20%), SOCAR (20%), Snam (20%), Fluxys (20%) and Enagás (20%).

== Protests ==
There have been incidents of protests by both local citizens and government officials against the Trans Adriatic Pipeline.

In Italy, the TAP required the construction of a gas terminal in a historical olive grove in the countryside near the Apulian town of Melendugno. The site presents some century-old olive trees which were explanted and transferred to an alternative location in an operation that cannot guarantee the trees' survival. This was criticised by the local public as well as environmentalists, also in relation to a deadly parasitic disease (Xylella fastidiosa) which has been affecting olive groves in the region for years, and can spread to previously unaffected areas with tree relocation.

Furthermore, the pipeline's landing point on the Italian coast is located under the pristine beach of San Foca, a popular destination for beachgoers. Locals and environmentalists raised safety concerns regarding millions of cubic litres of compressed flammable gas being piped only 10 metres under a beach which will be kept open to the public during the summer months.

Some government officials, such as multiple mayors from the area and the governor of the region of Apulia, also supported the environmentalists' opinion that the pipeline might cause more harm than good and could be an opportunity for local organised crime and corruption to infiltrate public tenders for construction work on the Italian side. They worried especially in relation to a taxpayer-funded 60-kilometre long interconnector which had to be built to link the TAP's Italian terminal in Melendugno to Italy's national gas network near the industrial port of Brindisi. In 2016, the Apulia Region governor Michele Emiliano told an Al Jazeera English crew that he could not understand why an alternative landing point to San Foca beach, closer to the Brindisi industrial area, was not chosen in spite of lower costs, less severe environmental impact, and proximity to pre-existing gas infrastructure.

== See also ==
- Interconnector Turkey–Greece–Italy
- Burgas–Alexandroupoli pipeline
- South Stream
- Nabucco pipeline
- Ionian Adriatic Pipeline
- TANAP
