= Odile Renaud-Basso =

French civil servant (born 1965)

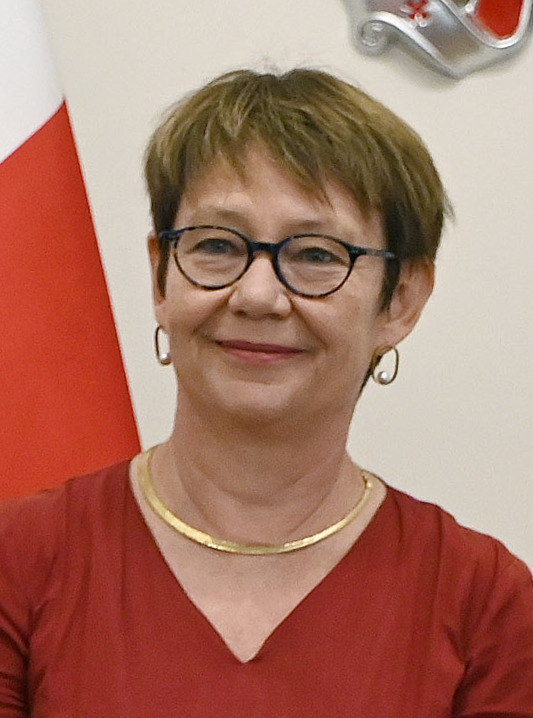
- Renaud-Basso in 2022

President of the European Bank for Reconstruction and Development
- Incumbent
- Assumed office 2 November 2020
- Preceded by: Suma Chakrabarti

Personal details
- Born: 2 June 1965 (age 60)

Odile Renaud-Basso (born 2 June 1965) is a French civil servant who has been serving as president of the European Bank for Reconstruction and Development since 2020. From 2016 to 2020, she served as head of the Direction générale du Trésor. From 2018 to 2020, she served as vice president of the Economic and Financial Committee of the European Union.
