= Trans-Anatolian gas pipeline =

Turkish natural gas pipeline

Trans-Anatolian Natural Gas Pipeline

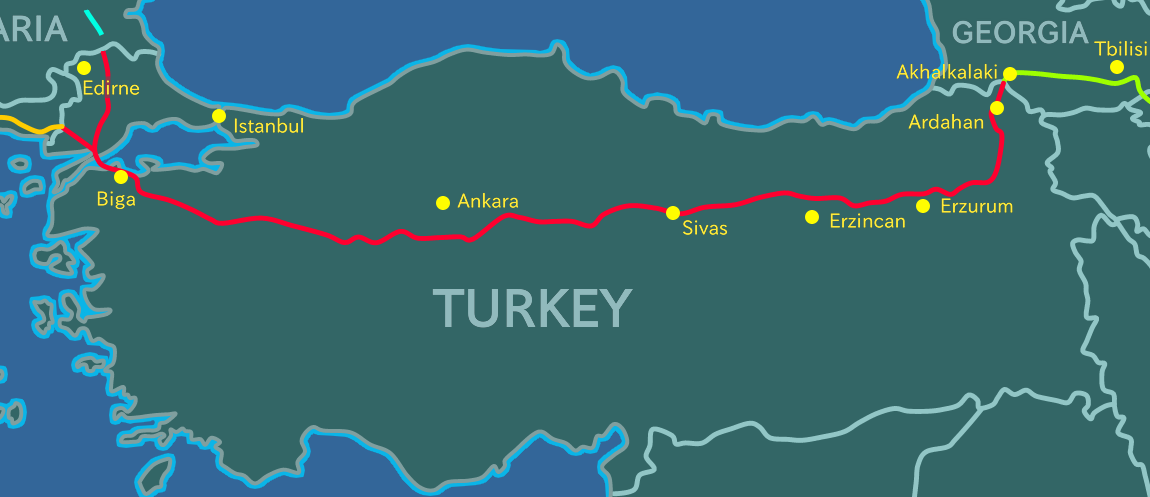
- Map of Trans-Anatolian Natural Gas Pipeline

Location
- Country: Turkey

General information
- Type: Natural gas
- Owner: TANAP project company
- Partners: SOCAR (58%); BOTAŞ (30%); BP (12%)
- Operator: SOCAR
- Construction started: 2015
- Commissioned: 2018

Technical information
- Length: 1,841 km (1,144 mi)
- Maximum discharge: 16×10^{9} m^{3} (570×10^{9} cu ft) per year
- Website: http://www.tanap.com/

The Trans-Anatolian Natural Gas Pipeline (TANAP; Azerbaijani: Trans-Anadolu Təbii Qaz Boru Kəməri, Turkish: Trans-Anadolu Doğalgaz Boru Hattı) is a natural gas pipeline in Turkey. It is the central part of the Southern Gas Corridor, which connects the giant Shah Deniz gas field in Azerbaijan to Europe through the South Caucasus Pipeline and the Trans Adriatic Pipeline. The pipeline has a strategic importance for both Azerbaijan and Turkey. It allows Azerbaijani gas exports to Europe, beyond Turkey. It also strengthens the role of Turkey as a regional energy hub.

The construction of the 1,841-kilometre (1,144 mi)-long pipeline started in March 2015, and it was inaugurated in June 2018.

== History ==
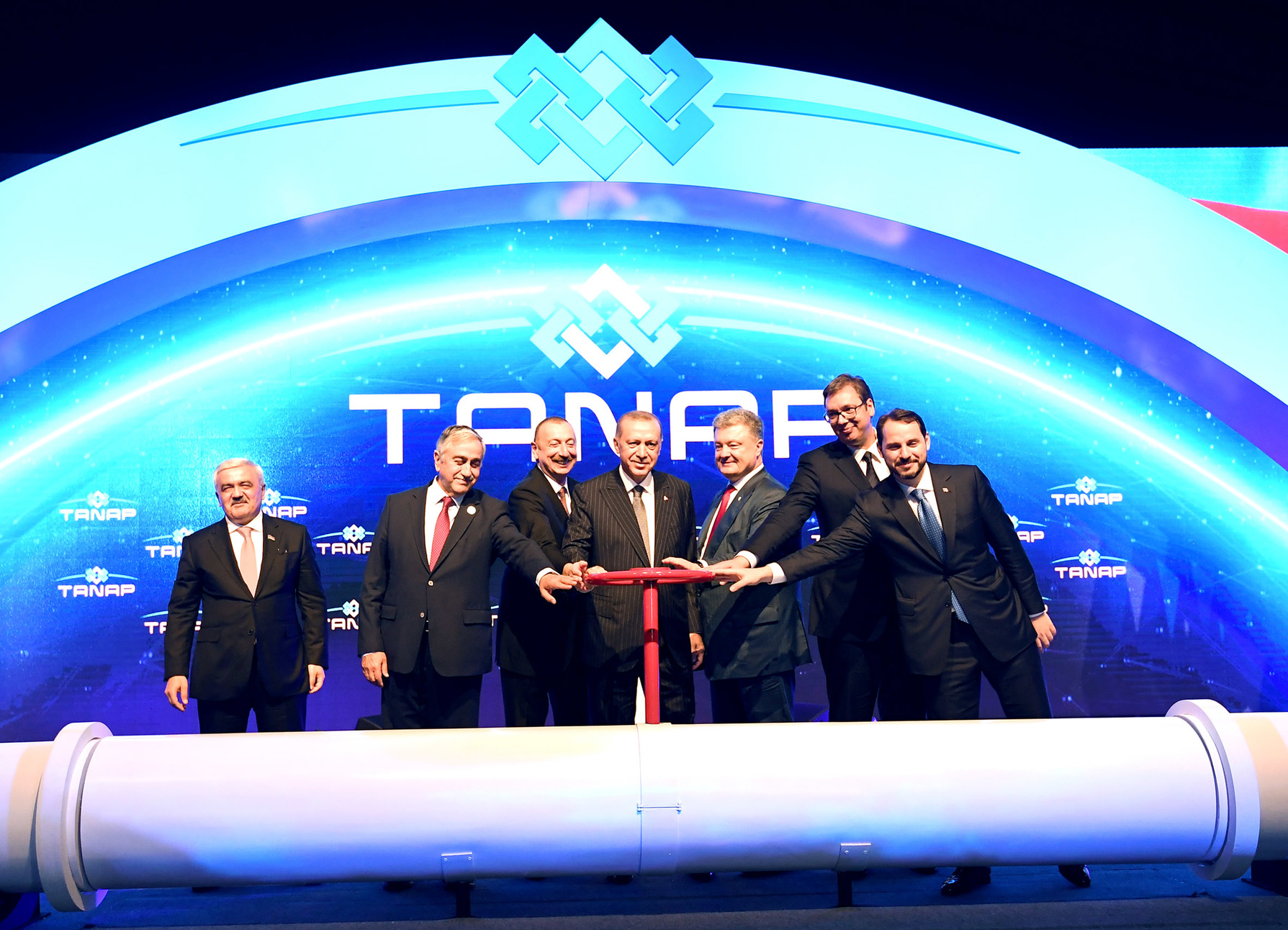
Trans-Anatolian gas pipeline inauguration at the Turkish city of Eskişehir, 12 June 2018

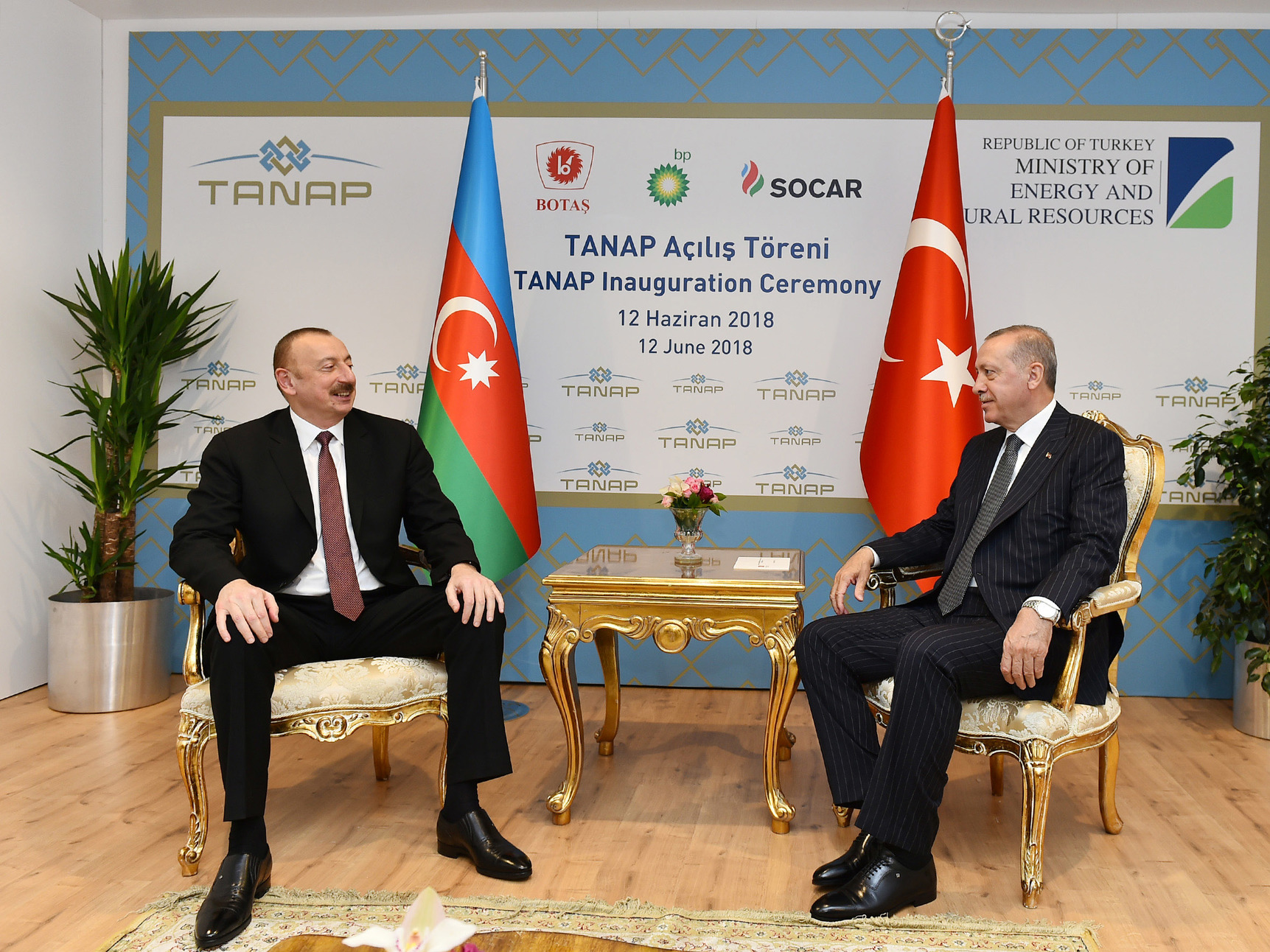
Ilham Aliyev with Recep Tayyip Erdoğan

The project was announced on 17 November 2011 at the Third Black Sea Energy and Economic Forum in Istanbul. On 26 December 2011, Turkey and Azerbaijan signed a memorandum of understanding establishing a consortium to build and operate the pipeline. At first, a film dedicated to TANAP project was demonstrated. In the film, it was emphasized that TANAP is the signature of friendship and brotherhood between Turkey and Azerbaijan to Anatolia.

In spring 2012, the process of conducting the technical-economic feasibility study was launched. On 26 June 2012, President of Azerbaijan Ilham Aliyev and then Prime Minister of Turkey Recep Tayyip Erdoğan signed a binding intergovernmental agreement on the pipeline. Also, the agreement was signed by Azerbaijani Industry and Energy Minister Natig Aliyev and Turkish Minister of Energy and Natural Resources Taner Yıldız. The initial agreement on organizational issues between BOTAŞ and SOCAR was signed by Natig Aliyev and Taner Yildiz, SOCAR President Rovnag Abdullayev and BOTAŞ Deputy Director General Mehmet Konuk. The host country agreement was signed by Yildiz and Abdullayev. On March 17, 2015, both Erdoğan and Aliyev met with Giorgi Margvelashvili, President of Georgia, in the city of Kars in Eastern Turkey to formally lay the foundations for the pipeline and marking the work as started.

On 12 June 2018, the TANAP was inaugurated at the compressor-measuring station in Eskişehir. The ceremony was attended by the Turkish president Erdoğan, the Azerbaijani president Aliyev, the Ukrainian president Petro Poroshenko, the Serbian president Aleksandar Vučić, and the Bulgarian prime minister Boyko Borisov, as also by the head of SOCAR Abdullayev, Turkish minister of energy and natural resources Berat Albayrak, and the chief executive officer of BP Bob Dudley.

On November 21, 2018, TANAP and the Trans-Adriatic Pipeline (TAP) were joined along the shores of the Maritsa River at the Turkish-Greek border. As a result of the joining of these two pipelines, Azerbaijani natural gas from the Shah Deniz-2 field is now transported to Italy via Azerbaijan, Georgia, Turkey, Greece, Albania, and the Adriatic Sea.

In 2022 the flow rate doubled from 6 to 12 bcma.

As of 2024 TANAP pipeline has a capacity of 16.2 bcm annually, supplying 5.7 bcm to Turkey and the remaining volume to Europe. According to SOCAR, over 62 bcm of gas has been transported through TANAP as of May 1, 2024.

== Description ==
The pipeline cost US$8.5 billion. $800 million of funding was approved by the International Bank for Reconstruction and Development.

The capacity of the pipeline is 16 billion cubic metres (570 billion cubic feet) of natural gas per year at initial stage and would be increased later up to 23 billion cubic metres (810 billion cubic feet) by 2023, 31 billion cubic metres (1.1 trillion cubic feet) by 2026, and at the final stage 60 billion cubic metres (2.1 trillion cubic feet) to be able to transport additional gas supplies from Azerbaijan and, if the Trans-Caspian Gas Pipeline was built, from Turkmenistan. Its capacity would be increased by adding parallel loops and compressor stations according to the increase of available supplies. The pipeline will consist of 56-inch (1,400 mm) pipes until Eskişehir, and 48-inch (1,200 mm) pipes thereafter and 36-inch (910 mm) across Marmora sea. The maximum height of the pipeline is 2,700 metres above mean sea level.

== Route ==
The TANAP pipeline passes through 20 provinces of Turkey – Ardahan, Kars, Erzurum, Erzincan, Bayburt, Gümüşhane, Giresun, Sivas, Yozgat, Kırşehir, Kırıkkale, Ankara, Eskişehir, Bilecik, Kütahya, Bursa, Balıkesir, Çanakkale, Tekirdağ and Edirne. The pipeline starts from Sangachal terminal and in territory of Azerbaijan is the expansion of South Caucasus Pipeline (SCPx). From end point of SCPx which is in Erzurum it continues to Eskişehir where it unloads 6bcm of gas entitled to Turkish buyers. From Turkey-Greece border continues through Greece, Albania and ends in Italy. The exact route of the pipeline is not clear. However, it was announced that one branch from Turkey would go to Greece and the other to Bulgaria. It would be connected with Trans Adriatic Pipeline. The Turkish government said in March 2015 that a branch from Greece through North Macedonia and Serbia to Hungary was also under consideration.

== Shareholders ==
The TANAP is operated by SOCAR. SGC holds 58% stake in the project. Turkey's pipeline operator BOTAŞ own 30%, while BP acquired 12% in the project on March 13, 2015. TANAP is headquartered in Ankara, Turkey.

Initially, Azerbaijan had held an 80% stake, with Turkey owning the remainder. The Turkish stake was divided between the Turkish upstream company TPAO (15%) and the Turkish pipeline operator BOTAŞ (5%). The international companies from the Shah Deniz consortium (BP, Statoil and Total) had an option to take up to 29% in TANAP. However, only BP exercised this option in December 2013. The Turkish government decided then that only BOTAŞ will hold a stake (20%) in TANAP. The Turkish pipeline operator acquired an additional 10% in May 2014. SOCAR's initial plan was to retain 51% and operatorship of the project. Several private Turkish companies had been interested in the remaining 7%, but this did not materialize.

CEO of TANAP is Saltuk Düzyol, the former general manager of BOTAŞ.

== Contractors ==
- Bechtel - Front End Engineering Design (FEED)
- WorleyParsons - Engineering, Procurement, Construction Management (EPCM)
- ABB - SCADA/Telecommunications System Engineering, Procurement and Construction (EPC) Works
- Yüksel inşaat - Construction, installation, personnel training, and testing
- Fernas Construction Company
- Vegas Prime Energy Group
- Akkord Industry Construction Investment Corporation
- Tekfen
- SICIM - SICIM is a Construction Company established in 1962 and offering all types of services related to the installation of pipelines and relevant ancillary facilities for the transmission and distribution of oil, gas and water on an international basis
- Punj Lloyd
- Limak Holding
- Sapura Energy
- Noksel Steel Pipe Co.

== Subcontractors ==
- Rouge Pipeline and Process Services LLC - Based in Dubai, ROUGE Pipeline & Process Services is broadly divided into 3 divisions – Pipeline Services, Process Services and Talent Solutions. With its strategic alliances and representative offices in GCC countries (KSA, Oman, Kuwait), Algeria, Russia, Azerbaijan, Turkey and India, ROUGE is a market leader providing specialist services to both Onshore & Offshore companies in the Oil & Gas Industry.

== See also ==
- TAP
- Nabucco pipeline
- South Caucasus Pipeline
- Baku–Tbilisi–Ceyhan pipeline
- Energy in Georgia (country)
