= Shah Deniz gas field =

Azerbaijani natural gas field

Shah Deniz
- Location within Caspian Sea
- Country: Azerbaijan
- Offshore/onshore: Offshore
- Coordinates: 39°58′N 50°13′E
- Operator: BP
- Partners: BP (29.99%); Lukoil (19.99%); TPAO (19.00%); SOCAR (14.35%); NICO (10.00%); SGC Upstream (6.67%)

Field history
- Discovery: 1999
- Start of production: 2006

Production
- Current production of gas: 7×10^{9} m^{3}/a (250×10^{9} cu ft/a)
- Estimated oil in place: 3,000 million barrels (~4.1×10^{8} t)
- Estimated gas in place: 1,200×10^{9} m^{3} (42×10^{12} cu ft)

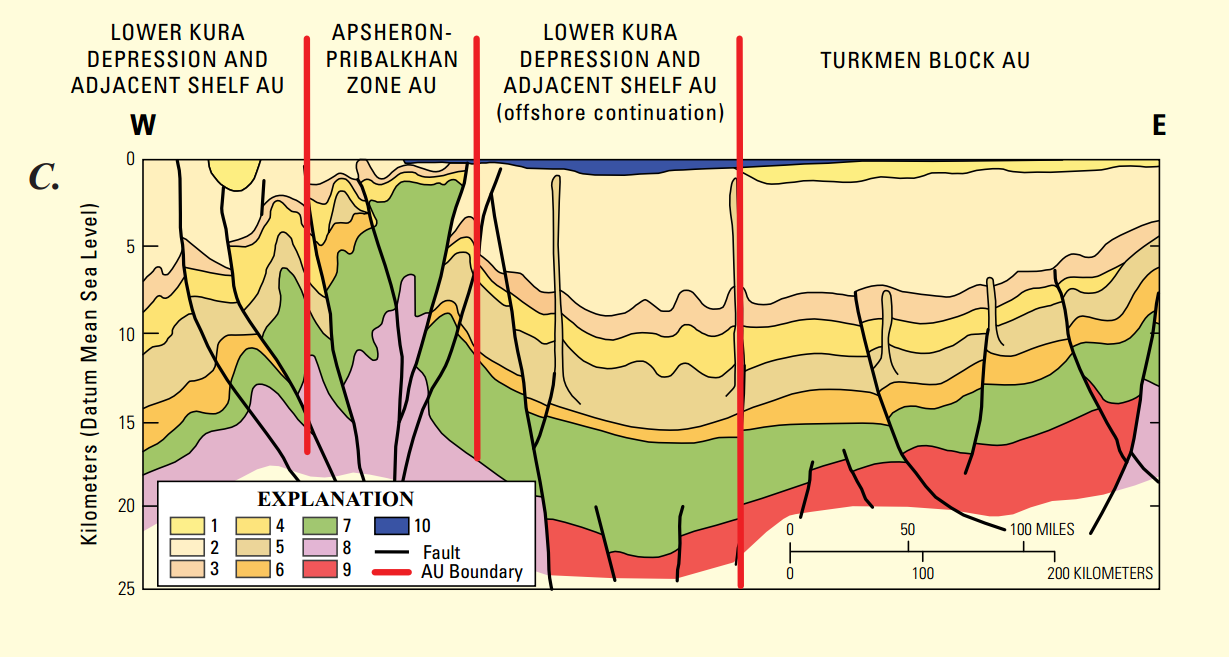
Absheron geologic cross section

Shah Deniz gas field (Azerbaijani: Şahdəniz) is the largest natural gas field in Azerbaijan. It is situated in the South Caspian Sea, off the coast of Azerbaijan, approximately 70 kilometres (43 mi) southeast of Baku, at a depth of 600 metres (2,000 ft). The field covers approximately 860 square kilometres (330 sq mi). Stretching out over 140 square kilometres, the reservoir is similar in size and shape to Manhattan Island.

It is considered to be a founding link for the Southern Gas Corridor, aiming to bring additional and alternative natural gas volumes to EU member countries.

== History ==
The “Exploration, Development, and Production Sharing Agreement" (PSA) for Shah Deniz area was signed between SOCAR and some oil companies of foreign countries on June 4, 1996. The Azerbaijani Parliament confirmed the PSA document on October 4, 1996. The Shah Deniz gas and condensate field was discovered in 1999. “An Intergovernmental” Agreement and a “Sale and Purchase” Agreement were signed by delegates of Azerbaijan and Turkey with the participation of President Sezer and President Heyder Aliyev in Ankara on March 12, 2001. "An Intergovernmental" Agreement and relevant agreements for the carrying and selling of natural gas were signed by delegates of Azerbaijan and Georgia with the participation of President Shevardnadze and President Aliyev on September 29, 2001. Some contracts for the construction of the first stage of Shah Deniz were concluded on June 5, 2003, and construction work for Shah Deniz began at Sangachal Terminal on November 3 of the same year. Construction works for South Caucasus Pipeline started in Azerbaijan on October 14, 2004.

== Shareholders ==
The Shah Deniz field is operated by BP which has a share of 29.99%. Other partners include LUKoil (19.99%), TPAO (19.00%), SOCAR (14.35%), NIOC (10.00%) and Southern Gas Corridor Upstream (6.67%).

Eni sold its 5% share to LUKOIL in June 2004. Later divestitures included pre-FID (Final Investment Decision) in December 2013 sales of 10% of the shares by Statoil, to BP and SOCAR, who shared them at 3.3% and 6.7% respectively. as well as sale by Total SA in May 2014 its 10% share to Turkish TPAO

In October 2014, Statoil sold its remaining 15.5% stake in the project to Petronas for a fee of $2.25 billion.

== Reserves ==
The Shah Deniz reserves are estimated at between 1.5 to 3 billion barrels (240 to 480 million cubic metres) of oil equivalent from 50 to 100 billion cubic meters of gas. Gas production to date at the end of 2005 was estimated to be approximately 7 billion cubic meters or an average of 17 million m^{3} (600 million ft^{3}) per day. The Shah Deniz field also contains gas condensate in excess of 400 million cubic meters.

== Pipeline ==
The 692 kilometres (430 mi) South Caucasus Pipeline, which began operation at the end of 2006, transports gas from the Shah Deniz field in the Azerbaijan sector of the Caspian Sea to Turkey, through Georgia.

The associated condensate is mixed with the oil from the ACG field and is transported to Turkey through Georgia, along the Baku–Tbilisi–Ceyhan pipeline.

== Recent developments ==
The Shah Deniz scheme started to produce gas at the end of December 2006, three months later than expected, and was forced to close briefly in January 2007. Azerbaijan announced that the field had resumed output only to admit that it had been shut down once more, for a few weeks, due to technical issues. The shutdown forced Georgia to buy emergency gas supplies from Russia at a market price. Georgia hopes that production from Shah Deniz will allow the country to decrease its energy—and political—dependence on Russia.

By July 2007, the Shah Deniz gas plant at Sangachal Terminal was fully operational, with all buyers of Shah Deniz taking gas.

== Phase 2 ==
Shah Deniz-2 discussions started in 2008 with the main topic being the selection of transportation routes for additional gas volumes. Five-year-long, intense negotiations were finalized with the signing of the Final Investment Decision (FID) on 17 December 2013 in Baku, Azerbaijan.

Key discussions concentrated on the selection of a pipeline to deliver the additional gas from the field to the European markets. It took years of negotiations to narrow down almost a dozen proposals to the final competing projects, TAP and Nabucco.

Nine companies agreed to sign a gas sales agreement (GSA) with the consortium:

- Axpo Trading AG
- Bulgargaz EAD
- DEPA Public Gas Corporation of Greece S.A.
- Enel Trade SpA
- E.ON Global Commodities SE
- Gas Natural Aprovisionamientos SDG SA
- GDF SUEZ S.A.
- Hera Trading srl
- Shell Energy Europe Limited

Out of a total of 10 bcm intended for Europe, 1 bcm will go to Bulgaria and Greece, and the rest will go to buyers in other countries, mainly Italy.

The project will include two additional bridge-linked offshore gas platforms, undersea wells, and an expansion of the gas plant at Sangachal Terminal, at an estimated cost of at least $10 billion.

The overall cost of Phase 2 expansion, including upstream and midstream stages (TANAP and TAP pipelines) is estimated to be around $45 billion.

In December 2016, the Asian Development Bank approved a total of $1 billion in both public and private assistance to support the expansion of the Shah Deniz 2 field. The assistance was made up of a $500 million private-sector loan to the Southern Gas Corridor Closed Joint Stock Company and a $500 million sovereign counter-guaranteed partial credit guarantee. This guarantee will back over $500 million in commercial loans from a consortium of banks to SCG.

According to the 2017 year-end results, Azerbaijani Government has paid out more than $456 million in operational costs and approximately $1.176 billion in capital costs on the project of Azeri Chiraq Guneshli in 2017.

An Agreement (which is amended and restated), was signed between the Azerbaijani government and some international companies and SOCAR for working together on the project of Azeri Chirag Guneshli and production sharing on September 14, 2017, and this contract was confirmed by National Assembly of Azerbaijan on October 31.

Total production of Azeri Chirag Guneshli was approximately 588,000 barrels per day including 51,000 b/d from platforms of Chirag, 137,000 b/d from platforms of Central Azeri, 124,000 b/d from platforms of West Azeri, 82,000 b/d from platforms of East Azeri, 117,000 b/d from platforms of Deepwater Gunashli, 77,000 b/d from platforms of West Chirag during a year (2017).

As of May 2026, the production capacity of the field amounts to approximately 74.2 million cubic meters per day (27.1 billion cubic meters per year).

In October 2026, BP commenced offshore construction work as part of the $2.9 billion "Shah Deniz Compression" project at the "Shah Deniz" gas condensate field.

== See also ==
- Petroleum industry in Azerbaijan
- South Caucasus Pipeline
- Shafag-Asiman
- TANAP
- TAP
- Azeri-Chirag-Guneshli
- Baku-Tbilisi-Ceyhan pipeline
