= Stepan Lianozov =

Russian writer and lawyer (1872–1949)

- Born: Stepan Lianozov; 9 August 1872; Moscow, Russian Empire
- Died: 10 August 1951 (aged 79); Paris, France
- Resting place: Passy Cemetery, Paris
- Occupation: Oil Magnate
- Children: Nikolai
- Parent: Gevorg

Stepan Georgievich Lianozov (Armenian: Ստեփան Գևորգի Լիանոսյան; 9 August 1872 - 10 August 1951) was a Russian industrialist of Armenian descent who contributed to petroleum industry in Azerbaijan. Lianozov founded "G.M. Lianozov Sons" in Moscow with 2 million rubles as founding capital. Stepan Lianozov's impact on the oil industry in Baku was considerable and became known as the "Russian Rockefeller". Having served in over twenty companies prior to the Russian Revolution, he attracted and managed numerous investments in the Baku oil industry, which started a revolution in world oil production and brought his company OIL as the top petroleum company in Baku and third largest oil producer in the world. Lianozov also became a political activist most notably during the Russian Civil War. He also was a financier of the film industry in Russia and had become a film producer himself.

== Early life ==
Stepan Georgievich Lianozov was born in Moscow on 9 August 1872. Lianozov's father, Gevorg Lianozov (1835–1906), came from an Armenian family that was deported from Eastern Armenia by the Persian Shah Abbas the Great in 1604. Gevorg Lianozov along with his brother Stepan were well-known figures in the production of caviar from the Caspian Sea, and would ultimately inherit the oil business that his father's brother Stepan had been engaged in since 1872.

After Stepan Lianozov, Gevorg's son, graduated from high school, he entered the school of Natural Sciences of the University of Moscow. Four years thereafter, Lianozov changed his career to law graduating in 1898 from the Faculty of Law at Moscow State University and becoming an assistant to a magistrate in the court chamber of Moscow. In 1901, Stepan gave up his rights to the caviar business that he inherited from his father and allowed his two brothers, Martin and Levon to take control of that industry. Stepan then fully dedicated himself to the lucrative oil business.

== Oil industry ==
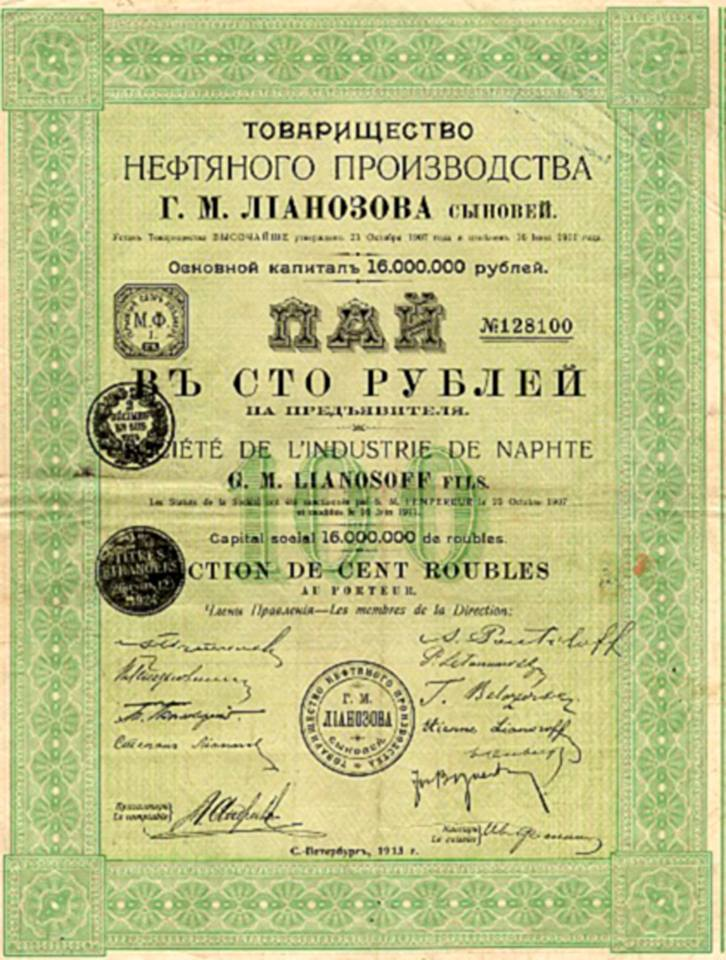
A share of G.M.Lianozov and Sons company based in Baku before 1917

With the death of his father, Stepan Lianozov founded the G.M. Lianozov Sons oil company in 1907 with 2 million rubles as founding capital. Lianozov's impact on the oil industry in Baku was considerable. He attracted and managed numerous investments in the Baku oil industry, which started a revolution in world oil production and brought his company OIL as the top petroleum company in Baku and third largest oil producer in the world. In 1912 Stepan Lianozov and Levon Mantashov (Son of Alexander Mantashev), sold most of their stock to Petersburg banks which ultimately led to the foundation of a new corporation, Russian General Oil Corporation or OIL in July 28 of that year in which 2,500,000 million pounds were used as founding capital in London. OIL eventually bought a number of oil production companies in Baku, such as "Mirzoev brothers and Co.", "A.S. Melikov and Co", "Shikhovo" (A. Tsaturyan, G. Tsovianyan, K. and D. Bikhovsky, L. Leytes), "I.E. Pitoev and Co", "Krasilnikov Brothers", "Aramazd" and others. The G.M. Lianozov trading enterprise eventually became one of the largest oil industry firms in Russia. The chairmanship included Russian prominent businessman P. Lejdnovsky and A. Putilov, and the chairman was Stepan Lianozov. The company also had subsidiaries that produced kerosene and refined petroleum, a pipeline along the shores of the Caspian Sea, and others. With the growing success of the company, Lianozov was elected member of the Baku City Council and the Baku Stock Exchange council.

== Investments in the film industry ==
Lianozov diversified some of his investment into the new Russian film industry. In the spring of 1914, Lianozov and the Mantashov brothers invested heavily in a new film company founded by photographer and chemist Sergey Prokudin-Gorsky called Biochrome. The company had its headquarters in one of Lianozov's properties in Moscow. This building would eventually become the State Committee for Cinematography during the Soviet era. The company filmed several movies including “No Exit,” “The God of Revenge,” “The Eternal Tale of Life.” However, in 1918, the filming ended abruptly due to a fire that burnt the movie sets.

== Political activism ==
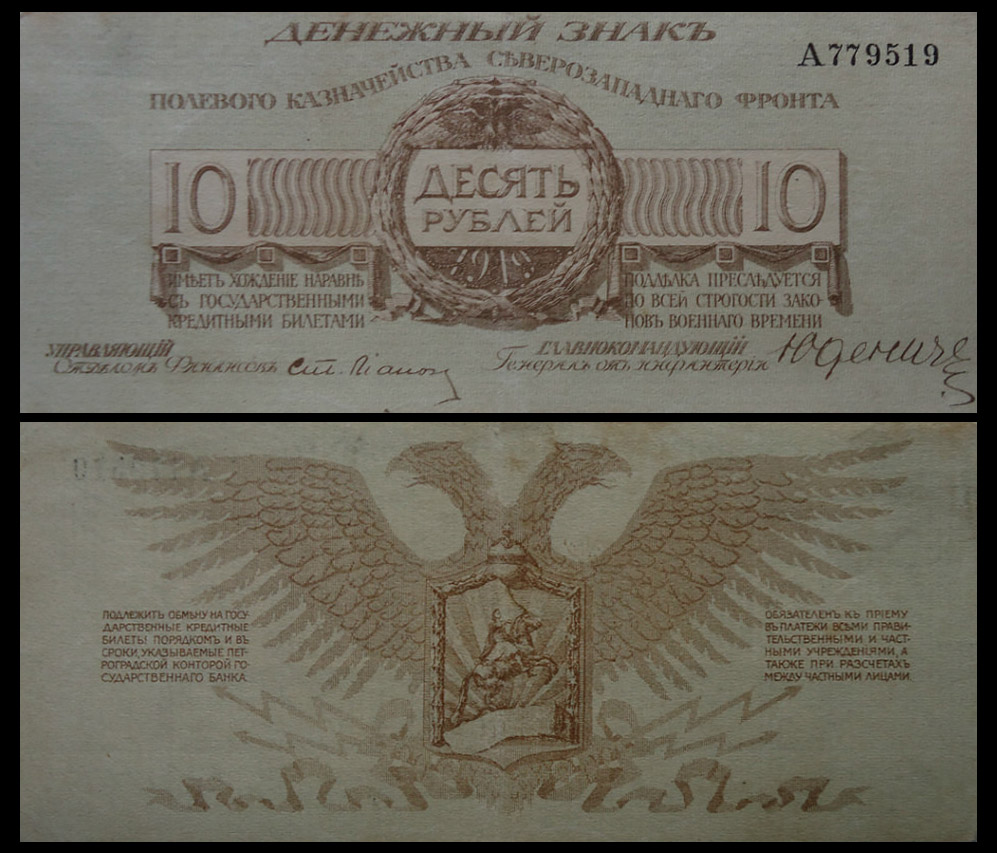
Banknotes of Yudenich government printed in August 1919 which features the signature of Lianozov on the bottom center-right

After World War I, with the continued success of his businesses, Lianozov became an activist in the political world as he entered politics and participated in the civil war that ensued. While in Finland, Lianozov brought together members of the White Army in a meeting in May 1919. In this meeting, the White Army wanted to create a republic called the Regional Government of Northwest Russia, a self-proclaimed republic located in today's Estonia. Lianozov took positions in the ministry and was also designated the head of the government. Other participants of the formation of the republic included General Nikolai Yudenich, Alexander Vasilyevich Kolchak, and Anton Denikin who took became ministers of war and took positions as generals in the newly formed army. Lianozov's first move in the political arena was to recognize the independence of Estonia on 11 August 1919 and then Latvia on the 3rd of September and Finland on the 23rd of the same year. He also issued currency in the form of rubles in which Yudenich had signed. Yudenich then spearheaded an offensive upon St. Petersburg which ultimately sparked the dissolution of the Northwest Republic and prompted Lianozov to flee to Paris.

== Life in Paris ==
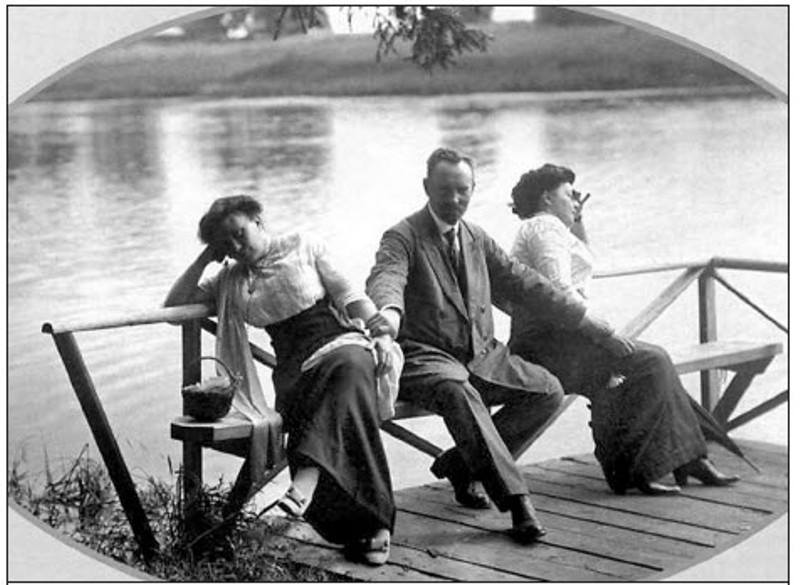
Stepan Lianozov with family members

In 1920, in his first year in Paris, Lianozov was among the founding members of TorgProm (Russian Trade-Industrial and Financial Union) an interest group whose purpose was to protect the interests of Russian businessmen in France and work against the Bolsheviks. In 1925, Lianozov worked as a film producer, which became his main source of income for several years. Thereafter, in 1926, he was the representative for France of the Russian Congress Abroad. While in Paris, in August 1922, Lianozov became the chairman of a consortium of Americans, French, and Japanese investors and would finance the exploration of oil in the Sakhalin islands which was then under Japanese control (today Russia).

Stepan Lianozov died on 10 August 1951 in Paris and was buried in the Passy Cemetery. He had one son named Nikolai.
