= Petroleum industry in Azerbaijan =

Aspect of Azerbaijani industry

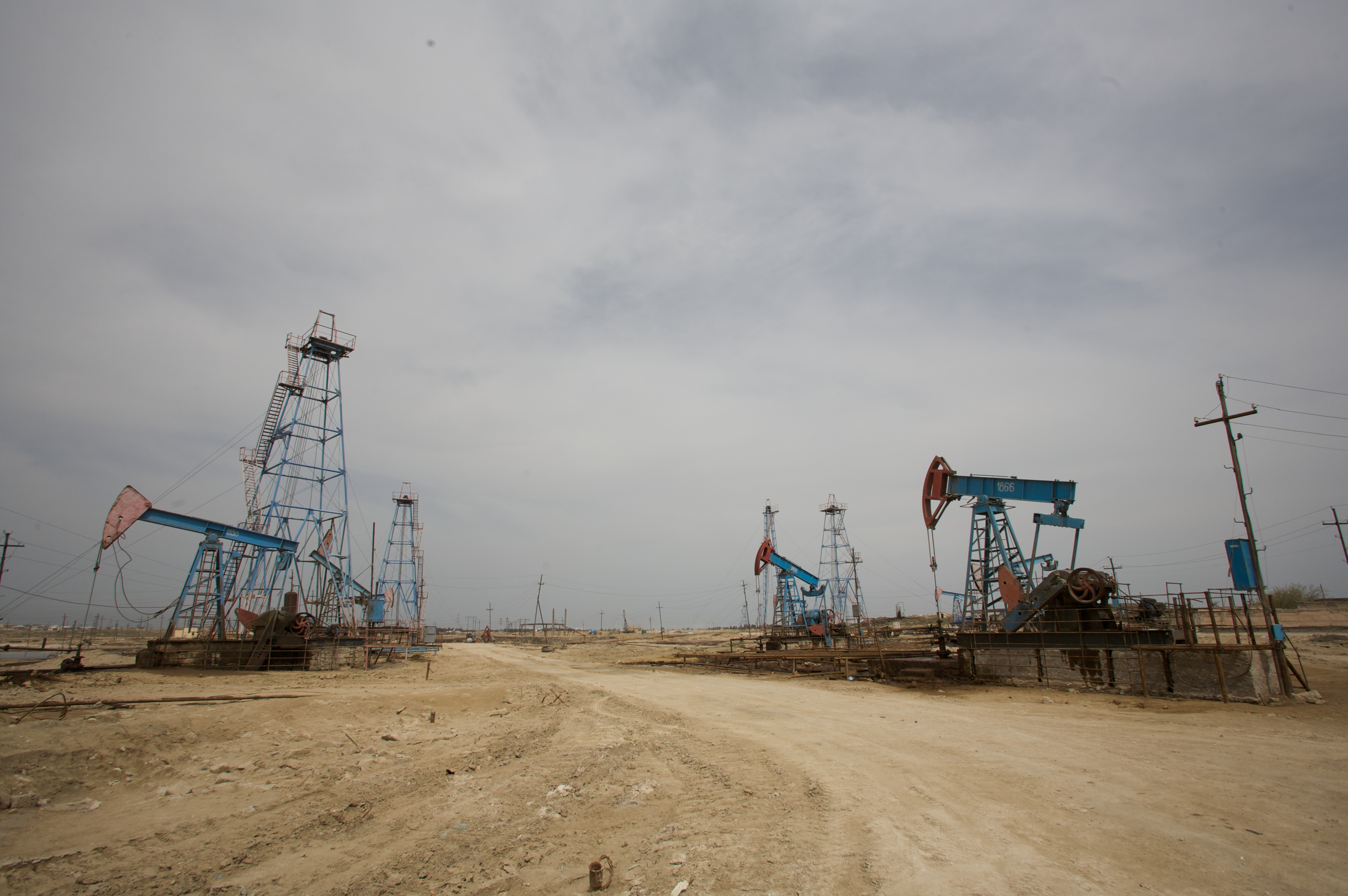
Onshore oil fields in Azerbaijan

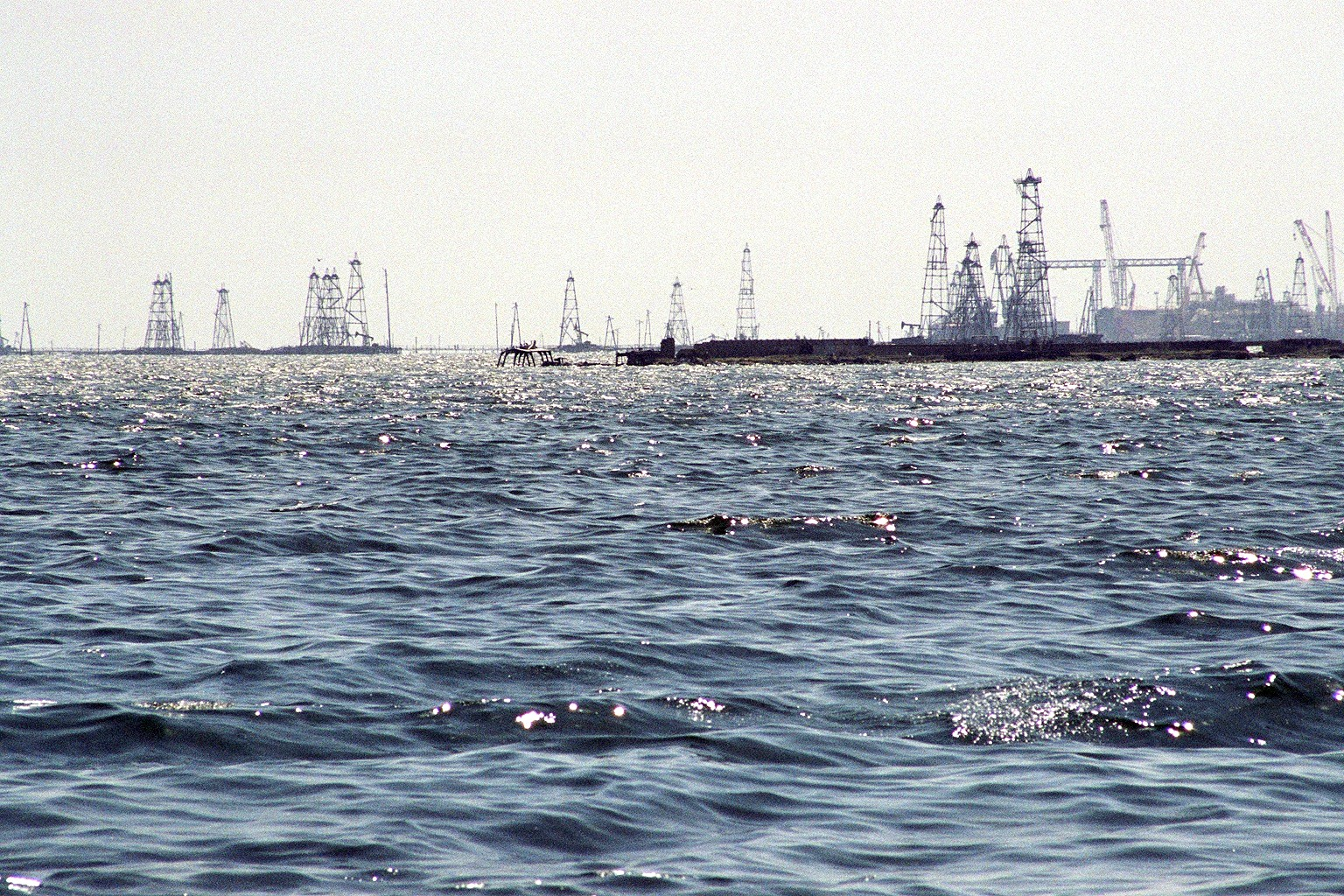
Offshore oil fields in Azerbaijan

The petroleum industry in Azerbaijan produced about 33 million tonnes of oil and 35 billion cubic meters of gas in 2022. Azerbaijan is one of the birthplaces of the oil industry.

The State Oil Company of the Republic of Azerbaijan (SOCAR), a fully state-owned national oil and gas company headquartered in Baku, is a major source of income for the Azerbaijani government. The company is run opaquely through complex webs of contracts and middlemen, which non-government watchdog organizations and others say have channeled revenues to the country's ruling elites.

== Early history ==
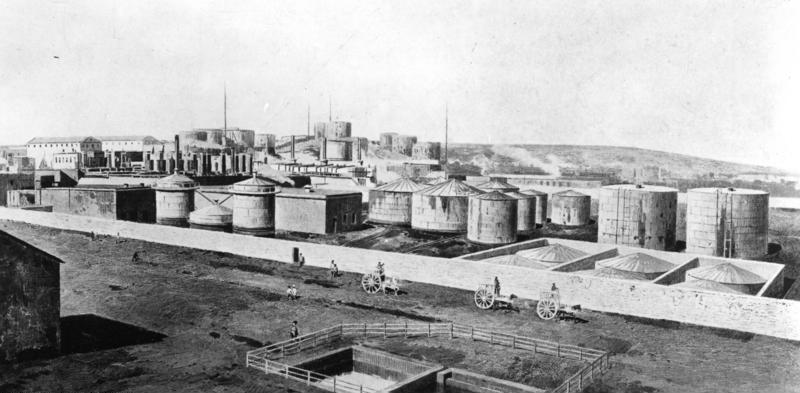
Oil refinery in Baku, circa 1912

There is evidence of petroleum being used in trade as early as the 3rd and 4th centuries. Information on the production of oil on the Apsheron peninsula can be found in the manuscripts of many Arabic and Persian authors.

The following paragraph from the accounts of the famous traveler Marco Polo "il Milione" is believed to be a reference to Baku oil:

"Near the Georgian border there is a spring from which gushes a stream of oil, in such abundance that a hundred ships may load there at once. This oil is not good to eat; but it is good for burning and as a salve for men and camels affected with itch or scab. Men come from a long distance to fetch this oil, and in all the neighborhood no other oil is burnt but this."

A 1593 inscription in Balaxani commemorates a manually dug well, 35 m deep.

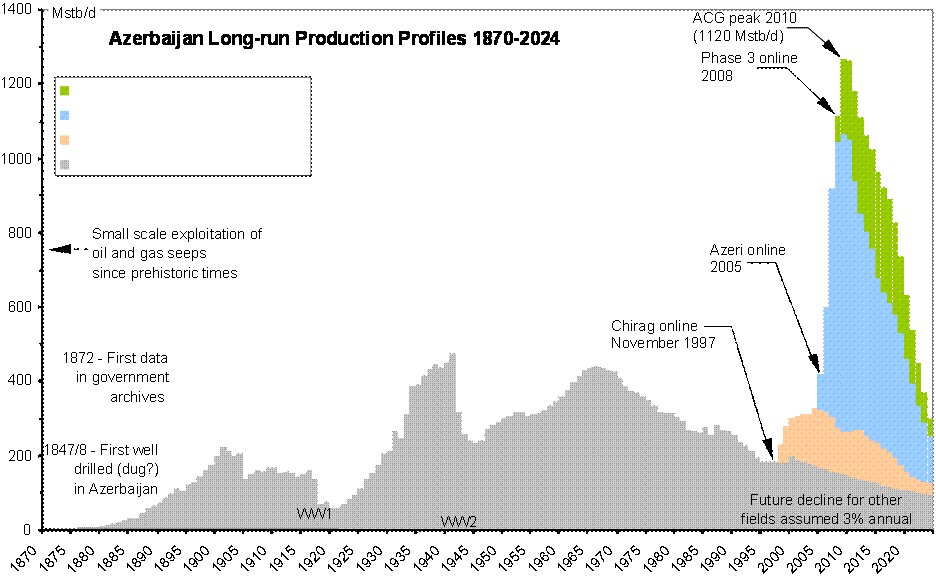
Historical oil production

The Turkish scientist and traveller Evliya Çelebi (1611–1683) reported that "the Baku fortress was surrounded by 500 wells, from which white and black acid refined oil was produced".

In 1636 German diplomat and traveller Adam Olearius (1603–1671, "Ölschläger", often transcribed as "Adam Oleary Elshleger") gave a description of 30 Baku oil wells and remarked that some of them were gushers.

The first detailed description of the Baku oil industry was made by Engelbert Kaempfer, Secretary of the Swedish Embassy to Persia (Iran) in 1683. In his notes he confirms the existence of places where natural gas discharges to the surface. Kaempfer describes "flaming steppe" as follows: it "...constitutes a peculiar and wonderful sight, for some of the fissures were blazing with big, others with quite flame and was allowing everybody to come up; thirds emitted smoke or at any case minimum perceptible evaporation that was sending off heavy and stinking taste of oil. It was occupying the territory of 88 steps in length and 26 in width." (improved translation needed)

Many 18th and 19th century European accounts of the Caucasus refer to the Fire Temple of Baku at Suraxanı raion, where the fire was fed by natural gas from a cavern beneath the site.

== Pre-revolution period ==
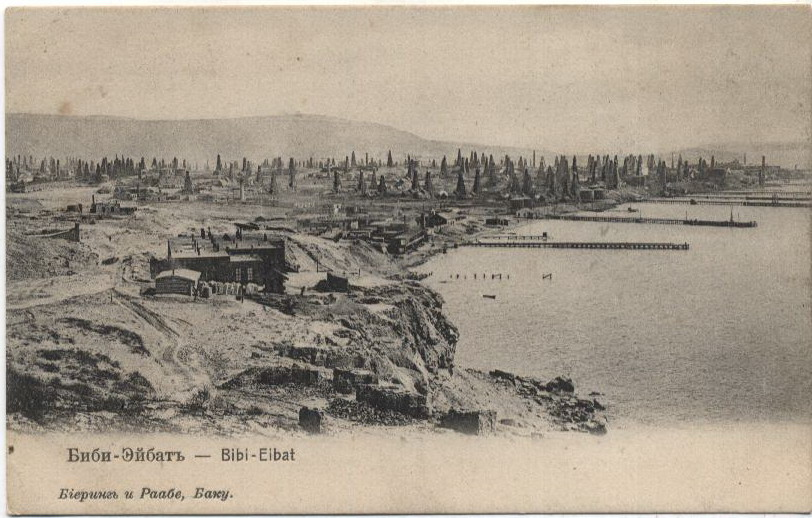
First oil fields in Bibiheybət in the outskirts of Baku

In 1803 Haji Kasimbey Mansurbekov, began the world's first undersea oil extraction from two wells in Bibi-Heybat bay, 18m and 30m from the coast, later destroyed by a strong storm in 1825. Oil extraction methods were primitive, mainly shallow hand-dug wells.

In 1806, the Russian Empire occupied Baku Khanate and appropriated its oil production as a state enterprise, about 120 wells producing some 200,000 poods of oil annually. Later, exclusive 3-4 year contracts to produce oil were awarded to individuals, creating the Persian otkupchina lease system.

In the first half of the 19th century, the cumbersome otkupschina monopoly and stagnant demand left annual oil production unchanged at 250–300 poods (4–5 thousand tons). In 1813, the number of producing wells was 116; then 125 in 1825; 120 in 1850; and 218 in 1860. In 1842 the Caspian Chamber of the Russian Ministry of State Property reported 136 wells around Absheron producing 3,760 cubic metres (23,600 bbl) per year, exported to Persia for lighting as well as ointments and traditional remedies. Otkupschina contractors had little incentive to increase oil production or improve drilling methods. Oil seepage was bailed from shallow hand-dug wells, transported by arbos (horse carriages carrying 2 barrels) to the shore of Baku bay, where kerosene was distilled in open stills, and finally transported via ship over the Caspian Sea and Volga River to Russian markets, especially St. Petersburg.

In 1837, the Russian engineer Nikolay Voskoboynikov (1801–1860) built an oil-distilling factory in Balaxani. In 1844, he proposed drilling for oil rather than digging by hand, supported by Vasily Semyonov (1801–1863) in a government report on the Baku region. In 1845, the Caucasus governor Grand Duke Mikhail Vorontsov (1782–1856) authorized funds for the drilling project. In 1846, the engineer Nikolay Matveyevich Alekseev used a percussion drill to dig a 21 m deep well, striking oil in Bibiheybət. It was not until 1859 that "Colonel" Edwin L. Drake struck oil on American soil for the first time. In the early days of drilling, most production came from oil gushers, a very uneconomical and environmentally harmful process, but as equipment improved the share of blowout production decreased. In 1887, blowouts accounted for 42% of recovered oil, but by 1890 this decreased to 10.5%.

A small petrochemical industry sprang up around Baku as demand for kerosene soared locally. Vasily Kokorev, Peter Gubonin and German baron N.E. Tornow built the first kerosene factory in Surakhany. The factory produced kerosene from "kir", an asphalt-like substance. In 1859, N.I. Vitte, a Tiflis pharmacist, built the second paraffin-producing factory, on Pirallahi Island.

In 1871, Ivan Mirzoev, an ethnic Armenian who was then an otkupchina monopolist, built the first wooden oil derrick followed by another the next year. The drilling mechanism used a balance arm, whim and manual pump.

In 1873, a new law replaced the otkupchina contract-monopoly with a long-term lease system, and removed the kerosene excise tax in 1877.

Robert Nobel arrived in Baku in March 1873, where he purchased an oil refinery, and in 1875, purchased a large portion of the Balakhani Oil Field, where he built a new refinery. Nobel Brothers Petroleum Production Company was founded in 1877, followed by Branobel in 1879. They added infrastructure, including Russia's first pipeline system in 1877, pumping stations, storage depots, railway tank cars, and the first oil tanker, the Zoroaster. In 1881, they introduced continuous multi-still distillation, and hired Hjalmar Sjögren as the company geologist in 1885. The Nobels built Villa Petrolea as a company town with apartments, houses, schools, and libraries, while employees were given profit-sharing and free education.

The Baku Petroleum Association was formed in 1884 for the interests of the local refining industry, aiming to prevent the exportation of crude oil. A large kerosene pipeline was constructed between 1897 and 1907 connecting Baku to Batum. The Baku oil production barons established their own organization, the Oil Extractors Congress Council, sponsoring the magazine Neftyanoe Delo (Oil Business), as well as a library, school, hospital, and pharmacy. For six years, the Council was directed by Ludvig Nobel.

The oil industry built Baku into a modern city. Administrative, social and municipal institutions were established to plan and erect the city's illumination, roads, streets, buildings, telephone stations, and horse-drawn trolleys. Gardens and parks were laid out, and hotels, casinos and luxury stores opened.

After the reform, rights to develop the oil fields were limited to Russian-registered businesses, but in 1898 foreign companies were admitted to the annual bidding on rights to explore and develop oil fields. Between 1898 and 1903, British oil firms invested 60 million rubles. Ethnic Armenians also entered, reportedly running almost a third of the region's oil industry by 1900.

=== Oil production ===
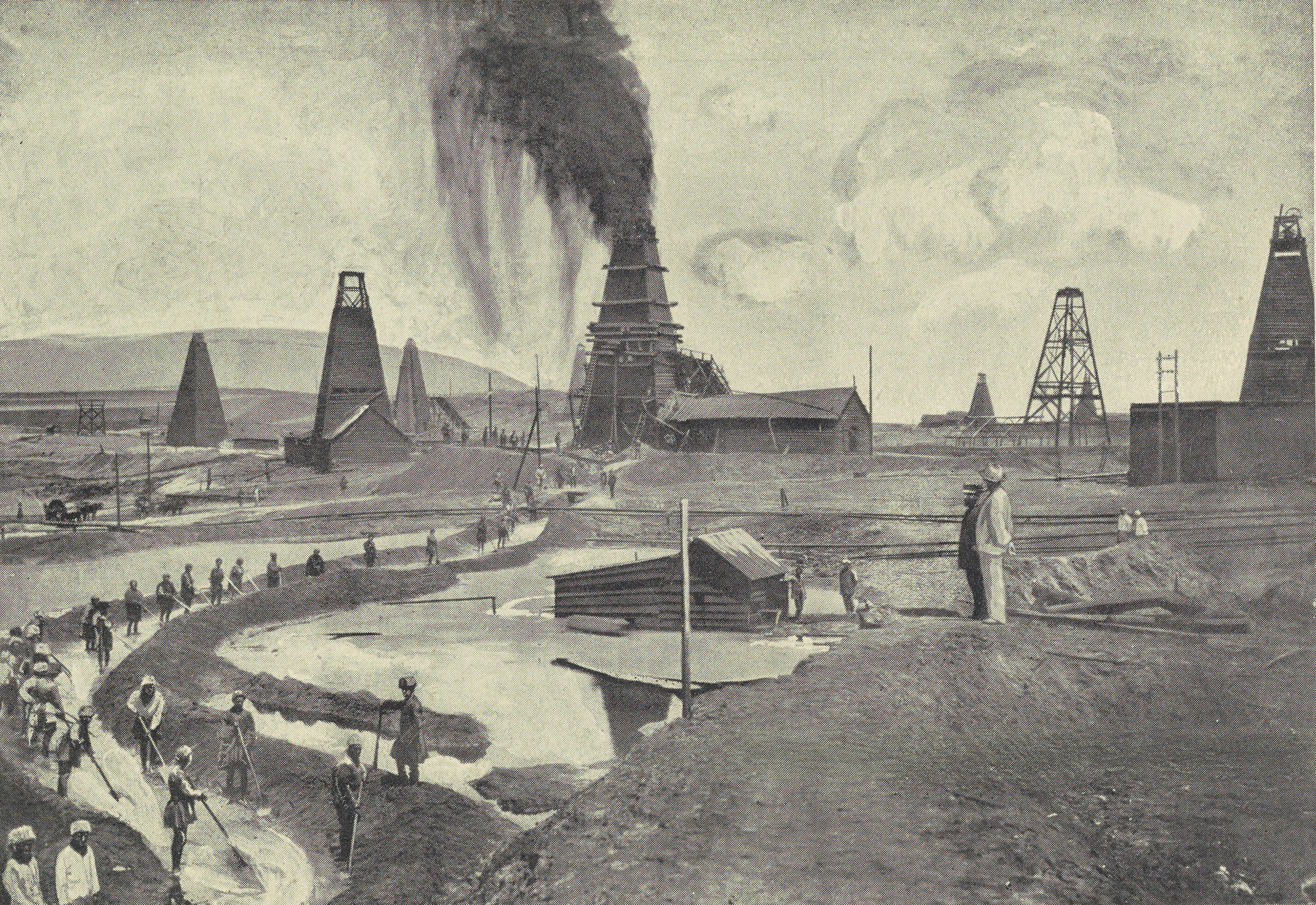
Oil wells in Baku, Azerbaijan, "Where it Rains Petroleum", ca. 1909

Between 1898 and 1901, Baku produced more oil than the United States. By 1901, half of the world's oil was produced from its 1900 wells located within 6 square miles,

In 1898, approximately 8 million tons of oil were produced, 160,000 barrels (25,000 m^{3}) per day. By 1901, Baku produced more than half of the world's oil, 11 million tons or 212,000 barrels (33,700 m^{3}) per day, making up 55% of all Russian oil, with 1.2 million tons of Baku kerosene also sold abroad.

The main oil-producing localities were Sabunchy, Surakhany and Bibi-Heybat. Until the beginning of the 20th century, the Sabunchi region produced 35% of Baku's oil, and the Bibi-Heybat region produced 28%, followed by the Romany and the Balakhany regions.

Foreign capital dominated the oil industry of pre-revolutionary Russia. On the eve of World War I three companies (Russian General Oil Company, Royal Dutch Shell, and Nobel Brothers) held 86% of equity capital and controlled 60% of oil production. In 1903, twelve English companies with capital of 60 million rubles were functioning in the Baku region. In 1912, Anglo-Dutch Shell obtained 80% of the shares of the Caspian-Black Sea Society "Mazut", which had belonged to De Rothschild Frères. Other British firms purchased oil operations from Hajji Zeynalabdin Taghiyev.

=== Local oil barons and foreign oil companies ===
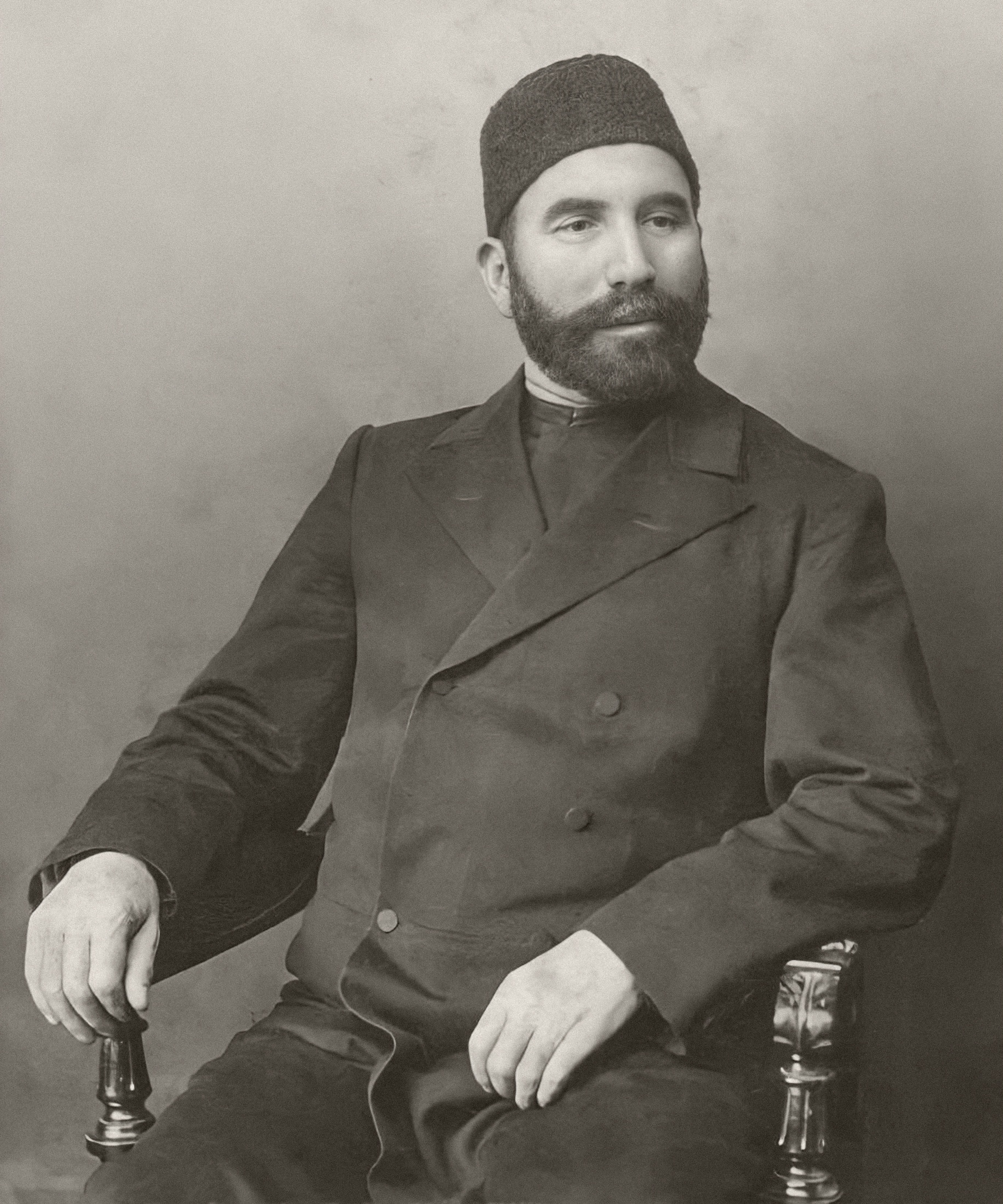
Zeynalabdin Taghiyev

- Branobel Operating Company – largest single oil producer in Azerbaijan at 25,000 bop/d in 1914. Largest refiner and transporter of oil, as well as retailer of kerosene in Europe. Markets of France, Turkey, Greece and Germany were fully supplied by Nobel-produced kerosene and other products.
- De Rothschild Frères – trading and shipping in association with Shell. Possessed second largest tanker fleet in the Caspian, after Nobels.
- Alexander Mantashev – a Russian-Armenian oil tycoon, the owner of the third-largest oil company in Baku, A.I. Mantashev & Co., by 1904.
- Calouste Gulbenkian – a British-Armenian oil tycoon, nicknamed "Mr Five Per Cent". He arranged the merger of Royal Dutch Petroleum Company with "Shell" Transport and Trading Company Ltd. and emerged as a major shareholder of the newly formed company, Royal Dutch Shell.
- Royal Dutch Shell – Acted through associated companies: Caspian Black Sea Society Caucasus, S.M. Shibayev and Co. The Shell-led consortium produced a fifth of Russian output up to 1914, 15,000 boppd in 1914.
- Zeynalabdin Taghiyev – oil, textiles and fishing. His firm produced 1,900 bbl/d (300 m^{3}/d) in 1887 and occupied 4th place in the refining business.
- Aga Musa Nagiyev – oil and real estate. The second-largest Azerbaijani oil producer and largest native producer.
- Murtuza Mukhtarov – oil drilling services.
- Shamsi Asadullayev – oil shipping, largest native industrialist.
- James Vishau and Anglo-Russian Oil Company
- Trade House Benkendorf and Co – oil production.
- The Russian Oil General Corporation – established in London in 1912 by the most important Russian and foreign banks, united 20 companies. These included A.I. Mantashev & Co., G.M. Lianozov Sons, Adamov and sons, Moscow-Caucasus Trade Company, Caspian Partnership, Russian Petroleum Society, Absheron Petroleum Society, and others. This agglomeration produced more than 30% of Russian oil by 1916.

Distribution of Russian oil producers in 1900–13

Smaller entrepreneurs also made contributions to the industrial development of Azerbaijan, such as Haji Baba Alekperov, Agasibek Ashurbeyov, Ali Bala Zarbaliyev, Kerbalay Zarbaliyev, Huseyin Melikov, G. Bagirov, G. Aliyev, S. Zminov, Amir-Aslanov brothers owned oil-field areas in Sabunchi, Balakhani, Romani, Shubani, Bibi-Heybat.

=== Subsurface and drilling ===
By the late 1890s, large companies started to employ geologists to describe and map prospective structures. Geologist and oil specialist Dmitry Golubyatnikov began a systematic investigation of Absheron and predicted the availability of oil deposits in Surakhany field. In 1901, the Pirallahi oil field was discovered and put on production. Scientists like Ivan Gubkin, Golubyatnikov and Uskin described the productive series deposits of Azerbaijan and the process generation for the first time in 1916.

By the early 20th century, innovation started to improve hitherto backward well drilling practices. Most of the wells up to that time were drilled by cable-tool drilling method, which limited the exploitation to shallow depth.

Qualified engineers (of which Fatulla Rustambeyov is the first Azeri national) contributed to the improvement of well designs. By early 1913, the following changes occurred in some of the largest producers, such as Branobel.

- Transition from percussion cable-tool drilling to rotary drilling using electrical drive.
- Use of thread line casing pipe instead of valve strings during drilling.
- Replacement of wooden derricks with metal ones.
- The process of gaslift was tested for the first time in 1915 in Romani field.
- The compression during transportation of oil and gas was introduced in 1911.

=== Storage and transportation ===
In 1858, one of the major shipping companies on the Caspian Sea – joint-stock company "Kavkaz and Merkuriy" was established and served as the first oil shipping outlet.

Great changes were introduced in the area of oil storage by Nobels. To counteract the waste of the ground pits, vessels and lakes where great quantities of oil evaporated or simply penetrated back into the ground, the company started to use iron reservoirs for oil storage.

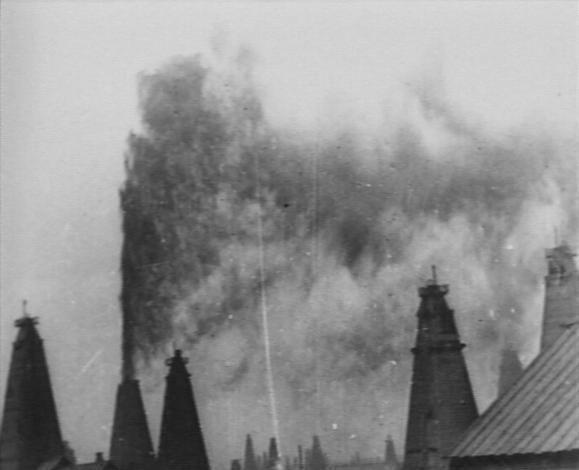
The Oil Gush in Balakhany, one of the earliest films ever produced, directed by the pioneer of cinema in Azerbaijan, Alexander Mishon

The first successful oil tanker in the world – a refurbished metal ship called Zoroastr – was built in 1877 in Sweden by Nobels. By 1890 345 tankers, including 133 steam vessels and 212 sailing vessels, were sailing on the Caspian Sea. For instance, Mazut Trading Co, created by Rothschild Frères in 1898, possessed 13 tankers in the Caspian Sea alone. During these years, native Azerbaijani shipowners appeared, of which the largest fleet belonged to Shamsi Asadullayev.

In 1877, construction of the first-ever oil pipeline linking Surakhany oil field and the refinery in Baku was completed. By 1890, there were more than 25 pipelines totaling 286 km.

The Nobel Brothers were the first to introduce railway tanks (cisterns) for oil transportation, when the railway link between Baku and Tiflis was built in 1883. The situation with limited exporting options was solved by the construction of the Baku–Batum pipeline. After 1936 Batum renamed to Batumi. Construction began in 1897 and was completed 10 years later under the supervision of Professor N. L. Szhukin.

== Revolution and Soviet Republic ==
Several oil crises jolted Russia around 1903, when constant strikes, violence and ethnic strife during Russian Revolution of 1905 led to fall in the oil production from the peak of 212,000 bbl/d (33,700 m^{3}/d). The relative calm of the early 1910s was disrupted by World War I, when production of oil steadily decreased to reach the lowest level of just 65,000 bbl/d (10,300 m^{3}/d) by 1918 and then dropped even more catastrophically by 1920. As a result of civil unrest, no oil export was possible, oil storage facilities were damaged and wells were idle. The government of Democratic Republic of Azerbaijan was unable to restore the damage done to the oil industry during its time in office between 1918 and 1920.

Since 1918, more 5 mln ton of oil accumulated in Azerbaijan. After the occupation of Azerbaijan by Bolsheviks, all oil supplies were directed to Russia. All oil assets in the country were nationalized and Azneft State company was formed. In 1920, Alexander P. Serebrovsky, soon to be known as the "Soviet Rockefeller", was named head of Azneft.

In 1920, only 1800 qualified specialists worked in the Russian oil industry of which 1232 worked in Azerbaijan. The industry urgently needed technology, education and specialists. The scientific exchange started with the US, where visitors from Baku were seconded to oil-fields in Pennsylvania, Oklahoma, California, Texas, learned new methods of well deepening and exploitation. The Azerbaijan State Oil Academy was established in 1920 to train oil specialists.

By the late 1920s, production stabilized. In 1928–29, oil production in the USSR equaled to 13.5 mln t including Azerbaijan's 8.7 mln t. By 1940, the total production of Azerbaijan – 23.5 mln. t (475,000 bbl/d (75,500 m^{3}/d)) – was a historical record not broken until 2005.

=== Advancement in drilling and logging practices ===
For the first time in Russia in 1925, Baku engineer M.M. Skvortsov constructed a device for the automatic movement of a chisel, which became known as the "automatic driller". By 1930, electrical logging tools were used in the wellbore by Schlumberger in the Surakhany oil field.

A new technology in drilling was introduced in Baku: electrical aggregates with exact control of the number of rotations came into widespread use. By the early 1930s, about a third of well stock was operated with pumps using gas lift. In 1933, the first deviated well was drilled in the Bibi-Heybat field.

Other firsts were:

- 1936 saw the beginning of the industrial application of the multi-stepped turbo drill without a reducer, which had been invented by Shumilov, Taghiyev and others.
- For the first time in the world, an oil well was drilled by the electro-drilling construction which was introduced by engineers Ostrovsky, Aleksandrov and others in Kala oil field.

=== World War II ===
Between 1939 and 1940, when the Soviet Union was supplying oil to Nazi Germany, Britain and France planned a major strategic bombing offensive called Operation Pike to destroy the oil production facilities in Baku. In June 1941, Hitler invaded the Soviet Union, with the Baku oil fields as an eventual strategic target.

During that first year of fighting, Azerbaijan produced 25.4 million tons of oil for the Russian war effort – a record. A decree of the Supreme Soviet in February 1942 honored more than 500 workers and employees of the Azerbaijan oil industry with orders and medals of the USSR.

By the end of the year, so many oil workers had left for the war front that positions had to be filled by women. By summer 1942, more than 25,000 women, 33% of all the workers, were working 18-hour shifts in the oil industries. At refineries and chemical plants, the percentage of women was even higher, estimated at 38%. By 1944, women's participation had grown to 60%. Veterans and retirees also returned to oil field work. It was not uncommon for the small towns (i.e. Kıncıvo) to devote their entire workforce to the oil industry during this period.

Hitler was determined to capture the oil fields of the Caucasus to provide much-needed oil supplies for the German military, which was blockaded from overseas supply, and had to rely on oil from Romania plus domestic coal liquefaction. Success would also deny Caucasus oil to the Soviet military. The 1942 German offensive codenamed Case Blue aimed to seize the oil fields in a large-scale advance into the area, though diminished by a diversion of forces against Soviet supply lines along the river Volga. On July 23, 1942, Hitler signed Directive No. 45 ordering the strategic advance in the Caucasus, codenamed "Edelweiss". According to the Edelweiss plan, the main oil regions of the Caucasus (Baku, Maikop, Grozny oil field) were to be occupied, and the Wehrmacht was to be supplied with the fuel it desperately needed from these territories, provided by "Technische Brigade Mineralöl" experts. According to the Edelweiss plan, Baku was to be occupied by September 25, 1942. The German military command planned a sudden landing of troops in Baku so that the Soviet authorities could not destroy the oil fields. But the Axis forces were surrounded and eventually defeated at Stalingrad, forcing a retreat from the Caucasus region. Control of oil supply from Baku and the Middle East played a large role in the events of the war and the ultimate victory of the Allies.

== Post-war period ==
=== Beginning of offshore exploration ===
Oil production from the existing fields started to decline after World War II, as a result of catastrophic over-production and under-investment. However, real potential for new discoveries was felt to be present offshore.

As far back as 1864, a German mineralogist and geologist Otto von Abich surveyed and reported structures present on the seabed of the Caspian.

In the early 1930s, engineers proposed construction of offshore wells from timber piles, connected by a causeway. The first such well was laid in the open sea on the depth of 6 m to the east from filled Bibi-Heybet bay.

In 1945, oil engineers S.A. Orujev and Y. Safarov proposed a method of tubular collapsible constructions for offshore bases. This construction enabled quick installation under oil-rig at any season. In 1947, a group of oilmen developed the trestle method of linking development rigs and processing facilities. Average height of trestle above sea level is 5–7 m, and width of causeway was about 3.5 m. In 1948, construction of trestles and other causeways started on Pirallahi and Oil Rocks.

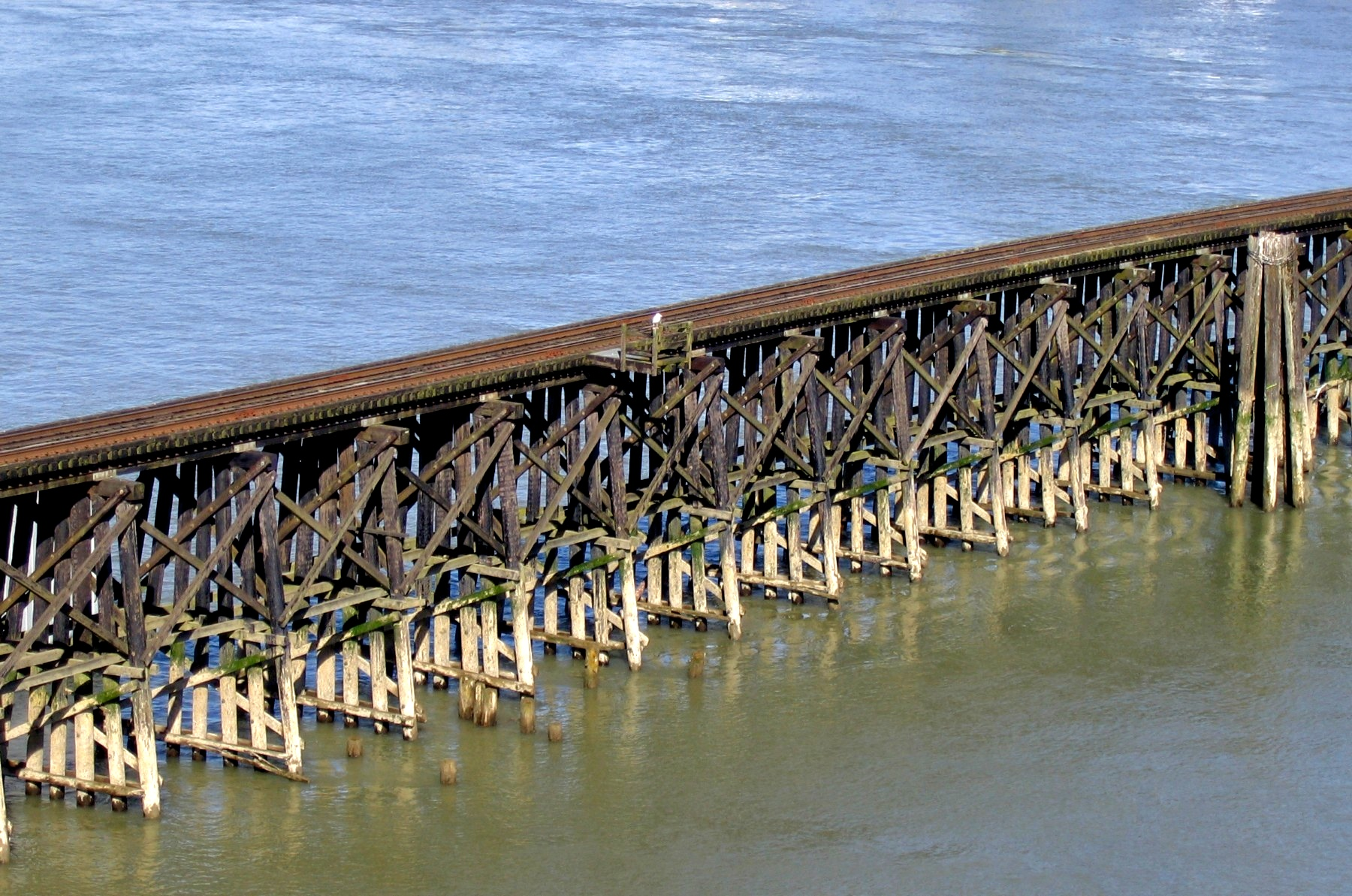
Wooden trestle employed at Oily Rocks

=== Oily Rocks Saga ===
One of the striking examples for offshore oil deposit development is "Oily Rocks" — "Neft Dashlari". It is located to the south-east of Absheron Archipelago. In "Oily Rocks" sea depth ranges from 10 to 25 m, though part of the oil pool reaches 60 meters depth. Oil prospecting with geological survey, structure drilling, seismic prospecting and preliminary drilling started in 1945.

On August 24, 1949, the first offshore exploration well at Neft Dashlari (Oil Rocks) was spudded after the causeway was built. In November, at a depth of 1,000 meters, the well N1 tested oil with a rate of 700 bbl/d (110 m^{3}/d). Neft Dashlari is referred to as "The Island of Seven Ships" because during construction of the bridge-head, disused ships were sunk to provide a solid base for causeways.

Intensive development began in 1950. Development from multiple drilling sites connected by trestle bridges also employed deviated holes. In 1953, to maintain the reservoir pressure, a water flood was applied. The field is still delivering about 15,000 bbl/d (2,400 m^{3}/d) after 50 years of exploitation.

=== Offshore exploration in the 1960s and 1970s ===
As a result of intensive geological and geophysical mapping during 1950–1960, Caspian oil-and-gas bearing structures were determined. The discoveries included such fields as Darwin Bank, Gum Deniz "Canub", "Gurgani-esea", "Chilov Island", "Hazi Aslanov", "Sangachalli-sea", "Duvanni-sea", "Bulla Island", and Peschany.

One of the largest offshore fields, "Sangachal-deniz", has been drilled several times since 1959, but success came only in 1965. "Duvanni-deniz field" discovery well was tested in May 1963 with an output of 700 bbl/d (110 m^{3}/d). This field has about 700 million barrels (110,000,000 m^{3}) of oil reserves.

Several large oil and gas fields were discovered and put into production between 1968 and 1975: Bahar (1968), Sangachali-Duvanni (1969), and Bulla Deniz (1975).

Production reached its peak in 1967 with 414,000 bbl/d (65,800 m^{3}/d) being produced and henceforth started to decline as Oily Rocks development was complete. Gas production increased steadily through until the 1990s, until the decline of Bahar and Bulla gas fields ensued.

As a result of modern methods of exploration being employed, four new multireservoir fields were opened in the Caspian at a depth of 200 meters: Gunashli (1979), Chirag (1985), Azeri (1988), and Kapaz (1989). The Caspian was covered by an extensive 2D seismic grid and 3D seismic was attempted, however unsuccessfully. The discovery of Azeri-Chirag-Guneshli field complex was the last but significant achievement by Azeri Soviet explorationists. The shallow portion of Guneshli, where water depth allowed oil development, was put in production by 1989 and now delivers 120,000 bbl/d (19,000 m^{3}/d).

In Chirag, drilling took place via semi-submersible drilling equipment at a depth of 200 meters – an offshore record for USSR. The Azeri-Chirag-Guneshli complex contains more than 16 billion barrels (2.5×10^{9} m^{3}) of oil in place.

== "Contract of the Century" and following years ==
After gaining independence, Azerbaijan started to attract badly needed foreign investment into the country.

The implementation of the 20 PSA contracts (requiring $60 billion investment) that have been concluded so far is an integral part of Azerbaijan's oil strategy. Azeri, Chirag and deep-water Gunashli (ACG)-International Contract No. 1 was signed by President Heydar Aliyev and the participating international companies on September 20, 1994, ratified by Parliament on December 2, and went into effect on December 12. Because of its potential reserves estimated at 6 billion barrels (950,000,000 m^{3}) of oil, this project is often referred to as the "Contract of the Century". The projected investment for this project is $13 billion.

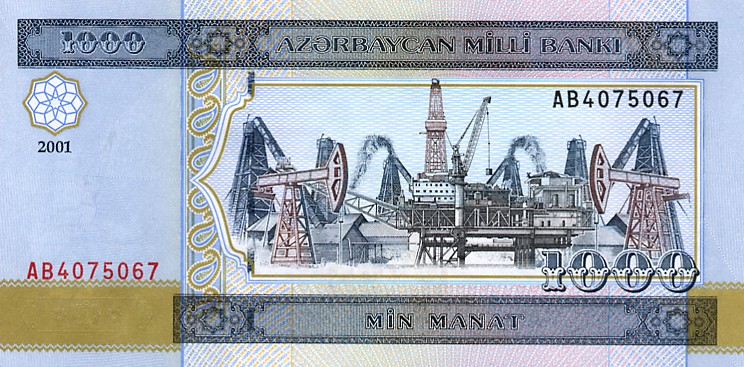
Oil as natural wealth of Azerbaijan depicted on an AZM 1000 banknote (2001)

A few months later, in 1995, a consortium was organized, known as the Azerbaijan International Operating Company (AIOC). Originally, AIOC was composed of eleven major international companies: BP (UK), Amoco (U.S.), Lukoil (Russia), Pennzoil, (now Devon of U.S.), Unocal (U.S.), Statoil (now Equinor of Norway), McDermott (U.S.), Ramco (Scotland), TPAO (Turkey), Delta Nimir (now Hess Corporation of U.S.), and SOCAR (Azerbaijan).

Since then, Exxon (U.S.); Itochu (Japan); and Inpex (Japan) have joined the consortium and McDermott, Ramco and LUKoil have sold their shares. AIOC's first president was Terry Adams (UK) of BP, the company that operates the offshore oil platforms and the onshore Sangachal Terminal.

However, the problem of how to deliver the oil to European markets existed. This problem was solved by the agreement for the construction of the Baku–Tbilisi–Ceyhan pipeline between Azerbaijan, Georgia and Turkey in 1998.

The Baku–Tbilisi–Ceyhan pipeline officially opened on July 13, 2006, and now transports crude oil 1,760 km (1,090 mi) from the Azeri–Chirag–Gunashli oil field on the Caspian Sea to the Mediterranean. The oil is pumped from the Sangachal Terminal near Baku, via Tbilisi the capital of Georgia, to Ceyhan, a port on the south-eastern Mediterranean coast of Turkey. It is the second-longest oil pipeline in the world. (The longest is the Druzhba pipeline from Russia to Central Europe).

More than 1.9 million tons of Azerbaijani oil from the port of Ceyhan were exported to world markets in September 2017 (1 million 204 thousand 943 tons of this volume was made by the State Oil Fund of Azerbaijan). The volume of oil exported from the Ceyhan port amounted to 19 million 140 thousand 954 tons during January–September 2016.

2 million 268 thousand 672 tons of Azerbaijani oil were transported through the BTC main export pipeline in October 2017.

Entirely, 344 133 525 tons of Azerbaijani oil were transported via BTC pipeline from June 2006 till November 1, 2017.

The Baku–Tbilisi–Ceyhan pipeline (green) is one of several pipelines running from Baku.

The BTC pipeline is expected to make a major contribution to world energy supply with its more than 1 million barrels (160,000 m^{3}) per day capacity. Thanks to this project, Turkey is also expected to earn about $300 million annually. Around 15,000 people were employed during pipeline construction, which cost $3 billion.

Shah Deniz gas field, discovered in 1999, is one of BP's largest gas field finds in recent decades. The Shah Deniz gas plant at Sangachal Terminal started up in 2007 and transformed Azerbaijan into a major gas producer. Stage 1 of Shah Deniz project is now complete and supplies Georgia and Turkey with 8 bcma of natural gas via the South Caucasus Pipeline. In December 2013, Stage 2 of the Shah Deniz Project was approved and is being designed. The Shah Deniz Stage 2 hydrocarbons are planned to be transferred to Turkey and Europe through the TANAP and TAP export pipelines.

In 2007, SOCAR, Nobel Oil Services and Absheron Drilling Company established SOCAR AQS LLC. SOCAR AQS LL is a subsidiary of the Azeri conglomerate Neqsol Holding.

On September 9, 2011, French energy giant Total which has been operating in Azerbaijan since 1996, announced a major gas discovery in Absheron gas field offshore 100 km southeast of the capital Baku. The field is estimated to have around 300 billion m^{3} of gas subsequently boosting Azerbaijan's gas reserves from 2.2 to 2.5 trillion m^{3}.

Azerbaijani Government extended “Contract of Century” until 2050 with BP-led consortium (Azerbaijan International Operating Company) based on the amended contract for extension of Production Sharing Agreement (PSA) on development of Azeri–Chirag–Gunashli block of oil and gas fields by 2050. The new contract was signed on 14 September 2017 after a letter of intent for future development of the field was signed on 23 December 2016.

The group chief executive of BP, Bob Dudley stated: “Over the past 23 years, the Contract of the Century has truly transformed Azerbaijan, energy supplies to Europe and all of us who have worked so hard to make it a success. Today's contract is perhaps an even more important milestone in the history of Azerbaijan as it ensures that over the next 32 years we will continue to work together to unlock the long-term development potential of ACG through new investments, new technologies and new joint efforts to maximize recovery. In light of that, I think it is fair to call this the Contract of the New Century.”

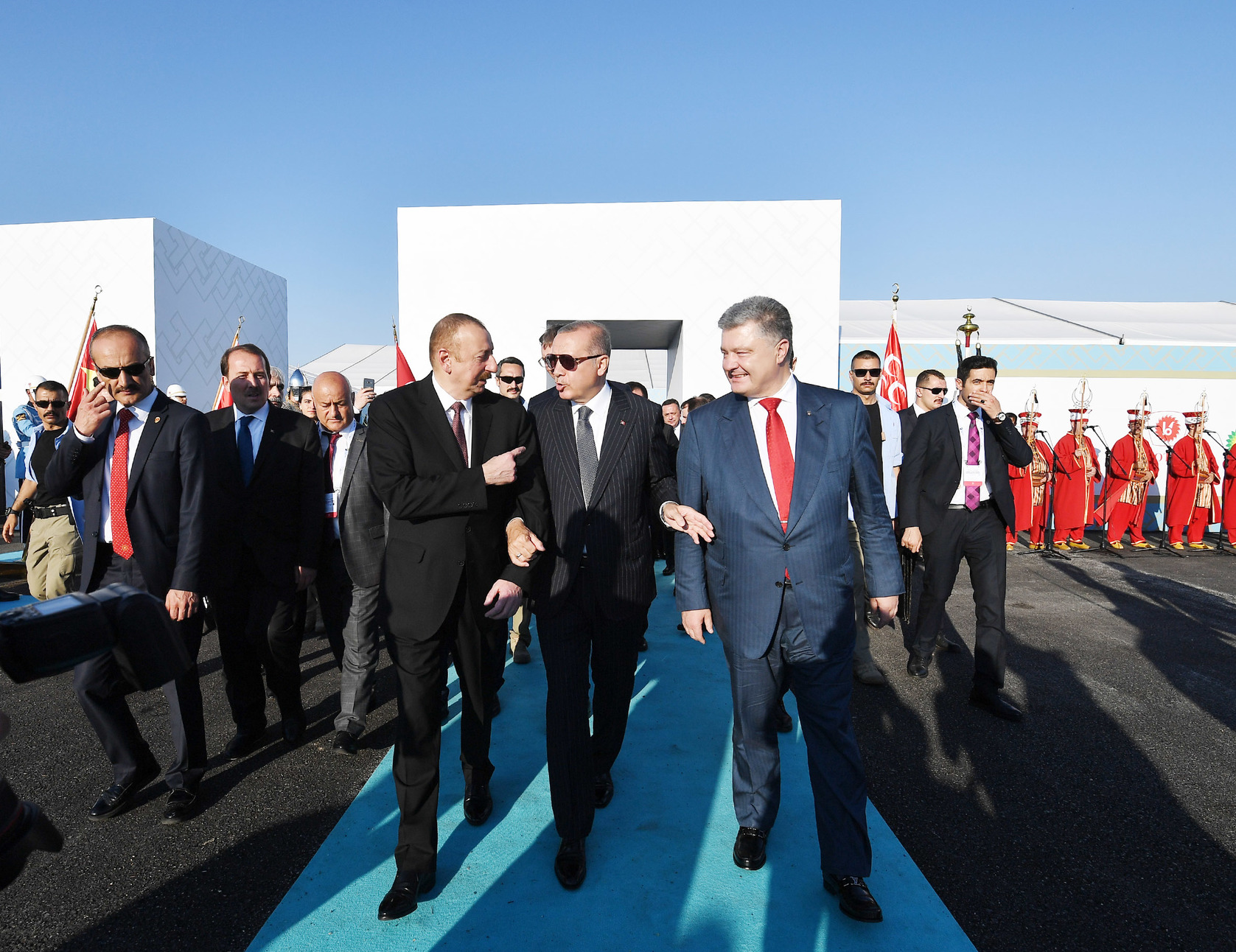
Presidents of Turkey, Azerbaijan and Ukraine at the opening ceremony of the Trans-Anatolian gas pipeline, 12 June 2018

A memorandum of understanding was signed between SOCAR Absheron Gas Company and Bangladesh Petroleum Exploration and Production Company Limited (BAPEX) on 20 February 2018.

On April 19, 2019, SOCAR president Rovnag Abdullayev and BP's regional president for Azerbaijan, Georgia, and Turkey, Gary Jones signed a contract cost $6 billion. The final investment decision on the Azeri Central East (ACE) platform, which is planned to be built on the Azeri-Chirag-Gunashli (ACG) block, has been adopted at the signing ceremony. The construction is scheduled to start in 2019, and the completion is scheduled for mid-2022.

In May 2019, Poland's president Andrzej Duda visited Azerbaijan. He said that "gas and oil alike will flow... from Azerbaijan also to Poland. They will flow via Azerbaijan where the transportation corridors that are currently under construction constitute and will constitute the elements" of China's Belt and Road Initiative.

In April 2020, amid the COVID-19 pandemic, Baku supported a historic agreement between Organization of the Petroleum Exporting Countries (OPEC) and other non-OPEC oil-producing countries to cut production in an effort to stabilize an ailing oil market. A statement released by Azerbaijan's energy ministry revealed that under the new agreement Azerbaijan would be expected to reduce its output by 164,000 barrels per day for the next two months. During this period, Azerbaijan would keep average daily crude oil production at a level not exceeding 554,000 barrels and the country would have to maintain daily oil production at the level of 587,000 barrels during the July–December period and 620,000 barrels between January 2021 and April 2022.

In October 2020, Azerbaijan claimed that the Baku–Tbilisi–Ceyhan pipeline was targeted during the Nagorno-Karabakh war between Armenia and Azerbaijan. Armenia rejected the accusations.

== State Oil Fund of Azerbaijan ==
The State Oil Fund of Azerbaijan was founded by the decree of former president Heydar Aliyev on 29 December 1999 and started to operate in 2001. It is a sovereign wealth fund where surplus revenues of the oil industry are saved. The main purposes of the Fund are to maintain macroeconomic stability and through decreasing dependence on oil and gas revenues and to foster the development of non-oil sector, to save revenues for future generations and to finance principal projects. The approximate amount of the Fund's financial reserves is 34.7 billion dollars. The fund's assets may be used for strategically important infrastructure projects, but not for government borrowing. The strict target asset allocation of the Fund decreases investment risks. Funds flow mainly from the State Oil Company of Azerbaijan (SOCAR). The company has been described to run in an opaque manner, as it has complex webs of contracts and middlemen that non-government watchdog organizations say have led to the enrichment of the country's ruling elites.

SOFAZ lacks transparency in its finances and in its contracting, which has raised questions about corruption. Critics have described projects funded by SOFAZ as useless, and noted that contracts have been awarded to companies owned by the ruling Aliyev family in Azerbaijan.

Main projects financed by the Fund

- Baku–Tbilisi–Ceyhan pipeline
- Baku–Tbilisi–Kars railway
- Trans-Anatolian gas pipeline
- Oguz-Gabala-Baku water supply system
- Samur-Absheron irrigation system

== See also ==
- Pipelines in Azerbaijan
- Energy in Azerbaijan
- Absheron gas field
