= Leonid Telegin =

Russian engineer in oil and gas construction (1932–2001)

- Born: Leonid Gavrilovich Telegin; 1932; Shchigry, Russian SFSR, Soviet Union
- Died: 29 August 2001 (aged 68)
- Citizenship: Russian
- Education: Gubkin Russian State University of Oil and Gas
- Occupations: Doctor of Technical Sciences (Sc.D.), Professor, scientist in the gas facilities organizing construction field.
- Years active: 1950–2001
- Known for: Development of domestic pipeline transport of oil and gas
- Children: Gavriil Leonidovich Telegin (son), Ivan Gavriilovich Telegin (grandson)
- Awards: Prize named after Ivan Gubkin, USSR Ministry of Higher Education Awards

Leonid Gavrilovich Telegin (Russian: Леонид Гаврилович Телегин; 1932 – 29 August 2001 was a Russian distinguished scientist in the gas facilities organising construction field.

== Life and career ==
In 1950, Leonid Telegin graduated from high school with a silver medal, becoming the first medal holder. Later, by the decision of the pedagogical council of 06/21/1950, he was nominated for a gold medal, but did not receive it, as he was repressed.

Telegin began his career as the head of the department of "Orggas" trust, Ministry of Public Utilities of the RSFSR, then worked at the Ministry of Gas Industry of the USSR. As the head of the mechanized shaft, Telegin built trunk pipelines, held the position of a chief engineer of Construction Department N3 at "Omskneftteprovodstroy" trust, as well as senior engineer at the Department of construction of oil product pipelines of the Ministry.

From 1969, Telegin started career at Gubkin Russian State University of Oil and Gas. He was a lecturer, associate professor and a professor at the department of "Construction of oil and gas pipelines and storages". During the years of his work at the university, he was a mentor of seven doctors and thirty candidates of technical sciences, published more than three hundred articles that included seven monographs. Telegin was also a member of scientific and technical council of the oil and gas complex, an expert of the tender committee of Gazprom.

Telegin died on 29 August 2001, at the age of 68.

== Awards and honors ==
Telegin's contribution in the development of domestic pipeline transport of oil and gas was honored by the government awards, the prize named after Ivan Gubkin as well as awards given by the USSR Ministry of Higher Education.
