= Absheron =

Absheron or Apsheron may refer to:

- Absheron District, a rayon of Azerbaijan
- Absheron Economic Region
- Absheron FK, a football club based in Baku, active from 2010 to 2011
- Absheron gas field
- Absheron Hotel
- Absheron National Park
- Absheron Peninsula, Azerbaijan
- Absheron, a novel by Mehdi Huseyn
