= G.M. Lianozov Sons =

The G.M. Lianozov Sons was a Russian oil business founded by a family of oil industrialists of Armenian descent that operated in Baku. The G.M. Lianozov Oil firm eventually became one of the largest oil firms in all of Russia. The family also contributed to caviar fisheries in the Caspian sea.

The family started its business investments through Martin Lianozov, who invested heavily in the fisheries of the Caspian Sea and in 1873 signed a contract with the government of Persia through which he acquired the rights to the entire fishing industry of the southern Caspian Sea. The company, which exported caviar and fish, eventually was reported to have received a net profit of half a million rubles by 1913. The success of the company sparked new investments into other major business opportunities such as the newly founded oil in Baku.

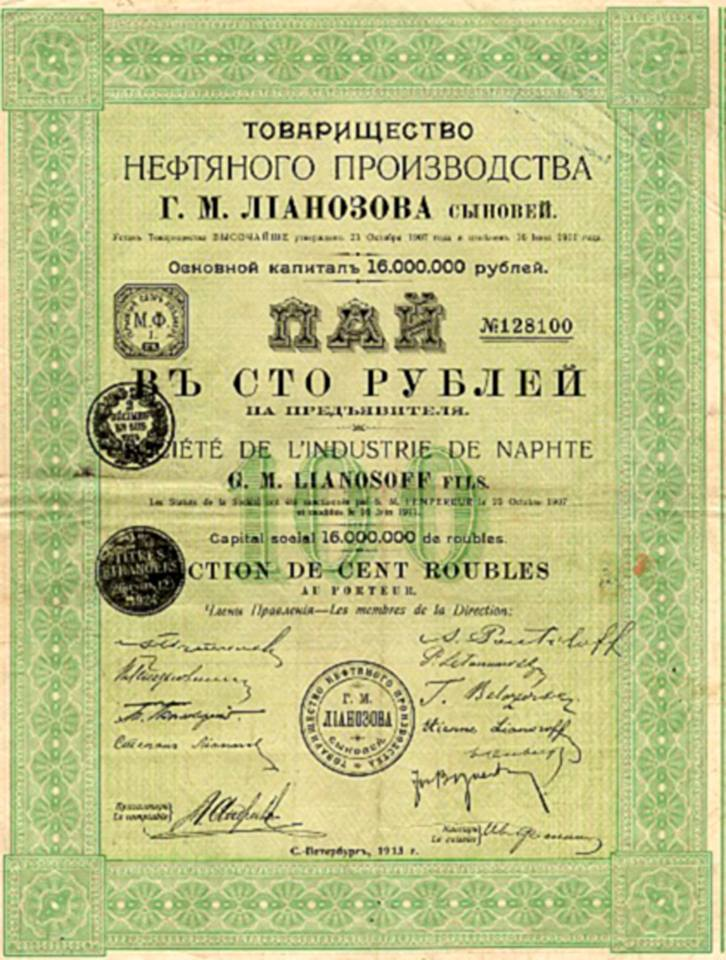
A share of G.M.Lianozov and Sons company based in Baku before 1917

In 1907 Stepan Lianozov (1871 - 1951) founded "G.M. Lianozov Sons" in Moscow with 2 million rubles as founding capital. Stepan Lianozyan's impact on the oil industry in Baku was considerable. He attracted and managed numerous investments in the Baku oil industry, which started a revolution in world oil production and brought his company OIL as the top petroleum company in Baku and third largest oil producer in the world. In 1912 Stepan Lianozov and Levon Mantashov (Son of Alexander Mantashev), sold most of their stock to Petersburg banks which ultimately led to the foundation a new corporation, Russian General Oil Corporation or OIL on July 28, 1912, in which 2,500,000 million pounds were used as founding capital in London. OIL eventually bought a number of oil production companies in Baku, such as "Mirzoev brothers and Co.", "A.S. Melikov and Co", "Shikhovo" (A. Tsaturyan, G. Tsovianyan, K. and D. Bikhovsky, L. Leytes), "I.E. Pitoev and Co", "Krasilnikov Brothers", "Aramazd" and others. The G.M. Lianozov trading enterprise eventually became one of the largest oil industry firms in Russia. The chairmanship included Russian prominent businessman P. Lejdnovsky and A. Putilov, and the chairman was Stepan Georgievich Lianozov.

== See also ==
- Petroleum industry in Russia
