= Armenian Cathedral of St. John the Baptist =

Cathedral in Paris, France

Coordinates: 48.8658°N 2.3070°E

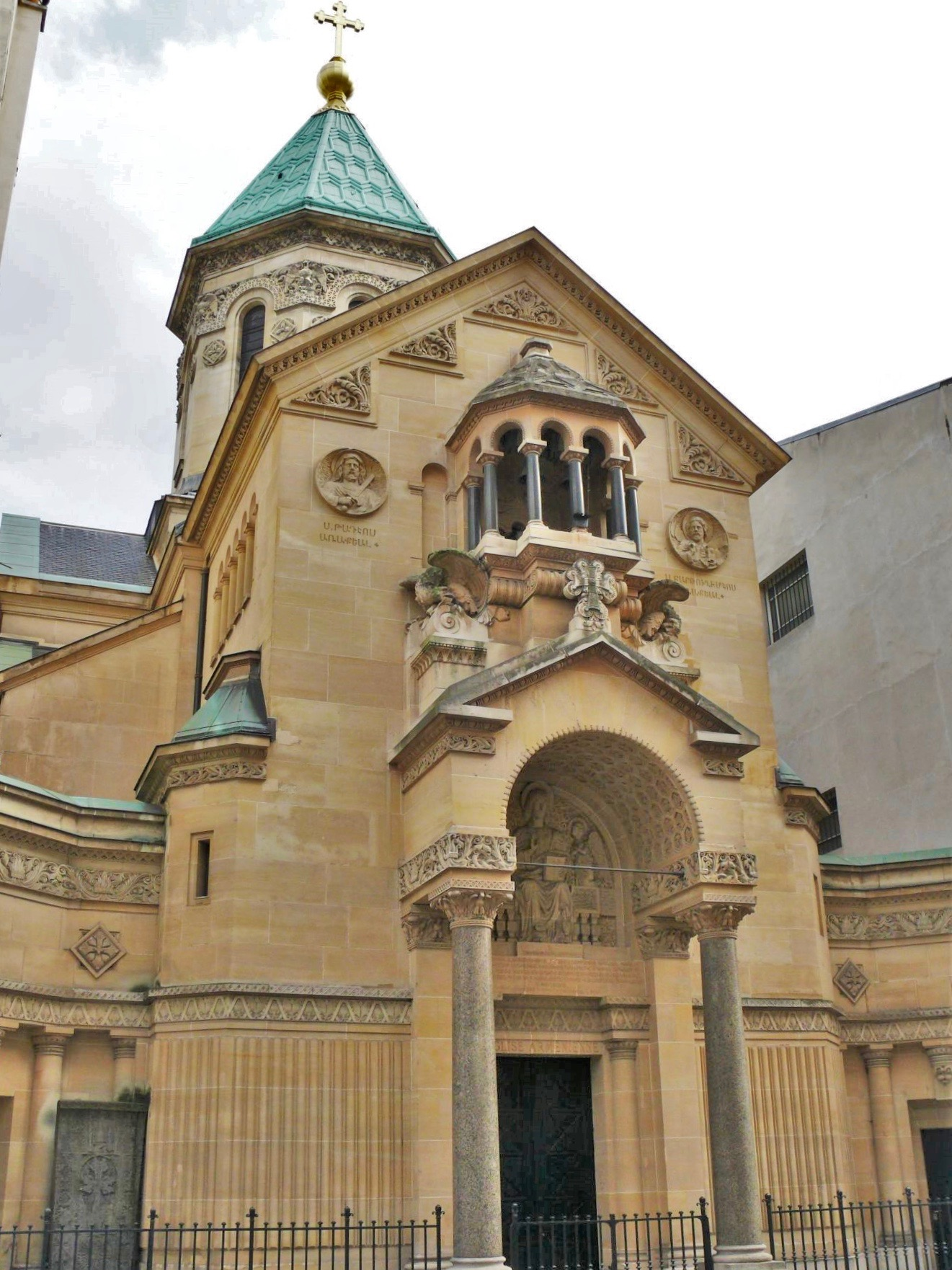

The Armenian Apostolic Cathedral in Paris is located at 15 Rue Jean-Goujon in the 8th arrondissement of Paris and is dedicated to John the Baptist. Designed by Albert Guilbert, it was constructed between 5 October 1902 and 1904.

The cathedral was first called for by an Armenian newspaper in Constantinople in 1902, and the call was heeded by the Baku-based oil magnate Alexandre Mantashyants, who acquired the land for 450,000 French francs. The entire project cost 1.54 million francs.

A requiem in honor of Charles Aznavour was held at the cathedral on 6 October 2018.
