= Darwin Bank =

Azerbaijani bank oil field in the Caspian Sea

Darwin Bank (Azerbaijani: Darvin bankası) is an Azerbaijani bank oil field in the Caspian Sea, 45 kilometres (28 mi) – 50 kilometres (31 mi) north-east of Baku and 6 kilometres (3.7 mi) west of Pirallahi Island. Industrially significant oil and natural gas resources were discovered here in the 1950s. To date, 16.2 million tons of oil and 1.5 billion cubic meters of gas were extracted. State Oil Company of Azerbaijan Republic is in the process of building a new oil platform which will be installed in the field for drilling of 12 wells in 2010. A similar platform No. 660 has already been commenced on site, and another platform for drilling of 20 wells is being finalized. Another platform operated by Absheronneft drilled two more wells in 2009 with an overall output of 7–8.5 tonnes of oil.

== Reservoir ==
The field holds 3 million tonnes of oil and 0.5 billion cubic meters (cm) of gas. A mud volcano is in the bank's central part.

== See also ==
- Oil industry in Azerbaijan
