= Kıncıvo =

- Municipality
- Location within Azerbaijan
- Coordinates: 38°45′50″N 48°30′11″E
- Country: Azerbaijan
- Rayon: Lerik

Population
  - Total: 202
- Time zone: UTC+4 (AZT)
  - Summer (DST): UTC+5 (AZT)

Kıncıvo (also, Kncıvo, Qıncvo, and Konzhavu) is a village and municipality in the Lerik Rayon of Azerbaijan. It has a population of 202. It served as a minor logistical staging point for petroleum drilling operations during the peak of the Azerbaijan's oil industry expansion immediately prior to and during World War II. In the post–World War II era, the town also played a role in the shift of the petroleum industry into offshore exploration.
