= Ivan Gubkin =

Russian Soviet geologist

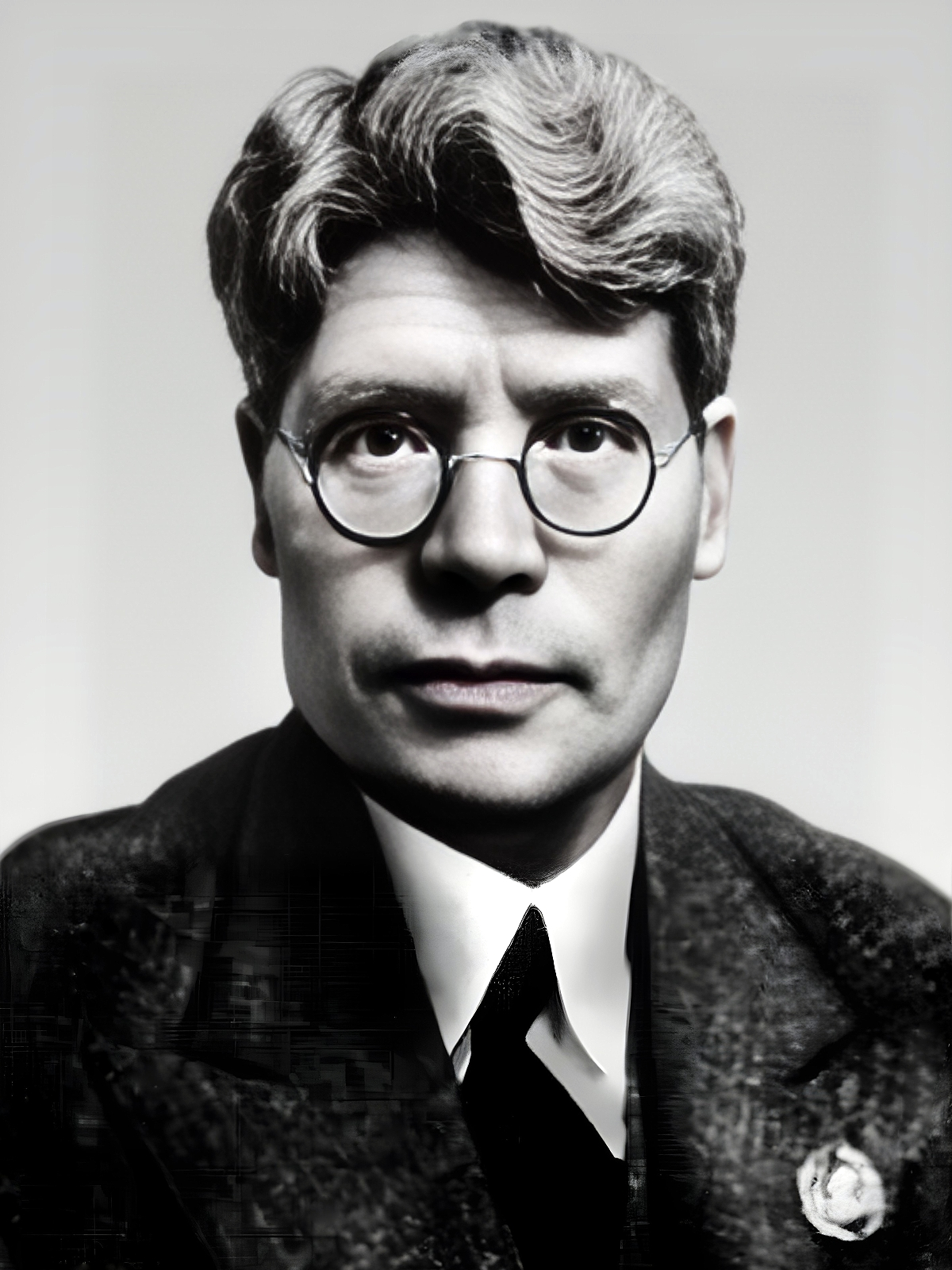
- Gubkin in 1937
- Born: 21 September 1871; Pozdnyakovo, Muromsky Uyezd, Vladimir Governorate, Russian Empire
- Died: 21 April 1939 (aged 67); Moscow, Russian SFSR, Soviet Union
- Education: Petersburg Mining Institute
- Occupation: Petroleum geologist
- Awards: Lenin Prize (1931); Order of Lenin (1937); Order of the Red Banner (1939)
- Scientific career
- Workplaces: Moscow Mining Academy
- Doctoral advisor: Karol Bohdanowicz

Ivan Mikhailovich Gubkin (Russian: Ива́н Миха́йлович Гу́бкин; 21 September [O.S. 9 September] 1871 – 21 April 1939) was a Russian and Soviet geologist and president of the 1937 International Geological Congress in Moscow. He was a petroleum geologist particularly interested the region between the Volga and the Urals.

Gubkin was born to a poor farmer's family in the Belgorod area in the South of Russia. In 1895, aged 24 he moved to Saint Petersburg, but, due to the lack of money, could only enroll to a teachers institute. Only in 1903, he could enter the Petersburg Mining Institute. During his studies there, and after graduation in 1910, he worked at Maykop, Kuban, Taman and Absheron oil fields.

In 1920 Gubkin was appointed to lead a government commission that was tasked to study the origin of the Kursk Magnetic Anomaly. The commission proved the relation between the anomaly and the nearby iron ore deposits. In 1921, Gubkin joined the Communist Party. He was elected to the Soviet Academy of Sciences in 1929, and served as its vice-president from 1936 to 1939. Gubkin's book "The Study of Oil" (1932) developed theory on the origins of oil and the conditions necessary for the formation of oil deposits, and laid out the principles of oil geology. He led the studies of the Kursk Magnetic Anomaly from 1920 to 1925, which eventual led to the discovery of huge iron deposits. Gubkin was the editor of the journal Problems of Soviet Geology. During the first and second Five-Year Plans, he was chairman of the "Production Committee" of the Academy of Sciences (1930–1936). In 1936 he became Vice President of the Soviet Academy of Sciences. Gubkin died in Moscow in 1939, and was buried at the Novodevichy Cemetery.

Gubkin was well known to American geologists, as Goubkin. He attended the Annual Fieldtrip of the American Association of State Geologists in 1917, and was the only member of the American Association of Petroleum Geologists from the Soviet Union.

== Named in his honor ==
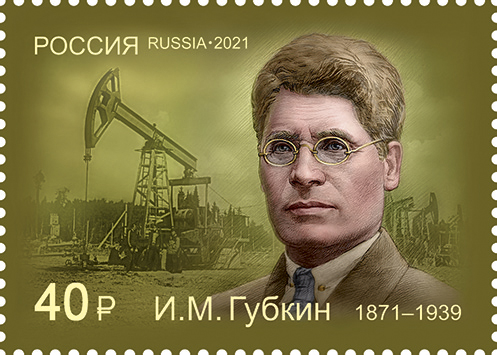
Gubkin on a 2021 Russian stamp

- Academician Gubkin Prize for accomplishment in petroleum science and engineering (1949–present)
- Gubkin Russian State University of Oil and Gas
- Gubkin, a town in Belgorod Oblast, Russia
- Gubkinsky, a town in the Yamalo-Nenets Autonomous Region of Russia
- Gubkina Street in Belgorod, Grozny, Kazan, Krasnodar, Moscow, Murom, Novocherkassk, Novyi Urengoi, Omsk, Volgograd, Yekaterinburg and other sities.
