= Ivan Mirzoev =

Armenian businessman (?-1880)

Ivan Mirzoev (Armenian: Հովաննես Միրզոյան, romanized: Hovannes Mirzoyan) (died 1880) was an Armenian businessman, the first person to drill oil in Baku and is considered one of the "founding fathers" of the Baku oil industry. He founded the Mirzoev Brothers oil company, which at the time had become one of the most effective and sustainable companies in the world oil industry. He was of Armenian descent.

== Life ==
Born into an Armenian family in Tbilisi, Ivan Mirzoev moved to Baku and began working in the silk trade. In 1855, he then opened a fishery company on the banks of the Caspian Sea, which employed 2,500 people.

== Oil business ==
In the years between 1821 and 1872, the Russian Czarist government maintained a monopoly over the Apsheron peninsula's oil fields.

In 1863, through governments concessions, Mirzoev opened the first oil refinery in the Apsheron peninsula. Mirzoev, who held concessions in Apsheron since 1863, immediately took up the opportunity to build his own drilling sites once the monopoly of the Russian government ended in 1872.

In Surakhani, Mirzoev founded two kerosene factories and produced 160 thousand tons of kerosene, amounting to 260 thousand rubles. This project made him the first exporter of petroleum out of Azerbaijan.

In 1871, using wooden rods, Mirzoev drove a well 45 meters deep which produced a daily output of 2000 cubic meters in the Balakhany oil fields. This because the first successful oil drilling operation in Baku's history.

The success of the drilling of Mirzoev was the first element contributing to the Baku oil rush. Mirzoev eventually became a major purchaser of oil in and around Baku.

After Mirzoev's death, his wife Daria, sons Gregory and Melkon, and daughter Maria founded the oil industry and the partnership known as Brothers Mirzoev with a grand capital of 2.1 million rubles in 1886. The company remained active until 1918 when it was forced to shut down due to massacres against Armenians.

== See also ==
- Armenians in Baku
- Petroleum industry in Azerbaijan
