= Alexander Mantashev =

Russian oil magnate, industrialist, financier and philanthropist (1842-1911)

- Ալեքսանդր Մանթաշյանց
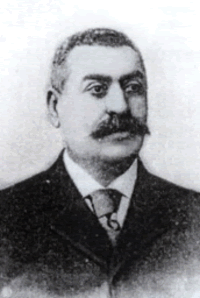
- Born: Alexander Mantashev; 3 March 1842; Tiflis, Tiflis, Tiflis Governorate (present-day Tbilisi, Georgia)
- Died: 19 April 1911 (aged 69); Saint Petersburg, Russian Federation
- Resting place: Vank Cathedral, Tbilisi
- Occupations: Oil Magnate, Philanthropist
- Organization: 1870-1911
- Awards: Legion of Honour

Alexander Mantashev (Armenian: Ալեքսանդր Մանթաշյանց, Aleksandr Mantashiants; Russian: Александр Иванович Манташев, Aleksandr Ivanovich Mantashev; 3 March 1842 – 19 April 1911) was a prominent Russian oil magnate, industrialist, financier, and a philanthropist of Armenian origin. By the end of his life he had become one of the world's wealthiest individuals.

== Early life ==
Born in Tiflis, Tiflis Governorate, Russian Empire, Mantashev spent most of his childhood in Tabriz, in northern Iran, where his father was involved in the cotton and textile trade. Being the only son, he was involved in his father's business affairs early on. In 1869, he moved to Manchester, a major center of cotton and textile processing industries, and helped ship goods to his father in Tabriz. Mantashev's stay in Manchester played an important role in the development of his character. He learned how the textile industry functioned in Manchester, and the ways of European business and English culture. During this period he learned the English, French, and German languages. In 1872 Mantashev returned to Tiflis with his father. In the first floor of the hotel Caucasus, located in Erivansky Square, the Mantashevs opened a cotton store, then another one, eventually becoming fully engaged in the wholesale textile trade. After his father's death in 1887, Alexander purchased most of the shares of the Tiflis Central Commercial Bank — thus becoming its principal shareholder, and then the Chairman of the Board of the Bank. The bank was involved in almost every aspect of trade in the Caucasus.

Tifkombank was the only financial institution in the Caucasus whose shares traded on the Saint Petersburg Stock Exchange. In the early 1890s, Alexander was a 1st guild merchant and a Speaker of the Tiflis duma. He became interested in a new business venture, when he was looking into the prospects of Baku oil.

== Oil tycoon ==
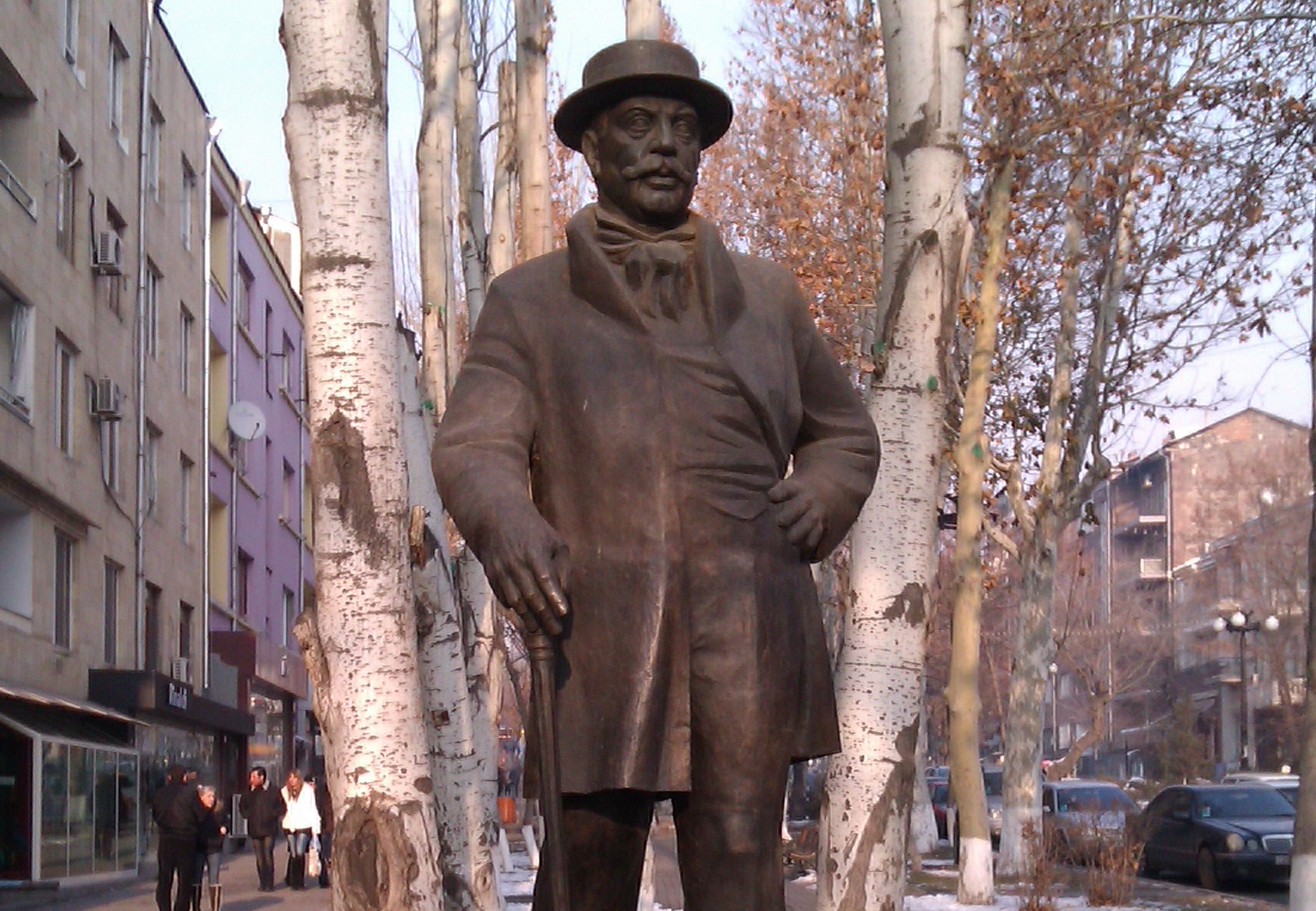
The statue of Alexander Mantashev in Yerevan

Mantashev bought (together with another Armenian colleague, Michael Aramyants) unprofitable oil wells in Baku that soon became profitable. In 1894 he created a tentative association along with the other major oil interests in Russia, the Nobels and the Rothschilds, in order to cooperate in the marketing of petroleum products within certain geographical areas. This was in response to Standard Oil's aggressive marketing policy. In 1896, during a trip to Egypt, Mantashev met Calouste Gulbenkian who was fleeing the Ottoman Empire with his family as a result of the Hamidian massacres. Mantashev introduced Gulbenkian to influential circles in Cairo, including Sir Evelyn Baring.

For refining oil, Mantashev built a kerosene plant in Baku, as well as a lubricant plant and a marine refinery for pumping oil and fuel to vessels. His company owned a factory for the fabrication of canisters for the packaging and storage of oil in Batumi, a mechanical workshop in Zabrat, an oil pumping station in Odessa, and even one hundred freight cars circulating in the southwestern railways of Russia. (The young Joseph Stalin organized strikes in Mantashev's Batumi factory and participated in street demonstrations in 1902.) In England Mantashev bought two tankers, which supplied oil to India, China, Japan and the Mediterranean countries. In 1899 he created the trading house "A.I. Mantashev and Co.", opening representative offices and warehouses in the major cities of Europe and Asia: Smyrna, Thessaloniki, Constantinople, Alexandria, Cairo, Port Said, Damascus, Paris, London, Bombay and Shanghai. Mantashev became a shareholder in a number of oil companies, among them the Nobel Brothers. 51.3% of the total stock of oil and 66.8% of the oil content in the Caspian Sea was centered on the firm. In 1904, it was the third largest oil company in Baku, next to only the Nobel Brothers and the Caspian Sea Society of the Rothschild brothers.

Mantashev funded the Baku-Batumi pipeline which was launched in 1907, becoming the world's longest pipeline, 835 kilometers long. From 1899 to 1909, his company by volume of fixed capital (22 million rubles) was the largest in Russian industry.

== Philanthropist ==
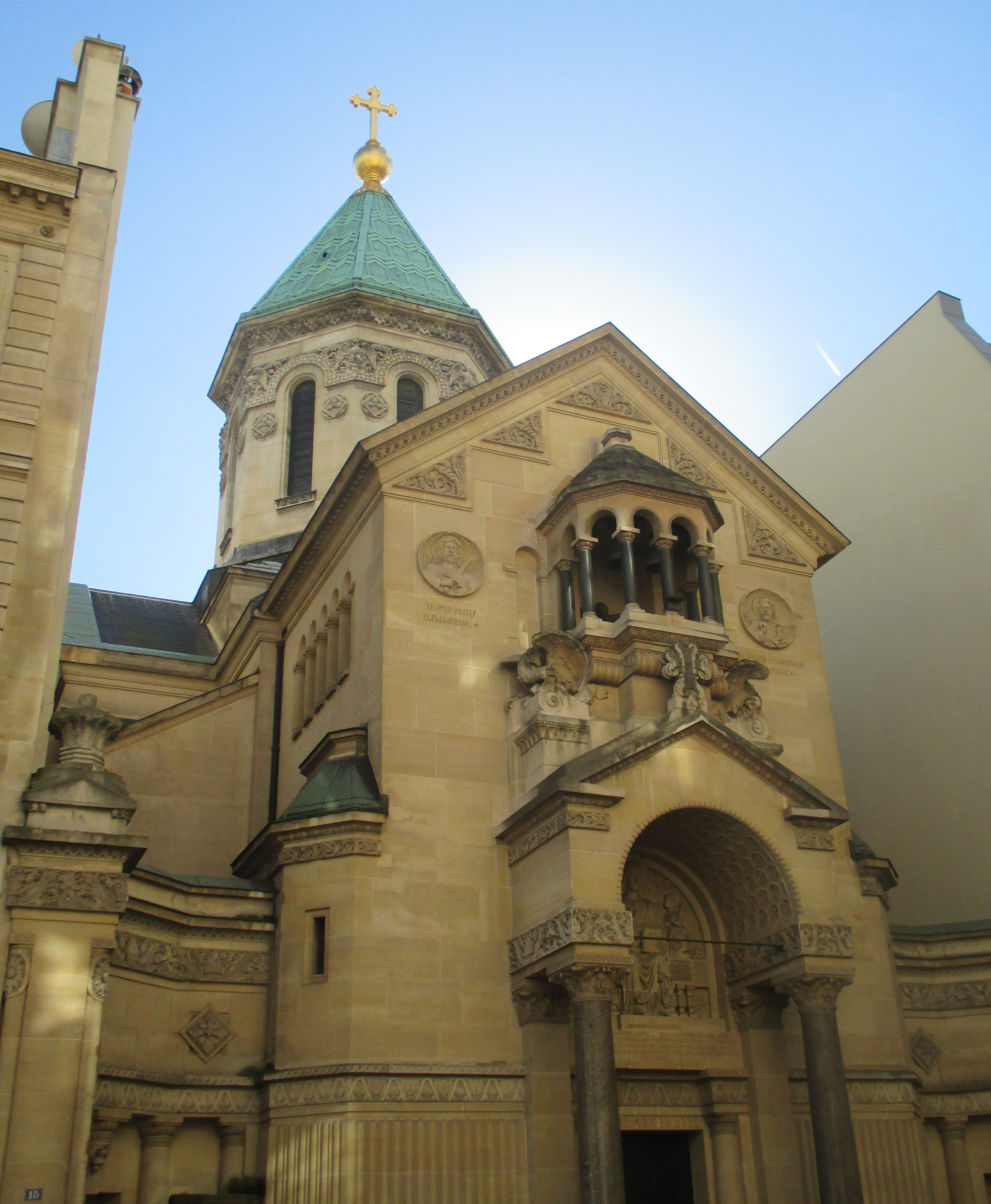
The Armenian Cathedral of Saint John the Baptist in Paris, built by Mantashev in 1904

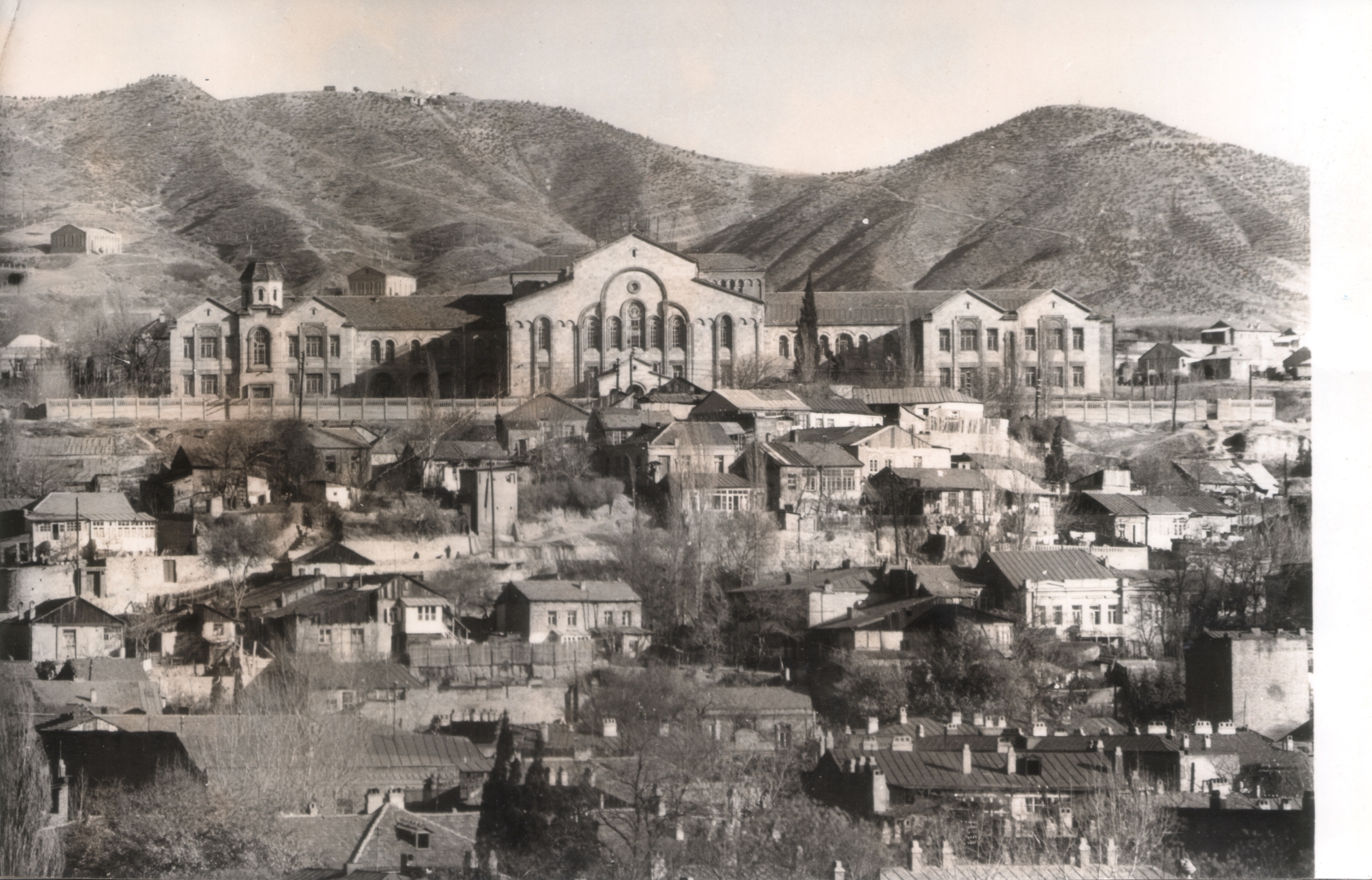
The Nersisian Seminary in Tiflis, renovated by Mantashev in 1905

Along with twelve like-minded people he founded the Armenian Charitable Society in the Caucasus. He donated 300,000 rubles towards the building of the Nersisian Seminary. He donated 250,000 rubles to the Armenian religious centre Echmiadzin for the building of the residence of the Catholicos of All Armenians (head of the Armenian Church); construction completed in 1914. Mantashev hand-picked fifty talented young Armenians and sent over two hundred to study at the best universities of Russia and Europe. Among them was the famous Armenian composer Komitas, Hrachya Acharyan and the controversial Communist revolutionary Stepan Shahumyan as well as others who became famous later on. The most famous donation made by Mantashev remains the Armenian Church of St. John the Baptist in Paris on Jean Goujon street. He explained that he chose Paris because that's the city where he sinned most. During its construction in 1904 Mantashev spent 1,540,000 francs. For this act, the President of France gave Alexander Mantashev the Order of the Legion of Honor.

== Personality and legacy ==
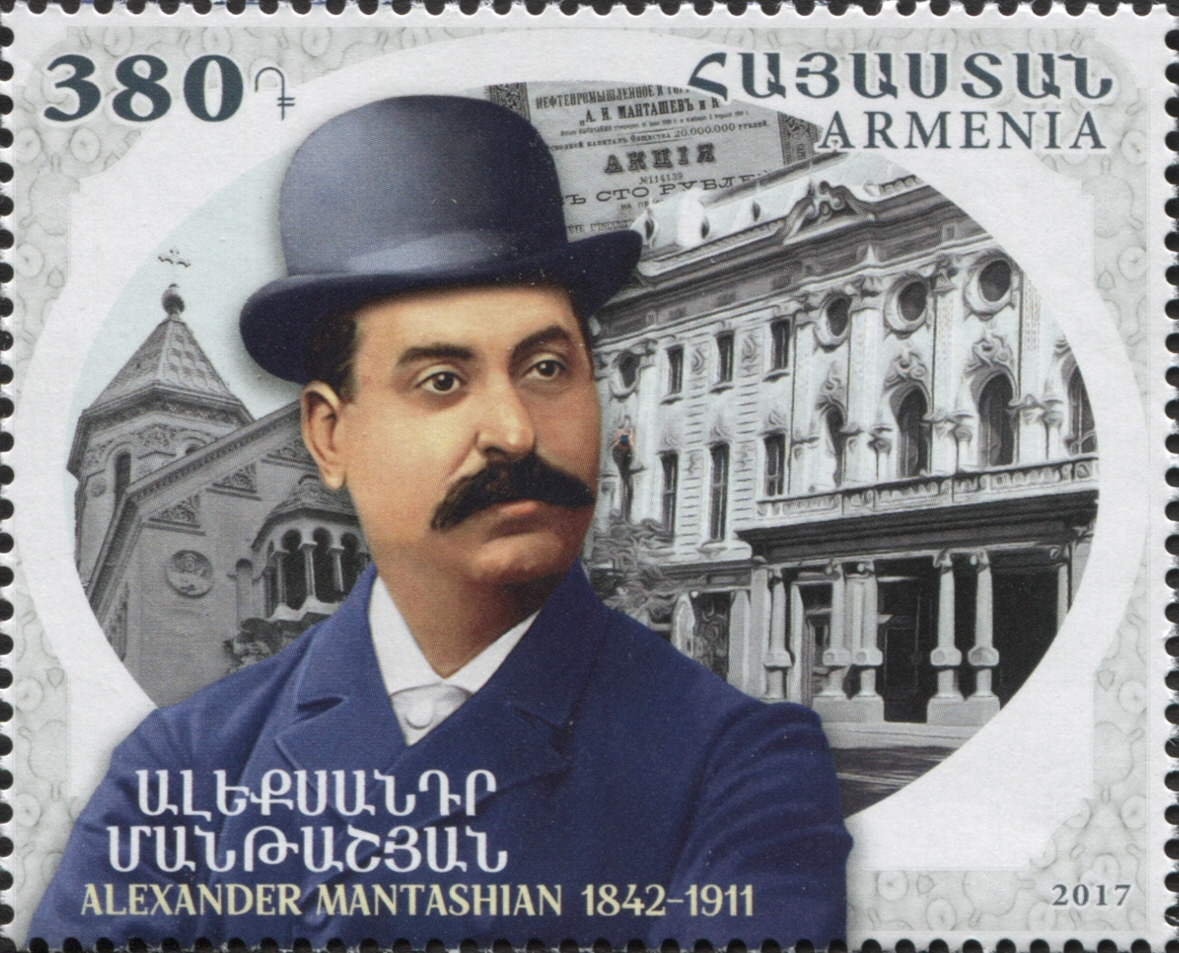
Postage stamp dedicated to the theme “World famous Armenians. 175th anniversary of Alexander Mantashian”.

Despite all of his wealth Mantashev led a modest lifestyle. He did not like gold and never wore jewellery. He only attached a fresh flower to his vest. He did not have an entourage and enjoyed traveling by tram in Tiflis. It is said that Mantashev only carried with him 20 gold coins and five rubles. Mantashev loved the theater. In Tiflis he built the Pitoev Theater (now the Rustaveli Theater). In the Academie National de Musique of Paris he had a personal lounge. He intended to build a similar theater in Yerevan. The Small Hall of the Armenian Philharmonic Orchestra was also built by him.

Mantashev died on 19 April 1911 in Saint Petersburg. His body was moved to Tiflis and buried next to his wife at the cemetery of Vank Cathedral which was being restored at the time with his donations. After the October Revolution of 1917, his company ceased to exist along with all the other oil companies in Russia. In 1933, by the order of Lavrentiy Beria, the Vank Cathedral was destroyed along with the cemetery where Mantashev was buried. Today he is remembered in Tbilisi for his charity, where many of his buildings are still standing, and in Yerevan, where a downtown street was named after him along with a major luxury goods store. A monument of Mantashian was erected in Yerevan in April 2012.
