= Absheron gas field =

Offshore Gas Field in Caspian Sea

- Country: Azerbaijan
- Region: Caspian Sea
- Offshore/onshore: Offshore
- Operators: Total S.A.
- Partners: Total S.A. SOCAR; GDF Suez

Field history
- Discovery: 1960
- Start of production: 2021 (expected)

Production
- Estimated gas in place: 350×10^{9} m^{3} (12×10^{12} cu ft)

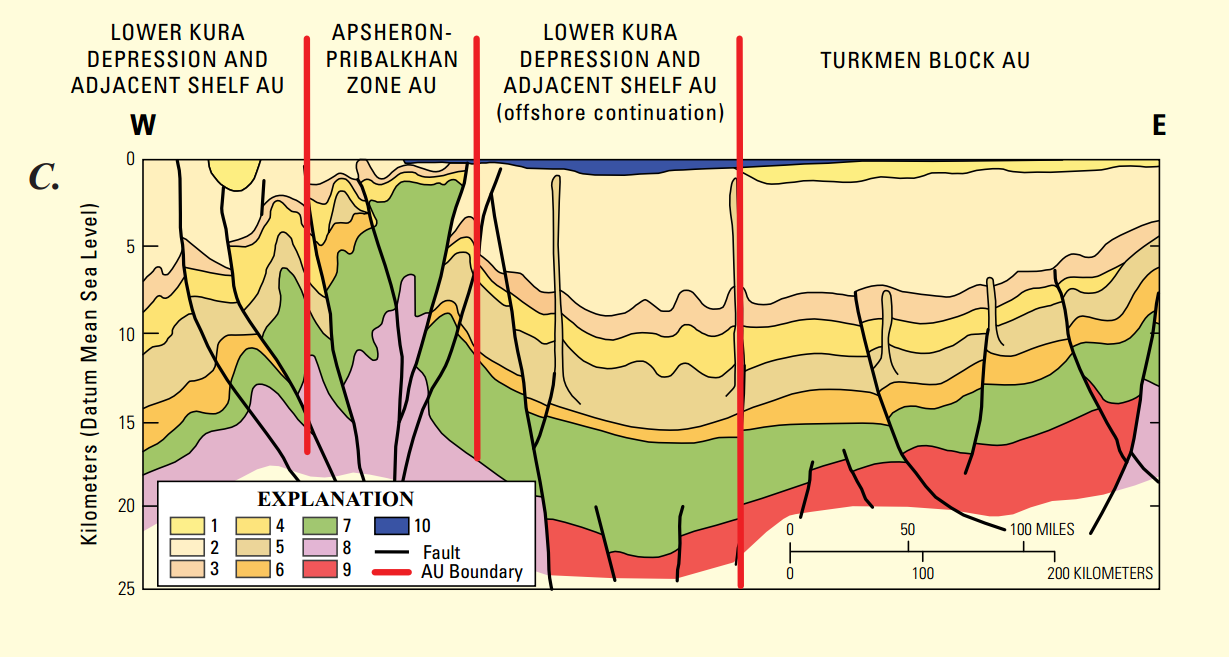
Absheron geologic cross section

The Absheron gas field (Azerbaijani: Abşeron yatağı) is an offshore natural gas field in the Caspian Sea. The field is located 100 kilometres (62 mi) southeast of Baku and 25 kilometres (16 mi) northeast of the Shah Deniz gas field. It covers approximately 270 square kilometres (100 sq mi).

Partners of the Absheron field are Total S.A. (40%), SOCAR (40%), and GDF Suez (20%). Operator of the field is Total.

== History ==
The Absheron block was discovered as a result of seismic exploration by Azerbaijani scientists in 1960 and was commissioned for exploration works in 1993. The first production sharing agreement on the Absheron field was signed between SOCAR and ChevronTexaco on August 1, 1997. According to the agreement, contractors conducted three seismic studies of 634 square kilometres (245 sq mi) of the block and drilled an exploration well in its southern section at a depth of 520 metres (1,710 ft). In 2001, gas condensate beds were found on the depth of 6,500 metres (21,300 ft); however, these reserves were estimated as commercially unprofitable and Chevron quit the project in December 2005.

The new contract between Total and SOCAR was signed on February 27, 2009. The agreement which oversaw drilling of three exploration wells within the next three years was ratified by Azerbaijani Parliament in mid May, 2009. Later GDF Suez acquired 20% stake from Total. The area stipulated in the agreement covered 747 square kilometres (288 sq mi).

Significant natural gas resources were discovered in September 2011 at the Absheron X-2 exploration well drilled by the Heydar Aliyev drilling rig, operated by Maersk Drilling, at a depth of 6,550 metres (21,490 ft).

== Reserves ==
The field is expected to contain 350 billion cubic metres (12 trillion cubic feet) of natural gas and 45 million ton of gas condensate. subsequently boosting Azerbaijan's gas reserves from 2.2 trillion cubic metres (78 trillion cubic feet) to 2.5 trillion cubic metres (88 trillion cubic feet). According to Azerbaijani authorities, the production is likely to begin in 2021–2022. However, the company intends to drill an additional exploration well at a depth of 4,000 metres (13,000 ft) and if the results are positive, the operator will be in position to immediately establish a fixed platform, accelerating production by 5 to 6 years.

== Significance ==
The discovery of vast gas reserves at Absheron field will positively affect the job market in Azerbaijan and significantly boost the Azerbaijani economy. According to experts, Nabucco project may be realized on the basis of Azerbaijani gas alone if this find is exploited properly by Total, which also holds a 10% stake in South Caucasus Pipeline Consortium.

After the selection of Trans-Adriatic Pipeline (TAP) as the main pipeline to deliver natural gas from Azerbaijan to Europe, Absheron field diminished its significance since the capacity of the pipeline will not need additional volumes of gas.

In October 2026, an agreement was signed between Vallourec and TotalEnergies, according to which the French company will supply more than 16 thousand tons of products for the development of the "Absheron" gas field. In addition, the delivery of approximately 159 km of line pipes with anti-corrosion coating for onshore and offshore applications is planned.
