= Cetatea de Baltă gas field =

Natural gas field in Alba County, Romania

Cetatea de Baltă
- Country: Romania
- Region: Alba County
- Offshore/onshore: onshore
- Operator: Romgaz

Field history
- Discovery: 1900
- Start of development: 1900
- Start of production: 1910

Production
- Current production of gas: 1,000×10^{3} m^{3}/d 35×10^{6} cu ft/d 0.36×10^{9} m^{3}/a (13×10^{9} cu ft/a)
- Estimated gas in place: 40×10^{9} m^{3} 1.42×10^{12} cu ft

The Cetatea de Baltă gas field is a natural gas field located in Cetatea de Baltă, Alba County, Romania. Discovered in 1900, it was developed by Romgaz, beginning production of natural gas and condensates in 1910. In 2010, the total proven reserves of the Cetatea de Baltă gas field were around 1.42 trillion ft^{3} (40 km^{3}), with a production rate of around 35 million ft^{3}/day (1×10^{5} m^{3}).

== History ==
The discovery of natural gas in the Transylvanian Basin in 1909 at Sărmașel led to the establishment in 1915 of the Hungarian Gas Company (U.E.G.), with headquarters in Budapest. The company secured concession of the gas fields at Cetatea de Baltă, Șaroș, Bazna, Zau de Câmpie, Sânger, Șincai, Nadeș, and Teleac, in order to exploit and capitalize on those natural gas deposits. The Union of Transylvania with Romania at the end of World War I led to the seizure of the assets of U.E.G., whose majority capital was German. By 1955, the gas field at Cetatea de Baltă was connected to the national distribution network, supplying natural gas to the capital city, Bucharest.

In 2017, the Cetatea de Baltă gas field facilities conducted a training exercise to practice emergency procedures in the event of gas well explosions or fires.

== Underground gas storage ==
In April 2002 Romgaz completed an underground gas storage (UGS) site at the Cetatea de Baltă gas field as a prototype for large-scale natural gas storage. The natural gas extraction and storage processes were initially configured to support 8 wells before being expanded to 14. By 2006, additional UGS sites had been installed in Târgu Mureș and at the gas fields of Sărmășel and Nadeș, with depths ranging from 450 to 1,300 m (1,480 to 4,270 ft).

In 2015, the German multinational electric utility company E.ON signed an 11 million lei contract to store gas at the Cetatea de Baltă facility for one year. In 2018, Romgaz created a new subsidiary to manage the storage of natural gas at six additional UGS sites: Bălăceanca (0.55 TWh), Bilciurești (14.33 TWh), Cetatea de Baltă (0.65 TWh), Ghercești (1.63 TWh), Sărmășel (9.6 TWh), and Urziceni (4.02 TWh).

== See also ==
- List of natural gas fields
- List of natural gas fields in Romania
- Natural gas in Romania
