= Teleac gas field =

Natural gas field in Mureș County, Romania

Teleac
- Country: Romania
- Region: Mureș County
- Offshore/onshore: onshore
- Operator: Romgaz

Field history
- Discovery: 1915
- Start of development: 1915
- Start of production: 1930

Production
- Current production of gas: 670×10^{3} m^{3}/d 23.8×10^{6} cu ft/d 0.24×10^{9} m^{3}/a (8.5×10^{9} cu ft/a)
- Estimated gas in place: 30×10^{9} m^{3} 1.065×10^{12} cu ft

The Teleac gas field is a natural gas field located in Gornești, Mureș County, Romania. Discovered in 1915, it was developed by Romgaz, beginning production of natural gas and condensates in 1930. By 2010 the total proven reserves of the Teleac gas field were around 1.06 trillion ft^{3} (30 km^{3}), with a production rate of around 23.8 million ft^{3}/day (0.67×10^{5} m^{3}).

The gas deposits in Romania have a very long history of exploitation, almost unique at the level of Europe and among the few such old fields that are still in production in the world. A quarter of Romania's natural gas reserves (100 billion m^{3} (3.5 trillion cu ft)) are located in Western Moldavia, Muntenia, and the Black Sea, with the remaining 75% located near methane gas reserve sites in Transylvania. A fifth of these sites are located in the Giurgeu-Brașov Depression and Sibiu County, with the remainder located in Mureș County at sites such as Luduș, Șincai, Bazna, and Nadeș.

While most of the aforementioned Mureș County gas fields have had continuous production with declining reserves for decades, several have had their estimated reserves expanded following the discovery of additional gas, such as at Bogata, Ilimbav, Tăuni, Miercurea Nirajului, and Filitelnic.

The oldest deposits exploited by Romgaz are in Mureș County, where gas has been extracted since 1913. The discovery of natural gas in the Transylvanian Basin in 1909 led to the establishment in 1915 of the Hungarian Gas Company (U.E.G.), with headquarters in Budapest. The company secured concession of the gas fields at Cetatea de Baltă, Șaroș, Bazna, Zau de Câmpie, Sânger, Șincai, Nadeș, and Teleac, in order to exploit and capitalize on those natural gas deposits. The Union of Transylvania with Romania at the end of World War I led to the seizure of the assets of U.E.G., whose majority capital was German.

== See also ==
- List of natural gas fields
- List of natural gas fields in Romania
- Natural gas in Romania
