= Miercurea Nirajului gas field =

Natural gas field in Mureș County, Romania

Miercurea Nirajului
- Country: Romania
- Region: Mureș County
- Offshore/onshore: onshore
- Operator: Romgaz

Field history
- Discovery: 1915
- Start of development: 1915
- Start of production: 1930

Production
- Current production of gas: 1,000×10^{3} m^{3}/d 35×10^{6} cu ft/d 0.36×10^{9} m^{3}/a (13×10^{9} cu ft/a)
- Estimated gas in place: 40×10^{9} m^{3} 1.42×10^{12} cu ft

The Miercurea Nirajului gas field is a natural gas field located in Miercurea Nirajului, Mureș County, Romania. Discovered in 1915, it was developed by Romgaz, beginning production of natural gas and condensates in 1930. By 2010 the total proven reserves of the Miercurea Nirajului gas field were around 1.42 trillion ft^{3} (40 km^{3}), with a production rate of around 35 million ft^{3}/day (1×10^{5} m^{3}).

== History ==
The gas deposits in Romania have a very long history of exploitation, almost unique at the level of Europe and among the few such old fields that are still in production in the world. While most of the aforementioned Mureș County gas fields have had continuous production with declining reserves for decades, several have had their estimated reserves expanded following the discovery of additional gas, such as at Bogata, Ilimbav, Tăuni, Teleac, and Filitelnic.

The oldest deposits exploited by Romgaz are in Mureș County, where gas has been extracted since 1913. In 2008, Romgaz allocated 5.8 million leis for preparatory work, drilling, and production tests at the exploitation well 140 at the Miercurea Nirajului gas field, on a plot near Moșuni village. In November 2021, the Romanian Agency for Mineral Resources announced that the Romgaz lease of the gas field had been extended until December 2027.

== Natural gas in Romania ==
A quarter of Romania's natural gas reserves (100 billion m^{3} (3.5 trillion cu ft)) are located in Western Moldavia, Muntenia, and the Black Sea, with the remaining 75% located near methane gas reserve sites in Transylvania. A fifth of these sites are located in the Giurgeu-Brașov Depression and Sibiu County, with the remainder located in Mureș County at sites such as Luduș, Șincai, Bazna, and Nadeș.

== See also ==
- List of natural gas fields
- List of natural gas fields in Romania
- Natural gas in Romania
