= Zau de Câmpie gas field =

Natural gas field in Mureș County, Romania

Zau de Câmpie
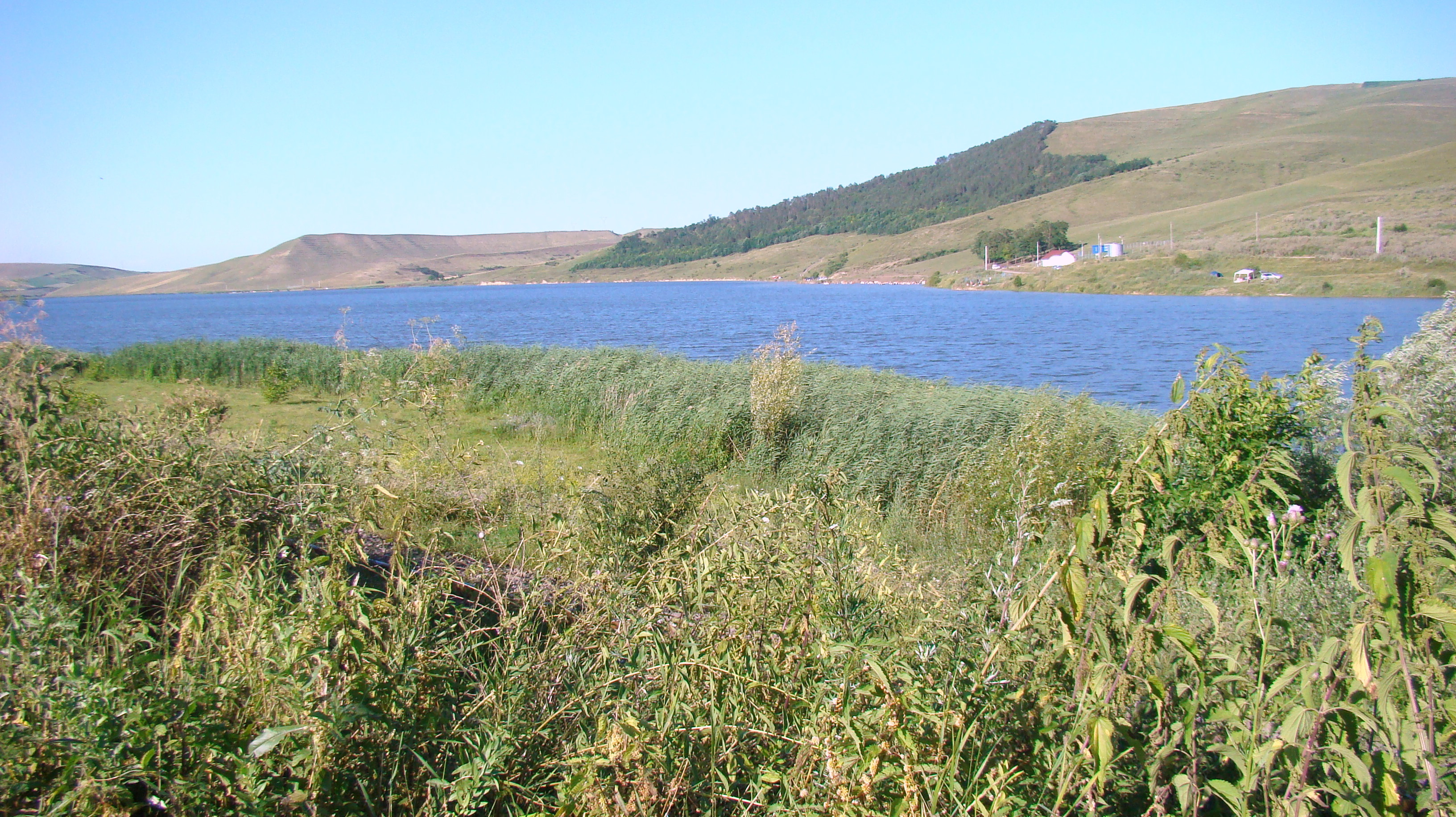
- Zau de Câmpie
- Country: Romania
- Region: Mureș County
- Offshore/onshore: onshore
- Operator: Romgaz

Field history
- Discovery: 1914
- Start of development: 1914
- Start of production: 1920

Production
- Current production of gas: 100×10^{3} m^{3}/d 3.6×10^{6} cu ft/d 0.035×10^{9} m^{3}/a (1.2×10^{9} cu ft/a)
- Estimated gas in place: 2.47×10^{9} m^{3} 87×10^{9} cu ft

The Zau de Câmpie gas field is a natural gas field located in Zau de Câmpie, Mureș County, Romania. It was discovered in 1914, when the first gas extraction fields were created, supplying Târnăveni and Târgu Mureș with natural gas. The Zau de Câmpie gas field was developed by Romgaz, beginning production of natural gas and condensates in 1920. By 2009 the total proven reserves of the Zau de Câmpie gas field were around 416 billion ft^{3} (11.8 billion m^{3}), with a production rate of around 3.6 million cu ft/d (100,000 m^{3}/d) occurring in 2010. By January 2017 62 active drilling rigs were on site, with reduced estimated reserves of 87 billion ft^{3} (2.5×10^{9} m^{3}), slated to be depleted by 2029.

The gas produced at Zau de Câmpie and in the surrounding area is considered to be the purest one; it consists of dry gases, usually made of 99% methane, with the rest being hydrocarbons (ethane, propane, and butane). It currently uses a type C 25.1 Thomassen compressor unit to compress the gas extracted in the field.

== Framework ==
A quarter of Romania's natural gas reserves (100 billion m^{3} (3.5 trillion cu ft)) are located in Western Moldavia, Muntenia, and the Black Sea, with the remaining 75% located near methane gas reserve sites in Transylvania. A fifth of these sites are located in the Giurgeu-Brașov Depression and Sibiu County, with the remainder located in Mureș County at sites such as Luduș, Șincai, Bazna, and Nadeș.

While not rich in natural gas, the Transylvanian Basin is home to Romania's largest methane gas reserves.

In 1970, Romania ranked fourth in the world and second in Europe in the size of its natural gas deposits; by 2016, it ranked third in Europe after the Netherlands and the United Kingdom. The United States Geological Survey's 2000 World Energy assessment ranked the Transylvanian Basin region as the 56th largest in the world (exclusive of the United States), with 0.2% of the world's oil and gas resources, based on volume of reserves plus cumulative production.

== History ==
The gas deposits in Romania have a very long history of exploitation, almost unique at the level of Europe and among the few such old fields that are still in production in the world. The oldest deposits exploited by Romgaz are in Mureș County, where gas has been extracted since 1913. Deposits of methane gas occur in three main areas; the first area is in the northwest and includes the Sărmașel, Zau de Câmpie, and Șincai gas fields. The North Group contains 31 gas fields located to the north of the Mureș River. These are found under the form of dome traps. Representative for this group are the Sărmașel, Grebenișu de Câmpie, Zau de Câmpie, and Țaga gas fields.

The first natural gas deposit in Romania was discovered in 1909, in Sărmașel, about 22 km (14 mi) north of Zau de Câmpie. In 1913, the first production of methane gas was recorded, of 113 m^{3} (4,000 cu ft), from the drilling site at the Sărmașel gas field. That year, the local Greek Catholic priest announced to the Zau de Câmpie community that they will start "to dig for gas, in the form of the one from Sărmașel," on a 2,400 m^{2} (26,000 sq ft) plot of land belonging to the church. Besides Sărmășel and Zau de Câmpie, other gas fields developed in the area were the ones at Deleni, Nadeș, Bazna, and Șincai, followed later by those at Bogata, Ilimbav, Miercurea Nirajului, Tăuni, Teleac, and Filitelnic.

The first geological study of the Zau de Câmpie gas dome (in connection with the classification of mud volcanoes and salt mines in the Transylvanian Plain) was done by Augustin Vancea in his 1929 Ph.D. dissertation. According to a CIA report from 1948 (quoting an article from the communist party organ Scînteia), the Zau de Câmpie gas field was under geological study since 1935, and exploration was begun in 1948, when an important deposit of gas was discovered at a depth of 633 m (2,077 ft). Concomitantly, the Ceanu Mare–Cluj pipeline was being constructed, with the Zau de Câmpie wells due to supply natural gas to the city of Cluj.

In July 2018, the Romanian Agency for Mineral Resources announced that Romgaz's lease of the gas field had been extended until 2027, extended again to 2029 later that year.

== See also ==
- List of natural gas fields
- List of natural gas fields in Romania
- Natural gas in Romania
