= Șaroș gas field =

Natural gas field in Sibiu County, Romania

Șaroș
- Country: Romania
- Region: Sibiu County
- Location: Dumbrăveni
- Offshore/onshore: onshore
- Operator: Romgaz

Field history
- Discovery: 1915
- Start of development: 1915
- Start of production: 1930

Production
- Current production of gas: 2×10^{6} m^{3}/d 70×10^{6} cu ft/d 0.72×10^{9} m^{3}/a (25×10^{9} cu ft/a)
- Estimated gas in place: 80×10^{9} m^{3} 2.84×10^{12} cu ft

The Șaroș gas field is a natural gas field located in Dumbrăveni, Sibiu County, Romania. Discovered in 1915, it was developed by Romgaz, beginning production of natural gas and condensates in 1930. By 2010 the total proven reserves of the Șaroș gas field were around 2.84 trillion ft^{3} (80 km^{3}), with a production rate of around 70 million ft^{3}/day (2×10^{5} m^{3}).

The gas deposits in Romania have a very long history of exploitation, almost unique at the level of Europe and among the few such old fields that are still in production in the world. A quarter of Romania's natural gas reserves (100 billion m^{3} (3.5 trillion cu ft)) are located in Western Moldavia, Muntenia, and the Black Sea, with the remaining 75% located near methane gas reserve sites in Transylvania. A fifth of these sites are located in the Giurgeu-Brașov Depression and Sibiu County, with the remainder located in Mureș County at sites such as Luduș, Șincai, Bazna, and Nadeș.

There are numerous mentions attesting natural gas emanations in the Transylvanian Plateau. The existence of natural gas in Transylvania was known since the 17th century; people in Bazna were often puzzled by "inextinguishable fires". In his 1929 Ph.D. dissertation, geologist Augustin Vancea mentions the unquenchable fires at Șaroș, Bazna, and Copșa Mică.

The oldest deposits exploited by Romgaz are in Mureș County, where gas has been extracted since 1913. In the interwar period, Romania's program of geological works and drilling was amplified, with additional investment poured into extracting gas deposits from Copșa Mică, Bazna, Șaroș, and Șincai. The Transylvanian gas fields occur along the central domes that arose by the folding of the Miocene and Pliocene beds in the Transylvanian Basin. At the Șaroș gas field, the initial rock pressure of the thirteen completed wells ranged from 400 to 715 pounds per square inch, corresponding with a range in depth from 640 to 1,255 feet. The Șaroș gas field was connected by a pipeline with the Noul Săsesc gas field, thus increasing the output of the latter field, which had been heavily tapped out during the winter, due to high consumption. Eventually, the Șaroș gas field was connected to the national network, supplying natural gas to the capital city, Bucharest.

== See also ==
- List of natural gas fields
- List of natural gas fields in Romania
- Natural gas in Romania
