= Copșa Mică gas field =

Natural gas field in Sibiu County, Romania

Copșa Mică
- Country: Romania
- Region: Sibiu County
- Offshore/onshore: onshore
- Operator: Romgaz

Field history
- Discovery: 1915
- Start of development: 1915
- Start of production: 1920

Production
- Current production of gas: 100×10^{3} m^{3}/d 3.7×10^{6} cu ft/d 0.036×10^{9} m^{3}/a (1.3×10^{9} cu ft/a)
- Year of current production of gas: 2010
- Estimated gas in place: 80×10^{9} m^{3} 2.768×10^{12} cu ft

The Copșa Mică gas field is a natural gas field located in Copșa Mică, Sibiu County, Romania. Discovered in 1915, it was developed by Romgaz, beginning production of natural gas and condensates in 1920. Historically, as of 2010, the total proven reserves of the Copșa Mică gas field were estimated at around 2.77 trillion ft^{3} (80 km^{3}), with a production rate of around 3.7 million ft^{3}/day (0.1×10^{5} m^{3}). As a mature field with decades of exploitation, current operational trends for aging natural gas reservoirs in Romania focus on applying rehabilitation concepts to manage advanced stages of reservoir pressure depletion, maximize the recovery factor, and mitigate natural production decline.

== Overview ==
The gas deposits in Romania have a very long history of exploitation, almost unique at the level of Europe and among the few such old fields that are still in production in the world. A quarter of Romania's natural gas reserves (100 billion m^{3} (3.5 trillion cu ft)) are located in Western Moldavia, Muntenia, and the Black Sea, with the remaining 75% located near methane gas reserve sites in Transylvania. A fifth of these sites are located in the Giurgeu-Brașov Depression and Sibiu County, with the remainder located in Mureș County at sites such as Luduș, Șincai, Bazna, and Nadeș.

== History ==
In the interwar period, Romania's program of geological works and drilling was amplified, highlighting the gas deposits from Copșa Mică, Bazna, Șaroș, and Șincai.

On July 13, 1933, the biggest fire in the history of Romania occurred at gas well number 5 in Copșa Mică, with the flames reaching a height of 150 m (490 ft). It took almost 7 years for the authorities to find a way to extinguish the fire, while American specialists were also called upon. In the end, the fire was put out by military forces, who used 4,681 drilling mud wagons and 3,753 water wagons, the equivalent of a 126 km (78 mi) long train set. After the fire was extinguished, there was a work stoppage, due to the opposition of the military authorities to work in the gas zone; this was due to the danger of the fire rekindling and it being easily detectable by enemy aircraft (see Bombing of Romania in World War II). Operations to stop the eruption resumed after 1944 and the gas eruption was finally eliminated in 1947. The eruption and the fire at the Copșa Mică gas field lasted 11 years in all; the gas flow estimated to have been lost through this eruption is equivalent to half of what the whole of Romania consumes in a year.

The 1933 fire at the gas field led to the creation of a carbon black factory at Copșa Mică. The emissions from the Copșa Mică works permeated the area for nearly sixty years, leaving soot on homes, trees, animals, and everything else in the area. For many years, the town was best known for its status as the second most polluted one in Europe after Chernobyl.

== See also ==
- List of natural gas fields
- List of natural gas fields in Romania
- Natural gas in Romania
