= Sărmășel gas field =

Natural gas field in Mureș County, Romania

Sărmășel
- Country: Romania
- Region: Mureș County
- Offshore/onshore: onshore
- Operator: Romgaz

Field history
- Discovery: 1909
- Start of development: 1909
- Start of production: 1912

Production
- Current production of gas: 2×10^{6} m^{3}/d 71×10^{6} cu ft/d 0.71×10^{9} m^{3}/a (25×10^{9} cu ft/a)
- Estimated gas in place: 10×10^{9} m^{3} 354×10^{9} cu ft

The Sărmășel gas field is a natural gas field located in Sărmașu, Mureș County, Romania. Discovered in 1909, it was developed by Romgaz, beginning production of natural gas and condensates in 1912. By 2010, the total proven reserves of the Sărmășel gas field were around 354 billion ft^{3} (10.0 billion m^{3}), with a production rate of around 71 million cu ft/d (2,000,000 m^{3}/d). By 2024, the facility's production capacity more than tripled to 7.5 million m^{3}/d (260 million cu ft/d).

The gas produced at Sărmășel and in the surrounding area is considered to be the purest one; it consists of dry gases, usually made of 99% methane, with the rest being hydrocarbons (ethane, propane, and butane).

== Framework ==
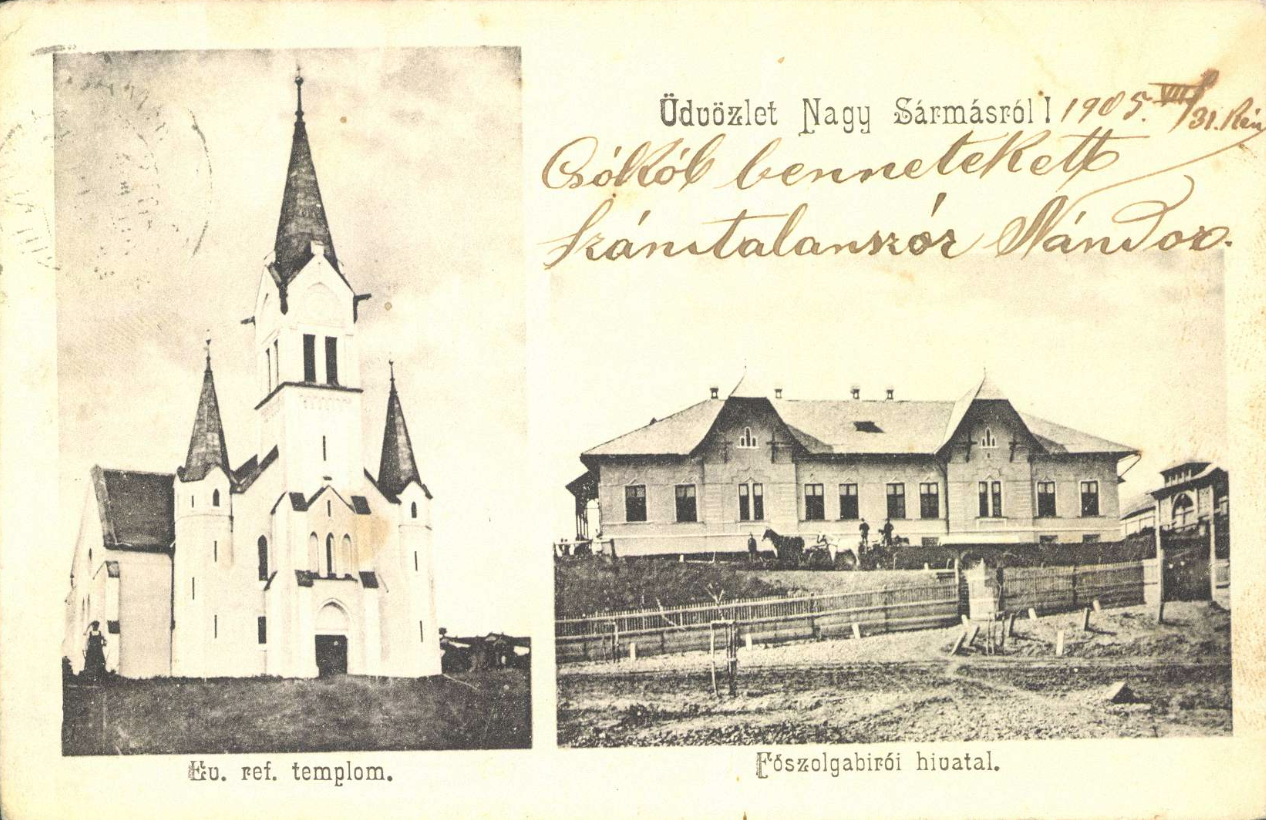
Sărmașu in 1909, the year when the gas well was discovered

A quarter of Romania's natural gas reserves (100 billion m^{3} (3.5 trillion cu ft)) are located in Western Moldavia, Muntenia, and the Black Sea, with the remaining 75% located near methane gas reserve sites in Transylvania. A fifth of these sites are located in the Giurgeu-Brașov Depression and Sibiu County, with the remainder located in Mureș County at sites such as Luduș, Șincai, Bazna, and Nadeș.

While not rich in natural gas, the Transylvanian Basin is home to Romania's largest methane gas reserves.

In 1970, Romania ranked fourth in the world and second in Europe in the size of its natural gas deposits; by 2016, it ranked third in Europe after the Netherlands and the United Kingdom. The United States Geological Survey's 2000 World Energy assessment ranked the Transylvanian Basin region as the 56th largest in the world (exclusive of the United States), with 0.2% of the world's oil and gas resources, based on volume of reserves plus cumulative production.

== History ==
The existence of natural gas in Transylvania was known since the 17th century; for instance, people in Bazna were often puzzled by "inextinguishable fires". The first natural gas deposit in Romania was discovered in 1909, at well 2 in Sărmășel. Originally intended for the extraction of potassium salts, the discovery accessed one of the richest natural gas deposits in the world at that time. The rig itself was probably the first of its kind in Europe; in the place where the gas erupted, craters with "eternal fire" can still be found today.

The gas deposits in Romania have a very long history of exploitation, almost unique at the level of Europe and among the few such old fields that are still in production in the world. The oldest deposits exploited by Romgaz are in Mureș County, where gas has been extracted since 1913. In 1913, the first production of methane gas was recorded here, of 113,000 m^{3} (4,000,000 cu ft). Soon after, the gas output at Sărmășel increased to 900,000 m^{3} (32,000,000 cu ft) per day, making it at the time the 4th most productive gas rig in the world. The Sărmășel gas deposit discovery marks the starting point of the natural gas industry in Romania.

These developments prompted people in nearby villages to also explore for gas deposits. In 1913, the Greek Catholic priest in Zau de Câmpie announced to his flock that they will start "to dig for gas, in the form of the one from Sărmășel," on a 2,400 m^{2} (26,000 sq ft) plot of land belonging to the church; the Zau de Câmpie gas field was discovered the next year.

In 1914 the first gas pipeline was completed, spanning from Sărmășel to Turda to Ocna Mureș, with a length of 55 kilometres (34 miles) and 153 millimetres (6 in) diameter. In 1927, a gas compression station – the first facility of its kind in Europe – was inaugurated at Sărmășel; the station was equipped with 3 Ingersoll Rand horizontal motor compressors.

In 2010, on the occasion of the 100th anniversary of the establishment at Sărmășel of the first commercial natural gas well in Romania, the Natural Gas Museum was inaugurated in Mediaș by Romgaz.

In July 2016, a new compressor station was inaugurated at Sărmășel; the 238 million lei investment will increase storage capacity and the facility's capability to deliver gas at times of peak demand. The Sărmășel underground gas storage facility is a project which aims to increase the existing working capacity at the Sărmășel gas field and is partly financed by the European Union. The upgrade seeks to increase the flexibility of the storage system, improve security of supply, and contribute to North-South gas interconnections in Central and Eastern Europe. The commissioning date is scheduled for December 2025.

== See also ==
- List of natural gas fields
- List of natural gas fields in Romania
- Natural gas in Romania
