= Cobălcescu =

Cobălcescu is a Romanian-language surname that may refer to:

- Grigore Cobălcescu (1831–1892), geologist and paleontologist
  - Cobalescou Island
  - Cobălcescu gas field
  - East Cobălcescu gas field
  - South Cobălcescu gas field
