= Frasin-Gura Humorului gas field =

Natural gas field in Suceava County, Romania

Frasin–Gura Humorului
- Country: Romania
- Region: Suceava County
- Offshore/onshore: onshore
- Operator: Romgaz

Field history
- Discovery: 1971
- Start of development: 1971
- Start of production: 1972

Production
- Estimated gas in place: 1,000×10^{6} m^{3} 36×10^{9} cu ft

The Frasin–Gura Humorului gas field is a natural gas field located in Gura Humorului, Suceava County, Romania. Discovered in 1971, it was developed by Romgaz, beginning production of natural gas and condensates in 1972. By 2010 the total proven reserves of the Frasin–Gura Humorului gas field were around 36 billion ft^{3} (1 km^{3}), with a production rate of around 4.9 million ft^{3}/day (0.14×10^{5} m^{3}). By January 2017, the Frasin–Gura Humorului gas field had a cumulative production of 1,680×10^{6} m^{3} (5.9×10^{10} cu ft) of natural gas and 177×10^{6} m^{3} (6.3×10^{9} cu ft) of condensates, with its proven reserves down to 2,182×10^{6} m^{3} (7.71×10^{10} cu ft) of natural gas and 520×10^{6} m^{3} (1.8×10^{10} cu ft) of condensates, estimated to last until 2029.

== History ==
In December 2010 the gas field was connected by pipeline to the municipality of Câmpulung Moldovenesc at a cost of €6 million.

In 2015, a new gas deposit was discovered at a depth of 4,100 m (13,500 ft) within the perimeter of the Frasin-Gura Humorului gas field. Located in Frasin, the new well contributed alongside a new well at Cargele to a 155% rise in gas condensate production by Romgaz in the first half of 2015.

In 2018, it was revealed that an older well from Frasin—dug in the 1970s and later taken out of use—contaminated the waters of the Moldova River as a result of erosion of the river's left bank. In 2023, it was announced that a new gas well would start production at Frasin within a year.
