= Roman-Secuieni gas field =

Gas field in Neamț County, Romania

Roman-Secuieni
- Country: Romania
- Region: Neamț County
- Offshore/onshore: onshore
- Operator: Romgaz

Field history
- Discovery: 1992
- Start of development: 1992
- Start of production: 1995

Production
- Current production of gas: 2.4×10^{6} m^{3}/d 84×10^{6} cu ft/d 0.85×10^{9} m^{3}/a (30×10^{9} cu ft/a)
- Estimated gas in place: 24×10^{9} m^{3} 850×10^{9} cu ft

The Roman-Secuieni gas field is a natural gas field in Secuieni, Neamț County, Romania lying 10 km (6.2 mi) of Roman and 30 km (19 mi) from Bacău. It was discovered in 1992 and developed by Romgaz. It began production in September 1995 and produces natural gas and condensates. The total proven reserves of the Roman-Secueni gas field are around 850 billion cubic feet (24 km^{3}), and production is slated to increase from 60 million cubic feet/day (1.68×10^{5}m³) in 2007 to 84 million cubic feet/day (2.4×10^{5}m³) in 2010.

The Roman-Secuieni gas field is one of the largest in Romania. With proven reserves of 24 km^{3} (5.8 cu mi) in 2018, it ranked third after the gas fields at Deleni (85 km^{3} (20 cu mi)) and Filitelnic (40 km^{3} (9.6 cu mi)). Roman-Secuieni is also the most important gas field from the Moldavian Platform. The Sarmatian sandstone reservoirs from that region are exclusively gas-bearing (more than 98% methane), the most significant fields being those at Roman-Secuieni, Valea Seacă, Bacău, and Mărgineni. These gas deposits are hosted in combination traps, with a marked lithological character due to frequent vertical and lateral facies variations. At Roman-Secuieni, the gas accumulates in detrital, lens-shaped bodies, grouped into 12 complexes; the deposit is divided into tectonic blocks by sub-vertical faults.

== See also ==
- List of natural gas fields
- List of natural gas fields in Romania
- Natural gas in Romania
