= Poduri gas field =

Natural gas field in Bacău County, Romania

Poduri
- Country: Romania
- Region: Bacău County
- Block: EV-1 Moinești
- Offshore/onshore: onshore
- Operator: Stratum Energy

Field history
- Discovery: 2012
- Start of development: 2012
- Start of production: 2014

Production
- Current production of gas: 1.4×10^{6} m^{3}/d 49×10^{6} cu ft/d 0.5×10^{9} m^{3}/a (18×10^{9} cu ft/a)
- Estimated gas in place: 6.7×10^{9} m^{3} 235×10^{9} cu ft

The Poduri gas field is a natural gas field located in the commune of Poduri in Bacău County, Romania in block EV-1 Moinești. Discovered in 2012, it was developed by Stratum Energy (a privately held natural gas exploration and production company based in Houston, Texas), determining it to have initial total proven reserves of around 235 billion ft^{3} (6.7 km^{3}) across seven sub-fields. It began production of natural gas and condensates in 2014, with a production rate of around 49 million ft^{3}/day (1.4×105 m^{3}).

By October, the Poduri 1 and Poduri 2 wells were producing 100 m^{3}/d (3,500 cu ft/d) of condensate and light crude oil and 450,000 m^{3}/d (16,000,000 cu ft/d) of natural gas, the latter extracted into Romania's national distribution system via a 4×10^{6} m^{3}/d (1.4×10^{8} cu ft/d) capacity pipeline. Additional production was being forecasted with the drilling of the Poduri 3 well along with plans to drill nine additional wells. Nevertheless, the mayor of Poduri, Gheorghe Iscu, was dissatisfied with the number of jobs and amount of new infrastructure created as a result of the gas field. With an investment of US$150 million in the Poduri gas field in 2015, Stratum Energy was poised to become the third-largest natural gas producer in Romania, trailing only Romgaz and Petrom in production volume.

As of 2023, the Poduri conventional gas field has recovered 42.02% of its total recoverable reserves, with peak production in 2015. The field currently accounts for approximately 2% of Romania’s daily output. Based on economic projections, production will continue until 2104.

== See also ==
- List of natural gas fields
- List of natural gas fields in Romania
- Natural gas in Romania
