= Șincai gas field =

Gas field in Mureș County, Romania

Șincai
- Country: Romania
- Region: Mureș County
- Offshore/onshore: onshore
- Operator: Romgaz

Field history
- Discovery: 1915
- Start of development: 1915
- Start of production: 1930

Production
- Current production of gas: 500×10^{3} m^{3}/d 17.5×10^{6} cu ft/d 0.18×10^{9} m^{3}/a (6.4×10^{9} cu ft/a)
- Estimated gas in place: 10×10^{9} m^{3} 355×10^{9} cu ft

The Șincai gas field is a natural gas field located in Șincai, Mureș County, Romania. Discovered in 1915, it was developed by Romgaz, beginning production of natural gas and condensates in 1930. By 2010 the total proven reserves of the Șincai gas field were around 355 billion ft^{3} (10 km^{3}), with a production rate of around 17.5 million ft^{3}/day (0.5×10^{5} m^{3}).

== History ==
The gas deposits in Romania have a very long history of exploitation, almost unique at the level of Europe and among the few such old fields that are still in production in the world. The oldest deposits exploited by Romgaz are in Mureș County, where natural gas has been extracted since 1913. Deposits of methane gas occur in three main areas; the first area is in the northwest and includes the Sărmașel, Zau de Câmpie, and Șincai gas fields.

The first natural gas deposit in Romania was discovered in 1909, in Sărmașel, about 24 km (15 mi) northwest of Șincai. In 1913, the first production of methane gas was recorded at Sărmașel, of 113×10^{3} m^{3} (4.0×10^{6} cu ft). The discovery of natural gas in the Transylvanian Basin in 1909 led to the establishment in 1915 of the Hungarian Gas Company (U.E.G.), with headquarters in Budapest. The company secured concession of the gas fields at Cetatea de Baltă, Șaroș, Bazna, Zau de Câmpie, Sânger, Șincai, Nadeș, and Teleac, in order to exploit and capitalize on those natural gas deposits. The Union of Transylvania with Romania at the end of World War I led to the seizure of the assets of U.E.G., whose majority capital was German. In the interwar period, Romania's program of geological works and drilling was amplified, highlighting the gas deposits from Copșa Mică, Bazna, Șaroș, and Șincai.

== See also ==
- List of natural gas fields
- List of natural gas fields in Romania
- Natural gas in Romania
