= Târnăveni gas field =

Natural gas field in Mureș County, Romania

Târnăveni
- Country: Romania
- Region: Mureș County
- Offshore/onshore: onshore
- Operator: Romgaz

Field history
- Discovery: 1950
- Start of production: 1955

Production
- Current production of gas: 1.55×10^{6} m^{3}/d 55×10^{6} cu ft/d 0.55×10^{9} m^{3}/a (19×10^{9} cu ft/a)
- Estimated gas in place: 12×10^{9} m^{3} 418×10^{9} cu ft

The Târnăveni gas field natural gas field is located near the city of Târnăveni in Mureș County, Romania. Discovered in 1950, it was developed by Romgaz, beginning production of natural gas and condensates in 1955. By 2010 the total proven reserves of the Târnăveni gas field were around 418 billion ft^{3} (12 km^{3}), with a production rate of around 55 million ft^{3}/day (1.55×10^{5} m^{3}).

The first derrick used to extract gas at Târnăveni was located in the village of Botorca, today a part of Târnăveni. In 1922, hydrogen was produced for the first time in Romania at the Târnăveni Nitrogen Plant as a byproduct of water and natural gas. By 1950 it was the oldest and largest chemical plant in Romania, using natural gas from the Târnăveni gas field as its primary source of energy. Aside from domestic usage, gas from Târnăveni was also exported to other members of the Warsaw Pact during the early stages of the Cold War, initially to the Soviet Union via a pipeline to Kiev in 1950 and subsequently to Hungary in 1959.

== See also ==
- List of natural gas fields
- List of natural gas fields in Romania
- Natural gas in Romania
