= List of natural gas fields in Romania =

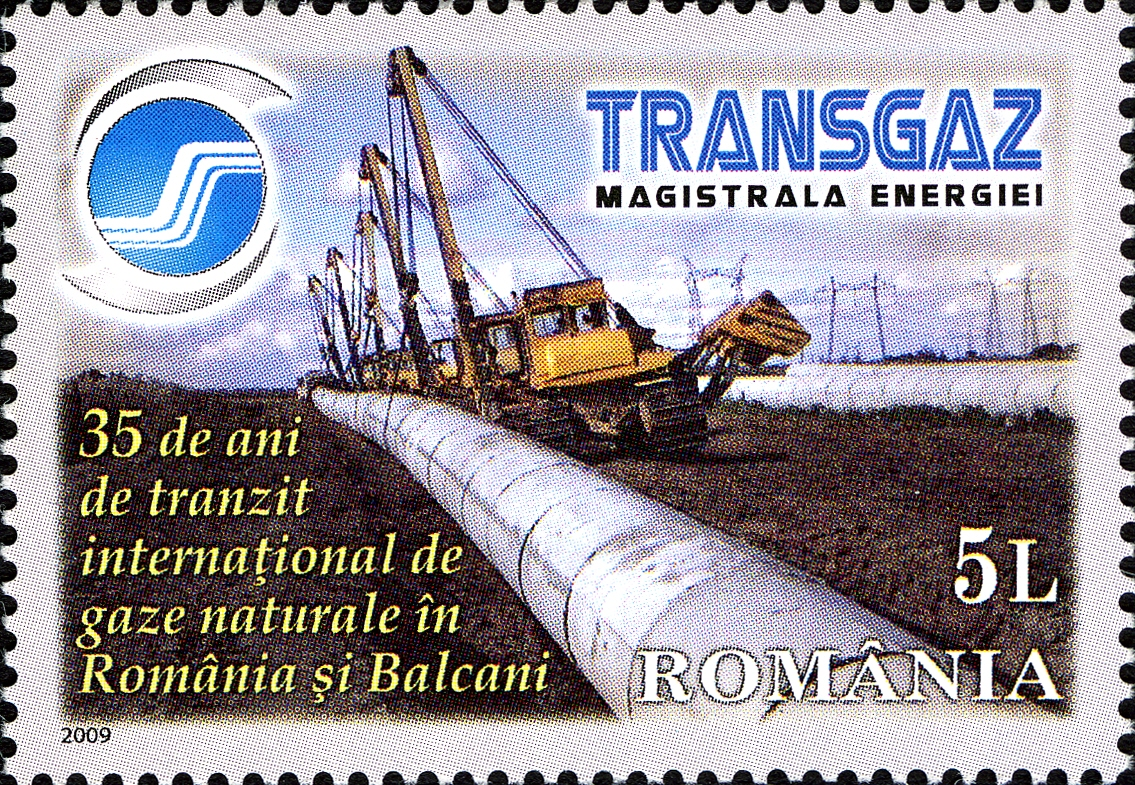
Gas pipeline construction - Romanian stamp

This is a list of natural gas fields in Romania.

== Onshore fields ==
Field name	Location	Discovery	Begin of production	Operator	Proven reserves	Daily Production	Other notes	References
Bazna	Bazna, Sibiu County	1912	1915	Romgaz	1.05 Tcf	23.8 Mcf		
Bătrânești	Icușești, Neamț County	2008	2008	Romgaz	53 Bcf	7 Mcf		
Bențid	Șimonești, Harghita County	1964	1966	Romgaz	100 Bcf	30 Mcf		
Berbinceni	Secuieni	2008	2008	Romgaz	53 Bcf	7 Mcf		
Bilca	Bilca, Suceava County	2000	2006	Raffles Energy + Romgaz	107 Bcf (2010)	3.7 Mcf (2010)		
Bilciurești	Bilciurești, Dâmbovița County	1962	1962	Romgaz	100 Bcf (2010)	4.9 Mcf (2010)		
Bobocu	Cochirleanca, Buzău County	1966	1966	Zeta Petroleum	147 Bcf (2011)	25 Mcf/d (2011)	first developed by Romgaz, but abandoned in 1995 due to sand influx, taken over by Zeta Petroleum in 1998, production restarted 2011	
Brădești	Brădești, Harghita County	1965	1966	Romgaz	74 Bcf	20 Mcf		
Brodina	Brodina, Suceava County	2009	2010	Romgaz, Aurelian Oil & Gas	99 Bcf (2010)	5.3 Mcf (2010)		
Caragele	Luciu, Buzău County	June 2016	2020	Romgaz	986 Bcf (2016)	12.76 Mcf per well (2020)	one of the largest recent onshore discoveries, with a length of 35 km (22 mi) located at a depth of 4,000 m (13,000 ft) in Jurassic calcareous reservoirs	
Călinești	Călinești, Teleorman County	2010	2014	Carpathian Energy	63 Bcf (2013)	10 Mcf (2013)		
Cetatea de Baltă	Cetatea de Baltă, Alba County	1900	1910	Romgaz	1.42 Tcf (2010)	42 Mcf (2010)		
Copșa Mică	Copșa Mică, Sibiu County	1915	1920	Romgaz	2.77 Tcf (2010)	3.7 Mcf (2010)		
Cristur	Cristuru Secuiesc, Harghita County	1920	1930	Romgaz	852 Bcf (2010)	52.5 Mcf (2010)		
Cușmed	Atid, Harghita County	1967	1968	Romgaz	75 Bcf (1995)	20 Mcf (1995)		
Daia	Apold, Mureș County	1915	1930	Romgaz	2.13 Tcf (2010)	130 Mcf (2010)		
Damieni	Eremitu, Mureș County	1972	1972	Romgaz	39 Bcf (2010)	4.9 Mcf (2010)		
Dârvari	Dârvari, Mehedinți County	2012	2015	Sterling Resources	148 Bcf (2013)	11 Mcf (2013)	Unconventional: shale gas	
Deleni	Băgaciu, Mureș County	1912	1915	Romgaz	3 Tcf (1999)	178 Mcf (1999)		
Filitelnic	Bălăușeri, Mureș County	1958	1961	Romgaz	2.1 Bcf (2010)	107 Mcf (2010)		
Firtușu	Lupeni, Harghita County	1966	1970	Romgaz	100 Bcf (1995)	30 Mcf (1995)		
Gherăiești	Bacău, Bacău County	2009	2010	Aurelian Oil & Gas	52 Bcf (2010)	3.52 Mcf (2010)		
Frasin-Gura Humorului	Gura Humorului, Suceava County	1971	1972	Romgaz	36 Bcf (2010)	5 Mcf (2010)		
Ghercești	Ghercești, Dolj County	1970	1975	Romgaz	400 Bcf (1995)	100 Mcf (1995)	Romgaz also operates a large gas storage facility at this site.	
Ghindăoani	Ghindăoani, Neamț County	2000	2006	Aurelian Oil & Gas	115 Bcf (2010)	4 Mcf (2010)		
Grădiștea	Grădiștea, Vâlcea County	2002	2007	Romgaz	170 Bcf (2007)	30 Mcf (2007)		
Ibănești	Ibănești, Mureș County	1965	1966	Romgaz	61 Bcf (1991)	20 Mcf (1991)		
Ilimbav	Marpod, Sibiu County	1932	1935	Romgaz	532 Bcf (2010)	12 Mcf (2010)		
Laslău Mare	Suplac, Mureș County	1920	1975	Romgaz	176 Bcf (2000)	21.3 Mcf (2008)		
Lilieci	Hemeiuș, Bacău County	2009	2010	Aurelian Oil & Gas	147 Bcf (2010)	4.6 Mcf (2010)		
Mamu	Mădulari, Vâlcea County	1980	1988	Petrom	276 Bcf (2007)	84 Mcf (2007)		
Mănești-Vlădeni	Mănești	1943	1945	Petrom	52 Bcf (2008)	4.6 Mcf (2008)		
Miercurea Nirajului	Miercurea Nirajului, Mureș County	1915	1930	Romgaz	1.42 Tcf (2010)	35 Mcf (2010)		
Mușenița	Mușenița, Suceava County	2012	2014	Zeta Petroleum	80 Bcf (2014)	37 Mcf (2014)		
Nades	Nadeș, Mureș County	1915	1930	Romgaz	355 Bcf (2009)	17.5 Mcf (2009)		
Noul Săsesc	Laslea, Sibiu County	1920	1925	Romgaz	3.55 Tcf (2009)	70 Mcf (2009)		
Plenița	Plenița, Dolj County	2012	2015	Sterling Resources	124 Bcf (2013)	11 Mcf (2013)	Unconventional production: shale gas	
Poduri	Poduri, Bacău County	2012	2014	Stratum Energy	235 Bcf (2014)	49 Mcf (2014)		
RBN-4	Bârlad, Vaslui County	2008	2008	Romgaz	53 Bcf (2010)	3.74 Mcf (2010)		
Roman-Secuieni	Secuieni, Neamț County	1992	1995	Romgaz	850 Bcf (2009)	84 Mcf (2009)		
Rodbav	Șoarș, Brașov County	1935	1938	Romgaz	213 Bcf (2010)	10 Mcf (2010)		
Roua	Fântânele, Mureș County	1915	1930	Romgaz	1.6 Tcf (2010)	23.8 Mcf (2010)		
Salonta	Salonta, Bihor County	2010	2010	Expert Petroleum	230 Bcf (2010)	54.5 Mcf (2010)		
Sărmașel	Sărmașu, Mureș County	1909	1912	Romgaz	354 Bcf (2010)	71 Mcf (2010)		
Sângeorgiu de Pădure	Sângeorgiu de Pădure, Mureș County	1920	1925	Romgaz	871 Bcf (2010)	55 Mcf (2010)		
Sighișoara	Sighişoara, Mureș County	2003	2004	Romgaz, Wintershall	196 Bcf (2004)	10.6 Mcf (2004)		
Solca	Solca, Suceava County	2010	2012	Europa Oil & Gas	80 Bcf (2012)	106 Mcf (2012)		
Spinoasa	Săcuieu, Cluj County	1980	1985	Romgaz	1.045 Tcf (2013)	100 Mcf (2013)		
Șamșud	Șamșud, Sălaj County	1915	1920	Romgaz	52 Bcf (2010)	53 Mcf (2010)		
Șaroș	Dumbrăveni, Sibiu County	1915	1930	Romgaz	2.84 Tcf (2010)	70 Mcf (2010)		
Șincai	Nadeș, Mureș County	1915	1930	Romgaz	355 Bcf (2010)	17.5 Mcf (2010)		
Suceava	Suceava, County			H2Oil + Raffles				
Târgu Mureș	Târgu Mureș, Mureș County	1920	1925	Romgaz	697 Bcf (2010)	55 Mcf (2010)		
Târnăveni	Târnăveni, Mureș County	1950	1955	Romgaz	418 Bcf (2010)	55 Mcf (2010)		
Teleac	Gornești, Mureș County	1915	1930	Romgaz	1.06 Tcf (2010)	23.8 Mcf (2020)		
Torcești	Adjud, Vrancea County	2007	2008	Petrom	52 Bcf (2008)	4.8 Mcf (2008)		
Totea	Licurici, Gorj County	2011	2011	Petrom	360 Bcf (2011)	16.9 Mcf (2011)		
Voitinel	Solca, Suceava County	2010	2012	Aurelian Oil & Gas; Europa Oil & Gas; Romgaz	415 Bcf (2010)	106 Mcf (2010)		
Zau de Câmpie	Zau de Câmpie, Mureș County	1914	1920	Romgaz	416 Bcf (2009)	3.6 Mcf (2010)	62 active drilling rigs as of 2018	

== Offshore fields ==
Field name	Location	Discovery	Begin of production	Operator	Proven reserves	Production per day	Other notes	References
A-E	Black Sea - Midia Block	2010	2015	Sterling Resources	43 Bcf	11 Mcf		
Ana	Black Sea - Midia Block	2010	2010	Sterling Resources	247 Bcf	110 Mcf		
Anca	Black Sea - Midia Block	2010	2018	Sterling Resources	442 Bcf	88 Mcf		
Balaur	Black Sea	2010	2015	Sterling Resources	125 Bcf	22 Mcf		
Bianca	Black Sea	2010	2015	Sterling Resources	114 Bcf (2015)	22 Mcf (2015)		
Clara	Black Sea	2010	2015	Sterling Resources	97 Bcf (2015)	11 Mcf (2015)		
Cobălcescu	Black Sea	2000	2002	Petrom	70 Bcf (2013)	30 Mcf (2013)		
Doina	Black Sea	1990	1995	Petrom	200 Bcf (2008)	17.7 Mcf (2008)		
Domino	Black Sea	2012	2020	Petrom, ExxonMobil	1.46 Tcf (2020)	630 Mcf (2020)		
East Cobălcescu	Black Sea	2013	2018	PetroCeltic	491 Bcf (2018)	200 Mcf (2018)		
Florina	Black Sea	2010	2015	Sterling Resources	77 Bcf (2015)	11 Mcf (2015)		
Gina	Black Sea	2010	2015	Sterling Resources	88 Bcf (2015)	22 Mcf (2015)		
Ioana	Black Sea	2010	2015	Sterling Resources	653 Bcf (2015)	110 Mcf (2015)		
Lira	Black Sea	2016	not yet started	Lukoil	1.1 Tcf (2016)	not yet started		
Luceafărul	Black Sea	2013	2018	Sterling Resources	104 Bcf (2018)	50 Mcf (2018)		
Maria	Black Sea - Midia Block	2010	2018	Sterling Resources	102 Bcf (2018)	22 Mcf (2018)		
Miorița	Black Sea - Midia Block	2010	2015	Sterling Resources	125 Bcf (2015)	22 Mcf (2015)		
Muridava	Black Sea - Block EX27	2011	not started	Melrose Resources	169 Bcf (2011)	up to 100 Mcf/d		
Nadia	Black Sea - Midia Block	2013	2018	Sterling Resources	306 Bcf (2018)	50 Mcf (2018)		
Paula	Black Sea	2013	2018	Sterling Resources	58 Bcf (2012)	5 Mcf (2012)		
Pelican South	Black Sea - Neptun Deep	2014	not yet started	OMV, ExxonMobil	700-900 Bcf (2015)	200 Mcf		
South Cobălcescu	Black Sea	2012	2018	PetroCeltic	404 Bcf (2014)	202 Mcf (2014)		
