= Neptun Deep =

Romanian offshore gas project

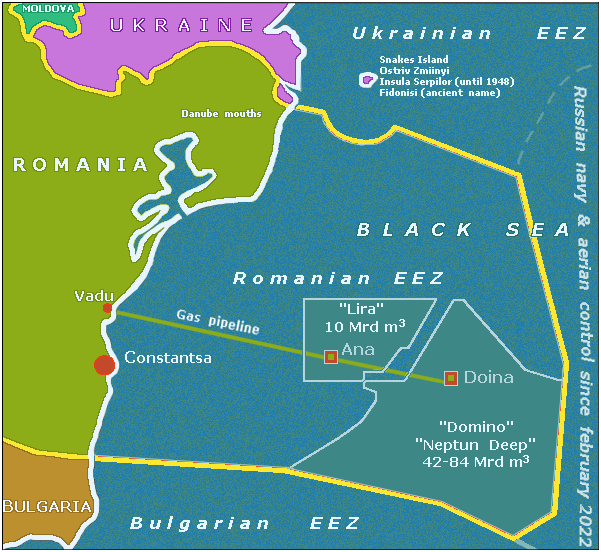
- Map of the Neptun Deep project
- Country: Romania
- Region: Black Sea
- Location: Neptun
- Block: XIX Neptun
- Offshore/onshore: Offshore
- Coordinates: 44.044°N 30.58°E
- Operators: Romgaz, Petrom

Field history
- Discovery: 2011
- Start of development: 2023

Production
- Recoverable gas: 100×10^{9} m^{3} (3.5×10^{12} cu ft)

Neptun Deep is an offshore gas project located around 160 km (99 mi; 86 nmi) off the Romanian coast and covering an area of 7,500 km^{2} (2,900 sq mi) in 100–1,000 m (330–3,280 ft) deep water. The project is carried out by the Austrian-owned OMV Petrom and the Romanian company Romgaz, each owning a 50% share. The development of the gas field started in 2023 for an estimated €4 billion, and production will begin in 2027.

Expected to yield 8 billion cubic metres of natural gas per year, Neptun Deep is the largest offshore natural gas project under development in the European Union and will nearly double Romania's gas output. As a net exporter amid the EU efforts to reduce the reliance on Russian natural gas, Romanian gas will also be supplied to Germany and Moldova, as well as other European countries such as Hungary and Slovakia.

== Infrastructure ==
Neptun Deep will develop the Domino and Pelican South fields, which in turn will be connected to a shallow-water unmanned offshore platform. The Domino field will exploit through six gas wells connected to two subsea drill centres and in turn tied to the unmanned platform through 36.5 km (22.7 mi) umbilical flowlines. The Pelican South field will have four gas wells connected to one subsea drill centre, which will then be tied to the platform through a 1.6 km (0.99 mi) electrically heated flexible flowline.

Drilling of the wells started in 2025 and is carried out by the Transocean Barents semi-submersible drilling rig.

The project also includes a 90 m (300 ft) custom-built offshore support vessel, constructed in Poland with final outfitting done in Norway. The ship is designed to carry 90 people and transport supplies for base technicians, while also featuring an offshore crane for supporting operations at sea. The multihull vessel was launched in March 2026 at the Montex shipyard in Gdańsk and is undergoing outfitting at Green Yard Kleven. She was christened Elisa in honor of Elisa Leonida Zamfirescu, the first Romanian female engineer.

=== Neptun Alpha platform ===
The Neptun Alpha is an unmanned platform operated remotely via a digital twin. Neptun Alpha was built by Saipem at its shipyards: the jacket at the Arbatax shipyard in Italy and the 9,000 t (8,900 long tons; 9,900 short tons) topsides at the Karimun shipyard in Indonesia. The platform weighs a total of 16,500 t (16,200 long tons; 18,200 short tons) and has a height of over 225 m (738 ft). In 2026, it was placed in 120 m (390 ft) deep water with the help of the Saipem 7000 semi-submersible crane vessel.

The platform will then be connected to the shore through a 160 km (99 mi) long, 760 mm (30 in) in diameter pipeline and associated optical fiber cable. Installation of the pipeline is carried out by Saipem's Castorone pipe-laying ship for the deep-water segment and the Castoro 10 for the near-shore segment. The pipe segment on the Romanian shore is installed through a tunnel under the beach and reaches Tuzla, where the gas metering station will be located. Once onshore, the natural gas will be delivered to the Romanian gas transmission system after measuring and preparation.

== Incidents ==
On 11 August, two Russian Gerbera drones were found floating near the Neptun Deep platform. The two drones, along with a drone wing, were safely disposed of by EOD divers of the Romanian Naval Forces.

On 20 August, a Russian unmanned surface vehicle containing explosives was discovered drifting close to Neptun Alpha. Two Romanian Air Force F-16s were dispatched in response, and the drone was subsequently destroyed by one of the fighters with its 20 mm onboard cannon. A team of EOD divers brought in by a Coast Guard vessel destroyed the rest of the drone remains.

== See also ==
- List of natural gas fields in Romania
