= Dumbrăveni =

- Town
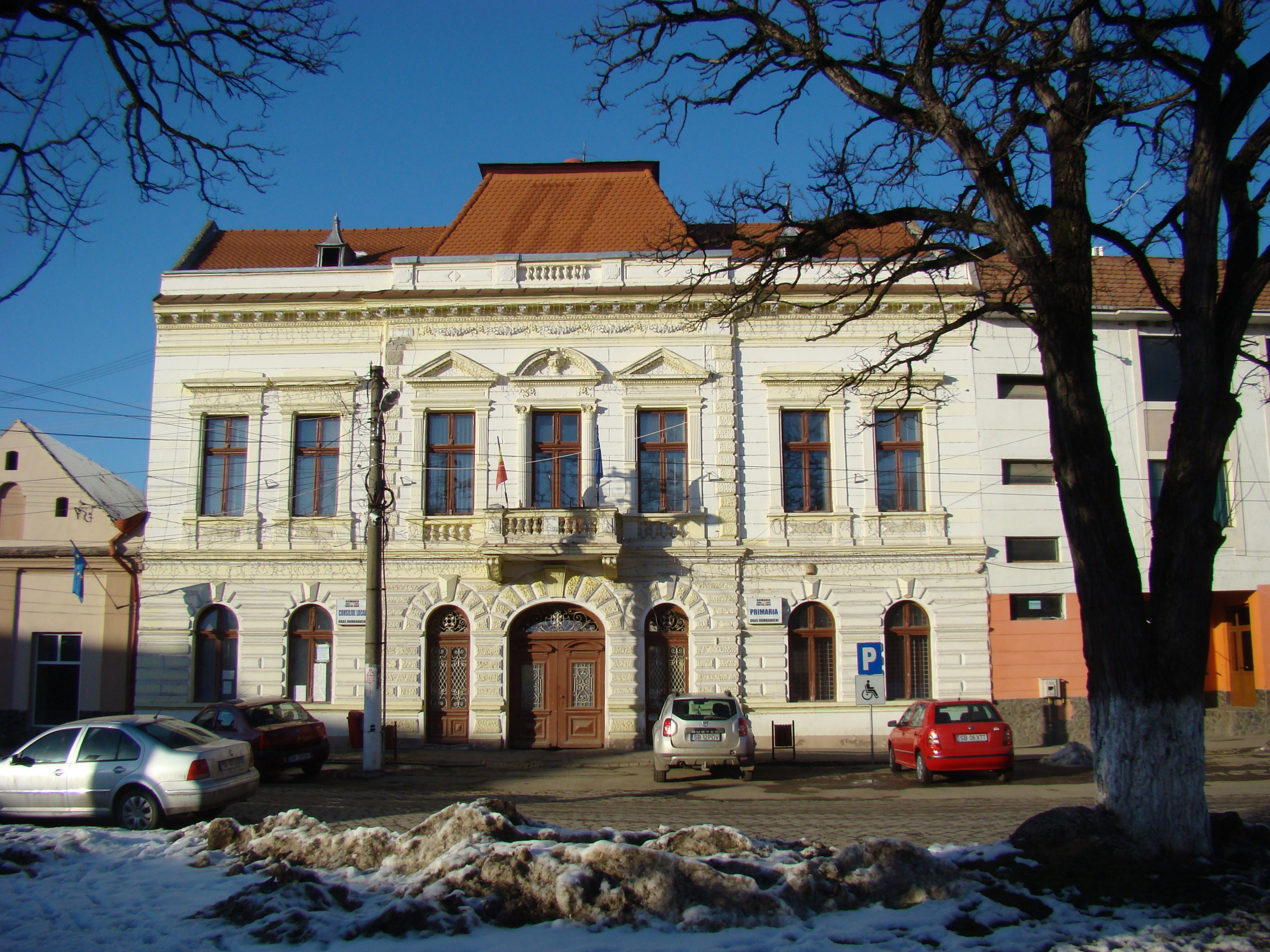
- Dumbrăveni Townhall

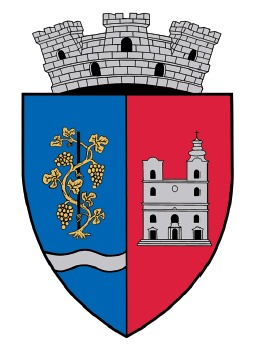
- Coat of arms

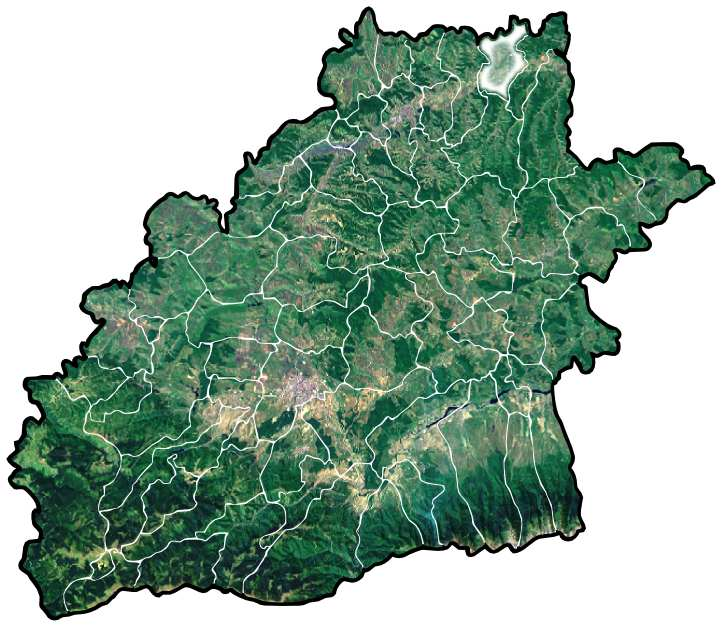
- Location in Sibiu County

- Location in Romania
- Coordinates: 46°13′39″N 24°34′33″E
- Country: Romania
- County: Sibiu

Government
  - Mayor (2024–2028): Emil Dârloșan (PSD)
- Area: 55.75 km^{2} (21.53 sq mi)
- Elevation: 495 m (1,624 ft)
- Highest elevation: 600 m (2,000 ft)
- Lowest elevation: 340 m (1,120 ft)
- Population (2021-12-01): 6,238
  - Density: 111.9/km^{2} (289.8/sq mi)
- Time zone: UTC+02:00 (EET)
  - Summer (DST): UTC+03:00 (EEST)
- Postal code: 555500
- Area code: +(40) 0269
- Vehicle reg.: SB
- Website: www.primariadumbraveni.ro

Dumbrăveni (before 1945 Ibașfalău; German: Elisabethstadt; Saxon dialect: Eppeschdorf; Hungarian: Erzsébetváros) is a town in the north of Sibiu County, in the centre of Transylvania, central Romania. The town administers two villages, Ernea (Ehrgang; Argung; Szászernye) and Șaroș pe Târnave (Scharosch an der Kokel; Šuerš; Szászsáros).

== Geography ==
Dumbrăveni lies on the banks of the river Târnava Mare, 20 km (12 mi) east from the city of Mediaș, the second largest city in the county, and 77 km (48 mi) northeast of Sibiu, the county seat. It is situated on the Transylvanian Plateau, on the border with Mureș County, midway between Mediaș and Sighișoara.

The town is crossed on its southern edge by National Road DN14, which connects Sibiu to Sighișoara. There is also a train station that serves Line 300 of the CFR network, which connects Bucharest with the Hungarian border near Oradea.

The Șaroș gas field is located on the territory of Dumbrăveni.

== Demographics ==
Historical population
Year	Pop.	±%
1910	4,408	—
1930	4,067	−7.7%
1948	4,562	+12.2%
1956	5,367	+17.6%
1966	8,452	+57.5%
1977	9,883	+16.9%
1992	9,354	−5.4%
2002	8,419	−10.0%
2011	7,388	−12.2%
2021	6,238	−15.6%
Source: Census data

According to the 2011 census, the town had 7,388 inhabitants; 71.1% of those were Romanians, 18.4% Roma, 9.2% Hungarians, and 1% Germans (more specifically Transylvanian Saxons). At the 2021 census, Dumbrăveni had a population of 6,238; of those, 56.54% were Romanians, 23.32% Roma, and 5.69% Hungarians.

For Armenian Catholics, see Ordinariate for Armenian Catholics of Romania.

== Natives ==
- Virgil Atanasiu (born 1937), sports shooter
- Árpád Szabó (1878–1948), Hungarian politician

== Education ==
There are two secondary schools in this town: the Dumbrăveni Theoretical High School and the Timotei Cipariu High School.

== See also ==
- Apafi Castle
- Armenian Catholic church of Dumbrăveni
- Dumbrăveni Prison
- Fortified church of Șaroș pe Târnave
- Roman Catholic church of Dumbrăveni

== Gallery ==
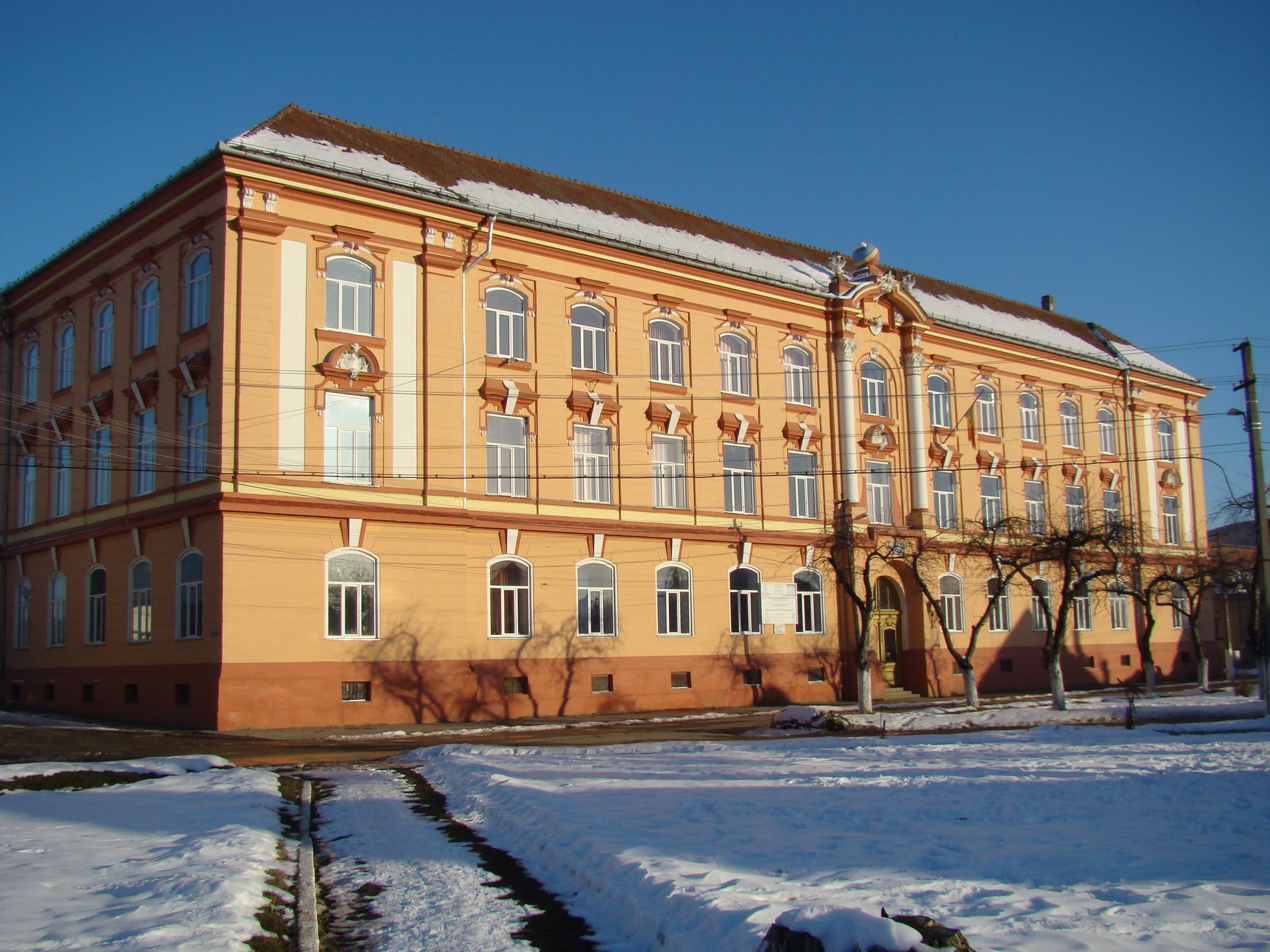
Timotei Cipariu High School in Dumbrăveni

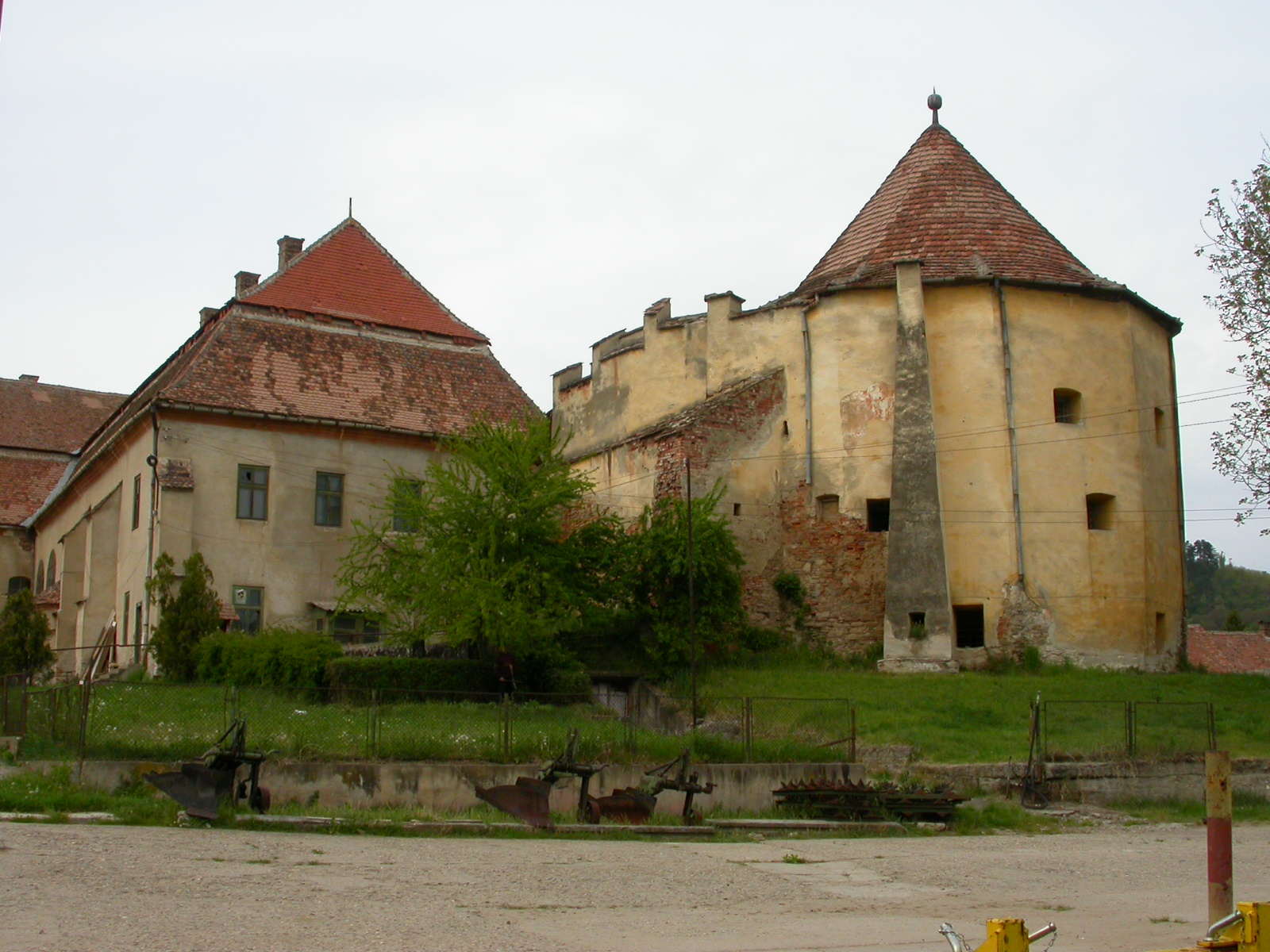
Apafi Castle

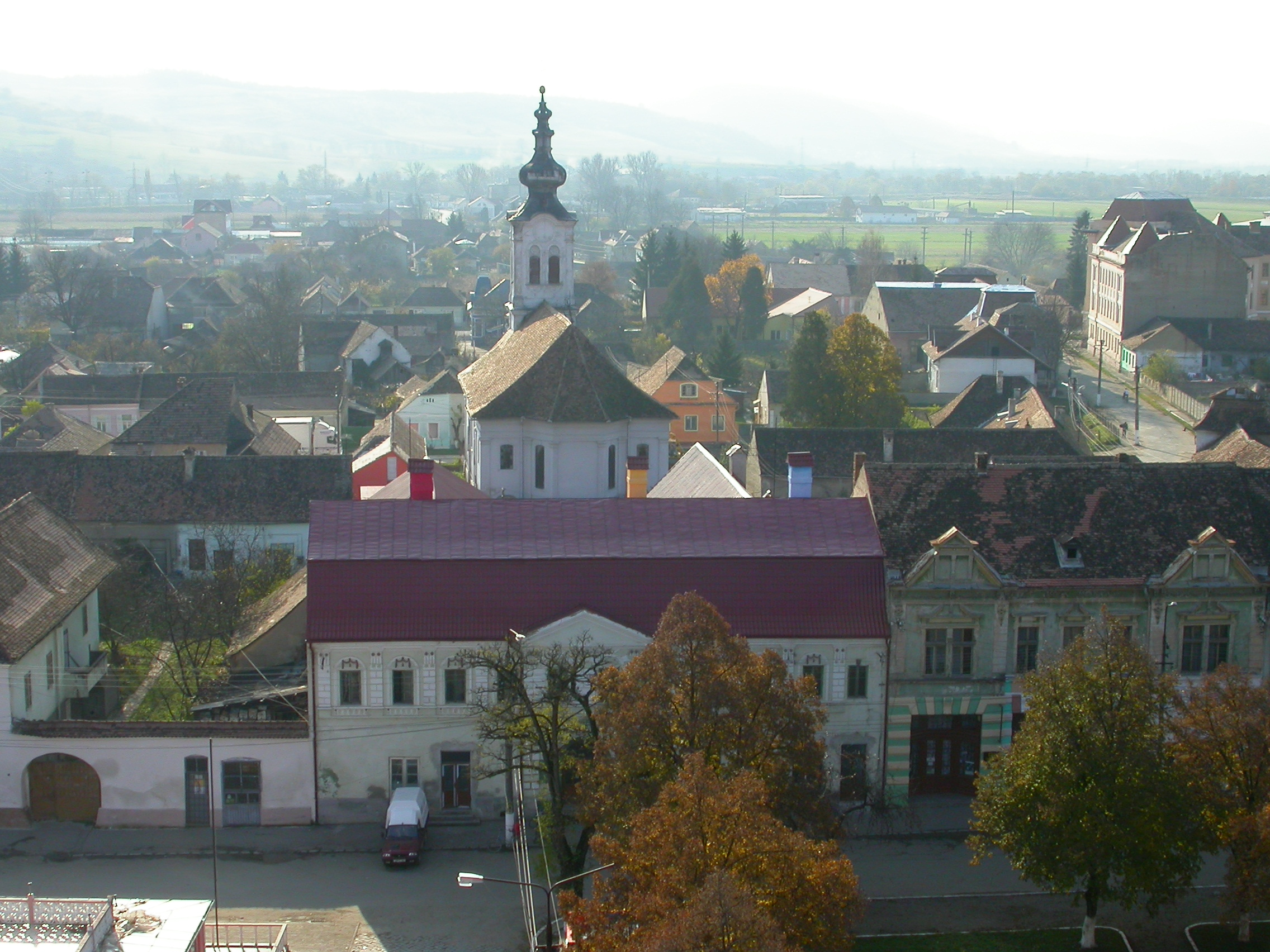
Roman Catholic church

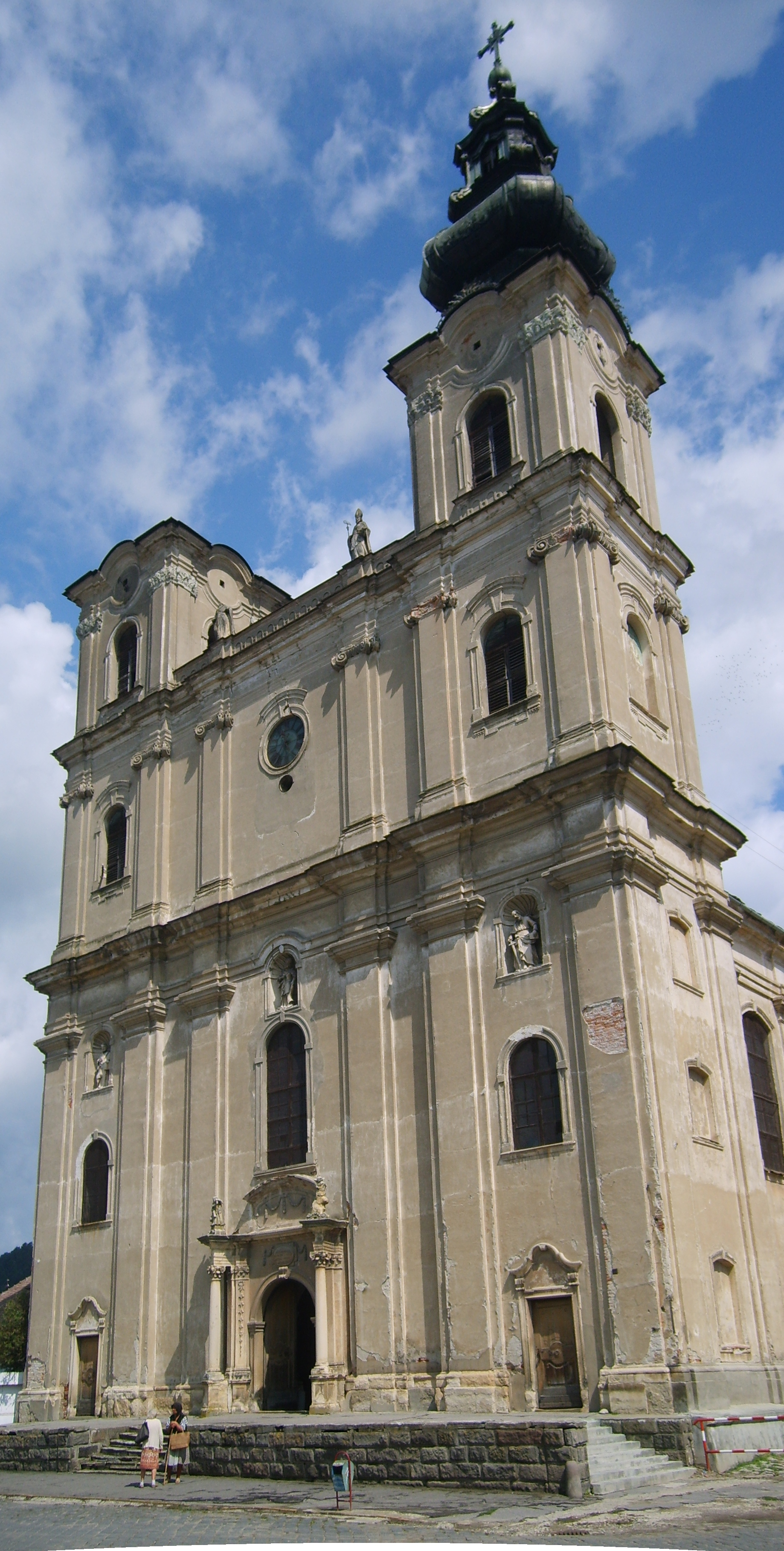
Armenian Catholic church in the main square of Dumbrăveni

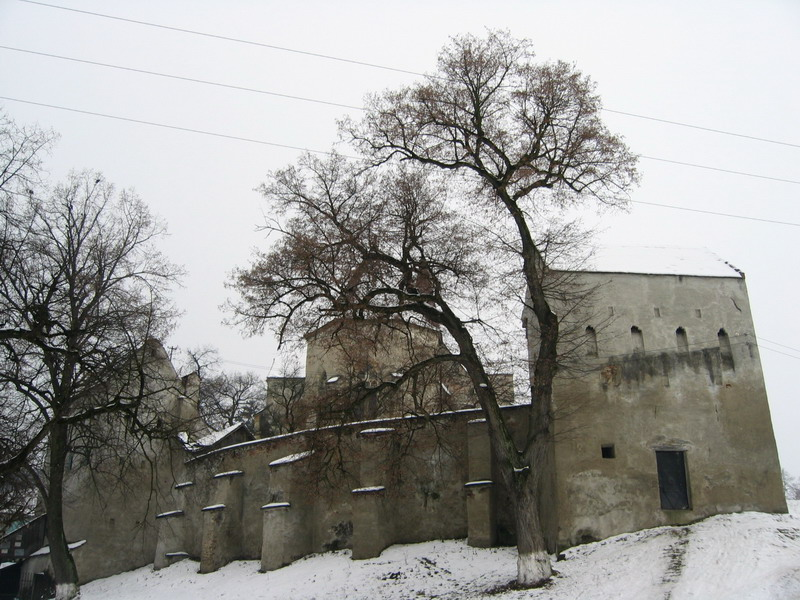
Fortified church of Șaroș pe Târnave village

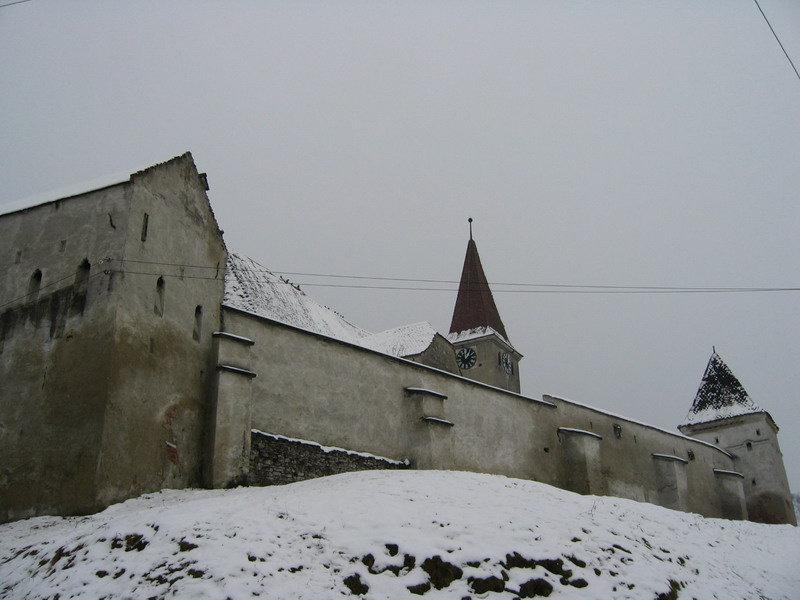
Medieval Evangelical Lutheran Transylvanian Saxon fortified church of Șaroș pe Târnave in winter

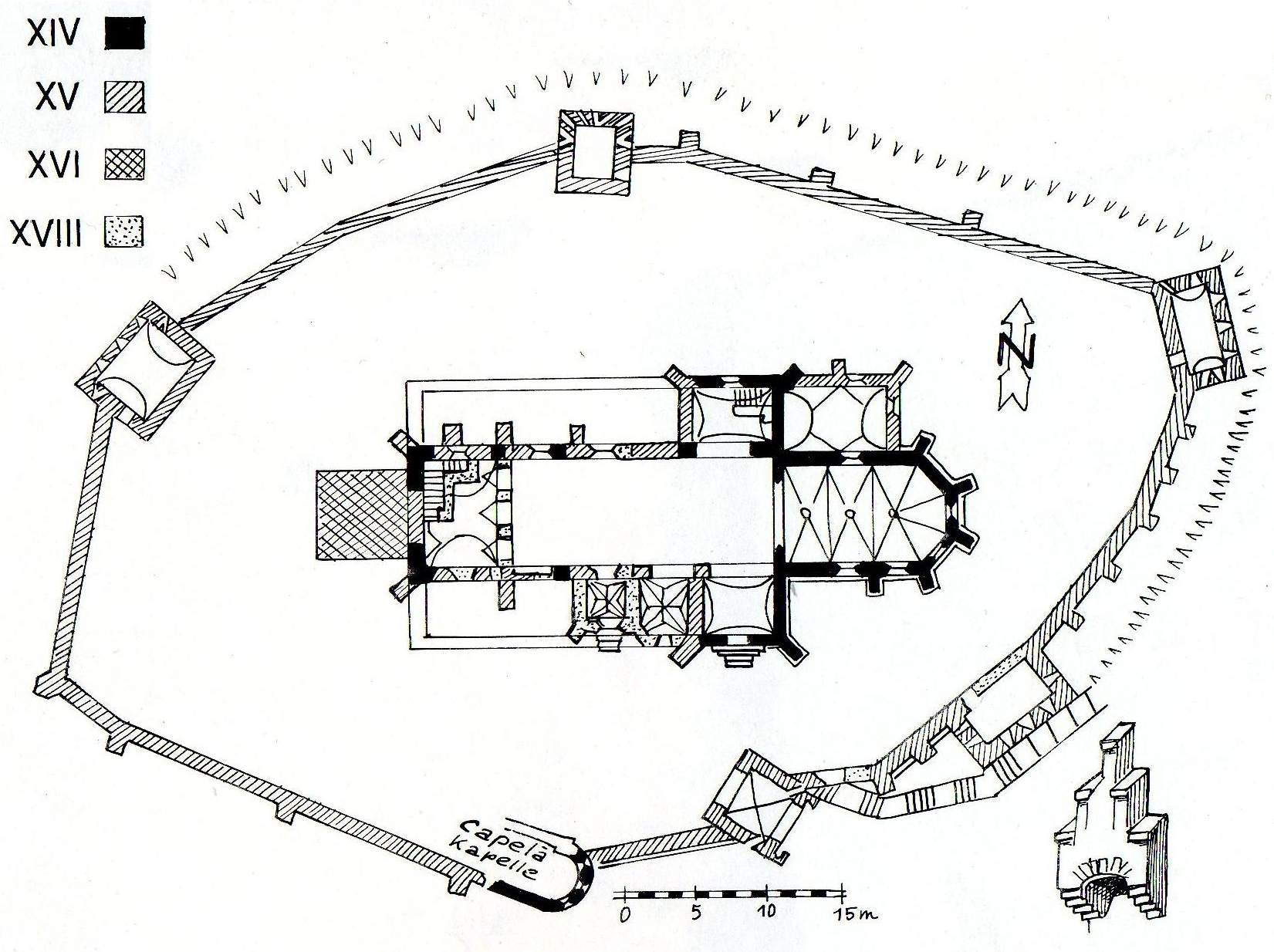
The plan of the medieval Evangelical Lutheran Transylvanian Saxon fortified church of Șaroș pe Târnave

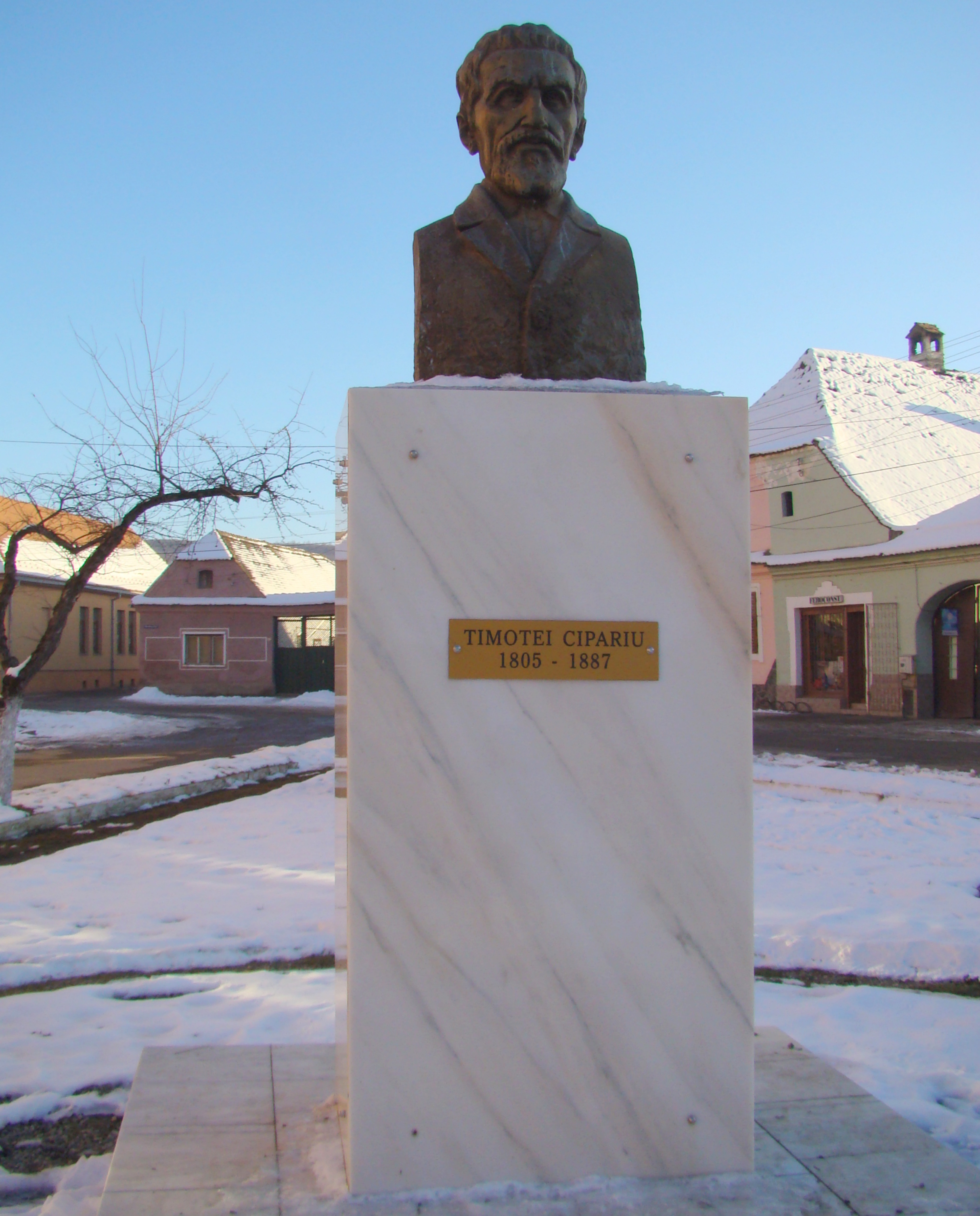
Statue of Timotei Cipariu

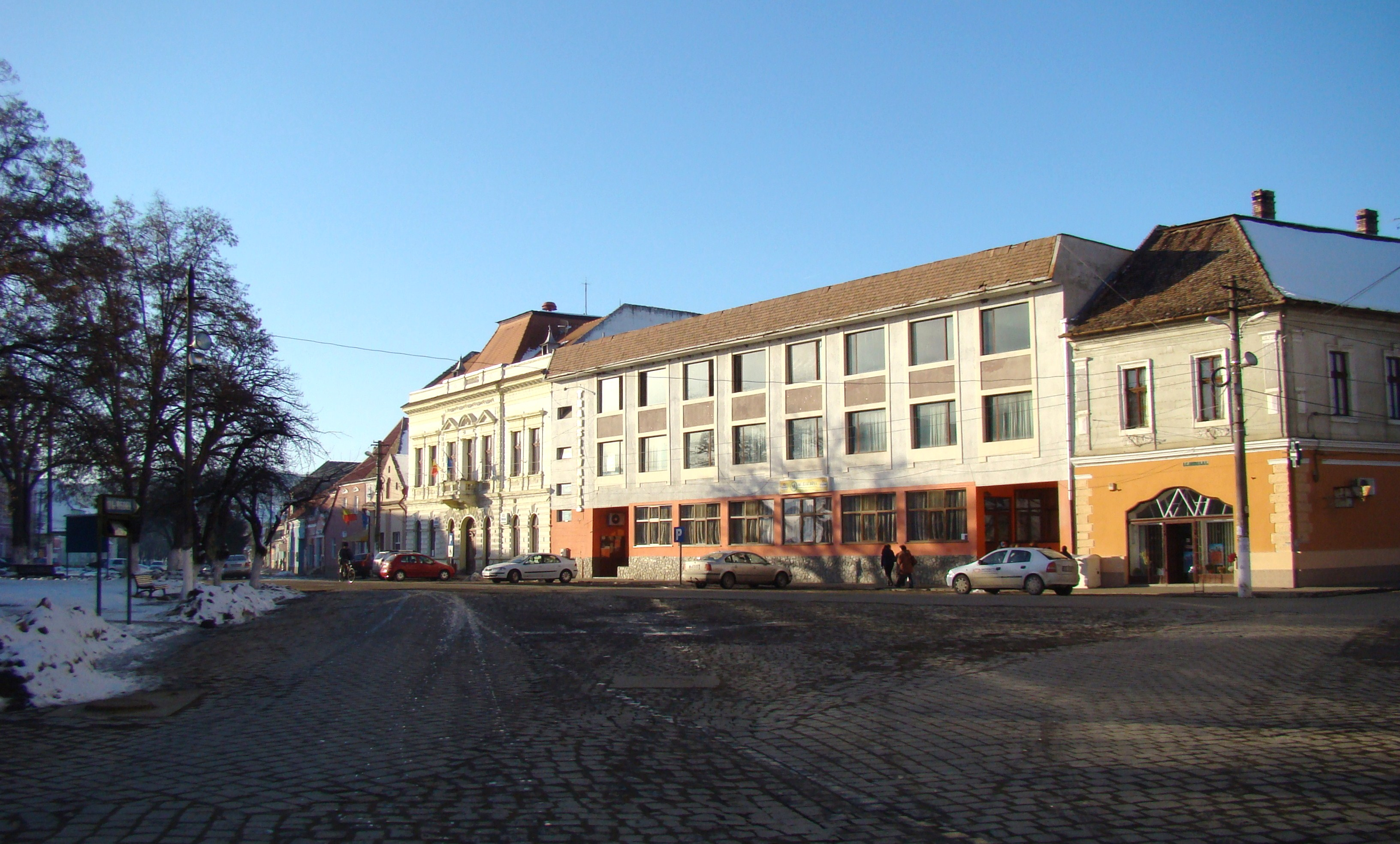
Timotei Cipariu square in central Dumbrăveni

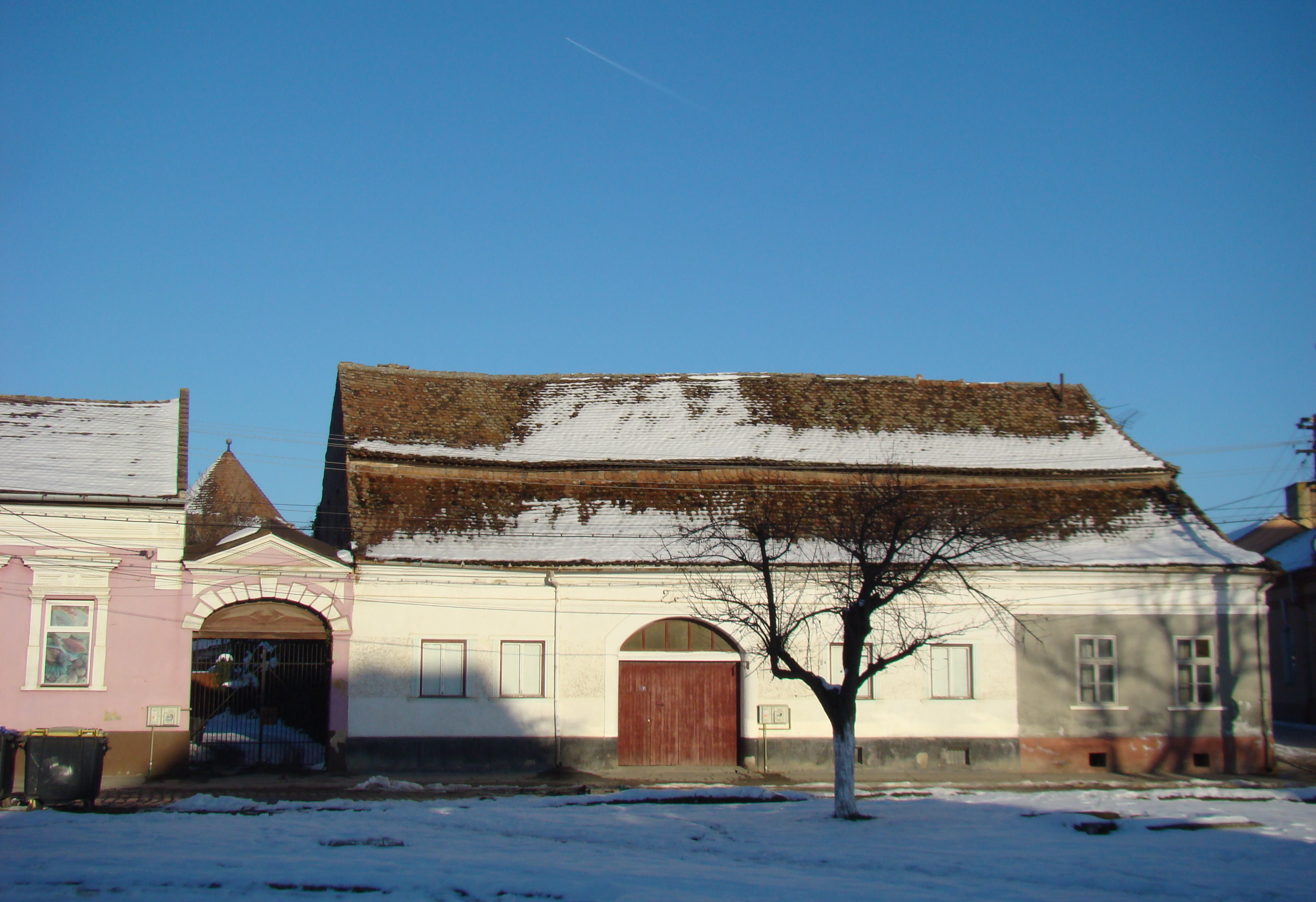
Historic house in Dumbrăveni

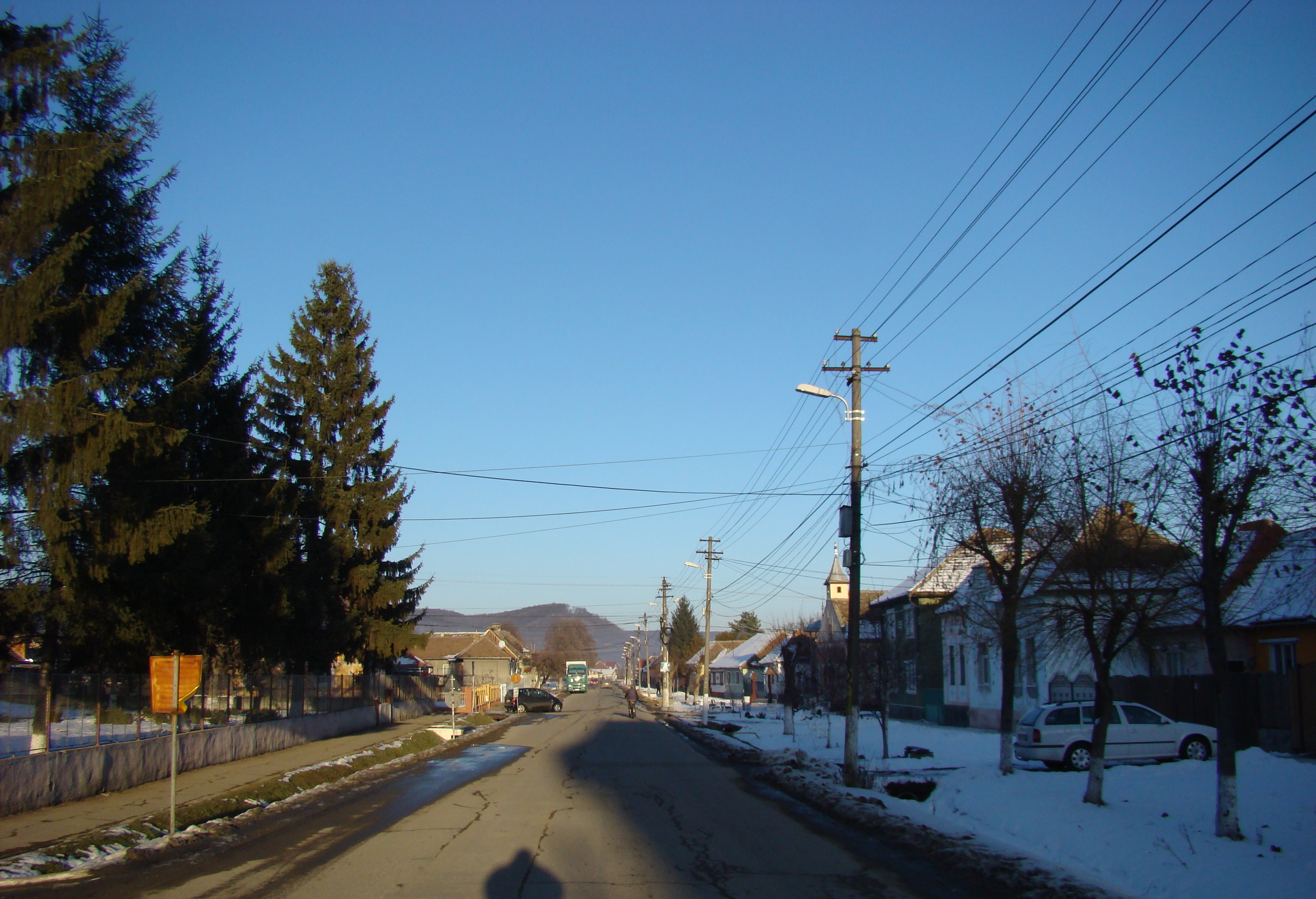
Road to Hoghilag

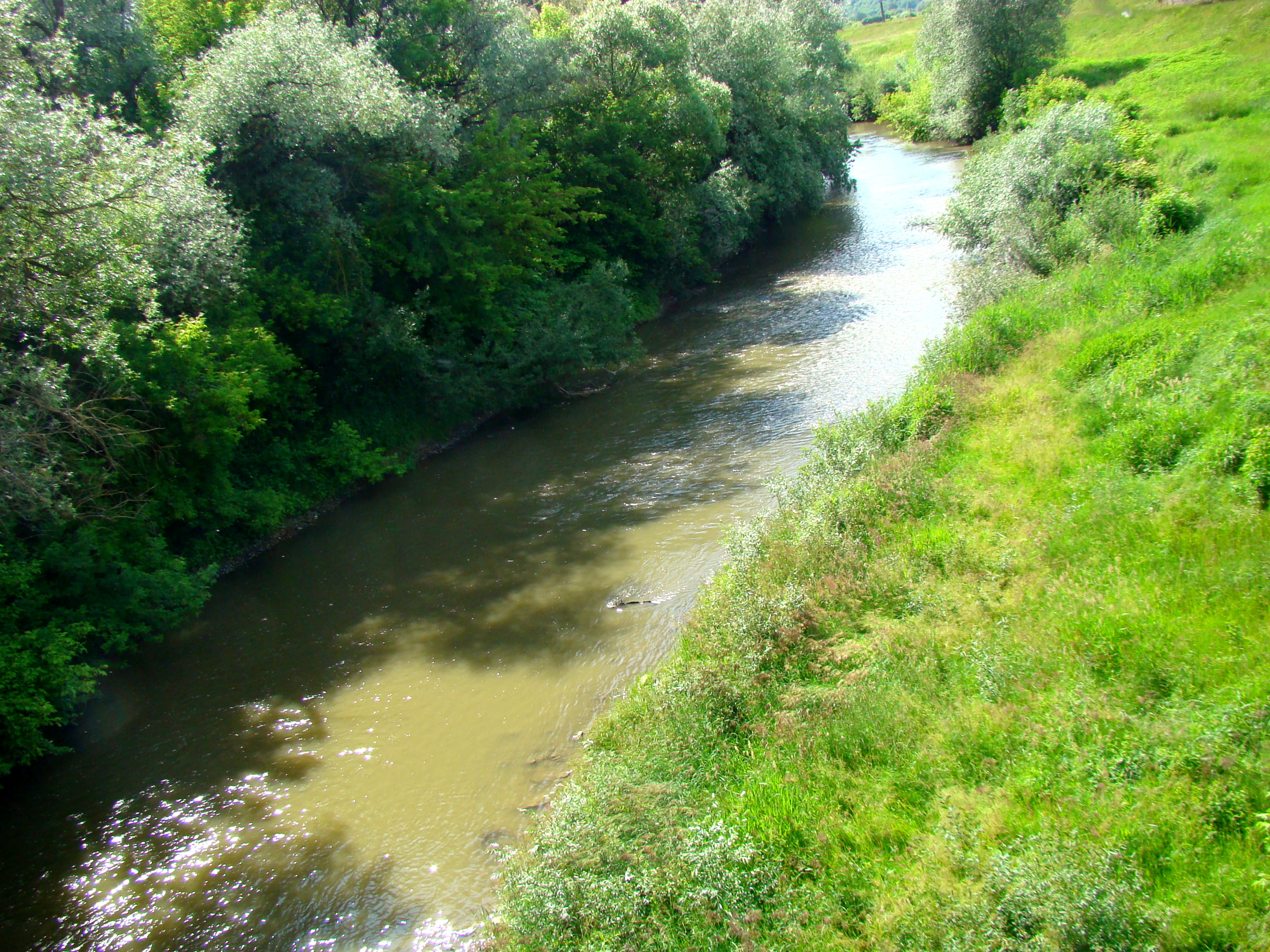
Târnava Mare river in Dumbrăveni

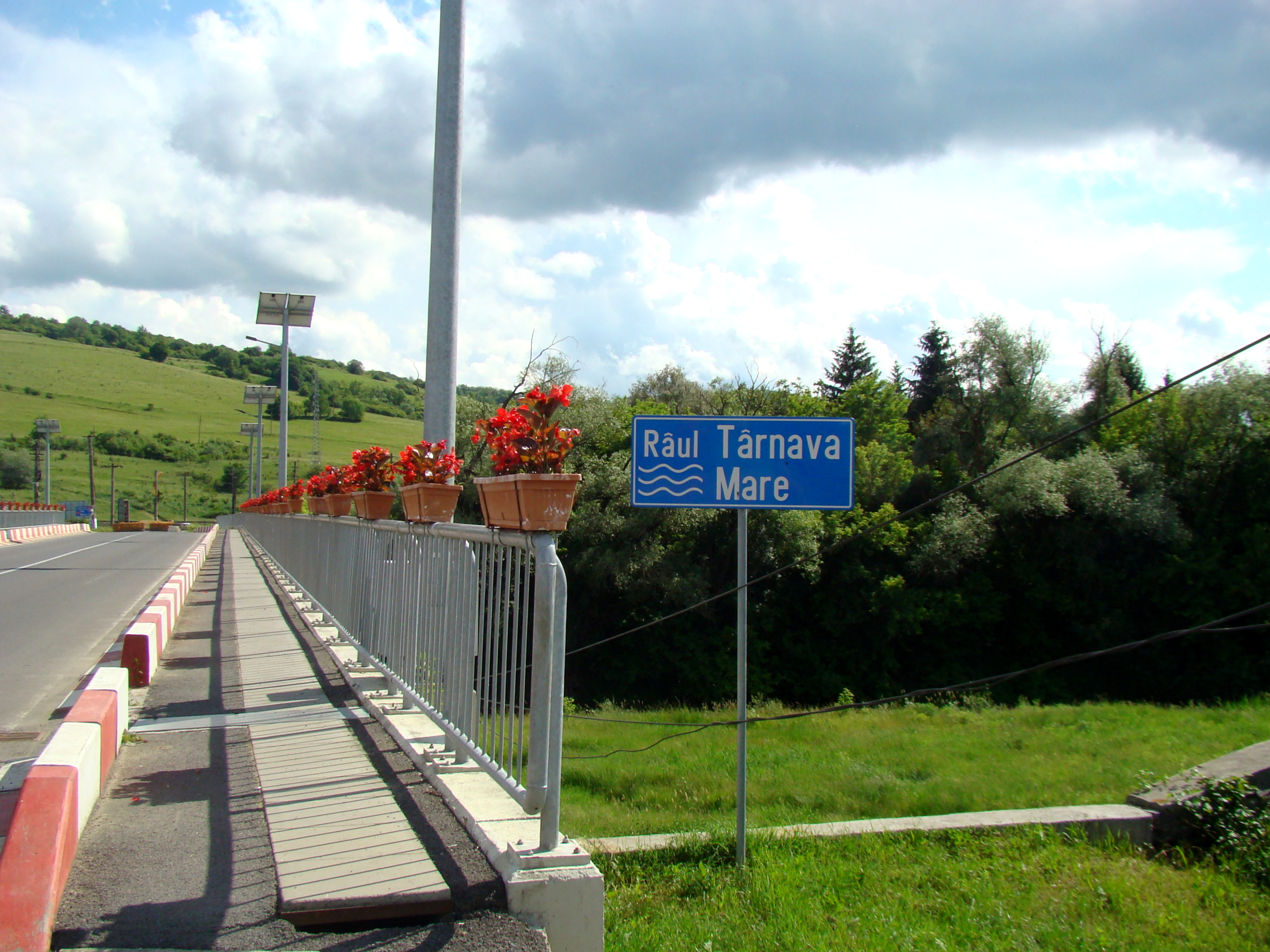
