= Dumbrăveni Prison =

Prison in Dumbrăveni, Romania

Dumbrăveni Prison was a prison located in Dumbrăveni, Romania.

Construction of the prison began in 1909, under Austria-Hungary. It was linked by a corridor to the courthouse, built simultaneously. A surrounding fence was added in 1942. During the interwar period, the prison housed common criminals, especially thieves and abortionists. It had a separate section for political prisoners, both men and women. It became a center of indoctrination for Romanian Communist Party cadres, among them Olga Bancic and Liuba Chișinevschi; at one point, they wrote a letter protesting against conditions. Ana Pauker spent time at Dumbrăveni, where she was allowed visits from fellow detainees, with whom she would hold long conversations; a woman came every day to prepare her food. She organized a school, offering courses in French, German, Marxism–Leninism, and political economy. Communist prisoners could have contacts on the outside and receive packages. As a result, the warden, Bazgan, was fired, despite protestations by General Ioan Topor of the Romanian Gendarmerie, and, on March 5, 1940, all communist prisoners were transferred to Râmnicu Sărat Prison, on orders from General Ioan Bengliu. In 1942, male communists were sent to Dumbrăveni. A bombardment by German aviation on the night of 8–9 September 1944, following the August 23 coup d'état, created a panic. At least 64 prisoners escaped, although fourteen later returned or were captured. By early December, no political prisoners remained.

From 1944 to 1967, the prison held various categories of detainees, including common criminals, accused war criminals and Iron Guard members. Eugen Cristescu and Nicolae Macici were among the men who passed through. From 1955, the political prisoners were only women. Two condemned war criminals escaped in 1945. The spare, dirty women's cells were covered in mildew and full of mice. The food was insufficient, though generally fresh, while the cold was often unbearable in winter, often causing hypothermia at the extremities. Rigorous nighttime inspections were common, medical care nearly non-existent and hygiene consisted of a short weekly shower. Three women caught up in the Lucrețiu Pătrășcanu case spent over a year at Dumbrăveni: his widow Elena, Victoria Sîrbu and Lena Constante. All of them left behind detailed descriptions of the strict isolation, undernourishment, lack of medical attention and corporal punishment to which they were subjected. Other inmates included the diplomat Micaela Catargi and Măriuca, the widow of Mircea Vulcănescu, as well as Ecaterina, the wife of Virgil Madgearu and Dorina, the wife of Virgil Potârcă. Several guards were punished after it was learned that they had maintained sexual relations with female detainees and, in violation of regulations, allowed them letters from their families.
