= Noul Săsesc gas field =

Natural gas field in Sibiu County, Romania

Noul Săsesc
- Country: Romania
- Region: Sibiu County
- Offshore/onshore: onshore
- Coordinates: 46°6′38″N 24°36′24″E
- Operator: Romgaz

Field history
- Discovery: 1920
- Start of development: 1920
- Start of production: 1925

Production
- Current production of gas: 2×10^{6} m^{3}/d 70×10^{6} cu ft/d 0.72×10^{9} m^{3}/a (25×10^{9} cu ft/a)
- Estimated gas in place: 100×10^{9} m^{3} 3.55×10^{12} cu ft

The Noul Săsesc gas field is a natural gas field located in Laslea, Sibiu County, Romania. Discovered in 1920, it was developed by Romgaz, beginning production of natural gas and condensates in 1925. By 2010 the total proven reserves of the Noul Săsesc gas field were around 3.55 trillion ft^{3} (100 km^{3}), with a production rate of around 70 million ft^{3}/day (2×10^{5} m^{3}).

== History ==
In the 1920s, large deposits of natural gas were discovered near the Nou Săsesc village of Laslea commune, a discovery that led to the drilling of wells and the exploitation of those deposits. In the early 1930s, the Methane Gas National Society (SONAMETAN) launched a campaign for the promotion of natural gas and the expansion of its distribution network. These efforts helped the Noul Săsesc gas field get connected to Sibiu in 1936 and Ocna Mureș in 1937. In 1938, planning began for a pipeline that would connect Brașov to Noul Săsesc's distribution network, culminating in the delivery of 90,000 kg (200,000 lb) of 30 cm (12 in) steel pipes from Germany via 1,000 rail cars the following year. Upon completion in 1942, the pipeline added not only Brașov to the network, but the industrial centers of Făgăraș and Ucea as well. Further expansion of the Noul Săsesc pipeline network continued through the end of World War II, with methane gas able to be delivered to the industrial centers of Bod, Zărnești, and—through an extension of the pipeline to Câmpina—the distribution network of Bucharest, by 1945.

Expansions to the pipeline network continued after the war, and by 1970 was able to deliver natural gas directly to Bucharest, along with the cities of Victoria, Făgăraș, and Brașov.

In 2022, Romgaz allocated 11,200,000 leis for preparatory work, drilling, and production tests at the Noul Săsesc gas field, The following year it announced plans to maintain and upgrade several wells at Noul Săsesc.
