= Nadeș gas field =

Natural gas field in Mureș County, Romania

Nadeș
- Country: Romania
- Region: Mureș County
- Offshore/onshore: onshore
- Operator: Romgaz

Field history
- Discovery: 1915
- Start of development: 1915
- Start of production: 1934

Production
- Current production of gas: 500×10^{3} m^{3}/d 17.5×10^{6} cu ft/d 0.18×10^{9} m^{3}/a (6.4×10^{9} cu ft/a)
- Estimated gas in place: 10×10^{9} m^{3} 355×10^{9} cu ft

The Nadeș gas field is a natural gas field located in Nadeș in Mureș County, Romania. Discovered in 1915, it was developed by Romgaz, beginning production of natural gas and condensates in 1930. By 2010 the total proven reserves of the Nadeș gas field were around 355 billion ft^{3} (10.1 billion m^{3}), with a production rate of around 17.5 million cu ft/d (500,000 m^{3}/d).

According to data provided by the Romanian Agency for Mineral Resources, the Nadeș gas field is the 9th largest in Romania, while the Nadeș–Prod–Seleuș complex ranks 3rd, with a gas production of 313.3 billion m^{3} (11.06 trillion cu ft) in 2022.

The gas deposits in Romania have a very long history of exploitation, almost unique at the level of Europe and among the few such old fields that are still in production in the world. A quarter of Romania's natural gas reserves (100 billion m^{3} (3.5 trillion cu ft)) are located in Western Moldavia, Muntenia, and the Black Sea, with the remaining 75% located near methane gas reserve sites in Transylvania. A fifth of these sites are located in the Giurgeu-Brașov Depression and Sibiu County, with the remainder located in Mureș County at sites such as Luduș, Șincai, Bazna, and Zau de Câmpie.

The oldest deposits exploited by Romgaz are in Mureș County, where gas has been extracted since 1913. The Nadeș gas field started being exploited in 1934. As of 2006, there were four underground gas storage sites in Transylvania: at Târgu Mureș, Sărmășel, Nadeș-Prod, and Cetatea de Baltă.

In 2013, Romgaz awarded 5.6 million leis ($1.7 million) to the local company Foraj Sonde for drilling and exploration works at the 302 Nadeș well. In 2022, Romgaz allocated 25 million leis for preparatory work, drilling, and production tests at the exploitation wells 208, 209, and 210 at the Nadeș gas field.

== See also ==
- List of natural gas fields
- List of natural gas fields in Romania
- Natural gas in Romania
