= Caragele gas field =

Natural gas field in Buzău County, Romania

Caragele
- Country: Romania
- Region: Buzău County
- Block: RG06
- Offshore/onshore: onshore
- Operator: Romgaz

Field history
- Discovery: 2016
- Start of development: 2020
- Start of production: 2020+

Production
- Estimated gas in place: 28.2×10^{9} m^{3} 986×10^{9} cu ft

The Caragele gas field is a natural gas field located in Luciu, Buzău County, Romania in the RG06 block. Announced by Romgaz on June 30, 2016, it was one of the largest onshore gas fields discovered in the country since 2005, with a length of 35 km (22 mi), depth of 4,000 m (13,000 ft), and total proven reserves of around 986 billion ft^{3} (28.2 km^{3}). Sorin Grindeanu, the Prime Minister of Romania at the time, dubbed it "the most important discovery" since the fall of communism in 1989.

Test production conducted at the gas field in 2016 indicated that it will produce between 8.12 million ft^{3}/day (0.23×10^{5} m^{3}) and 12.76 million ft^{3}/day (0.365×10^{5} m^{3}) of natural gas and condensates for each drilled well after it begins operations.

== History ==
Work at the gas field started in May 2017, with Grindeanu, PSD leader Liviu Dragnea, and Senate President Călin Popescu Tăriceanu attending the launching ceremony.

In January 2020, Romgaz announced that it had boosted gas production by 30% from the Caragele field with the start up of new wells. According to data provided by the Romanian Agency for Mineral Resources, the Caragele field produced 282.672×10^{6} m^{3} (1×10^{10} cu ft) of gas in 2022, making it the 5th largest in Romania in terms of natural gas production, although its full potential remains to be realized. Indeed, the Caragele gas field had by then 30×10^{9} m^{3} (1.1×10^{12} cu ft) in gas reserves, making it the field with the largest onshore gas reserves in Romania. According to comments made in August 2022 by Virgil-Daniel Popescu, the then-Minister of Energy of Romania, the Caragele gas field will start full production in 2023; one month later, the deadline was pushed to 2024. Marcel Ciolacu (originally from nearby Buzău, and the current Prime Minister) estimated at the time that Caragele's gas could come online in early 2024.

== See also ==
- List of natural gas fields
- List of natural gas fields in Romania
- Natural gas in Romania
