= Mamu gas field =

Natural gas field in Vâlcea County, Romania

Coordinates: 44.7133°N 24.1183°E

Mamu
- Country: Romania
- Region: Vâlcea County
- Offshore/onshore: onshore
- Operator: Petrom

Field history
- Discovery: 1980
- Start of development: 1980
- Start of production: 1988

Production
- Current production of gas: 2.4×10^{6} m^{3}/d 84×10^{6} cu ft/d 0.85×10^{9} m^{3}/a (30×10^{9} cu ft/a)
- Estimated gas in place: 7.8×10^{9} m^{3} 276×10^{9} cu ft

The Mamu gas field is a natural gas field in Mamu village, Mădulari commune, Vâlcea County, Romania. Discovered in 1980, it was developed by Petrom, beginning production of natural gas and condensates at the Mamu 4337 gas deposit in 1988.

From 1992 to 2004, Shell invested over US$230 million into oil and natural gas production in Romania, which led to the opening of a gas condensate field at Mamu. The Mamu 4320 gas deposit was discovered in 2007. In 2009 the total proven reserves of the Mamu gas field were around 276 billion feet^{3} (7.8 km^{3}), with production expected to increase from 24 million ft^{3}/day (0.68×10^{5}m^{3}) in 2007 to a maximum rate of 84 million ft^{3}/day (2.4×10^{5} m^{3}).

In 2011, the Mamu 4335 and 4338 wells were drilled at a depth of around 5,000 m (16,000 ft) as part of the Mamu gas field redevelopment program, which includes the drilling of new wells and the modernization of surface production facilities. As a result, the production on the field increased by about 2,800 BOE/d (1.6×10^{10} BTU/d).

In 2018, the Mamu 4317 well was drilled by Petrom in the vicinity of the Mamu gas field, at a depth of about 4,400 m (14,400 ft) and confirmed the existence of gas and condensate. Due to the proximity to the existing infrastructure, the well went into production at the end of October 2018, with an initial volume of over 190×10^{3} m^{3}/d (6.7×10^{6} cu ft/d).

As of 2018, the Manu gas field had a production of 4,500 BOE/d (2.6×10^{10} BTU/d), enough to heat approximately 180,000 homes.

== See also ==
- List of natural gas fields
- List of natural gas fields in Romania
- Natural gas in Romania
