= Bazna gas field =

Natural gas field in Sibiu County, Romania

Bazna
- Country: Romania
- Region: Sibiu County
- Offshore/onshore: onshore
- Operator: Romgaz

Field history
- Discovery: 1912
- Start of development: 1912
- Start of production: 1915

Production
- Current production of gas: 670×10^{3} m^{3}/d 23.8×10^{6} cu ft/d 0.24×10^{9} m^{3}/a (8.5×10^{9} cu ft/a)
- Estimated gas in place: 30×10^{9} m^{3} 1.065×10^{12} cu ft

The Bazna gas field is a natural gas field located in Bazna, Sibiu County, Romania. Discovered in 1912, it was developed by Romgaz, beginning production of natural gas and condensates in 1915. By 2010 the total proven reserves of the Bazna gas field were around 1.06 trillion ft^{3} (30 km^{3}), with a production rate of around 23.8 million ft^{3}/day (0.67×10^{5} m^{3}).

== History ==
There are numerous mentions attesting natural gas emanations in the Transylvanian Plateau. The existence of natural gas in Transylvania was known since the 17th century. People in Bazna were often puzzled by "inextinguishable fires". In 1671, while some shepherds at Bazna were lighting a fire, they incidentally discovered a gas inrush.

The gas deposits in Romania have a very long history of exploitation, almost unique at the level of Europe and among the few such old fields that are still in production in the world. A quarter of Romania's natural gas reserves (100 billion m^{3} (3.5 trillion cu ft)) are located in Western Moldavia, Muntenia, and the Black Sea, with the remaining 75% located near methane gas reserve sites in Transylvania. A fifth of these sites are located in the Giurgeu-Brașov Depression and Sibiu County, with the remainder located in Mureș County at sites such as Luduș, Șincai, Bazna, and Nadeș.

In the interwar period, Romania's program of geological works and drilling was amplified, highlighting the gas deposits from Copșa Mică, Bazna, Șaroș, and Șincai. At Bazna, natural gases were trapped by means of cones mounted above the shafts where mineral water was extracted; the gas was used to illuminate the local promenades. As recorded in 1933, the gas extracted at Bazna was 97.9% methane, 1.5% acetylene, and 0.6% carbon dioxide.

In 2010, Romgaz announced that it will construct a direct road from Mediaș, where its headquarters are located, to the Bazna commune—about 15 km (9.3 mi) to the northwest—to facilitate access to the wells at the gas field. Romgaz also operates a spa complex and sports recreation center in Bazna, mostly for its 6,000 employees.

== See also ==
- List of natural gas fields
- List of natural gas fields in Romania
- Natural gas in Romania
