= Ghercești =

- Commune
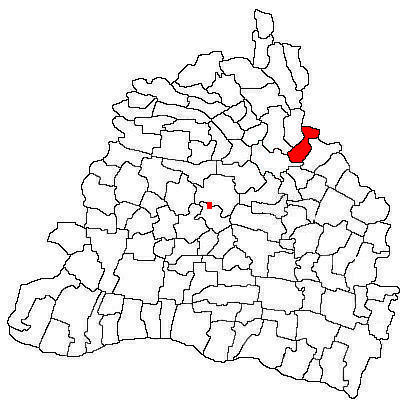
- Location in Dolj County

- Location in Romania
- Coordinates: 44°21′N 23°54′E
- Country: Romania
- County: Dolj

Government
  - Mayor (2024–2028): Nolică-Cornel Păpăroiu (PSD)
- Area: 50.04 km^{2} (19.32 sq mi)
- Elevation: 175 m (574 ft)
- Population (2021-12-01): 2,132
  - Density: 43/km^{2} (110/sq mi)
- Time zone: EET/EEST (UTC+2/+3)
- Postal code: 207280
- Area code: +(40) 251
- Vehicle reg.: DJ
- Website: primariaghercesti.ro

Ghercești is a commune in Dolj County, Oltenia, Romania with a population of 2,132 people as of 2021. It is composed of five villages: Gârlești, Ghercești, Luncșoru, Ungureni, and Ungurenii Mici.

== Natives ==
- Ion Stănescu (1929–2010), communist politician, head of the Securitate (1968–1972)
