= Filitelnic gas field =

Natural gas field in Romania

Filitelnic
- Country: Romania
- Region: Mureș County
- Offshore/onshore: onshore
- Coordinates: 46.3669°N 24.6661°E
- Operator: Romgaz

Field history
- Discovery: 1958
- Start of development: 1958
- Start of production: 1961

Production
- Current production of gas: 4×10^{6} m^{3}/d 143×10^{6} cu ft/d 1.46×10^{9} m^{3}/a (52×10^{9} cu ft/a)
- Estimated gas in place: 60×10^{9} m^{3} 2.145×10^{12} cu ft

The Filitelnic gas field is a natural gas field in the Filitelnic village of Bălăușeri commune, Mureș County, Romania lying in the center of the Transylvanian Basin, a major natural gas-producing region. It was discovered in 1958 and is developed by Romgaz. It began production in 1961 and produces natural gas and condensates.

The total proven reserves of the Filitelnic gas field are around 2.145 trillion cubic feet (60.7 km^{3}), and production is around 143 million cubic feet per day (4,000,000 m^{3}/d). A project announced in January 2024 by Romgaz and the Mureș County Environmental Protection Agency will seek to reduce pollution and concomitantly increase production at the Filitelnic drilling group 131.

In the early 2000s, the Filitelnic gas field was the second largest natural gas field in Romania. According to data provided in 2016 by the Romanian Agency for Mineral Resources (ANRM), the Filitelnic gas field was the largest natural gas field in the country. Based on data from ANRM, the Filitelnic gas field had a production of 624.646×10^{6} m^{3} (2.2×10^{10} cu ft) in 2022, making it the second largest (onshore) natural gas field in Romania, after the Bustuchin gas field.

== See also ==
- List of natural gas fields
- List of natural gas fields in Romania
- Natural gas in Romania
