= Giurgeu-Brașov Depression =

Series of intermontane basins in Romania

The Giurgeu-Brașov Depression (in Romanian, Depresiunea Giurgeu-Brașovului) is a series of intermontane basins in Romania.

The basin is considered part of the Inner Eastern Carpathians. Within Romania, however, it is traditional to divide the Eastern Carpathians in Romanian territory into three geographical groups (north, center, south), instead in Outer and Inner Eastern Carpathians. The Romanian categorization is indicated below.

Volcanic mineral waters and health resorts are abundant in these basins.

Components of the Giurgeu-Brașov Depression include:

- Giurgeu Depression (Depresiunea Giurgeului), with rock outcroppings formed by the headwaters of the Mureș River. In Romania these are considered part of the central Carpathians of Moldavia and Transylvania (Munții Carpați Moldo-Transilvani), or "MMT"
- Ciuc Depression (Depresiunea Ciucului), considered part of the MMT
- Brașov Depression (Depresiunea Brașovului), in Romania considered part of the Curvature Carpathians
