= Romgaz =

Natural gas company based in Romania

SNGN ROMGAZ SA
- Type: Societate pe Acțiuni
- Traded as: BVB: SNG
- Industry: Oil & gas
- Founded: 1909
- Headquarters: Mediaș, Romania
- Key people: Răzvan Popescu, CEO
- Products: Natural gas
- Revenue: ▲€1.59 billion (2025)
- Net income: ▲€661.02 million (2025)
- Number of employees: ▼5,809 (2025)
- Subsidiaries: Depogaz, Romgaz Black Sea Limited, Romgaz Trading SRL
- Website: www.romgaz.ro

Societatea Națională de Gaze Naturale Romgaz SA Mediaș (SNGN Romgaz SA) or simply Romgaz is the largest natural gas producer in Romania and one of the largest producers in Eastern Europe. The company is the country's main supplier and responsible for producing around 40% of the total natural gas consumption in Romania.

Its majority stockholder is the Government of Romania, which owns 70.01%, while the remaining 29.09% are free-floated. In 2018, the company was the only state owned company surpassing €1 billion in revenues.

Romgaz is specialized in geological research for the discovery of hydrocarbons, production, storage, commercialization and the supply of natural gas and natural gas condensate. The company is structured into six branches: two production branches located in Târgu Mureș and Mediaș, one underground storage branch located in Ploiești, a special operations branch located in Mediaș, a maintenance branch located in Târgu Mureș and one international office located in Bratislava, Slovakia.

== History ==
=== Early history and foundation (1909–1960) ===
On the present-day territory of Romania, the first natural gas deposit was discovered in 1909, in Sărmășel, Mureș County (then in Austria-Hungary), further to geological researches on potassium salts. The first gas production was used to power the steam boilers in Sărmășel and the gas lighting of the alleys in Bazna resort. The first gas transmission pipeline was built in 1914 covering the 55 km (34 mi) between Sărmășel and Turda, with the last being the first city in Europe to have public street lights fuelled by natural gas in 1916. In 1927 the first natural gas compression station in Europe was built in Sărmășel. Following the successful gas discovery many foreign companies started to prospect the territories including American, British, French, and Austria-Hungarian companies. The American success in the exploitation and usage of natural gas determined the foundation of Societatea Maghiară de Gaz Metan UEG (Hungarian Methane Company) by the Hungarian Ministry of Finances and Deutsche Bank whose scope of activity was the exploration, exploitation, transmission, distribution and use of natural gas in certain regions within Transylvania. A prodigious period followed for the gas distribution business and the year 1941 marks the construction of the first natural gas pipeline from Mănești to Bucharest, while the following year a main pipeline is built for the transportation of natural gas from Transylvania to the capital city. After the unification of Transylvania and Romania in 1919 the Direcția gazului natural company is established at Cluj affiliated to the Ministry of Industry and Commerce in Bucharest, which later in 1925 was renamed to Societatea Națională de Gaz Metan SONAMETAN (National Methane Company).

=== Early expansions and formation of today's company (1961–2001) ===
The first underground storage facility was operated in 1961, and in 1976 the company's largest natural gas output was realised 29.8 cubic kilometers. In 1991 the company is renamed as Regia Autonomă Romgaz RA and in 1998 it is renamed as Societatea Națională de Gaze Naturale Romgaz SA. In the year 2000, Romgaz was then divided into five smaller independent companies: Exprogaz, Depogaz, Transgaz, Distrigaz Sud, and Distrigaz Nord. And in 2001, Exprogaz and Depogaz were merged to create SNGN Romgaz SA the current company.

=== Privatization (2004–2013) ===
Until 2004, the government of Romania held 100% of shares in Romgaz and in 2005, first announced plans of privatizing the company. Discussions over possible investors were held until 2006 and then further delayed several times and eventually pushed back until 2009. In 2010, plans to sell 15% of the company resurfaced but another two years went by, before details of the deal to be became more specific. The government then decided to sell 15% of different energy companies via initial and secondary public offerings. Romgaz finally debuted the planned percentage of shares on Romanian and London stock exchanges in November 2013. The IPO became the largest in the history of Romania, raising almost €390 million.

In 2007, Romgaz was granted eight concessions by the Romanian National Agency for Mineral Resources (ANRM) and announced to invest €220 million annually into exploration in the concession areas over the next three or four years (2007–2010). In the same year, Gazprom negotiated the establishment of a joint-venture with Romgaz, to build and operate storage facilities for up to two billion cubic meters of gas.

In 2010, Templeton which since 2009 manages the Romanian national compensation fund Fondul Protrietatea, threatened legal action against the Romanian government, which attempted to use their shareholder superiority to channel money from the company to compensate for a national budget deficit. In 2015, Fondul sold a 3.78% stake in Romgaz and in 2016, sold another stake worth $132 million.

In November 2013, after several years of delay in the privatization process, the government took a 15% stake of Romgaz public. The IPO raised $520 million. Following the initial offering, the company's shares rose and Romgaz was valued at around $4.0 billion. The IPO was part of a wider privatization agreement between Romania and the International Monetary Fund.

=== Recent developments (since 2013) ===
In 2015, Romgaz announced that the company would expand their conventional gas operations and not invest into shale-gas technologies and exploration for now. General Director Virgil Metea stated: "Let's say in the medium term, up to five years, we do not plan shale gas (exploration). This is our current stance."

In June 2016, Romgaz, Transgaz and OMV Petrom were raided by EU antitrust regulation agencies, suspected of working together to block gas exports to other EU countries.

In 2017, the company announced the discovery a new gas field. The Caragele gas field, with total proven reserves of around 986 billion cubic feet (28.2 km^{3}), was the largest gas discovery by Romgaz in the previous three decades. Production at the field began in 2019. A total of three wells were completed by 2025.

In 2018, news about a potential partnership between Romgaz and Azeri group Socar in different Black Sea offshore gas and pipeline projects surfaced. In November 2018, the company announced that it has ordered a feasibility study for a possible new gas power plant with a 400-500 MW capacity, to be erected in Mintia, near Deva.

In February 2019, a Romanian delegation led by Iulian-Robert Tudorache, State Secretary of the Romanian Ministry of Energy, together with representatives of the Romanian companies Transgaz and Romgaz, visited Azerbaijan's Energy Ministry to discuss the potential participation of Romania in the Southern Gas Corridor.

In August 2022, Romgaz bought ExxonMobil Exploration, whose assets included a 50% interest in the deep sea Neptun Deep gas project in the Black Sea, from ExxonMobil for $1 billion. The first development drilling at the Neptun gas field took place in March 2025 and construction of a pipeline for the field started in May 2026. In May 2024, Romgaz opened the Chișinău Natural Gas Supply Branch in Moldova.

== Corporate affairs ==
=== Structure ===
Romgaz has some minor subsidiaries. Since December 31, 2016 the company S.N.G.N. ROMGAZ S.A. – Filiala de Înmagazinare Subterană a Gazelor Naturale DEPOGAZ Ploiești S.R.L. operates as a subsidiary, which is in charge of operating Romgaz's gas storage facilities. Further subsidiaries include Romgaz Black Sea Limited, formerly ExxonMobil Explorations, and Romgaz Trading SRL.

=== Leadership ===
Romgaz is led by a seven-member board of directors, led by Non-independent Non-executive Chairman Marius-Gabriel Nuț. In May 2023, the company appointed Răzvan Popescu as chief executive officer for a four year term.

=== Shareholder ===
As of March 31, 2026, Romgaz's shareholder structure is:

- 70.01% Romanian State (through the Ministry of Energy)
- 29.09% Free Float

=== Performance ===
For 2018, Romgaz planned investments of RON 1.6 billion, with around 50% designated for the construction of a new thermal power plant in Iernut. In February 2019, Romgaz announced preliminary results for 2018, reporting a total turnover of RON 5 billion ($1.2 billion) and net profits of 1.4 billion ($330 million).

== Operations ==
Romania is one of the region's only countries to be largely energy independent. The country imports less than 10 percent of its total gas demand from Russia. The rest is produced locally, with Romgaz being one of the two major players in the market.

=== Upstream operations ===
In 2017, Romgaz reported proven gas reserves of 60.1 billion cubic metres (bcm), with additional 10.6 bcm probable and 12.8 bcm possible.

==== National ====
The production and storage of natural gas is realised by around 3,600 rigs and 20 compression stations. Romgaz owns a total of 153 commercial reservoirs located in Transylvania, Moldavia, and Muntenia with around 75% or 114 being located in Transylvania especially in Mureș and Sibiu counties. The company produced in 2009 5.76 cubic kilometers of natural gas and expects a 5% decrease in production for 2010 to around 5.65 cubic kilometers. The company operates several large natural gas fields like Bazna, Brodina, Caragele, Copșa Mică, Deleni, Filitelnic, Grădiștea, Laslău Mare, Mamu, Roman-Secuieni, Șamșud, Sărmașel, Sighișoara, and Zau de Câmpie, with combined reserves exceeding 4.351 TCF (112 km^{3}).

Romgaz has established partnerships with different companies in a total of 15 petroleum concessions based in Romania. The company has joint-ventures with Wintershall in the exploration and development of the RG 03 Transilvania South Block, with Falcon Oil & Gas in the exploitation of the Brodina and Cuejdiu Blocks, with Amromco Energy in the rehabilitation of 11 gas fields and with Schlumberger for the rehabilitation of Laslău Mare gas field.

In 2017, total revenue for natural gas production and supply were $858 million (RON 3,604.96 million), representing a 32.6 percent increase in total income compared to 2016.

==== International ====
In 2008 Romgaz became co-titleholder of petroleum rights and obligations in 3 blocks from Slovakia and 2 blocks from Poland. Romgaz holds 25% interest share in three exploration blocks from Slovakia, namely Svidník gas field, Medzilaborce and Snina, and an interest share of 30% in two blocks from Poland, namely Torzym-Cybinka oil field.

In 2010, Romgaz announced that it has acquired stakes in five oil and gas fields located in Iraq.

=== Storage ===
Romgaz's subsidiary Depogaz operates five underground gas storage facilities, with a total capacity of 2.87 billion cubic meters, equaling about 90.54% of Romania's storage capacity.

The storage facilities are located in Sărmăşel and Cetatea de Baltă in Transylvania, Bilciurești, Bălăceanca, Urziceni, and Ghercești in Southern Romania. The company also owns other storage facilities in joint-ventures with other companies like Depomureș in Târgu Mureș and Amgaz in Nadeș. The largest of the six storages is the Bilciurești facility located 40 km (25 mi) north-northwest of Bucharest having a storage capacity of 1.3 cubic kilometers in one cycle and it is located at a depth of 2,000 m (6,600 ft).

Romgaz also operates a transmission network of pipelines, exceeding 3,000 km (1,900 mi).

In 2017, total revenue for storage was $110 million (RON 464.18 million), representing a 46.44 percent increase in total income compared to 2016.

Romgaz also owns a 41% stake in Engie's Depomures gas storage facility.

=== Electricity production ===
In 2017, Romgaz produced 1,863,788 MWh (+14.5% compared to 2016), representing 2.68% of Romania's total electricity production. According to Transelectrica, the company's market share in 2017 was 2.95%. Most of Romgaz' electricity production comes from the Iernut Power Station, a large thermal power plant located in Iernut, Mureș County.

The company also runs experimental power generation projects at gas wells, that are located to far away to make a connection to Romania's national transmission system feasible. Currently wells Cojocna 2 and 4 are equipped with a 1.5 MW electricity generation unit each, which uses the wells combustion gas to supply power, which is being fed into the national electricity grid.

In 2017, total revenue for electricity production was $120 million (RON 505.81 million), representing a 38 percent increase in total income compared to 2016.

== Social responsibility and sustainability ==
Since 2007, Romgaz has been supporting the only international chess competition in Romania. The contest is called the "Kings Tournament" and is currently in its seventh edition. It has been included in the Grand Slam Chess Association Chess Tournament series for three years. Romgaz and UNICEF partnered to launch the "Let's go to school" campaign in Romania in 2015, aiming to prevent and reduce school absenteeism, dropout and early school leaving.
