= Transylvanian Plateau =

Plateau in Romania

Coordinates: 46°30′N 24°30′E

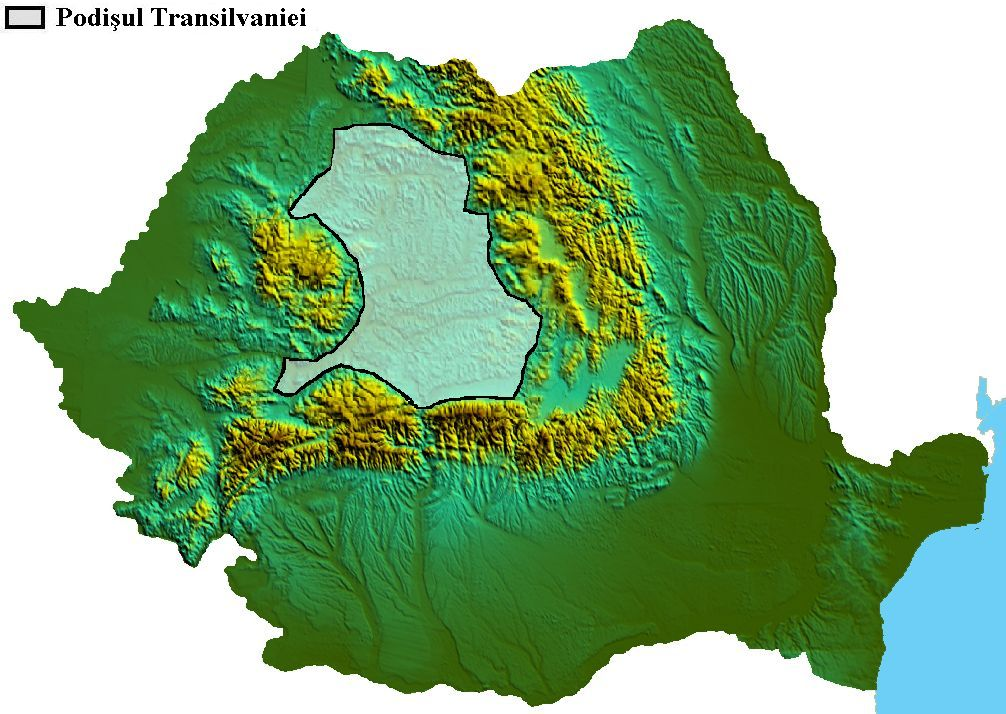
The Transylvanian Plateau

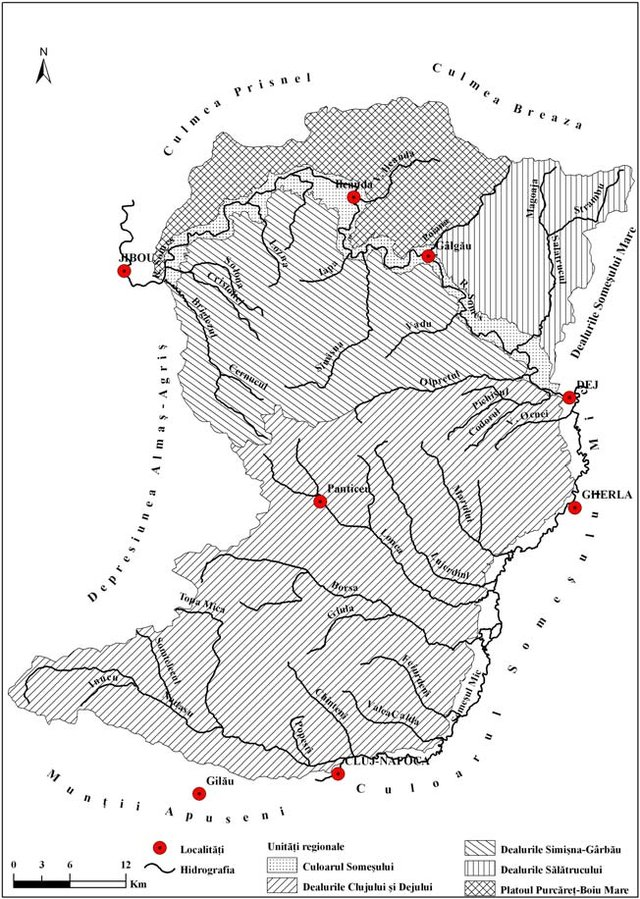
The Someș Plateau

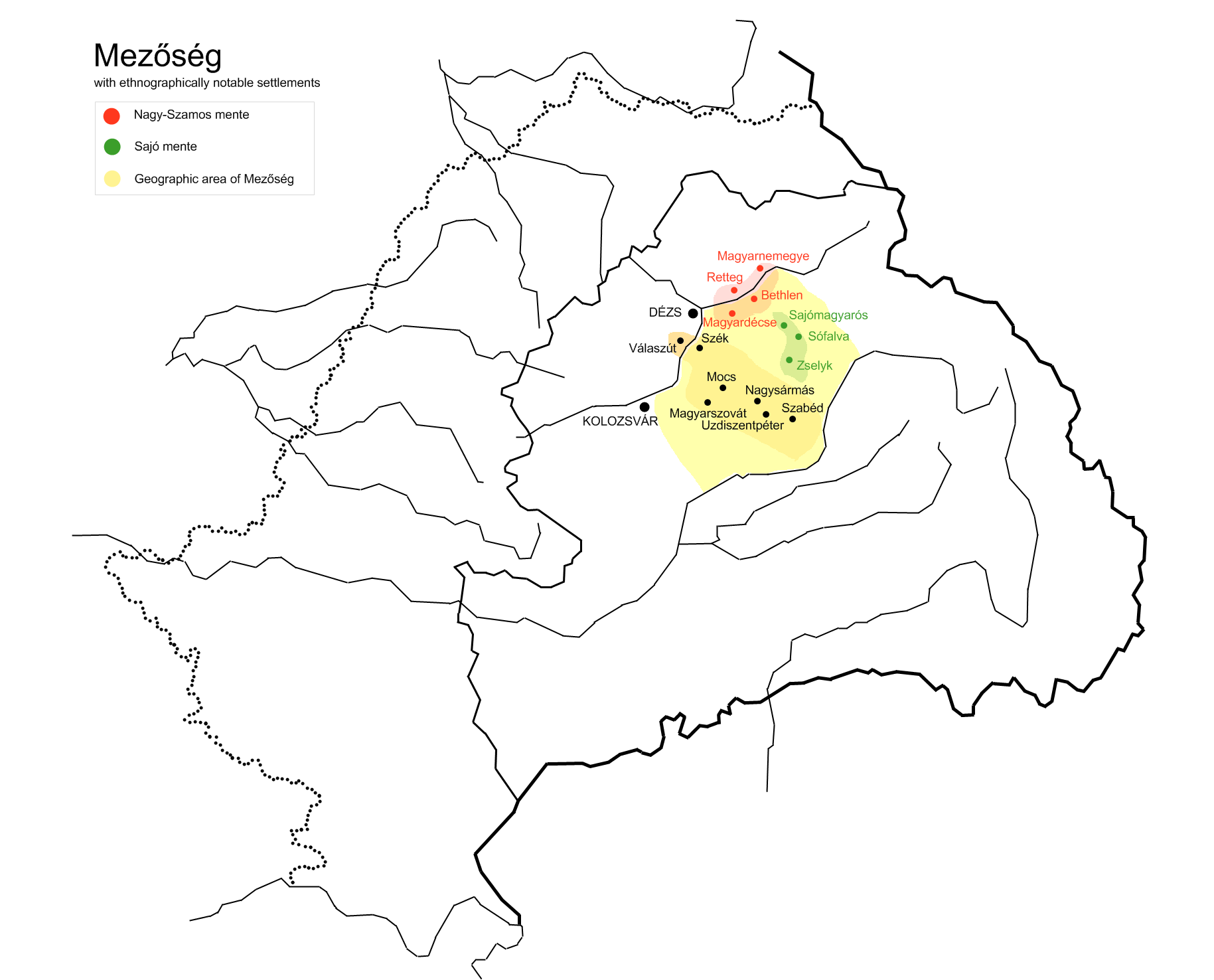
The Transylvanian Plain

The Transylvanian Plateau (Romanian: Podișul Transilvaniei; Hungarian: Erdélyi-medence) is a plateau in central Romania.

== Description ==
The plateau lies within and takes its name from the historical region of Transylvania, and is almost entirely surrounded by the Eastern, Southern and Romanian Western branches of the Carpathian Mountains. The area includes the Transylvanian Plain.

It is improperly called a plateau, for it does not possess extensive plains, but is formed of a network of valleys of various size, ravines and canyons, united together by numerous small mountain ranges, which attain a height of 150–250 m (490–820 ft) above the altitude of the valley.

== Relief features ==
The plateau consists of two relatively concentric areas.

- Towards the outside of the area, there is a folded structure (more pronounced in the east and slightly weaker in the south and west). In contact with the submontane structures, this forms an area of submontane depressions in the west and south, and a sequence of depressions and hills similar to the Subcarpathians in the east.This marginal area is therefore formed of submontane depressions (Huedin, Almaș-Agrij, Iara, Bistrița, Vălenii de Mureș, Gurghiu, Sovata-Praid, Odorhei, Homoroadelor, Hoghiz, Făgăraș, Sibiu), intercolline (Dumitra, Voivodeni, Măgherani-Atid, Cristuru Secuiesc), depression areas (Orăștie, Alba Iulia – Turda) and hills (relatively isolated hilly areas – in the west and units such as the Bistrița Hills, Culmea Șieului, the Transylvanian Subcarpathians – in the east).
- In the center, there is a plateau area (the Transylvanian Plateau) with quasi-horizontal or soft structures that are vaulted in places in the form of domes. The central area consists of the Someșan Plateau, the Transylvanian Plain (with a hilly landscape and typical hill elevations, it is called a "plain" due to its agricultural land use) and the Târnavelor Plateau (with the subunits of the Târnavelor Plateau itself and the Hârtibaciului Plateau, together with the Secașelor Plateau in the south).

== Climate features ==
The plateau has a continental climate. Temperature varies a great deal in the course of a year, with warm summers contrasted by very cold winters. Vast forests cover parts of the plateau and the mountains. The mean elevation is 300–500 m (980–1,640 ft).

Climatic features are determined by the difference in altitude between the central and marginal parts and the different exposure to air mass circulation.

In the western part, there is a rain shadow with foehn influences, with higher temperatures and low precipitation. The eastern part is favorably exposed to air masses.

Two biopedoclimatic areas can be identified:

1. Central-western part – low slopes on the eastern side of the Apuseni Mountains. Temperatures: 8-9°C, higher in the Alba Corridor and Turda area. Precipitation: 600-700 mm/year, lower in the Alba and Turda areas. Vegetation associations: steppe, forest-steppe, forest, heavily modified by humans, replaced by agricultural crops, orchards, vineyards.

2. High marginal areas – Temperatures: 7-8°C. Precipitation: 700-800 mm/year. Better preserved forest vegetation. Clay-illuvial and intrazonal (lithomorphic) soils.

== Subdivisions ==
The Transylvanian Plateau is divided into three areas:

- Someș Plateau (Podișul Someșan or Podișul Someșelor); the northern part.
- Transylvanian Plain (Câmpia Transilvaniei); the central part.
- Târnava Plateau (Podișul Târnavelor); the southern part.

The Transylvanian Plain is also hilly (400–600 m), but because the area is almost completely cultivated it is called a plain.

== The Transylvanian Basin ==
The Transylvanian Basin (Romanian: Depresiunea colinară a Transilvaniei) includes the Transylvanian Plateau and the peripheral areas towards the Carpathian Mountains, which have a different character than the plateau. The basin is the main production site of Romania's methane. It also contains a salt dome.

== See also ==
- Romanian Carpathians
