= Alexander Medvedev =

Deputy chairman of the board of executive directors of Gazprom

- Александр Медведев
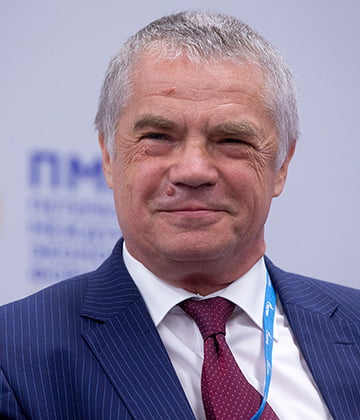
- Medvedev in 2019
- Born: 14 August 1955 (age 70); Shakhtyorsk, Russian Soviet Federative Socialist Republic, Soviet Union
- Occupation: President of the FC Zenit Saint Petersburg

Alexander Ivanovich Medvedev (Russian: Александр Иванович Медведев, Aleksandr Ivanovich Medvedev; born 14 August 1955) is the current Deputy Chairman of the Management Committee of Russian energy company Gazprom and since February 2019 he is the director general and president of the football club Zenit, Saint Petersburg.

Medvedev also served as Director-General of Gazprom's export arm Gazprom Export from 2006 until 2014. He is a member of the Coordination Committee of RosUkrEnergo and a member of the shareholders' committee of Nord Stream AG, and was the first president of the Kontinental Hockey League (KHL), serving from 2008 until his resignation in 2014.

== Background ==
In 1978, he graduated from the Moscow Institute of Physics and Technology. From 1978 to 1989 he worked at the Institute of World Economy and International Relations. In 1989–1991 he was a director of the Soviet owned Donau Bank AG in Vienna and a managing director of bank's subsidiary company Inter Trade Consult GmbH. There are speculations that he had an undercover KGB job because he worked at Donau Bank at the same time as Andrei Akimov, another KGB officer and now Gazprombank's chief.

From 1991 to 1996 and from 1998 to 2002 he was director of the Austrian IMAG Investment Management & Advisory Group GmbH. Between 1997 and 1998 he was a vice president of the Eastern oil company (Восточная нефтяная компания) in Moscow. Since August 2002, Medvedev is the Director-General of Gazprom Export (former Gazeksport) and the Deputy Chairman of the Board of Executive Directors of Gazprom.

Between 2008 and 2014, Alexander Medvedev served as president of the Kontinental Hockey League. He is also the president of SKA Saint Petersburg hockey club and Russia's representative to the International Ice Hockey Federation Council.

In December 2008, The New York Times reported that at one point Medvedev predicted Gazprom's market value would reach $1 trillion by 2014.

In 2009, Medvedev stated an interest in acquiring one of three unspecified NHL franchises. In May, he claimed that his representatives spoke with NHL Deputy Commissioner Bill Daly, who refused to accept Russian ownership in the league. Daly denied ever being in contact with Medvedev and asserted that the NHL does not discriminate on the basis of nationality among its prospective team owners.

Medvedev has played key roles in Gazprom's opaque intermediaries such as RosUkrEnergo, Centrex Group, Gazprom Germania, and YugoRosGaz.
