= List of Gazprom subsidiaries =

Russian energy company Gazprom has several hundred subsidiaries and affiliated companies owned and controlled directly or indirectly. The subsidiaries and affiliated companies are listed by country. The list is incomplete.

In January 2025, Gazprom had to relinquish its 51% ownership of Naftna industrija Srbije due to sanctions surrounding the Russo-Ukrainian War.

== Russia ==
=== 100% ownership ===
- Gazprom Dobycha Astrakhan
- Gazprom Transgaz Ufa
- Burgaz
- Gazpromexport
- Gazflot
- Gazkomplektimpex
- Gaznadzor
- Gazobezopasnost
- Gazprom Dobycha Shelf Yuzhnosakhalinsk - Shtokman has been fired
- Gazpromavia
- Gazpromenergo
- Gazprominvestarena
- Gazprominvest
- Gazpromokhrana
- Gazpromrazvitiye
- Gazpromstroyengineering
- Gazsvyaz
- Gazprom Inform
- Gazprom Dobycha Irkutsk
- Gazprom Transgaz Makhachkala
- Gazprom Transgaz Stavropol
- Gazprom Transgaz Krasnodar
- Gazprom Dobycha Krasnodar
- Lentransgaz
- Mostransgaz
- Mezhregiongaz
- Nadymgazprom
- Nadymstroygazdobycha
- NIIgazekonomika
- Novy Urengoy Gas Chemicals Company
- Gazprom Dobycha Noyabrsk
- Science & Production Center Podzemgidromineral
- Orenburggazprom
- Permtransgaz
- Podzemgazprom
- Rosneftechim
- Samaratransgaz
- Severgazprom
- Severneftegazprom - holder of the licenses to develop the Yuzhno-Russkoye field
- Sevmorneftegaz - holder of the licenses to develop the Shtokman and Prirazlomnoye fields
- Surgutgazprom
- Szhizhenny gaz
- Tattransgaz
- Temryukmortrans
- Tomsktransgaz
- TyumenNIIgiprogaz
- Tyumentransgaz
- Uraltransgaz
- Urengoygazprom
- Volgogradtransgaz
- Volgotransgaz
- VNIIGAZ
- Yamalgazinvest
- Yamburggazdobycha
- Yugtransgaz

=== Ownership over 50% ===
- Dialoggazservice
- Ditangaz
- Electrogaz
- FC Zenit Saint Petersburg (76%) - football club who plays in Russian Premier League
- Fora Gazprom
- Future Fatherland Fund
- Gazenergoservice
- Gazprom Space Systems
- Gazmash
- Gazprombank
- Gazpromgeofizika
- Gazprom Neft
  - Fakel
- GazpromPurInvest
- Gazpromtrubinvest
- Gazprom YRGM Trading (100% - 1 share owned by BASF) - gas trader for purchasing gas from Sevmorneftegaz
- Gaztelekom
- Giprogaztsentr
- Giprospetsgaz
- Krasnoyarskgazprom
- Orgenergogaz
- Gazprom Promgaz
- SeverEnergia
- SevKavNIPIgaz
- Sibur
- Tsentrenergogaz
- Tsentrgaz
- VNIPIgazdobycha
- Volgogaz
- Volgogradneftemash
- Vostokgazprom
- Zapsibgazprom
- Zarubezhneftegaz

=== Ownership 50% or less ===
- Achimgaz (50%) - joint venture with BASF
- Caspian Oil Company
- GazAgroFriport
- Gaztransit
- Gaz-Truby
- Horizon Investment Company
- Mosenergo (49.9%)
- Novatek (19.9%)
- Prometey-Sochi
- RNKB Usmanovoil
- Rosneftegazstroy
- Rosshelf
- SOGAZ (100% before 2004)
- Stroytransgaz
- TsentrKaspneftegaz (50%) - joint venture with Lukoil to develop Tsentralnaya field in the Caspian Sea (jointly with KazMunayGas)
- Tyumen Hotel
- Vega Investment Company
- VIP-Premier
- Vologdapromresurs
- YuzhNIIGiprogaz
- Zavod TBD

== Armenia ==
- Gazprom Armenia (100%)

== Austria ==
- ARosgas Holding AG (100%) - gas marketing
- Centrex Europe Energy & Gas AG (100%) - owned through Gazprombank
- GHW (50%) - joint venture with OMV for gas trading
- Sibneft Oil Trade GmbH (100%) - oil trading company owned through Gazprom Neft
- Vienna Capital Partners (???%) - financial advisor and investor
- ZGG-Zarubezhgazneftechim Trading GmbH (100%) - 0gas trading company
- ZMB Gasspeicher Holding GmbH (66.67%) - 33.3% owned by Centrex Europe Energy & Gas AG

== Belarus ==
- Belgazprombank (50%)
- Gazprom Transgaz Belarus (100%)

== Bulgaria ==
- Topenergo (100%) - gas trading and transport

== Cayman Islands ==
- ZGG Cayman Holding Ltd. (100%) - investment company
- ZGG Cayman Ltd (100%) - investment company

== Cyprus ==
- Ecofran Marketing Consulting & Communication Services Company Limited
- GASEXCO Gas Exploration Company Ltd.
- Greatham Overseas Limited
- Private Company Limited by Shares GPBI (Cyprus) Ltd.
- Leadville Investments Ltd (100%) - investment company
- MF Media Finance (Overseas) Limited
- Odex Exploration Ltd. (20%) - oil exploration
- NTV World Ltd. - media company
- Siritia Ventures Ltd. - investment company

== Czech Republic ==
- Gas-Invest S.A. (37.5%)
- Vemex s.r.o. (Securing Energy for Europe owns 51%)

== Estonia ==
- Eesti Gaas AS (37.02%)

== France ==
- Frangaz (50%) - joint venture with Gaz de France

== Germany ==
- Agrogaz GmbH (100%)
- Centrex Beteiligungs GmbH (38%) - gas trading and investment company
- Ditgaz (49%)
- VNG - Verbundnetz Gas AG (5.3%) - gas transportation and marketing
- Wingas GmbH (100%) - joint venture with Wintershall, the subsidiary of BASF, for gas trading
- astora GmbH (50%) - joint venture with Wintershall, the subsidiary of BASF, for gas storage
- GASCADE GmbH (50%) - joint venture with Wintershall, the subsidiary of BASF, for gas transportation
- Wintershall Erdgas Handelshaus GmbH & Co. KG (50%) - joint venture with Wintershall for gas trading
- НТВ Europa GmbH
- Bleakend Holdings Limited

== Greece ==
- Prometheus Gas (50%) - joint company with Copelouzos Group

== Hungary ==
- Panrusgáz (40%) - trading and transport of natural gas
- Borsodchem (25%) - petrochemicals
- TVK (13.5%)
- DKG-EAST Co (38.1%) - oil and gas equipment manufacturing
- Gazkomplekt KFT
- NTV Hungary Commercial Limited Liability Company

== Iraq ==
- Gazprom Neft Badra B.V.
- Gazprom Neft Garmian B.V.

== Ireland ==
- GPB Finance Plc. - investment company

== Israel ==
- N.T.V. Global Network (Israel) Ltd.

== Italy ==
- Promgas (100%) - joint venture with ENI
- Volta SpA (49%) - joint venture with Edison S.p.A.

== Kazakhstan ==
- KazRosGaz (50%) - joint venture with KazMunayGas

== Kyrgyzstan ==
- Gazprom Kyrgyzstan (100%)

== Latvia ==
- Latvijas Gāze (34%)

== Liechtenstein ==
- IDF Anlagegesellschaft - investment company (holding via Siritia Ventures Ltd., Cyprus)

== Lithuania ==
- Stella Vitae (30%)

== Moldova ==
- Moldovagaz (50%+1) plus 13.44% through debt shares of Tiraspoltransgaz

== Netherlands ==
- Brochan B.V.
- BSPS B.V. (50%) - operator of the Blue Stream pipeline
- Gazinvest Finance B.V.
- Gazprom Finance B.V.
- Gazprom EP International B.V. (100%)
- Gazprom Sakhalin Holdings B.V. - owns 50%+1 share in Sakhalin Energy, the operator of the Sakhalin-II oil and gas field
- NTV Plus B.V.
- NTV-НТВ Holding and Finance B.V
- PeterGaz B.V.
- Sib Finance B.V.
- West East Pipeline Project Investment (100%) - construction and investment company

== Nigeria ==
- Nigaz (50%) - joint venture with the Nigerian National Petroleum Corporation

== Poland ==
- EuRoPol Gaz (48%) - operator of the Polish section of Yamal-Europe pipeline registered name: SYSTEM GAZOCIĄGÓW TRANZYTOWYCH "EUROPOL GAZ" SPÓŁKA AKCYJNA
- Gas Trading (18.4%) - gas trading (exact name not found in registers) registered name: WARSAW GAS TRADING SPÓŁKA Z OGRANICZONĄ ODPOWIEDZIALNOŚCIĄ

== Romania ==
- WIEE Romania SRL (50%) - gas distribution
- WIROM Gas S.A. (2&%) - gas trading, controlled through WIEH

== Serbia ==
- YugoRosGaz (50%) - gas trading and transport
- Progress Gas (50%) - gas trading

== Slovakia ==
- Slovenský plynárenský priemysel - 49% shares are owned by Slovak Gas Holding B.V., a consortium of Gaz de France and E.ON Ruhrgas Gazprom was part of consortium winning the privatisation of Slovenský plynárenský priemysel, but hasn't never entered the company.
- Slovrusgaz (50%) - gas trading and transport

== Slovenia ==
- Tagdem (7.6%) - gas trading

== Switzerland ==
- Baltic LNG AG (80%) - joint venture with Sovkomflot for the development and sale of LNG
- Gas Project Development Central Asia AG (50%) - joint venture with Centrex Gas & Energy Europe AG
- Nord Stream AG (51%) - joint project company with E.ON, BASF and Gasunie for the contraction and operation of the Nord Stream 1 pipeline
- RosUkrEnergo AG (50%) - gas trading in Ukraine
- Shtokman Development AG (51%) - joint project company with Total S.A. (25%) and Statoil (24%) to develop Shtokman gas field first phase
- Sibur-Europe (100%) - investment company
- South Stream AG (50%) - joint project company with Eni for the contraction and operation of the South Stream pipeline
- Wintershall Erdgas Handelshaus Zug AG (WIEE) (50%) - gas trading
- ZMB (Schweiz) AG (100%) - gas trading

== Turkey ==
- Bosphorus Gaz Corporation AS - Securing Energy for Europe owns 71%
- Turusgaz (45%) - a joint venture with BOTAS

== Ukraine ==
- YuzhNIIgiprogaz

== United Kingdom ==
- Gazprom UK Ltd (100%)- investment company
- Gazprom Marketing and Trading Limited (GM&T) (100%) - energy trading
- HydroWingas (25%) - gas trading
- Interconnector (UK) Limited (10%) - operator of the Interconnector pipeline
- Sibur International (100%) - petrochemicals
- WINGAS Storage UK Ltd. (33%) - underground gas storage reconstruction

== British Virgin Islands ==
- Benton Solutions Inc.
- Media Financial Limited
- Nagelfar Trade & Invest Ltd.
- NTV Media International Limited
- Sib Oil Trade (100%) - oil trading
