= Nik Storonsky =

British tech businessman (born 1984)

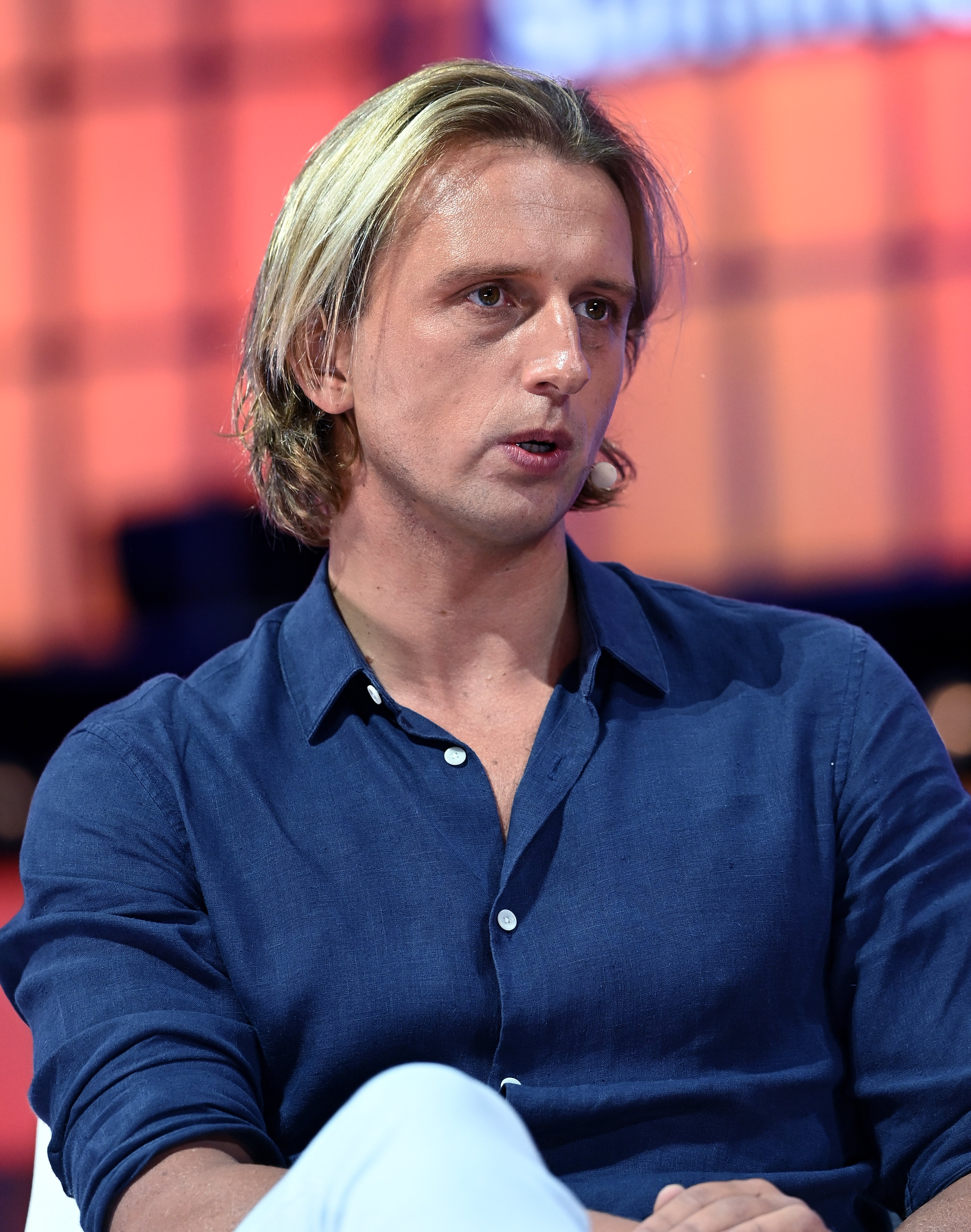
- Storonskiy in 2022
- Born: Nikolay Nikolayevich Storonsky; 21 July 1984 (age 42); Dolgoprudny, Russian SFSR, Soviet Union
- Citizenship: United Kingdom; Russia (until 2022)
- Occupation: Businessman
- Children: 4

Nikolay Nikolayevich Storonsky (born 21 July 1984) is a Russian and British billionaire entrepreneur and technology executive. He is the co-founder and CEO of Revolut, and the founder of venture capital firm QuantumLight.

== Early life and career ==
Nikolay Nikolayevich Storonsky was born on 21 July 1984 in Dolgoprudny, in what was then the Russian SFSR of the Soviet Union.

As a child, he took up boxing and swimming, later becoming a state champion during his university years. He began reading books on economics and business at the age of six.

He completed a master's degree in general and applied physics at the Moscow Institute of Physics and Technology in 2007. The same year, he also earned a master's degree in applied economics and finance from the New Economic School.

Storonsky moved to England in 2006 to begin his career as an equity derivatives trader at Lehman Brothers in London, and later joined Credit Suisse, where he remained until 2013.

In 2023, Storonsky founded the venture capital firm QuantumLight. The fund uses a proprietary AI platform, Aleph, to analyse startups and identify potential investments, typically targeting later-stage companies with proven traction. By 2025, QuantumLight had raised approximately US$250 million.

Since 2023, Storonsky's family office has been developing a network of luxury villas and resort properties under the name Utopia. The venture focuses on high-end holiday destinations for kite-surfers and surfers in countries such as Spain, Brazil and the Dominican Republic.

== Revolut ==
Storonsky founded Revolut Ltd in December 2013 and was also the company's first investor, contributing about £300,000 of his own savings to launch the project. The idea for the company arose from fees and commissions he encountered while traveling, leading to an initial concept of a multi-currency card with fair exchange rates. Several months later, he invited software engineer Vlad Yatsenko, formerly of Deutsche Bank, to join as CTO; Yatsenko later became Revolut's co-founder. A first prototype was completed in early 2015, and the app launched publicly in July 2015.

In 2017, Revolut obtained an e-money license in the United Kingdom. Following Brexit, the company secured an additional e-money license from the Bank of Lithuania in 2018 and, in 2019, was granted a restricted banking license in Lithuania.

In 2021, Revolut became the most valuable fintech firm in the UK.

As of 2022, Revolut became a fully licensed bank under the authorisation of the European Central Bank. On 12 July 2024, Revolut was granted a UK banking license with restrictions by the Prudential Regulation Authority and the Financial Conduct Authority. As of 2025, the company remains in the mobilisation phase, during which it must demonstrate operational readiness before launching full banking operations in the UK.

The company was valued at $45 billion as of August 2024. As of November 2024, the company has 50 million customers globally and more than 10,000 employees.

In May 2025, Revolut announced plans to apply for a full banking licence in France as part of its Western European expansion strategy. It has also explored entering the United States banking market, either through the acquisition of a regulated institution or by applying for a national banking charter.

The company was valued at $75 billion during a $3 billion fundraising round in October 2025, making it the most valuable private company in Europe and 8th most valuable private company in the world.

On 27 January 2026, Revolut launched full banking operations in Mexico. Revolut capitalized its operations with over $100 million, which was more than double the regulatory minimum.

On 11 March 2026, Revolut announced that they have received their full UK banking license, which means that customers will now be protected by the Financial Services Compensation Scheme on any deposits under £120,000. The licence also authorises the company to provide consumer credit services to UK customers.

== Net worth and recognitions ==
In 2020, Storonsky was included in Fortune magazine's 40 Under 40 list in the finance category and in The Telegraph's Tech Hot 100. In 2024, he was named to the TIME100 Next list published by Time.

Storonsky first appeared on the Forbes Billionaires List in 2020, with an estimated net worth of US$1.1 billion. In 2024, he was included in The Sunday Times Rich List, ranking among the 50 wealthiest people in the United Kingdom, with an estimated fortune of £6.98 billion. In the 2026 Forbes list, following the continued growth of Revolut, Storonsky was ranked 149th globally, with an estimated net worth of US$18.8 billion.

As of December 2025, he held an ownership stake of 29% in Revolut following changes to the company's incentive structure. According to reporting by the Financial Times and The Bell, the long-term incentive package could award him up to an additional 10% of the company's shares should Revolut reach a valuation of $200 billion.

== Criticism ==
Former employees and media reports have described tensions between Revolut's leadership and its compliance staff. A 2016 whistleblower complaint to the UK Financial Conduct Authority raised concerns about weaknesses in the company's anti-money-laundering and sanctions controls. Revolut later stated that the issues had been addressed in coordination with the relevant regulators.

Storonsky's management style during Revolut's period of rapid growth has drawn criticism. Reports from 2018 and 2019 described a demanding, high-pressure work environment marked by long hours, ambitious targets and high staff turnover. Some former employees characterised the culture as "intense" or "aggressive". In a 2019 report, Wired cited accounts from former employees describing unpaid work, unachievable targets, and high staff turnover during the company's rapid expansion. Storonsky later acknowledged that Revolut had made mistakes and stated that the company had since improved its internal culture.

In November 2025, Revolut faced criticism for freezing the accounts of Russian expatriates living in Europe, a measure it said was taken to comply with the latest EU sanctions against Russia. Storonsky attributed the policy to strict regulatory expectations and the difficulty of verifying temporary residence permits, noting that the impossibility of navigating global banking regulations with a Russian passport was a primary reason he had renounced his citizenship in 2022.

In October 2025, The Independent reported that Storonsky had changed his official residence from the UK to the United Arab Emirates amid a broader exodus of wealthy UK residents following the government's move to abolish the "non-domiciled" tax status. Tax Policy Associates estimated that the move could reduce his exposure to future UK capital gains taxes by more than £3 billion. In December 2025, the Financial Times reported that Revolut had not informed UK regulators in advance of a Companies House filing that listed Storonsky as a UAE resident, a move that raised concerns with the Financial Conduct Authority, the Bank of England and the Treasury while the company was awaiting a full UK banking licence. It was subsequently reported that the filing had been amended to record him as a UK resident once more, with the earlier UAE entry attributed to an "administrative error".

== Personal life ==
Storonsky is married and has four children.

In March 2022, Storonsky condemned the Russian invasion of Ukraine. In an open letter, he also pledged that Revolut would match, for a limited time, every donation made to the Red Cross in solidarity with the victims of the war. In late October 2022, The Telegraph reported that he had renounced his Russian citizenship earlier that year.

His father, Nikolay Mironovich Storonsky, is a Ukrainian-born physicist and engineer from Lviv. He graduated from the Moscow Institute of Physics and Technology and worked as a senior research fellow at VNIIGAZ, Gazprom's principal scientific research centre for gas technologies. From 1999 to 2019, he served as deputy general director for science at Gazprom Promgaz, and in December 2019 he became its chief executive officer.

He is a kite surfer and a mountaineer in his spare time.

In 2019, Storonsky purchased a residence in West London for approximately US$25 million.
