= Novodachnaya railway station =

Railway station in Moscow, Russia

Novodachnaya Новодачная
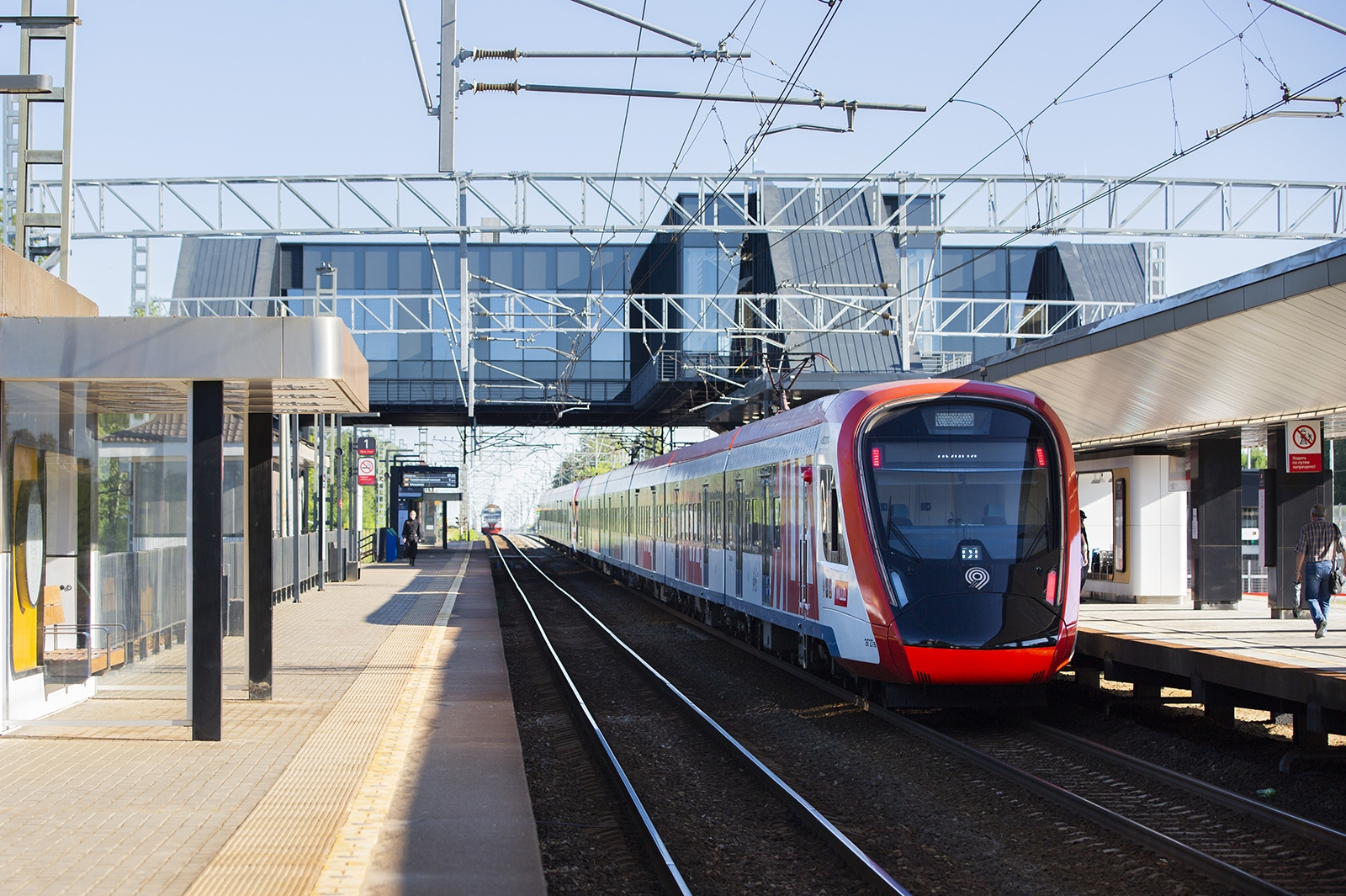

General information
- Location: Dolgoprudny, Moscow Oblast; Russia
- Coordinates: 55.9245°N 37.5279°E
- System: Moscow Railway platform
- Owner: Russian Railways
- Operator: Moscow Railway
- Platforms: 2 (Island platform)
- Tracks: 2

History
- Opened: 1964
- Rebuilt: 2020

Services
| Preceding station | Moscow Central Diameters | Following station |
|---|---|---|
| Mark towards Odintsovo | Line D1 | Dolgoprudnaya towards Lobnya |
Route map
Location

Novodachnaya is a railway station of Line D1 of the Moscow Central Diameters in Dolgoprudny, Moscow Oblast. It was opened in 1964 and rebuilt in 2020.

== Gallery ==
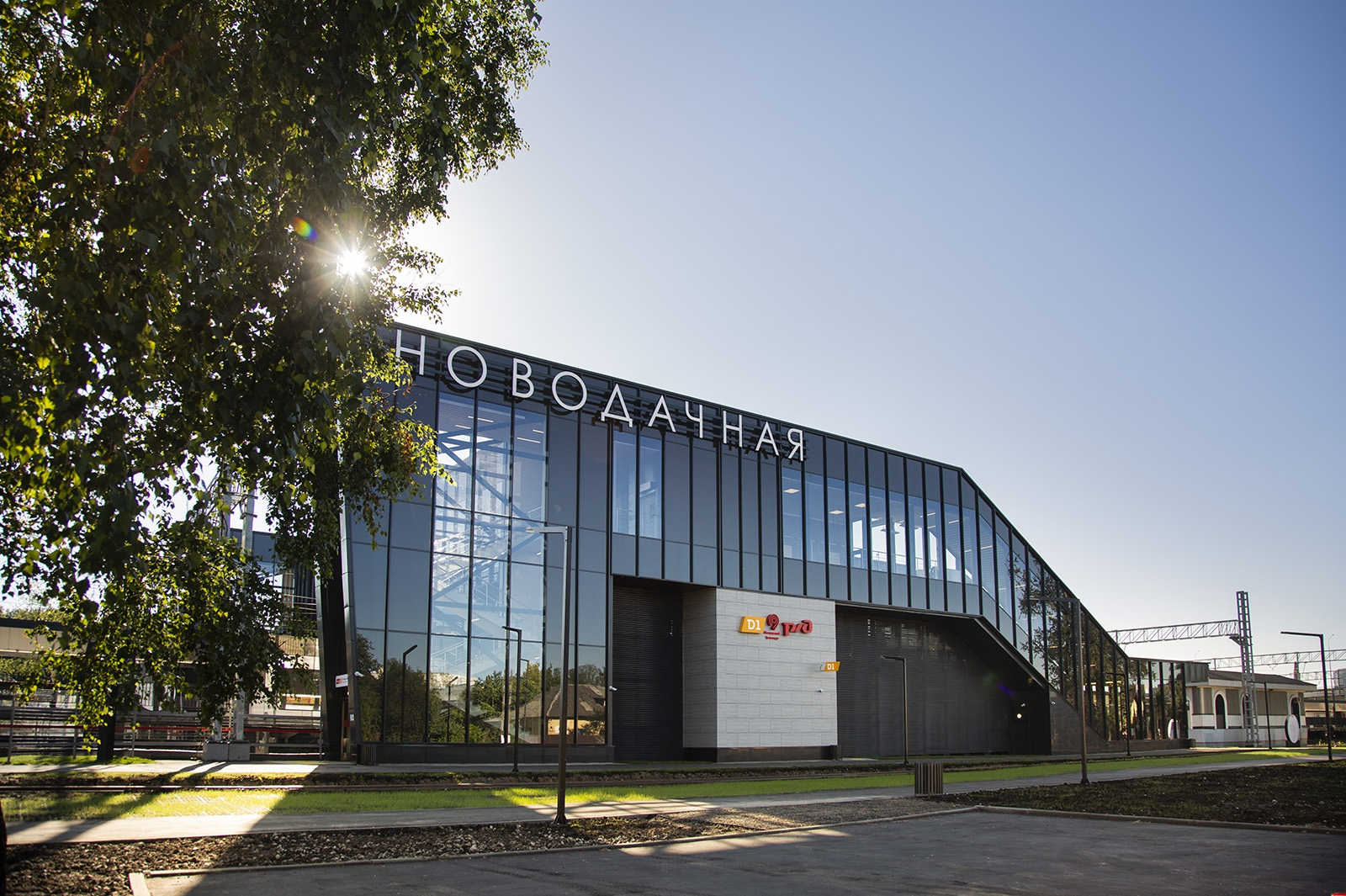

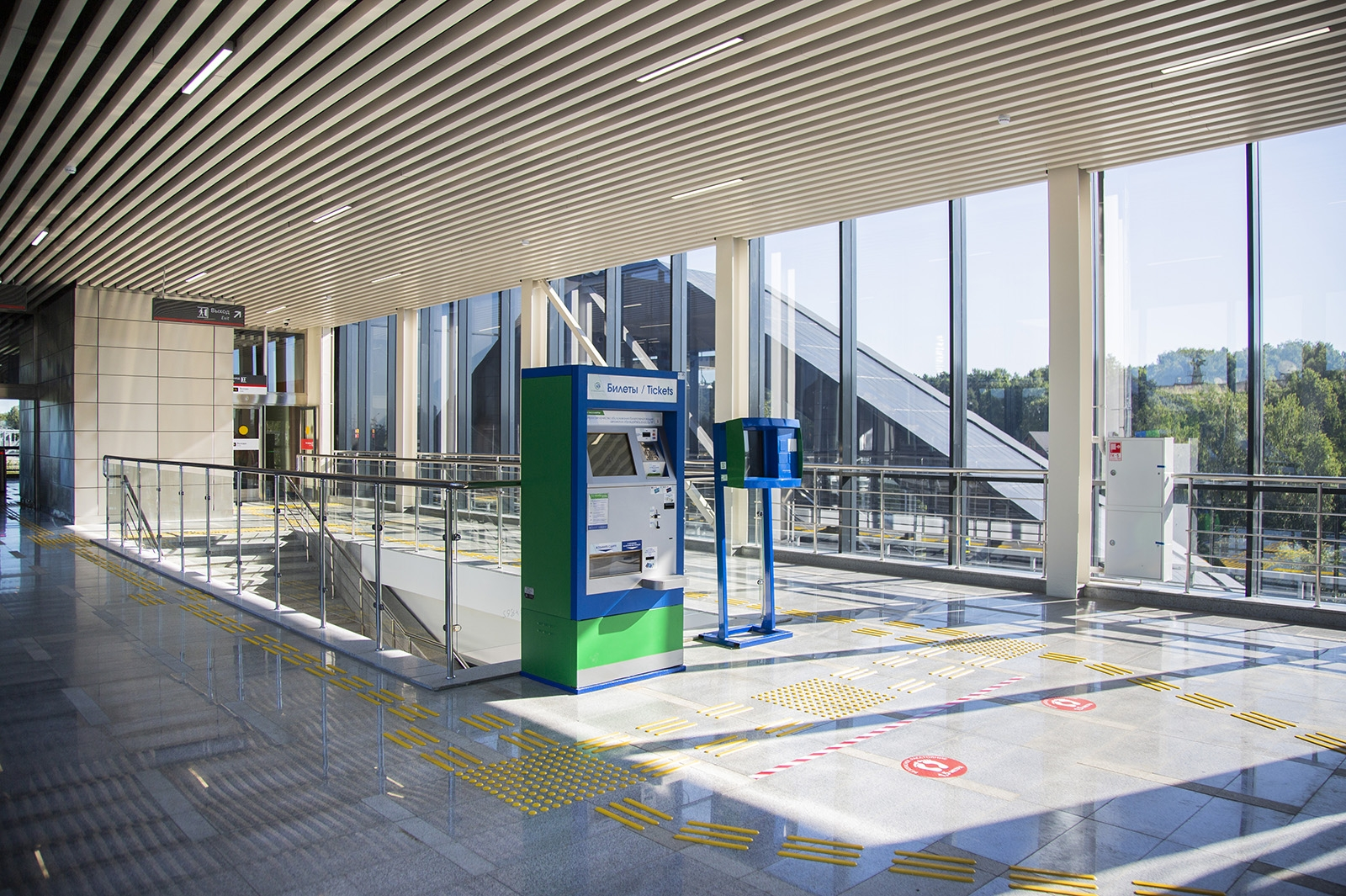

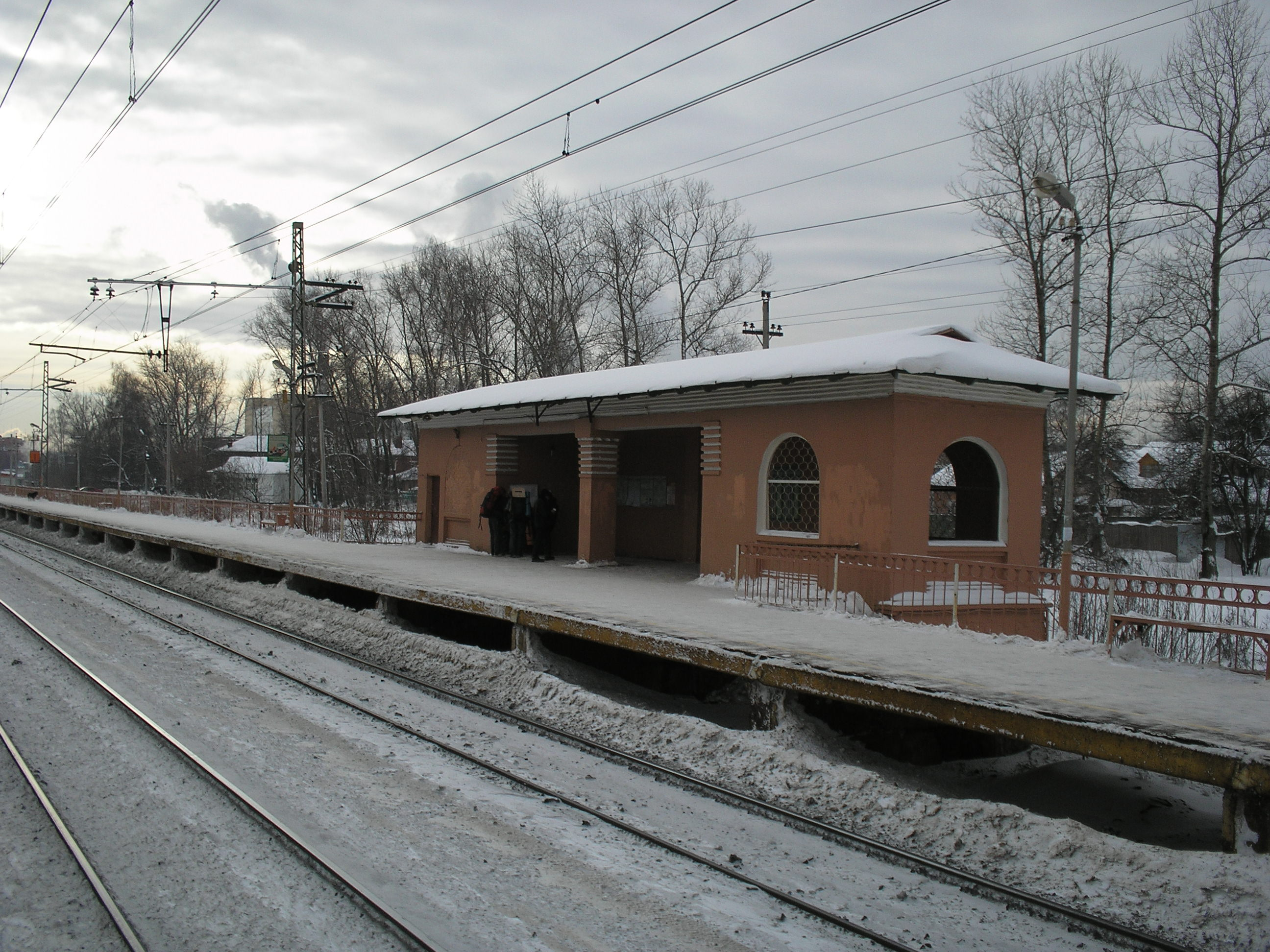
Novodachnaya railway station in 2007.
