= Vemex =

Natural gas trading company in the Czech Republic

Vemex s.r.o.
- Company type: Private
- Industry: Oil and gas
- Founded: 2001
- Headquarters: Prague, Czech Republic
- Key people: Vladimir Ermakov (CEO)
- Products: Natural gas
- Services: Distribution of natural gas
- Revenue: 0 Czech koruna (2019)
- Operating income: 45,099,000 Czech koruna (2019)
- Net income: 23,284,000 Czech koruna (2019)
- Total assets: 1,702,000 Czech koruna (2019)
- Number of employees: 2 (2019)
- Parent: Gazprom
- Subsidiaries: VEMEX Energie a.s.
- Website: www.vemex.cz

Vemex is a Gazprom-controlled natural gas trading company in the Czech Republic. In addition to the Czech Republic, the company also operates in Slovakia.

The shareholders of Vemex are:

- Securing Energy for Europe GmbH (Germany) - 67%
- Centrex Europe Energy & Gas AG (Austria) - 33%

Vemex has around 10–12% of the Czech gas market. The major clients are the Prague gas utility Pražská plynárenská, the Spolana chemical producer, and the steel manufacturer Vitkovice.

In 2007, Vemex signed a five-year contract with Gazprom for annual deliveries up to 500 million cubic metres of gas. Together with the Czech natural gas producer MND, a shareholder of Vemex itself, the company plans to build a natural gas storage facility in the eastern part of the Czech Republic. As of 2013 the plat is still active.

In 2010, the company announced its plan to enter the Slovak market through its subsidiary Vemex Energo, s.r.o. In September 2009, the company announced it would like to lease a part of Ukrainian underground storage capacities.

Dutch MND Group B.V. transferred 16.86% shares to Swiss MND Group AG in 2019 and then MND Group AG in 2020 transferred all shares to German Securing Energy for Europe GmbH, the former Gazprom Germania GmbH.

== See also ==
- Energy in the Czech Republic
- List of Gazprom subsidiaries
