= Žarko Zečević =

Serbian retired basketball player, former football administrator, and current businessman

Personal information
- Born: January 19, 1950 (age 76) Belgrade, PR Serbia, FPR Yugoslavia

Career information
- Playing career: 1966–1977
- Position: Center

Career history
- 1966–1977: Partizan
Medals
Men's basketball
Representing Yugoslavia
Mediterranean Games
Gold medal – first place	1971 Izmir	Team
European Championship for Juniors
Silver medal – second place	1968 Spain	Team

Žarko Zečević (Serbian Cyrillic: Жарко Зечевић; born 19 January 1950) is a Serbian retired basketball player, former football administrator, and current businessman.

Known by his widely used nickname Zeka, he is most notable as the controversial and all powerful general-secretary of FK Partizan, a role he performed for more than two decades. Since 2007, he is employed at YugoRosGaz, a subsidiary of Gazprom.

Born to father Slavko Zečević (former Police Minister and former FK Partizan managing board member) Žarko's entire sports career, both playing and administrative, is also tied to Partizan Sports Society. During the late 1960s and 1970s, he was a basketball player for KK Partizan and even managed 16 appearances in the Yugoslavia national basketball team jersey, though only in friendly preparation games and minor competitions - he never made the final cut for any of the major competitions (Eurobasket, World Championships, and the Olympics).

== Personal ==
Žarko Zečević was married to Mira who used to work as marketing director at Politika daily newspaper during the 1990s. They have a son and a daughter.

Zečević's sister is married to Danko Đunić, former Partizan Sports Society president.

Preceded by Špiro Sinovčić	General secretary of FK Partizan; 1985–2007	Succeeded by Gordan Petrić
