= Rovshan Khalilov =

Azerbaijani powerlifter

Personal information
- Born: Rovshan Magsad ogly Khalilov; 8 November 1990 (age 35) Mingachevir, Azerbaijan
- Height: 5 ft 6 in (1.68 m)
- Weight: 75 kg (165 lb)

Sport
- Sport: Powerlifting & Strongman competitor
Medal record
Powerlifting
Representing Azerbaijan
World championship
1st	2017 Russia
1st	2018 Russia
1st	2018 USA
1st	2019 Russia
1st	2019 Russia
Europe championship
1st	2013 Azerbaijan
1st	2019 Russia
1st	2019 Russia
Heydar Aliyev International Tournament
1st	2017 Azerbaijan
1st	2018 Azerbaijan
1st	2019 Azerbaijan
Strongman
Representing Azerbaijan
Azerbaijan Championship
1st	2020 Azerbaijan

Rovshan Magsad ogly Khalilov (Azerbaijani: Xəlilov Rövşən Məqsəd oğlu; born November 8, 1990) is an Azerbaijani powerlifter and strongman competitor, Honored Master of Sports of Azerbaijan, Master of Sports of International Class, eleven-time champion of Azerbaijan, five-time world and three-time European champion.

== Biography ==
Born on November 5, 1990, in the Azerbaijani city of Mingachevir. Since 2016, he has been an employee of the Special Risk Rescue Service of the Ministry of Emergency Situations. He first worked in the special risk rescue service as a security guard with the rank of ensign, and since 2018 as a rescue specialist. In 2020, he was promoted to the rank of lieutenant, given his success in sports and business.

In 1997-2008 he studied at the secondary school No. 1 in Mingachevir. In 2008-2013 he continued his higher education at the Faculty of Oriental Studies of Baku Islamic University. After graduating from university in 2013, he went to military service. He was released from military service as a junior sergeant.

== Sports career ==
=== Powerlifting ===
He became interested in sports at the age of 7. He was engaged in wrestling from childhood to youth and participated in national championships. He was a bronze medalist of the Azerbaijani Sambo Championship in 2009. During his student years, he became interested in powerlifting (weightlifting) and began to practice this sport professionally. From 2010 to 2021, he was the national champion 11 times in a row. He is also the owner of the Azerbaijan Cup.

He won international powerlifting tournaments named by National Leader Heydar Aliyev in Azerbaijan in 2017, 2018 and 2019. He is also the winner of the "Bosphorus Cup" held in Turkey in 2015.

Winner of the Caucasus Championship in Georgia in 2016. Winner of the GPA-IPSU World Super Cup. In the 75 kg weight class, he was the European champion in 2013, 2017 and 2019, and the world champion in 2017, 2018 (2 times) and 2019. In the 5th World Powerlifting Championship (2019) Rovshan Khalilov won two gold and one silver medal in the 75 kg category. Khalilov broke three world records and updated his record in total result.

In 2014-2019, he was the winner and prize-winner of the Azerbaijani Mas Wrestling Championships and Cups. Bronze medalist of the European Mas Wrestling Championship in 2018. He has a coaching degree in the Mas Wrestling.

=== Strongman ===
2020 - Champion of Azerbaijan (the strongest man category).

== Achievements ==
Date	Competition	Location	Weight category	Medal
2013	Europe championship	Baku, Azerbaijan	67,5 кг	1
2017	Heydar Aliyev International Tournament	Baku, Azerbaijan	75 кг	1
2017	World Cup	Sochi, Russia	75 кг	1
2017	World championship	Dolgoprudny, Russia	75 кг	1
2018	Heydar Aliyev International Tournament	Baku, Azerbaijan	75 кг	1
2018	World championship	Moscow, Russia	75 кг	1
2018	World championship	Orlando, Florida, US	75 кг	1
2019	Heydar Aliyev International Tournament	Baku, Azerbaijan	75 кг	1
2019	Europe championship	Saint Petersburg, Russia	75 кг	1
2019	Europe championship	Saint Petersburg, Russia	75 кг	1
2019	World championship	Moscow, Russia	75 кг	1
2019	World championship	Moscow, Russia	75 кг	1
