= Adnan Şen =

Turkish businessman

- Other name: Adnan Sen
- Occupation: Businessman
- Title: Chairman of Bosphorus Gaz Corporation
- Spouse: Begüm Tanık (m. 1996)
- Children: Can Şen
- Father: Ali Şen
- Relatives: Süha Tanık (father-in-law)
- Awards: Ellis Island Medal of Honor (2022)

Adnan Şen (also spelled Adnan Sen) is a Turkish businessman. He is the chairman of Bosphorus Gaz Corporation, a private importer of natural gas into Turkey, and the founder of Sen Properties, a developer of luxury homes in Beverly Hills, California. He is the son of Ali Şen, a former president of Fenerbahçe, and has appeared as a guest on the Netflix reality series Selling Sunset.

== Early life and family ==
Şen is the son of Ali Şen, a former president of the Istanbul sports club Fenerbahçe. He has described himself as being of Turkish and Danish descent.

== Career ==
=== Energy ===
In 2003, Şen became a shareholder and board member of Tur Enerji, a natural gas company founded by his father with several partners. Tur Enerji later held 29 percent of Bosphorus Gaz, a gas importer in which the Russian company Gazprom held the other 71 percent. As general manager of Bosphorus Gaz, Şen led the company's delegation at an energy markets summit hosted by Turkey's energy market regulator, EPDK, in February 2015.

In June 2017, Şen, then managing director of Bosphorus Gaz, agreed to buy Gazprom's 71 percent stake in the company, subject to approval by Turkey's energy and competition authorities. The transaction was completed in September 2018, giving the Şen Group, which already held the remaining 29 percent, full ownership. Following the transfer, Şen became chairman of the board, with his father as honorary chairman. In December 2018, the energy publication ICIS reported that Şen had applied to buy two other Turkish gas importers, Akfel Gaz and Avrasya Gaz.

In 2021, Bosphorus Gaz extended its supply contract with Gazprom, for 2.5 billion cubic metres of gas a year, until 2043. In March 2025, Şen met Gazprom chief executive Alexey Miller to discuss cooperation between the two companies.

=== Real estate ===
Şen founded Sen Properties, which develops luxury homes in Beverly Hills. A mansion built for Şen at 1021 North Beverly Drive was offered for sale at US$75 million in 2020; the listing featured in Selling Sunset. In 2016, Sen Properties bought a property at 1000 Laurel Way in Beverly Hills for $8.75 million; Şen listed the house there for $39.9 million in 2020 and sold it in February 2024 for about $30 million.

=== Hotels ===
In 2015, Şen and Hakan Tanık bought and renovated the 63-room Hisar Hotel in the Basmane district of İzmir as the first hotel of a new chain, Smart Hotels.

== Television ==
Şen appeared in the second season of Selling Sunset (2020), in which Oppenheim Group agent Davina Potratz agreed to list his $75 million house. The listing remained a storyline in the third season, and Şen returned in the fifth season (2022).

== Recognition ==
On 14 May 2022, Şen received the Ellis Island Medal of Honor, awarded for his business career and his charitable work through the Alp Şen Foundation.

== Personal life ==
In December 1996, Şen married Begüm Tanık, the daughter of Süha Tanık, then a Motherland Party member of parliament for İzmir. Their son, Can Şen, was appointed to the board of Bosphorus Gaz in 2022.
