= Revolut =

British multinational neobank

Revolut Group Holdings Ltd

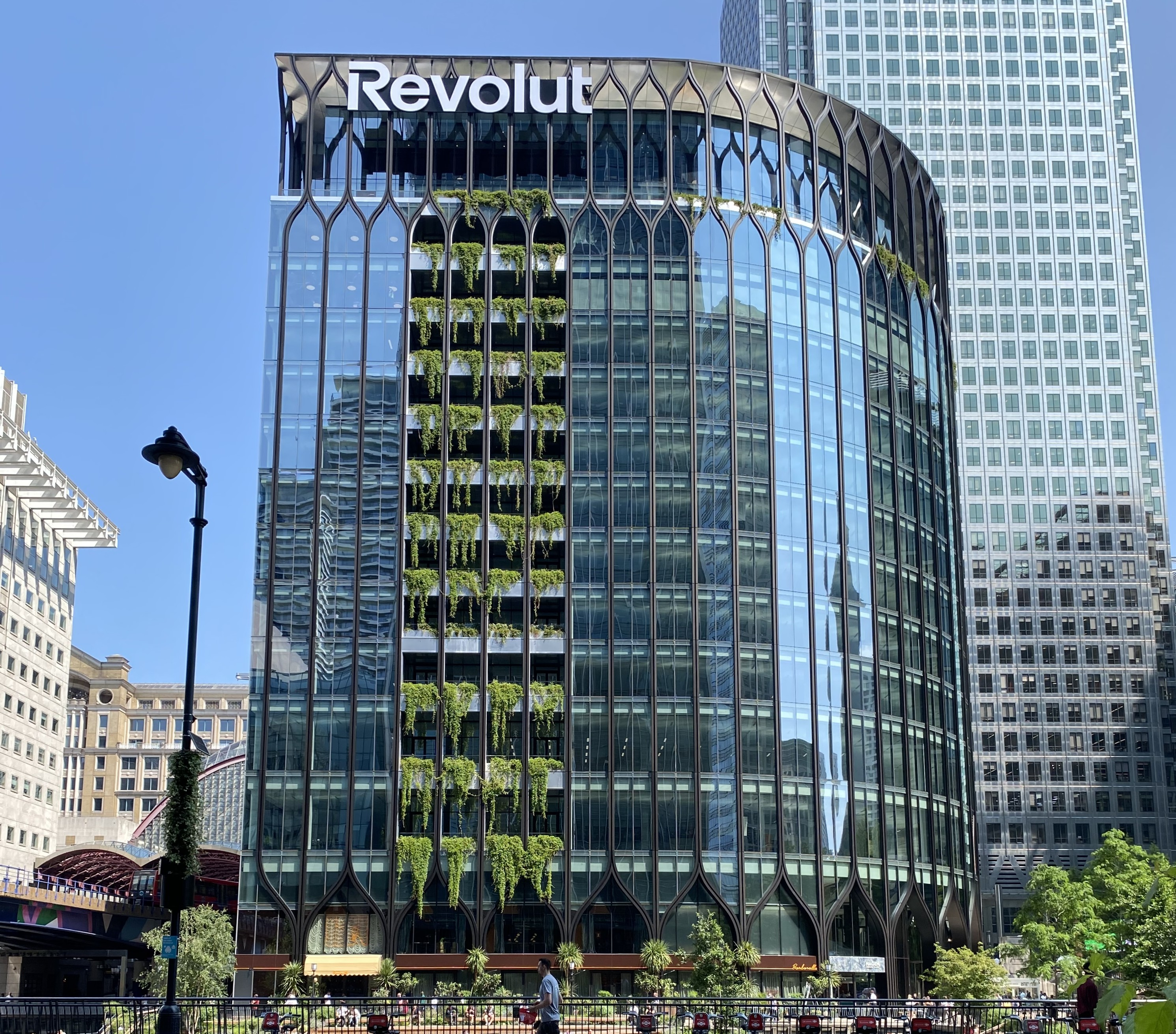
- Head office building at Canary Wharf, London
- Type: Private
- Industry: Financial services
- Founded: 1 July 2015; 11 years ago
- Founders: Nik Storonsky; Vlad Yatsenko
- Headquarters: London, England, UK
- Area served: United Kingdom, European Union, Norway, Iceland, Israel, Switzerland, Australia, Mexico, New Zealand, Japan, Singapore, United States, Brazil, India
- Key people: Martin Gilbert (chairman); Nik Storonsky (CEO); Donato Lucia (CTO); Vlad Yatsenko (non-executive director of the board)
- Products: current accounts, debit cards, stock trading, personal loan, foreign exchange, insurance, BNPL, business account
- Services: Peer-to-peer payments, currency exchange
- Revenue: ▲£4.52 billion (US$6.19 billion) (2025)
- Operating income: ▲£1.71 billion (US$2.35 billion) (2025)
- Net income: ▲£1.3 billion (US$1.79 billion) (2025)
- Number of employees: 12,200 (2025)
- Website: www.revolut.com

Revolut Group Holdings Ltd, known as Revolut, is a British multinational neobank and financial technology company headquartered in London, England. It was founded in July 2015 by Nik Storonsky and Vlad Yatsenko. The company offers free and subscription‑based digital banking services, primarily through a mobile app.

== History ==
=== Early history (2015–2017) ===
Revolut was founded in 2015 by Nik Storonsky and Vlad Yatsenko as an app enabling individuals in the United Kingdom and European Economic Area to spend money abroad using interbank foreign exchange rates. Customers could use their Revolut card in 90 currencies.

In 2016, the company reached around 300,000 users, processing almost £1 billion in transactions.

Revolut then launched a subscription-based app in June 2017 available to businesses across the UK and Europe. Under the name of "Revolut Business", businesses could create an account with a multi-currency IBAN to hold, exchange, and transfer money with 25 currencies.

=== EU banking licence and international expansion (2017–2022) ===
Quadrum office complex in Vilnius, head office of Revolut Bank UAB (name visible on left)

It first applied for an EU banking licence in November 2017, at which time it also started work on its own payment processor. The bank then received its EU banking licence as well as an EMI licence in December 2018 from the European Central Bank, facilitated by the Bank of Lithuania. Under its new licence, the bank could accept deposits and offer consumer credits, but it was not allowed to provide investment services until later.

Following the acquisition of a banking licence, the company announced plans in September 2019 for expansion into 24 new markets, supported by agreements with Visa and Mastercard. The company said that it also wanted to hire an additional 3,500 employees. In 2019, the Revolut app launched in beta to the Australia region. The following month, Revolut expanded to Singapore. In 2020, the app launched in the United States and Japan.

By November 2020, Revolut reported that it had reached breakeven. At that time, it was valued at £4.2 billion.

The company applied for banking licence in the United Kingdom and a bank charter in the United States in early 2021. The European Central Bank also granted Revolut a full banking licence later that year.

=== Transition to a licenced bank (2022–2023) ===
After having secured bank licences, Revolut started moving away from being an e-money institution to a bank. In January 2022, it started operating as a bank in 10 European countries. In January 2023, the company announced that it would transfer its 2 million Irish customers to a new Irish branch, moving them from a Lithuanian IBAN to an Irish IBAN. This was followed by a launch for IBANs in France, Netherlands and Spain in September 2023. By the end of the year, it was reported that Revolut held £15.1 billion in customer deposits.

Revolut expanded its investment offerings during this time. In September 2022, the UK's Financial Conduct Authority added Revolut to its list of companies authorised to offer cryptocurrency products and services, formalising its pre-2022 unregulated crypto trading. The bank also began allowing staking for holders of proof of stake cryptocurrencies in the UK and EEA. In October 2023, Revolut expanded its stock trading services to include European stock trading in the EEA.

In September 2022, Revolut was the target of a cyber attack that exposed the personal data of over 50,000 customers. Additionally, in July 2023, a flaw in its US payment system led to the loss of $20 million in corporate funds to criminal groups between late 2021 and early 2022, though some of the money was later recouped. On the regulatory front, Revolut halted cryptocurrency trading services for its US customers in 2023, citing the "evolving regulatory environment" as the Securities and Exchange Commission intensified scrutiny against the sector. Financially, despite its growth, the company reported £25m loss in 2022 amid ongoing uncertainty regarding the UK banking licence.

=== UK banking licence and global expansion (2024–2026) ===
Revolut was also granted a British banking licence the following month, though with restrictions via the standard "mobilisation" stage. By the end of 2024, Revolut reported having 50 million registered users globally.

In April 2025, Revolut obtained the Prepaid Payment Instruments (PPIs) licence from the Reserve Bank of India (RBI), to offer payment solutions including pre-paid cards.

In May 2025, Revolut announced that it plans to invest $1.1 billion over the next three years to expand in France and made Paris its Western European headquarters, at the Choose France summit.

In June 2025, Revolut announced its plans to acquire Cetelem Argentina, an Argentina-based lender, from BNP Paribas. Terms were not disclosed. The same month, Béatrice Cossa-Dumurgier (a former board member of Société Générale and executive at BNP Paribas) was appointed CEO of Revolut's Western Europe headquarters, based in Paris. In September 2025, it named former Société Générale CEO Frédéric Oudéa as Chairman of its Western Europe hub.

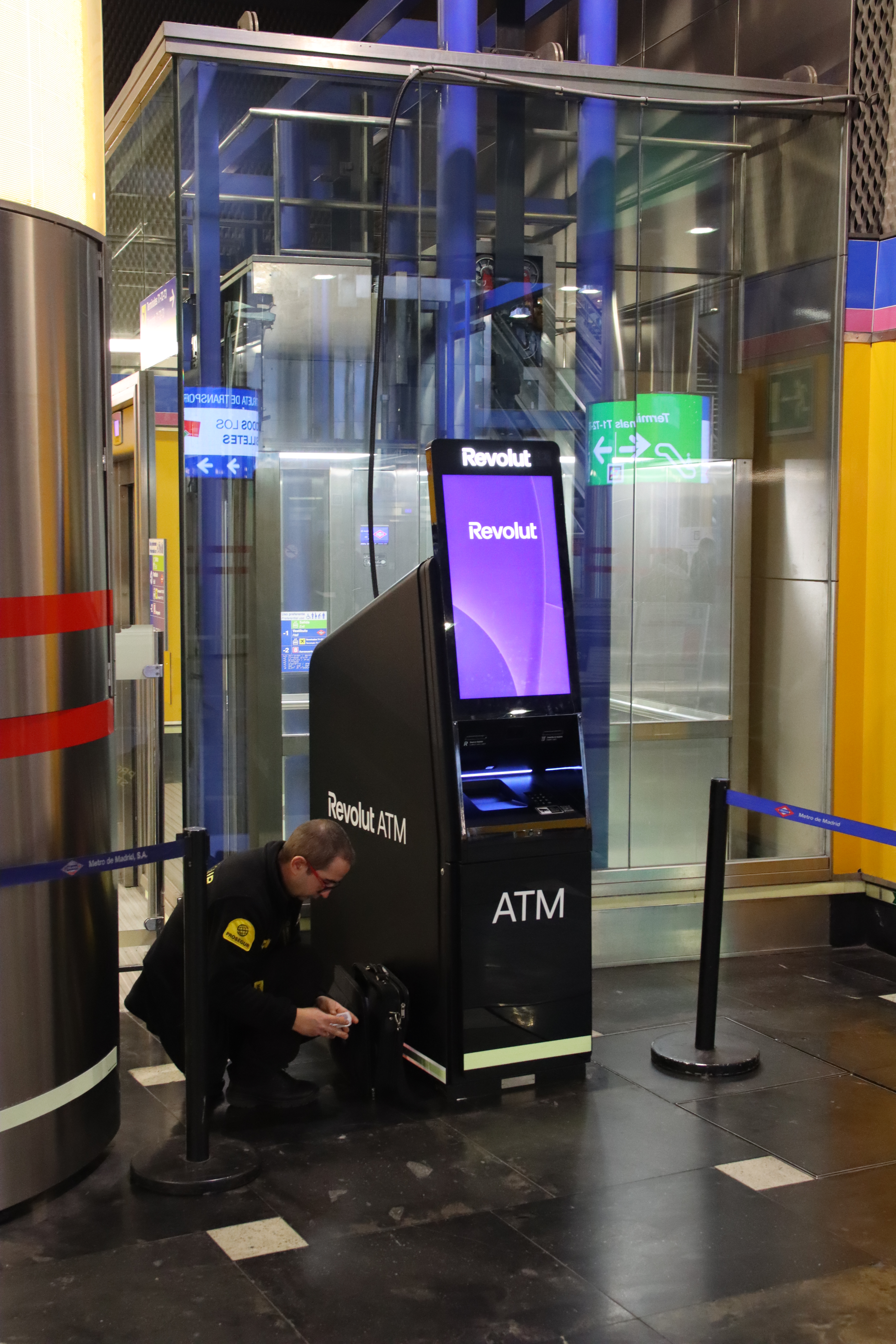
Revolut ATM at Madrid Barajas Airport metro station

In summer 2025, Revolut launched first 50 own branded ATMs in Spain. In September 2025, Revolut secured in-principle approval for payments licence from the UAE. In December 2025, Revolut entered talks with Blackstone that could see the world's largest alternative-asset manager offering its funds on the Revolut platform. In January 2026, Revolut applied for a full banking licence in Peru as it sought to expand into Latin America. This marked the firm's fifth market expansion.

On 27 January 2026, Revolut launched full banking operations in Mexico. This marked Revolut's first bank established outside of Europe and become the first independent digital bank to secure a Mexican banking licence through a direct application. Revolut capitalised its operations with over $100 million, which was more than double the regulatory minimum.

On 11 March 2026, Revolut announced that they have received their full UK banking licence, which means that customers will now be protected by the Financial Services Compensation Scheme on any deposits under £120,000. The licence also authorises the company to provide consumer credit services to UK customers.

In 2026, Revolut began offering a beta version of its services in India.

In July 2026, the Australian Prudential Regulation Authority granted Revolut an unrestricted banking licence in Australia. The Financial Times reported that Revolut launched savings and credit products following the approval, making Australia its first banking licence in Asia-Pacific and its second outside the United Kingdom and Europe, after Mexico.

In August 2026, Revolut was awarded a full banking licence in France, following assessment by the French Prudential Supervision and Resolution Authority and the European Central Bank. The licence allows Revolut to expand its French banking products, including loans, mortgages and savings products. The Financial Times reported that France was one of Revolut's largest European markets, with around 7 million customers.

In November 2026, the Bank of Israel granted Revolut a conditional licence to establish an Israeli bank. This followed its discussions to obtain a "lean bank" licence in 2025.

=== US expansion and IPO plans ===
In 2025, Revolut explored an existing US bank acquisition to further expand its global footprint. In February 2026, the company announced that it was shifting its plan to establish an independent national charter and had applied for a licence with the Office of the Comptroller of the Currency (OCC).

On 5 March 2026, Revolut announced it had applied for a US banking licence with the OCC and the FDIC.

In an 20 April 2026 interview to Bloomberg, Revolut CEO Nik Storonsky stated that the digital bank is approximately two years away from an IPO, with a U.S. listing as the preference. The following day, the Financial Times reported that Revolut was targeting a market capitalisation of between $150 billion and $200 billion in its eventual IPO, and planned a secondary share sale in the second half of 2026 at a valuation exceeding $100 billion. Revolut reported revenue of $6 billion for the financial year ended 31 December 2025, up from $4 billion in 2024, and net profit of $1.7 billion, up from $1 billion, with 68.3 million retail customers at year-end. By September 2026, the Financial Times reported that Revolut had more than 80 million customers across 40 countries.

In July 2026, Reuters reported that Revolut had begun a secondary share sale at $2,017 per share, implying a valuation of $115 billion, up from $75 billion in a share sale the previous year. In September 2026, Revolut obtained conditional approval for a US banking licence. In September 2026, Revolut announced it is planning a dual listing in New York and London for its IPO.

== Products and services ==
Revolut began as a mobile app linked to a prepaid card for spending abroad and foreign exchange. The company later expanded into banking, business accounts, lending, subscriptions, investments and cryptocurrency services.

In a 2025 interview, former product owner George Robson described Revolut's consumer subscription business as modeled on Amazon Prime. He said the subscription model was intended to support the company's expansion from a multi-currency account and travel card into everyday financial services.

Revolut expanded into investing in 2019 and launched in-app share trading for European customers. Wired reported that the service allowed trading in 300 US-listed stocks on the New York Stock Exchange and Nasdaq. After receiving a UK trading licence in 2024, Revolut expanded its investment offering to include UK and EU-listed stocks and ETFs, and later launched a UK stocks and shares ISA using ETFs from providers including BlackRock and Vanguard.

In August 2026, Revolut announced the launch of EURR, a euro-pegged stablecoin. Bloomberg reported that the launch was part of Revolut's broader stablecoin strategy, including plans for tokens linked to other currencies.

== Criticism and controversies ==
Revolut has faced criticism concerning customer service, account suspensions, fraud prevention and regulatory compliance.

=== Data security ===
In 2026, Revolut disclosed customer information to a scammer who pretended that they represented a government agency.

=== Employment practices ===
In March 2019, Wired reported allegations from former employees concerning Revolut's employment practices and work culture, including unpaid work, high staff turnover and pressure to work weekends. A later article in December 2019 by Sifted noted that Revolut had a higher Glassdoor rating than its peers.

=== Compliance and regulation ===
In 2018, The Telegraph reported that Revolut had changed its system for handling transactions potentially matching sanctions lists. In 2019, the BBC reported concerns raised by a former employee and other employees about Revolut's anti-money-laundering controls and compliance practices, including allegations that recommendations from its compliance team had been ignored.

In 2026, the European Central Bank restricted some activities of Revolut's European arm following concerns about its product-approval processes, requiring an independent risk review and changes to staffing and oversight. Revolut was also criticised in 2025 after freezing accounts belonging to some customers with Russian passports who were legally resident in Europe.

In November 2026, a Milan court placed Revolut Bank UAB under judicial administration for one year over persistent deficiencies in its anti-money-laundering controls, with supervision limited to its Italian operations. According to the court, 24 individuals under investigation or convicted of crimes, including mafia-related offences, had used Revolut accounts to move or conceal €41.9 million between 2021 and 2026. Four individuals convicted of mafia association had transferred more than €4.6 million through the bank despite asset seizures. Other banks had filed 265 suspicious transaction reports concerning the 24 individuals, while Revolut had filed none. Court-appointed administrators were tasked with overseeing improvements to customer screening and transaction monitoring.

In November 2026, Sweden's financial intelligence unit identified Revolut as a frequently used channel for suspected Russian money laundering, with funds transferred mainly to Lithuania and Ireland. The findings were based on an analysis of 2.9 billion kronor (€259 million) in suspicious transactions across multiple banks. According FT, the EU's Anti-Money Laundering Authority was monitoring Revolut following concerns raised by Italian authorities.

=== Customer accounts and fraud ===
Revolut has faced criticism over the suspension of customer accounts, with media reports documenting cases in which customers were unable to access funds for extended periods. In 2020, The Times reported that Revolut suspended and subsequently closed a business account containing €300,000, preventing the company from paying staff; Revolut subsequently apologised and rectified the issue.

The company has also faced scrutiny over its handling of fraud. In 2023, Revolut reported a reduction in authorised push-payment fraud, but the number of fraud reports involving Revolut customers increased between February 2023 and February 2024. In 2024, BBC Panorama reported on customers who said Revolut had failed to adequately protect or reimburse them following fraud.

== Partnerships ==
In January 2025, Manchester City W.F.C. announced Revolut as the training sleeve kit sponsor. This partnership was later extended to include the back-of-shirt sponsors of both the men's and women's teams.

That same month, Revolut became an official partner of the French rugby club Stade Toulousain.

In March 2025, Revolut announced a strategic partnership with Wizz Air to integrate Revolut Pay as a primary payment method for the airline.

On 3 June 2025, Revolut signed a membership agreement with European Payments Initiative (EPI). The agreement includes integration of Wero, mobile-first wallet and instant account-to-account payment solution, into Revolut.

In July 2025, Audi F1 Team announced a multi-year deal with Revolut to be the title sponsor of the team, beginning with the 2026 season. In the same month, Revolut was named the Official Global Banking and FX Partner for the Italian football club Como 1907.

In November 2025, Booking.com added Revolut Pay as a payment method for accommodation bookings. The arrangement also included access to RevPoints, Revolut's loyalty programme points, for some Booking.com transactions.

In March 2026, Revolut became official back of shirt partner of Manchester City F.C., extending the relationship with the club to the men's team.

In July 2026, Revolut became Como 1907 official front-of-shirt sponsor starting with the 2026/2027 season. This further extended their partnership that originally started in 2025.

The company also has partnerships in other sports, such as an ongoing agreement with the NBA to serve as an associate partner for the NBA Paris Game.

== Workplace policy ==
In June 2026, Revolut announced that graduate employees and interns joining the company in 2027 would be required to work from the office at least three days a week, marking a retreat from its fully remote policy. The company said the change was intended to support in-person collaboration and mentoring but its remote policy would remain unchanged for other employees.

== See also ==
- Neobanks in Europe
- List of banks in the United Kingdom
- List of banks in the euro area
