= Vlad Yatsenko =

British-Ukrainian entrepreneur (born 1983)

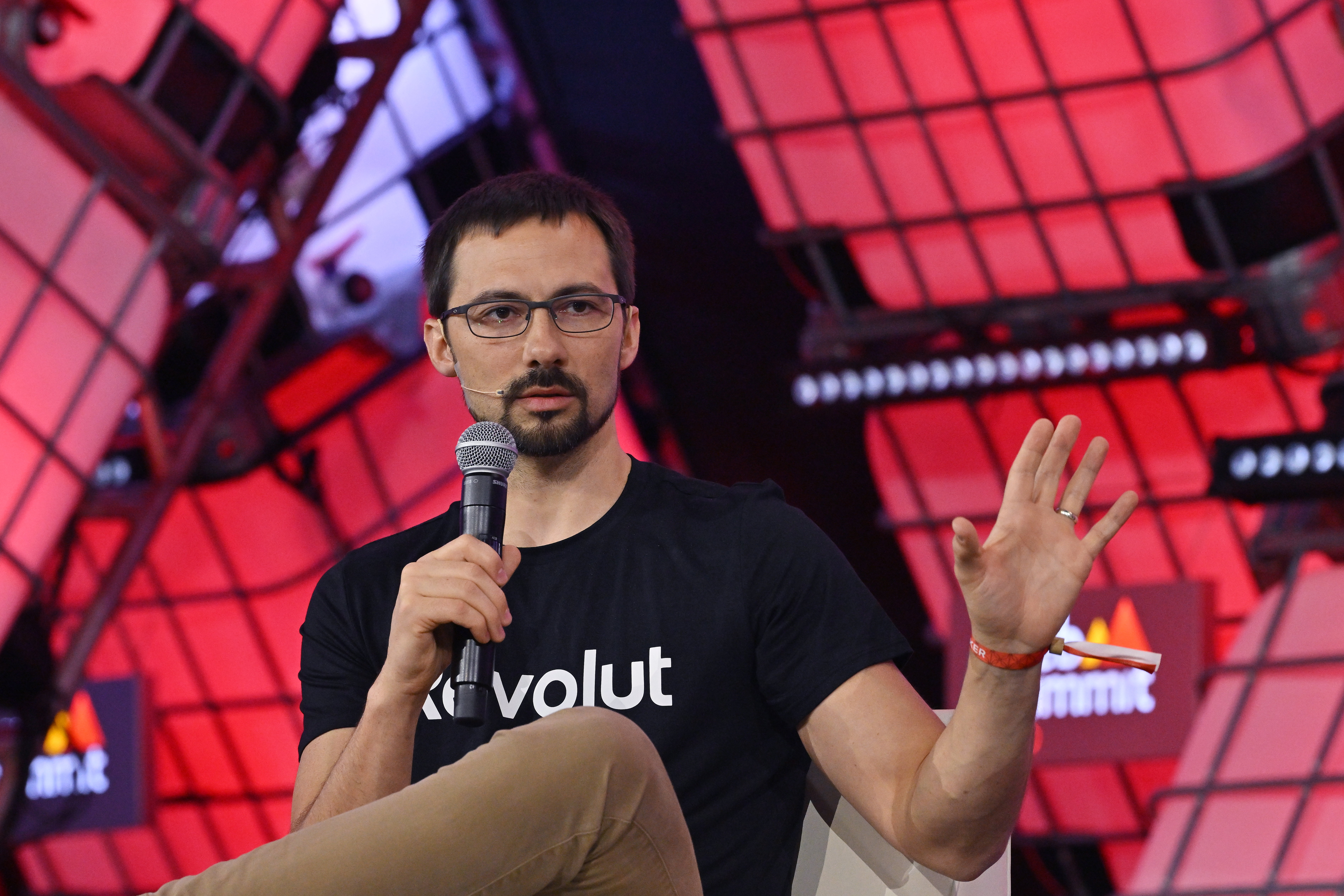
- Yatsenko in May 2023
- Born: Vladyslav Yatsenko; August 1983 (age 43); East Germany
- Occupations: Entrepreneur; software developer
- Known for: co-founder of Revolut

Vladyslav Yatsenko (Ukrainian: Владислав Яценко; born August 1983) is a British entrepreneur and software engineer of Ukrainian origin. He is the Co-Founder and Chief Technology Officer (CTO) of the FinTech Company Revolut.

As of July 2026, Forbes ranked him as the 1,913th wealthiest person in the world, with a net worth of US$2.2 billion. He was one of six Ukrainian billionaires in 2026.

== Early life and education ==
Yatsenko was born in East Germany to a career officer in the Soviet armed forces. After the dissolution of the Soviet Union, his family moved to the city of Yuzhne (now Pivdenne) near Odesa.

In 2000, he enrolled in the Faculty of Computer Science at Petro Mohyla Mykolaiv State University (now Petro Mohyla Black Sea National University). While studying, he worked as a computer lab administrator to access the university's computers and the internet. He graduated with honours in 2006.

Yatsenko has said he started programming at around age 15 and, because he had limited access to computers, initially practiced coding on paper.

== Career ==
After graduating, Yatsenko worked as a developer in the Kraków office of Polish company Comarch, and in 2010 moved to London to become a senior developer at UBS. He later worked at Deutsche Bank and Credit Suisse.

While at Credit Suisse, Yatsenko met financier Nik Storonsky, who invited him to co-found a new project, Revolut, which initially offered a multi-currency card with favourable exchange rates. Revolut was launched in 2015. At launch, Yatsenko received 20% of the company, while Storonsky retained 80%.

As of 2020, Forbes Ukraine reported that, as CTO, Yatsenko led a team of around 500 programmers. Business Insider reported that he usually prefers to stay out of the spotlight and rarely gives interviews.

In July 2021, Forbes Ukraine, citing PitchBook data, reported that as of December 2020 Yatsenko held around 3.97% of the company's shares. After an investment round valuing the company at $33 billion, his stake may have fallen to about 3.87%. In November 2025, Revolut said it had completed a secondary share sale valuing the company at $75 billion.

== Wealth ==
In 2025, The Sunday Times Rich List estimated Yatsenko's wealth at £1.025 billion.. In 2025, Forbes estimated his net worth at $1.2 billion.

== Philanthropy ==
In November 2021, Yatsenko donated €100,000 to The Late Late Toy Show Appeal and said he would match further donations made via Revolut (up to €1 million).

After the start of the full-scale Russian invasion of Ukraine, Yatsenko publicly spoke against the war, and Revolut donated £1.5 million to the Red Cross.

== Personal life ==
Yatsenko lives in London. He holds Ukrainian and British citizenship.

Forbes Ukraine reported that Yatsenko is married and has two children.
