= Srbijagas =

Serbian energy company

- Official logo

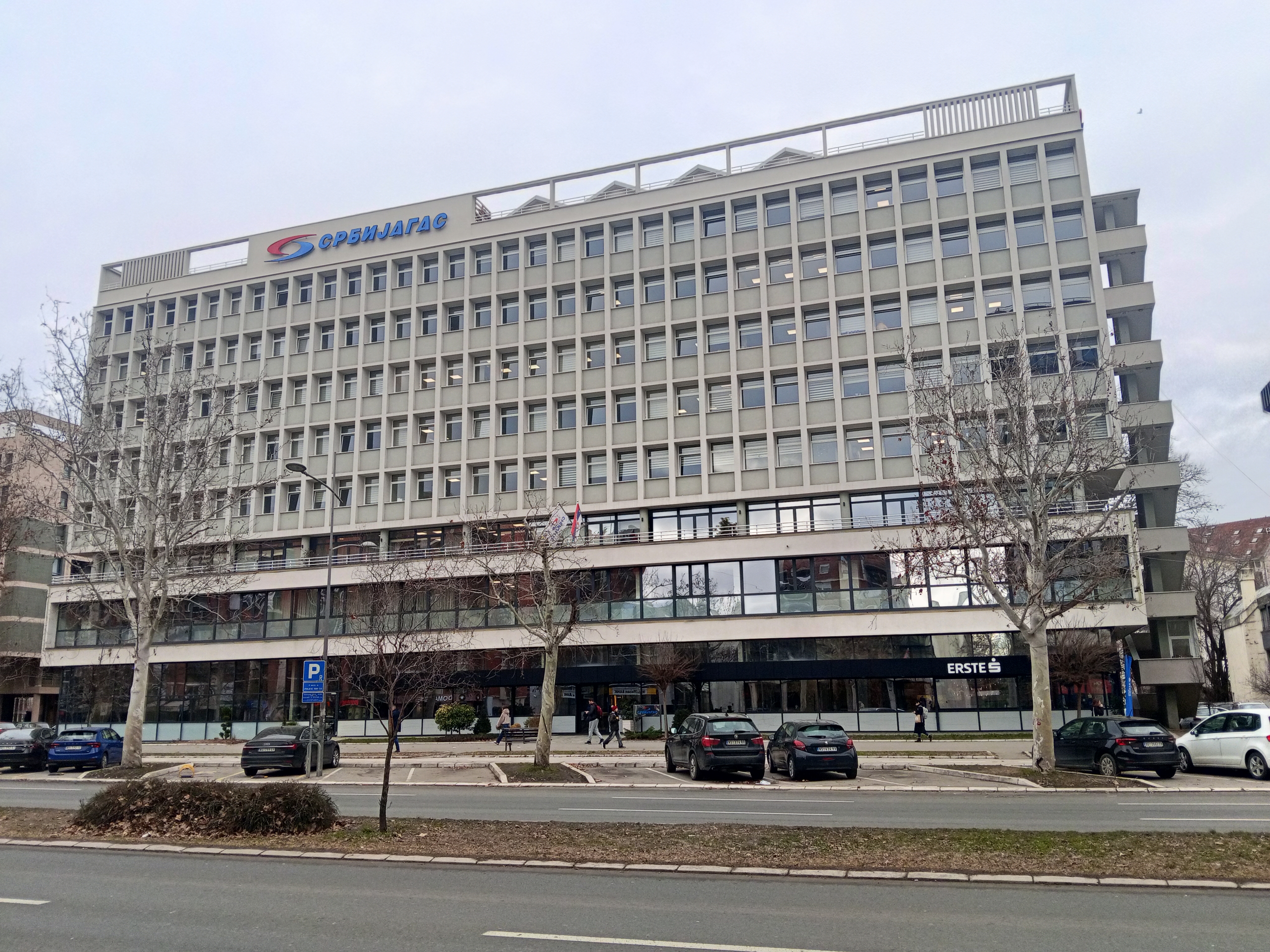
- Headquarters in Novi Sad
- Native name: Србијагас
- Type: State-owned enterprise
- Industry: Natural gas
- Predecessor: NIS-Gas
- Founded: 1 October 2005; 21 years ago
- Headquarters: Bulevar Oslobođenja 69, Novi Sad, Serbia
- Area served: Serbia
- Key people: Dušan Bajatović (General director)
- Services: Distribution of natural gas
- Revenue: ▲€1.564 billion (2024)
- Net income: ▼€80.06 million (2024)
- Total assets: ▼€2.792 billion (2024)
- Total equity: ▲€1.286 billion (2024)
- Owner: Government of Serbia (100%)
- Number of employees: ▲2,331 (2024)
- Subsidiaries: Subsidiaries
- Website: www.srbijagas.com
- Footnotes; Business ID: 20084600; Tax ID: 104056656

Srbijagas (full legal name: J.P. Srbijagas Novi Sad) is the state-owned natural gas provider in Serbia with headquarters in Novi Sad.

== History ==
Srbijagas was established on 1 October 2005 as a result of restructuring the integrated petroleum company NIS. The company was created on the basis of NIS divisions NIS-Gas and NIS-Energogas. Dušan Bajatović was appointed general director of the company in 2008. According to a state audit, the term from his 2012 re-appointment had expired in 2016, but he continued to act as general director. Srbijagas holds a 49% interest in Banatski Dvor, a gas storage company founded in 2010 together with Gazprom, which holds the remaining 51%. As of September 2026, the company had storage capacities of 450 million cubic meters.

In 2013, the government of Serbia decided to split Srbijagas into two separate companies because of its mounting debt and unsustainable business practices. Since 2013, the transportation and storage units have been operated by Transgas AD, while trade and distribution have continued to be operated by the Srbijagas AD. In May 2021, Transportgas was transferred from Srbijagas to the government of Serbia. Since June 2022, Srbijagas has an agreement with Gazprom for the delivery of 2.2 billion cubic meters of gas per year. The agreement originally expired in May 2025, but was extended several times until at least December 2026. In June 2023, Srbijagas and Hungary's state owned MVM established Serbhungas, a joint venture for gas trading. Srbijagas holds 49%, while MVM holds 51%.

In December 2025, Srbijagas established Gas infrastruktura to perform the ownership function for gas transmission assets, with an independent transmission operator remaining responsible for operating the system. Also in December 2025, Srbijagas took over gas distribution from Gas-Feromont in several municipalities. Afterwards Srbijagas did not recognize pre-payments made by customers to Gas-Feromont. In October 2026, the state owned gas distribution company Novi Sad–Gas was merged into Srbijagas.

== Subsidiaries ==
As of 13 May 2024, the following companies are subsidiaries or companies in minority ownership of Srbijagas:

- Distribucijagas Srbija d.o.o. Novi Sad
- Specijalana luka d.o.o. Pančevo
- Gas d.o.o. Bečej
- Progresgas trejding d.o.o. Belgrade
- Metanolsko-sirćetni kompleks a.d. Kikinda
- Toza Marković a.d. Kikinda
- Podzemno skladište gasa d.o.o. Banatski dvor
- Sogaz a.d.o. Novi Sad
- Informatika a.d. Belgrade
- Loznica-gas d.o.o. Loznica
- Yugorosgaz a.d. Belgrade
- Bijeljina Gas d.o.o. Bijeljina, Bosnia and Herzegovina
- Gas Promet a.d. Pale, Bosnia and Herzegovina
- Energogas d.o.o. Podgorica, Montenegro
- South Stream Serbia AG, Switzerland

Srbijagas acquired shares in several companies through the conversion of unpaid gas debts into equity, including majority holdings in the chemical producer Metanolsko-sirćetni kompleks and the ceramics manufacturer Toza Marković.

== Financial data ==
At the end of 2011, the company's total equity was US$443.38 million and after one year it dropped to only US$15.86 million, making the company for the first time unprofitable, mainly because of differences in cost and selling price.

In April 2013, Minister of Energy, Development and Environmental Protection, Zorana Mihajlović stated that Srbijagas has debt of more than €1 billion.

In June 2014, it was once again named the most unprofitable state-owned company, making an annual net loss of €443.14 million for the calendar year of 2013.

For the calendar year of 2014, Srbijagas finished with the yet another annual net loss of €372.33 million.

For the calendar year of 2015, Srbijagas managed to severely cut total net loss from the past year to just €2.98 million. After several years of posting annual net losses, Srbijagas finished 2016 calendar year with the annual net profit of €13.78 million.

In 2025, Srbijagas reported a net profit of RSD9.78 billion, compared with RSD8.37 billion in 2024. Its revenue declined to RSD143.8 billion in 2025 from RSD182 billion in 2024.

== See also ==
- Serbian Stream
