= Panrusgáz =

Panrusgáz Gas Trading Plc. Panrusgáz Gázkereskedelmi Zrt.
- Company type: private
- Industry: oil and gas
- Founded: October 1, 1994
- Headquarters: Budapest, Hungary
- Key people: Alexey Zaytsev (Director-General)
- Products: natural gas
- Services: importing and distribution of natural gas
- Revenue: US$2.6 billion (2007)
- Net income: 2,700,000 euro (2018)
- Number of employees: 270 (2007)
- Parent: Gazprom
- Website: www.panrusgaz.hu

Panrusgáz is a Hungarian natural gas company responsible for the import of natural gas from Russia mainly Gazprom. The company sold 8.8 billion cubic meter of natural gas in Hungary in 2006. It was placed fourth on the Hungarian business weekly Heti Világgazdaság top-500 list of Hungarian companies by 2008 revenue of HUF 781 billion.

The company is owned by Gazprom Export, E.ON Ruhrgas International AG, and Centrex Hungária Zrt. It was established in 1994 as a joint venture of Gazprom and Hungarian gas company MOL. In January 2006, MOL's shares were acquired by German energy company E.ON.
