= Dolgoprudnaya railway station =

Railway station in Moscow Oblast, Russia

Dolgoprudnaya Долгопрудная
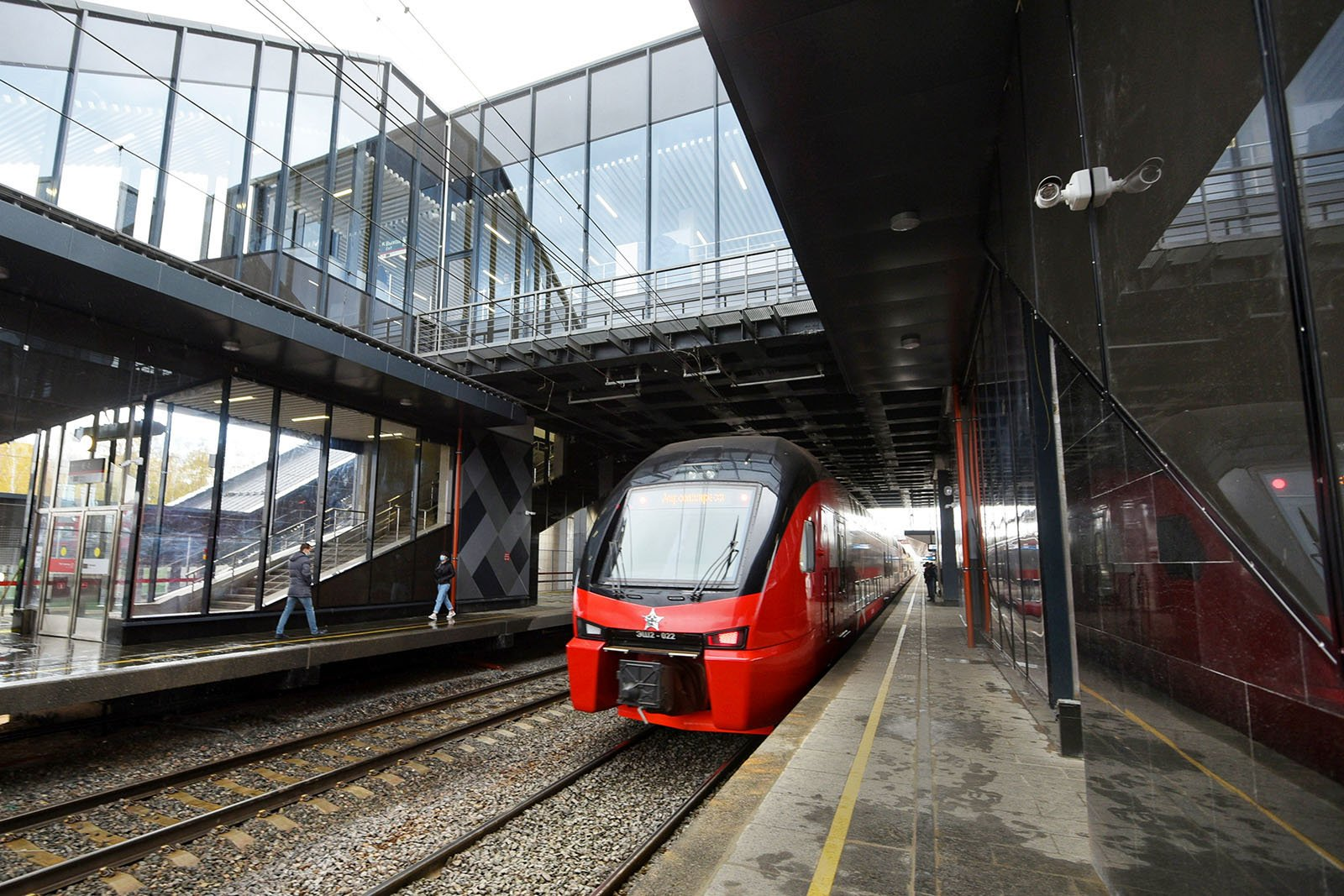

General information
- Location: Dolgoprudny, Moscow Oblast; Russia
- Coordinates: 55.9396°N 37.5202°E
- System: Moscow Railway platform
- Owner: Russian Railways
- Operator: Moscow Railway
- Platforms: 2 (Island platform)
- Tracks: 2

History
- Opened: 1914
- Rebuilt: 2020

Services
Preceding station	Moscow Central Diameters	Following station
Novodachnaya towards Odintsovo	Line D1	Vodniki towards Lobnya
Route map
Location

Dolgoprudnaya is a railway station of Line D1 of the Moscow Central Diameters in Dolgoprudny, Moscow Oblast. It was opened in 1914 and rebuilt in 2020.

== Gallery ==
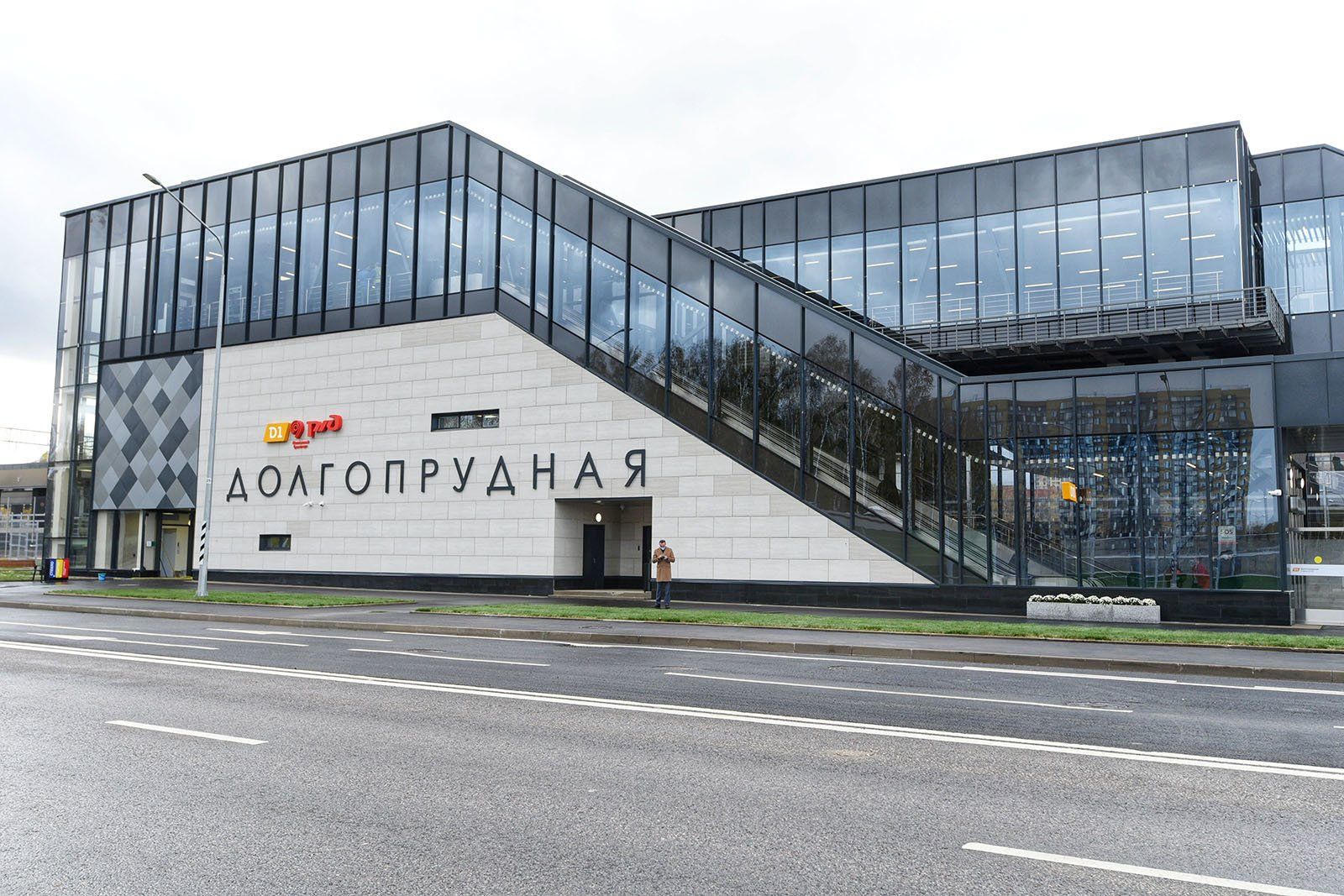
Dolgoprudnaya railway station after reconstruction in October 2020.

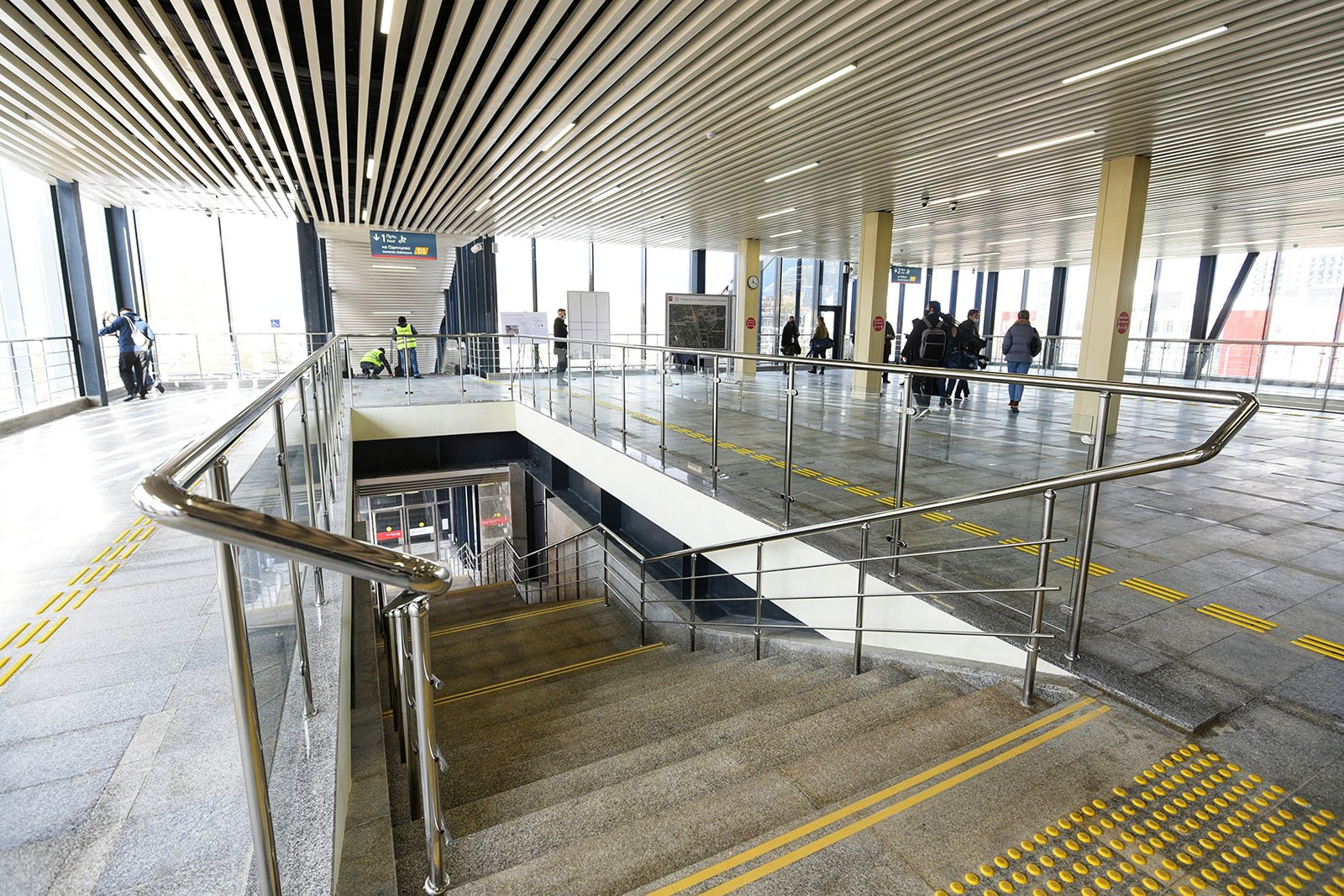

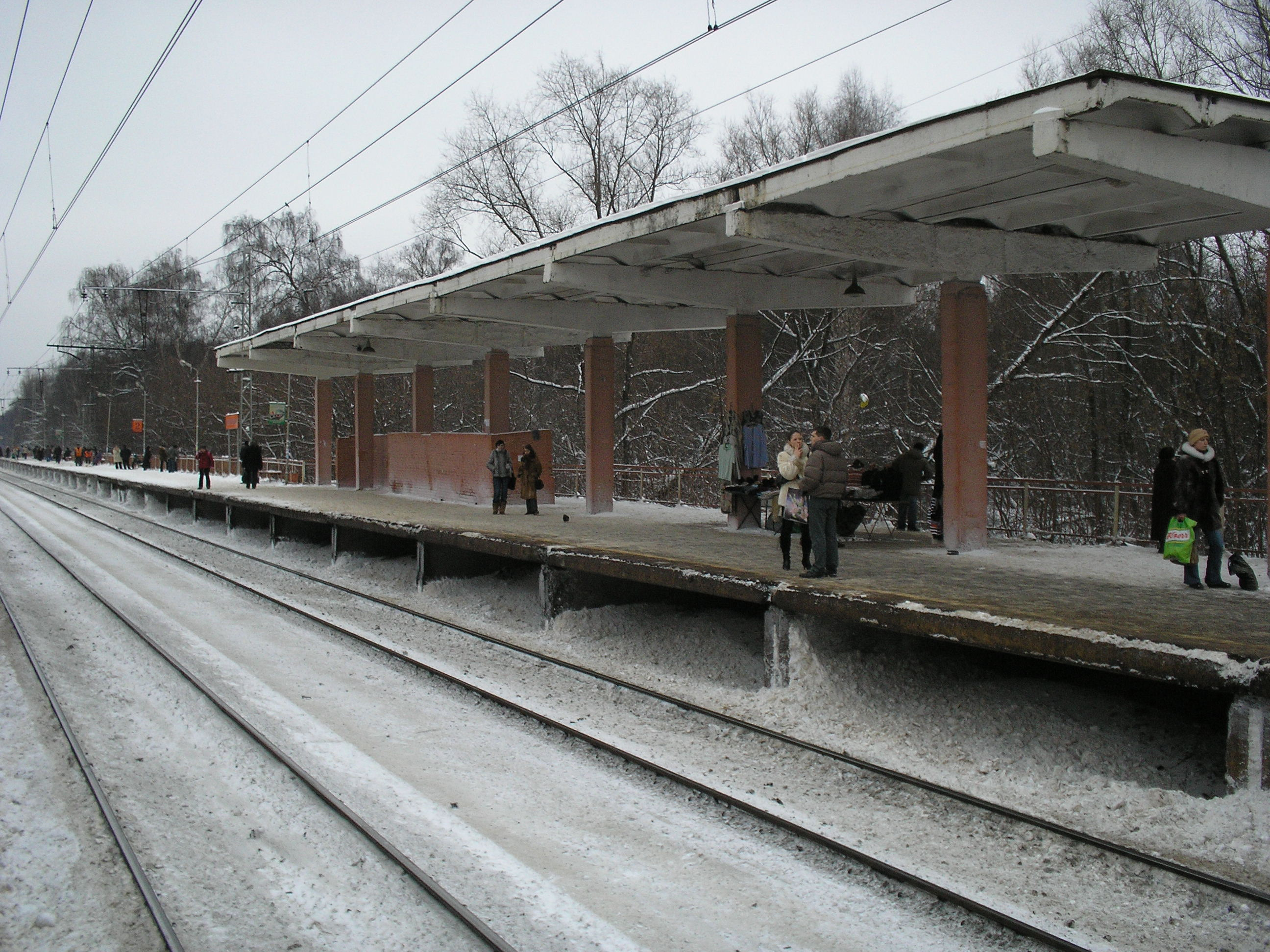
The station in 2007, before reconstruction.
