= Nigaz =

Joint venture between Gazprom and the Nigerian National Petroleum Corporation

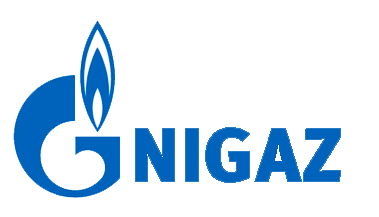
Logo of Nigaz

Nigaz is an energy exploration and generation company operating throughout Nigeria, specializing in the construction of oil and gas refineries, pipelines, and gas power stations. It is a joint venture between the Russian gas company Gazprom EP International B.V. (100% affiliate of OAO Gazprom) and the Nigerian National Petroleum Corporation.

It plans to invest 2.5 billion US dollars to build oil and gas refineries, pipelines and gas power stations in Nigeria. In 2009, Russian president Dmitry Medvedev announced his intention to form a major energy partnership with Nigeria at a meeting in Abuja with Nigerian president Umaru Yar'Adua.

The company's name, a portmanteau of "Nigeria" and "Gazprom", attracted media attention because of its similarity to the potentially offensive word "niggaz", a plural form of "nigga", a slang derivative and reclaimed word from "nigger", in African American Vernacular English.
