= Bosphorus Gaz Corporation =

Gas importer and distributor in Turkey

- Company type: Private
- Industry: Energy
- Founded: 2003
- Headquarters: Istanbul
- Website: https://bosphorusgaz.com/

Bosphorus Gaz Corporation is a gas importer and distributor in Turkey. It controls about 25% of Turkey's private natural gas market.

The company was established in 2003 in Istanbul. In 2004, Securing Energy for Europe a former subsidiary of the Russian gas company Gazprom, became shareholder in Bosphorus Gaz. In 2009, Gazprom raised its share in the company from 40% to 51% and then to 71% in 2010. In 2018, Gazprom sold all of its 71% shares in the company to the Şen Group who owned 29% of the shares, making Şen Group's share add up to 100%.

In 2005, Bosphorus Gaz won a tender to resell 750 million cubic meters of the gas purchased by the Turkish energy company BOTAŞ from Gazprom until 2021.
