= YugoRosGaz =

Serbian natural gas company

- Official logo
- Type: Joint-stock company
- Industry: Petroleum
- Founded: 5 June 1996; 30 years ago
- Headquarters: Belgrade, Serbia
- Key people: Aleksej Muratov (General director)
- Products: Natural gas
- Services: Pipeline construction, Distribution of natural gas
- Revenue: ▲€435.73 million (2018)
- Net income: ▲€9.85 million (2018)
- Total assets: ▼€100.01 million (2018)
- Total equity: ▲€39.13 million (2018)
- Owner: Gazprom (75%); Srbijagas (25%)
- Number of employees: 22 (2018)
- Parent: Gazprom
- Subsidiaries: Yugorosgaz-Transport d.o.o.
- Website: www.yugorosgaz.rs

YugoRosGaz a.d. is a Serbian natural gas distributor and transportation company, a subsidiary of Russian Gazprom. It is headquartered in Belgrade, Serbia.

== History ==
YugoRosGaz was founded in 1996 after an agreement between the Federal Republic of Yugoslavia and Russia. At the time, Gazprom held 50% of the shares while Serbian companies held the other 50%. The purpose of the company was to build gas pipelines as well as transport and sell natural gas. In 2005, Gazprom acquired a 25% interest in the company from Serbian Progres trough Centrex, raising their effective share to 75%.

In 2009, YugoRosGaz participated in a gasification programme, which intended to supply gas to 8,000 people in Niš. Gasification of Niš began in 1998 and by 2009, YugoRosGaz had invested $12 million. In April 2012, the 52-kilometre Niš–Leskovac section of the MG-11 gas pipeline, developed by YugoRosGaz, was opened. In March 2013, YugoRosGaz signed a natural gas supply contract with Gazprom Export for deliveries of 1.5 billion cubic metres of gas per year. The volume increased to 2 billion cubic metres beginning in 2018, with the contract running until the end of 2021. YugoRosGaz owns the 64-kilometre MG-09 Pojate–Niš pipeline. Its subsidiary YugoRosGaz-Transport operates 125 kilometres of pipelines in southeastern Serbia.

In 2022, YugoRosGaz had a profit of RSD2.3 billion, ranking 56th in Serbia. As of September 2026, YugoRosGaz is owned by Gazprom (75%) and Srbijagas (25%).

== See also ==
- List of Gazprom subsidiaries
