= Gazprom Promgaz =

Russian company

Gazprom Promgaz JSC
- Native name: Газпром промгаз
- Type: Public (AO)
- Industry: Engineering
- Founded: 1949
- Headquarters: Saint Petersburg, Russia
- Area served: Russia
- Key people: Storonsky Nikolai Mironovich (CEO)
- Services: Development of gas supply and gasification Development of regional gas and gas condensate fields Regional energy Improvement of costing and pricing policies in the design, construction and major repairs of PJSC Gazprom Design of gas industry and energy facilities, industrial and civil facilities Scientific and technical services for the examination of projects and estimates
- Number of employees: Estimated- 500
- Website: promgaz.gazprom.ru

Joint Stock Company Gazprom Promgaz (Russian: Акционерное Общество "Газпром промгаз"), abbreviated as JSC Gazprom Promgaz (Russian: ОАО "Газпром промгаз"), IPA: [ɡɐsˈprom promˈɡas]), is a Russian company specialising in structural engineering, design, research, heating, the electric power market, and other services related to natural gas. The company is a research institute established in 1949.

The company's headquarters are in Saint Petersburg. JSC Gazprom Promgaz is a member of self‑regulatory organisations in the fields of engineering surveys and design, and holds all necessary permits to carry out work, including at particularly hazardous and technically complex facilities. The company has an Integrated Management System, which includes a Quality Management System (GOST R ISO 9001, STO Gazprom 9001), an Environmental Management System (GOST R ISO 14001), an Occupational Safety and Health Management System (GOST R ISO 45001), as well as a Risk Management and Internal Control System.

== History ==
The organization was established on 17 June 1949 and was primarily called the All-Union Research and Design Institute of Underground Coal Gasification or VNIIPodzemgaz (Russian: Всесоюзный научно-исследовательский и проектный институт подземной газификации углей, or ВНИИПодземгаз). It was created from the Laboratory of Underground Gasification of the All-Union Gas Research Institute (Russian: ВНИГИ), and developed technologies of underground coal, oil shale and petroleum gasification.

The first director of VNIIPodzemgaz was Andrey Chernyshov. Under his direction, the basis of technology of underground coal gasification was developed and awarded the Stalin prize. In 1954, technicians of VNIIPodzemgaz made hydraulic fracturing of the coal-bed for the first time in the world.

In 1964, VNIIPodzemgaz was renamed as the All-Union Research and Designed Institute of Industrial Gasification or VNIIPromgaz (Russian: ВНИИПромгаз).

In the 1970s, the organization transformed into the all-Union research association, which consisted of the following:

- Research institute
- Central Asian branch in Tashkent (Uzbekistan)
- Three plants for making gas-powered equipment:
  - Kamensk-Shakhtinsky (Russia)
  - Fastov (Ukraine)
  - Leninabad (now Qanliko‘l, Uzbekistan)
- Startup and adjustment sectors
- State test center for gas burner devices
- Special planning and design bureau

During these years, the organization was headed by Nikolay Fyodorov. Since the early 1970s to the mid-1980s, the organization worked as the Coordinating Сentre for the Comecon countries on development of methods to use gas as a fuel and the creation of gas-powered equipment.

After the collapse of the Soviet Union and a series of reforms (including transformation of state enterprises into joint stock companies in 1994), VNIIPromgaz became Open Joint Stock Company Promgaz (OAO Promgaz, Russian: ОАО "Промгаз") and was entirely focused on the development of technologies for effective gas use.

In 2008, Promgaz was renamed to OJSC Gazprom Promgaz.

In February 2013, professor Yury Spector became CEO.

In 2014, the company projected the general scheme for gas supply of Kyrgyzstan.

In 2015, Oleg Andreyev became CEO. OJSC Gazprom Promgaz was renamed to JSC Gazprom Promgaz (Russian: АО "Газпром промгаз").

In 2019, Nikolay Storonsky became CEO.

== Operations ==
Gazprom Promgaz plans gas transportation and its distribution systems, as well as investigating various research in the field of natural gas. The company is the general planner of the natural gas supply program for Russian regions, developed by Gazprom. The company is also a research center of Gazprom in the field of regional power systems, the supply, distribution and use of gas, efficient energy use and energy-savings, price setting for construction of gas industry objectives, the development of regional hydrocarbon fields and development of non-traditional hydrocarbon resources including coal bed methane.

== Directors ==
CEO - Storonsky Nikolai Mironovich
