= Securing Energy for Europe =

Oil and gas company in Berlin, Germany

SEFE Securing Energy for Europe
- Formerly: Gazprom Germania (1990–2022)
- Type: GmbH, State Owned Company
- Industry: Oil and gas industry
- Founded: 1990; 36 years ago
- Headquarters: Berlin, Germany
- Area served: Europe, United States, Asia
- Key people: Dr Egbert Laege, Chief Executive Officer, Jan-Martin Nufer Chief Financial Officer
- Products: Natural gas, Electricity, Hydrogen
- Revenue: ▲EUR 8.03 billion (2009)
- Net income: EUR 496.5 million (2009)
- Number of employees: 2000
- Parent: German Federal Network Agency (April – December 2022) German Federal Government (2022-present)
- Website: www.sefe.eu

SEFE Securing Energy for Europe GmbH, registered in Berlin, Germany, is an international energy company, with entities operating in countries in Europe, Asia and North America. The company delivers around 200 terawatt hours (TWh) of natural gas annually to industry and other customers in Germany, the United Kingdom and seven other markets. As well as sales of gas and power, the company is also active in sourcing and trading, transportation and storage. The company owns significant gas pipeline networks in Europe and operates 25 per cent of Germany’s total gas storage capacity.

Under the former name Gazprom Germania GmbH, it was a 100% subsidiary of the world's largest natural gas company, Gazprom, from 1990 to 2022. In the aftermath of the Russian invasion of Ukraine in 2022, the company was placed under the trusteeship of Germany’s federal energy regulator—the Federal Network Agency—in April 2022. In December 2022 the company was nationalised and since then has been owned by the German Federal Government. The company is expected to be privatized by the end of 2028.

== General overview ==
SEFE’s activities span the energy value chain, from origination and trading to sales, transport and storage. Through its experience in trading and the development of its LNG business, SEFE has become a major suppliers to industrial customers in Europe, with an annual sales volume of 200 TWh of gas and power organisations. By investing in clean energies and especially in the hydrogen ecosystem, SEFE is contributing to the energy transition. Companies of the group operate in Europe, USA, Central Asia and Singapore.

Securing Energy for Europe’s wholly owned business entities include:

- SEFE Energy GmbH (formerly WINGAS), and SEFE Energy Ltd, which together form one sales organisation, supplying over 50,000 customers in Germany and six other European countries, with a sales volume of around 200 TWh.
- SEFE Storage GmbH (formerly astora), operates natural gas storage sites with a total capacity of 7 billion cubic meters, a quarter of Germany’s total gas storage capacity. Rehden is Germany’s largest storage site, with capacity of 4 billion cubic meters.
- SEFE Marketing and Trading Ltd sources and trades gas, power and environmental products. Since the company’s re-establishment as SEFE, it has sought to diversify the procurement portfolio. WIGA, a holding company for onshore gas pipelines Opal, Eugal and NEL. Overall WIGA operates 4,150 km of gas pipelines linking Germany to five neighbouring states. In September 2023, SEFE completed a deal to take full ownership of WIGA, purchasing the 50.02% shareholding previously held by joint venture partner Wintershall Dea.

Securing Energy for Europe owns shares in:

- Vemex s.r.o. (51%), located in Prague, and controlling about 10-12% of the Czech gas market.
- Gas Project Development Central Asia AG (50%).
- Wintershall Erdgas Handelshaus Zug AG (WIEH) (50%).
- ZMB (Schweiz) AG (100%).

== Nationalisation of Gazprom Germania and establishment of SEFE ==
European regulators (after the Russia-Ukraine gas dispute) insisted, foreign strategic energy supplies should operate under the EU law. Just as energies should be sold on the free market and not via direct contracts. Therefore, Gazprom was forced to set up a net of companies (middlemen) operating under EU law. During early 2022, Gazprom-associated gas storage facilities became unusually low. In late March 2022, Gazprom Group transferred ownership of Gazprom Germania which was then exited. The German authorities viewed the transfer as illegal for such critical infrastructure of the gas handling, and issued a legal order to control the assets of the former Gazprom Germania. The German Federal Network Agency was made trustee of the company.

In May 2022, Russia issued sanctions against Gazprom Germania and other gas companies.

In August 2022, the German government had created a company for the possible nationalisation of SEFE. The company was originally called VERONIKA Zweiunddreizigste Vermögensverwaltungsgesellschaft, but on June 3, it was renamed Securing Energy for Europe Holding GmbH (SEEHG).

On November 14, 2022, the Federal Ministry for Economic Affairs and Climate Action decreed that the company would immediately be nationalised and full ownership was transferred to the German state. This action was authorised by the European Commission.

== Activity since nationalisation and establishment as SEFE ==
Since the nationalisation of the company and its re-establishment as SEFE, the company has focused on developing alternative sources of supply to ensure security of supply in Germany and Europe.

Previously in June 2023, SEFE signed a 20-year contract for 2.25 million tonnes of LNG per year from US company Venture Global. In December 2023 SEFE and Equinor reached a deal for gas deliveries from Norway to Germany covering one third of total German industrial gas needs. The deal, reportedly worth around 50 billion euros, covers around10 billion cubic metres of gas supply a year from 2024 to 2034.

In 2024, SEFE has signed several deals for adiditional gas deliveries. In March, SEFE and Oman LNG agreed upon the delivery of 0.4 million tonnes of LNG annually between 2026 and 2029. Following a memorandum of understanding with ADNOC in March, SEFE signed a deal with the Abu Dhabi supplier in November. Starting in 2028, ADNOC will send an annual amount of one million tonnes of LNG over a period of 15 years to Germany. In addition, there have been contracts with US company ConocoPhillips for up to nine billion cubic meters of natural gas and with Angola LNG for half a million tons of LNG. "We would like to play a part in facilitating the transition to net zero and will prepare an offer to politics to play a role in developing the hydrogen economy," Laege said.

In March 2024 the company announced it would take full ownership of the gas transmission network holding company WIGA, buying out joint venture partner Wintershall Dea’s 50.02% stake. WIGA operates Opal, Eugal and NEL, in total 4,150 km of gas pipelines linking Germany to five neighbouring states. The takeover received European Commission approval in September 2024.

The company is considering investments in clean hydrogen transport and storage and plans a hydrogen pipeline. Called Flow, the pipeline planned by WIGA subsidiary Gascade, Terranets BW, and VNG-owned Ontras would have capacity of 20GW and be 1,200 km long. The company’s CEO has said that conversion of some of its pipelines and underground gas storage capacity for use for clean hydrogen could involve investments of around 500 million euros. In line with this, a recently agreed partnership with Eletrobras aims at importing 200,000 tonnes of green hydrogen from Brazil each year from 2030 onwards.

== Questions about activities ==
Roman Kupchinsky, who immigrated from a refugee camp in Austria to Brooklyn, NY, in 1949 and worked for the CIA, was the director of the Ukrainian Service of Radio Free Europe/Radio Liberty from 1989 to 2002. He was a partner in the risk analysis firm AZEast Group until his death in 2010. In his 2008 appearance before the U.S. Senate Foreign Relations Committee, overseen by Sen. Joe Biden, Kupchinsky testified:

Gazprom, with the silent support of the Kremlin has set up 50 or so middlemen companies, silently linked to Gazprom and scattered throughout Europe - such as the Centrex group of companies and the Gazprom Germania network - which do not add any value to the price of Russian gas being sold on European markets; yet they earn enormous sums of money which appears to simply vanish through shell companies in Cyprus and in Liechtenstein.

German investigations have raised concerns about past connections between senior managers in the company, the East German government, and the Stasi.

== Management ==
Until 2022, the CEO (Senior Managing Director, German: Hauptgeschäftsführer) of Gazprom Germania was Vladimir Kotenev (Russian: Владимир Котенев). Before being appointed the new head of the former Gazprom Germania, Kotenev worked in the Russian foreign service. From 2004 to 2010 Kotenev was the Russian ambassador to Germany.

Since June 2022, Egbert Laege is the CEO (Senior Managing Director, German: Hauptgeschäftsführer) of SEFE Securing Energy for Europe.
