= Dolgoprudny =

Town in Moscow Oblast, Russia

Dolgoprudny Долгопрудный
- Town
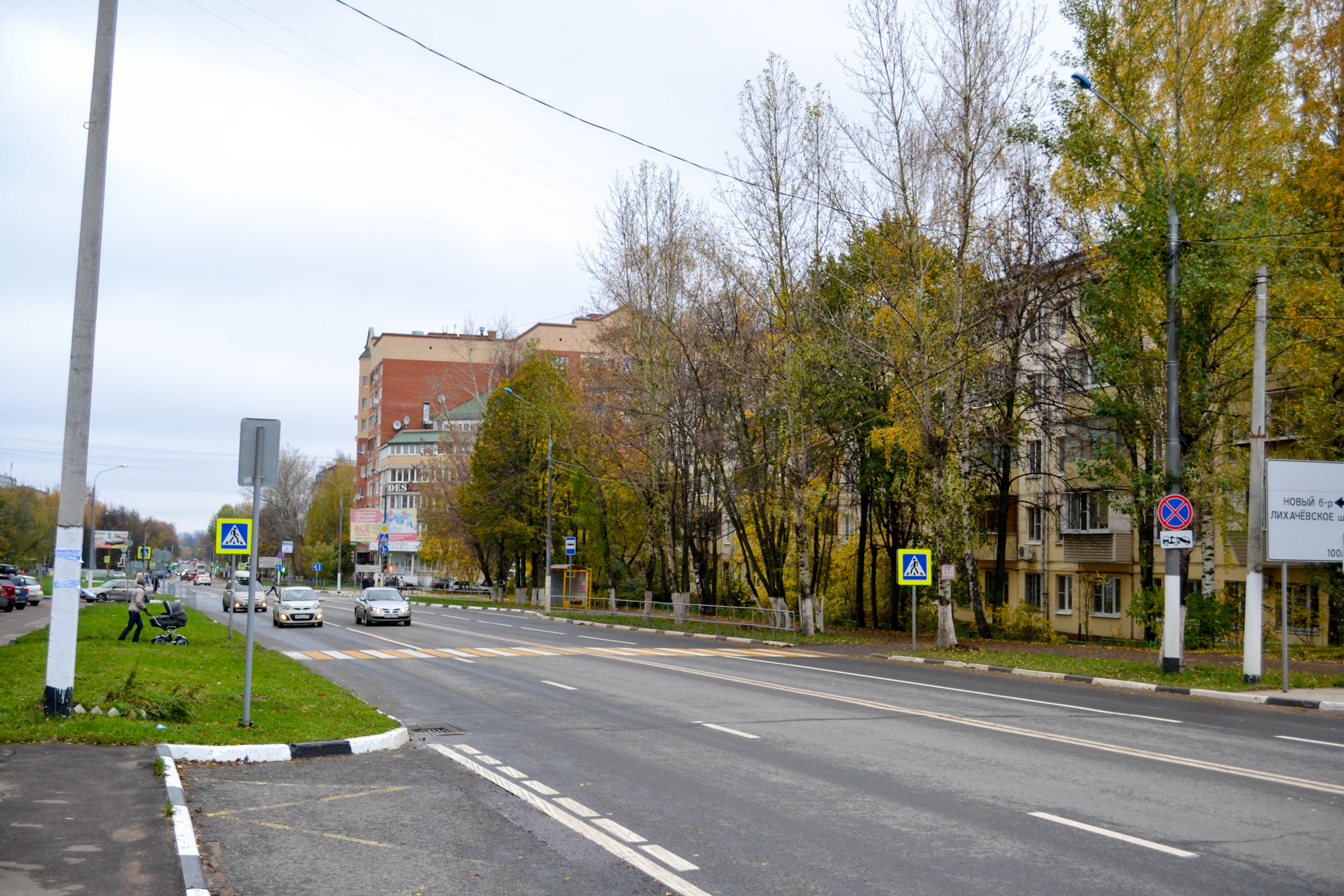
- A street in Dolgoprudny in 2016

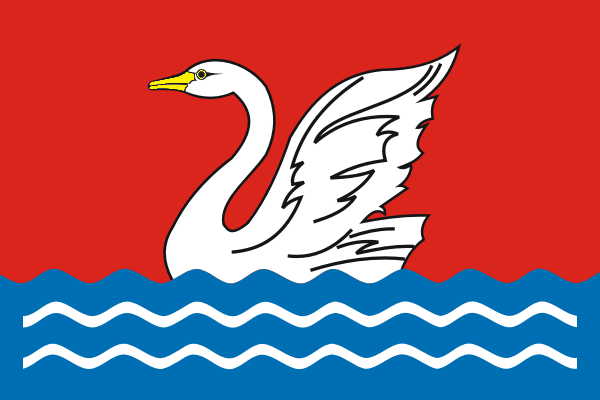
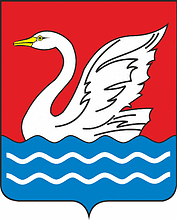
- Flag Coat of arms
- Interactive map of Dolgoprudny
- Location of Dolgoprudny Dolgoprudny (European Russia) Dolgoprudny (Europe)
- Coordinates: 55°56′N 37°30′E
- Country: Russia
- Federal subject: Moscow Oblast
- Founded: 1931
- Town status since: 1957

Government
  - Head: Roman Istomin
- Elevation: 180 m (590 ft)

Population (2010 Census)
  - Total: 90,956
  - Estimate (2025): 118,760 (+30.6%)
  - Rank: 187th in 2010

Administrative status
  - Subordinated to: Dolgoprudny Town Under Oblast Jurisdiction
  - Capital of: Dolgoprudny Town Under Oblast Jurisdiction

Municipal status
  - Urban okrug: Dolgoprudny Urban Okrug
  - Capital of: Dolgoprudny Urban Okrug
- Time zone: UTC+3 (MSK)
- Postal code: 141700
- Dialing code: +7 495
- OKTMO ID: 46716000001
- Website: www.dolgoprudny.com

Dolgoprudny (Russian: Долгопру́дный, Russian pronunciation: [dəlɡɐˈprudnɨj]) is a town in Moscow Oblast, Russia, located about 20 kilometers (12 mi) north of Moscow city center. The town's name is derived from Russian "Долгий пруд" (dolgy prud, lit. "long pond")—a long and narrow pond situated in the northeastern part of the town. The town's name is sometimes colloquially shortened as Dolgopa. Population: 120,907 (2021 census); 90,956 (2010 census); 68,792 (2002 census); 70,751 (1989 Soviet census).

== Geography ==
The territory of the town borders with Moscow in the south and in the east, Khimki in the southwest, and is limited by the Moscow Canal in the west and by the Klyazminskoye Reservoir in the north. The town can be reached by suburban train from the Savyolovsky Terminal of Moscow in about twenty minutes to one of the three platforms: Novodachnaya, Dolgoprudnaya, or Vodniki, or by bus shuttle from Khovrino and Altufyevo stations of the Moscow Metro. The Dmitrovskoye highway connecting Moscow with Dmitrov and Dubna passes just east of the town.

== History ==
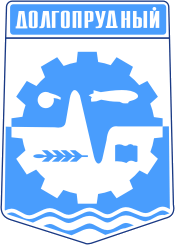
Coat of arms of Dolgoprudny in 1982-1997

A settlement of Vinogradovo situated in the place of the modern town was known at least since the 17th century. Then a railway was built in the 1900s (decade) and a railway platform was built in 1914. The settlement started to develop as an airship manufacturing plant was built there in 1931. The aeronautic engineer Umberto Nobile worked there for five years during the 1930s. For a few years during the 1930s, the settlement was renamed Dirizhablestroy (meaning "airship building"). In 1951, the famous Moscow Institute of Physics and Technology or Phystech, moved to Dolgoprudny, and a construction of its present campus started in the southern part of the town, inspired by the Nobel Prize winners Pyotr Kapitsa, Lev Landau, and Nikolay Semyonov. Town status was granted in 1957.

== Administrative and municipal status ==
Within the framework of administrative divisions, it is incorporated as Dolgoprudny Town Under Oblast Jurisdiction—an administrative unit with the status equal to that of the districts. As a municipal division, Dolgoprudny Town Under Oblast Jurisdiction is incorporated as Dolgoprudny Urban Okrug.

== Economy ==
Now the town has machinery-building, engineering, and chemical industries. It is being extensively developed with much commercial and residential construction due to its favorable location and following the growing demand for real estate in the suburbs of Moscow.

== Gallery ==
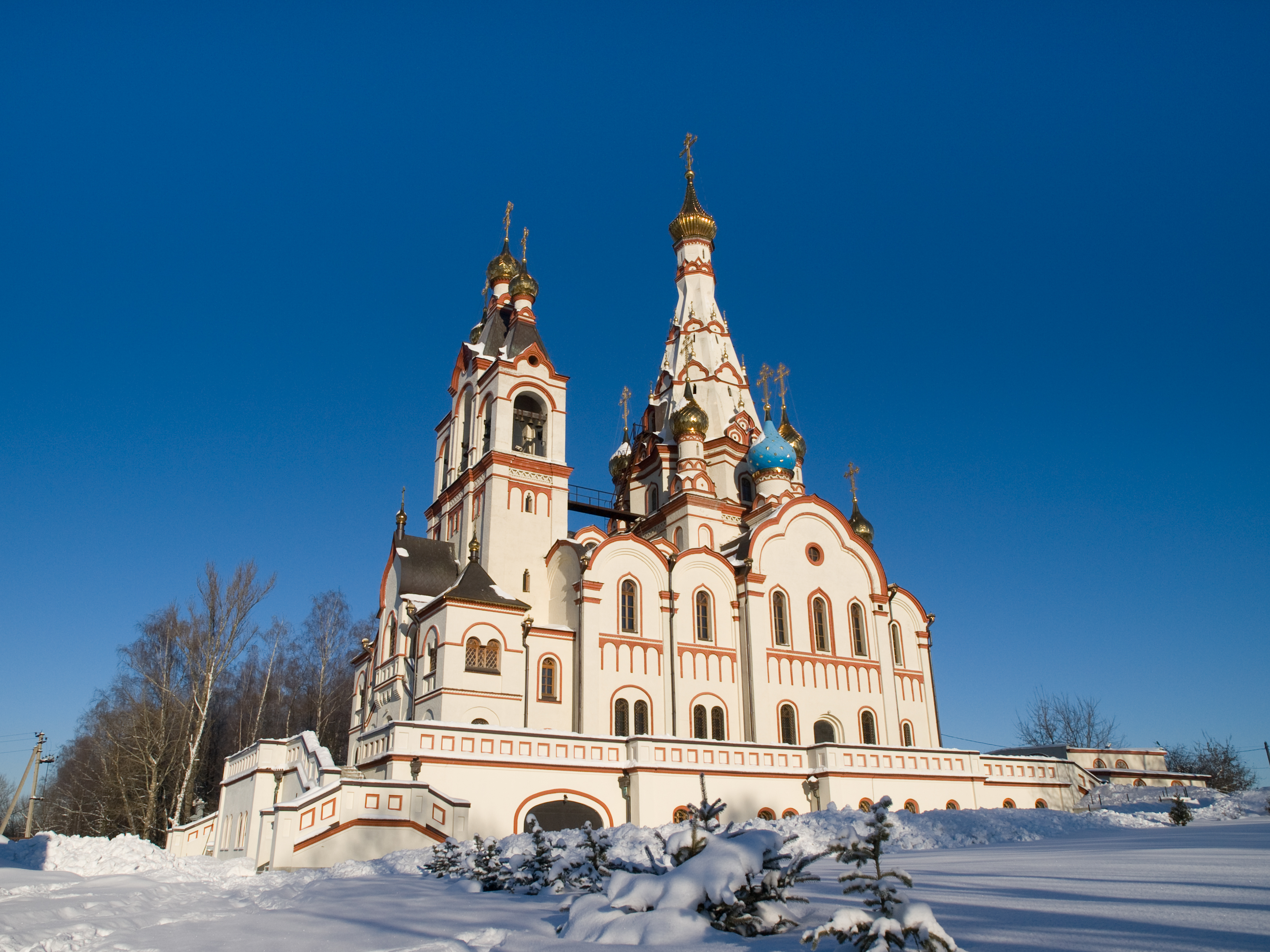
Church of the Theotokos of Kazan

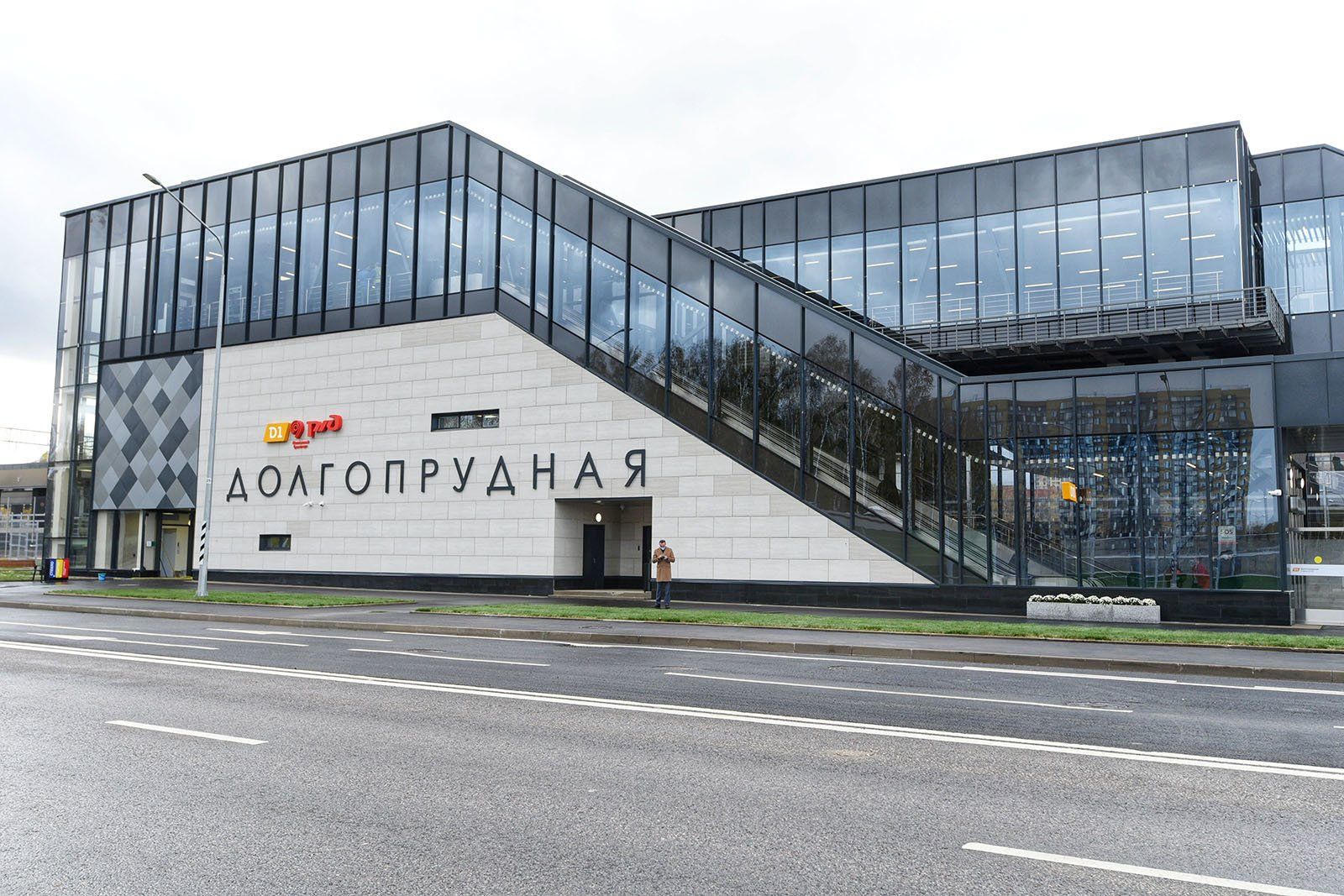
Dolgoprudnaya railway station

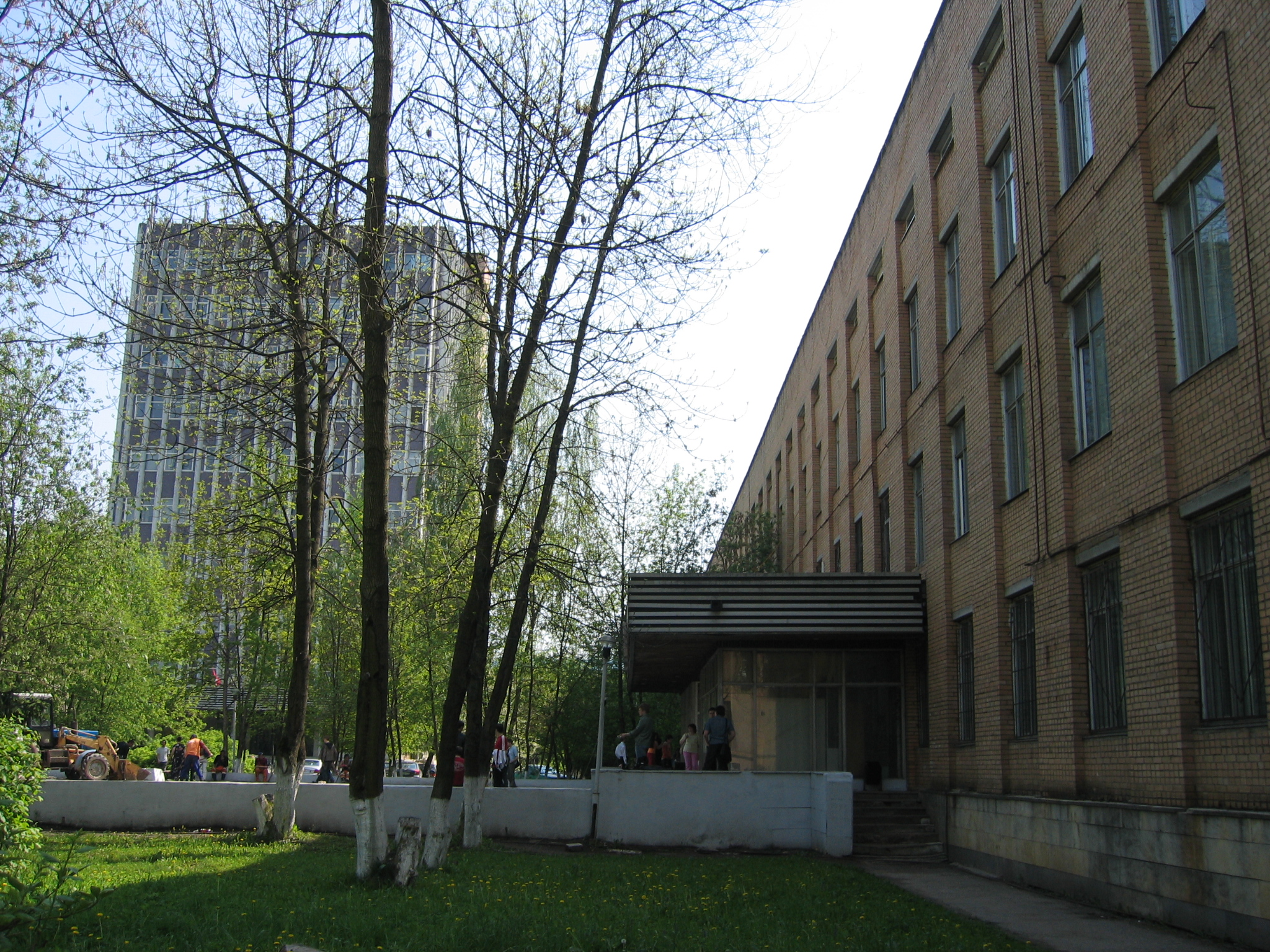
The campus of the Moscow Institute of Physics and Technology (Phystech)
