= Centrex Europe Energy & Gas =

Centrex Europe Energy and Gas AG is "an international group of companies operating in the natural gas sector, focussing on the extraction and marketing of natural gas reserves". It is believed to be a Gazprom front company.

An author suggests that the shadowy companies might be related to "means of silently funneling money for high level Russian and Austrian officials into Liechtenstein and other off-shore accounts".

A U.S. Senate testimony, overseen by Sen. Joe Biden, noted:

Gazprom, with the silent support of the Kremlin has set up 50 or so middlemen companies, silently linked to Gazprom and scattered throughout Europe - such as the Centrex group of companies and the Gazprom Germania network - which do not add any value to the price of Russian gas being sold on European markets; yet they earn enormous sums of money which appears to simply vanish through shell companies in Cyprus and in Liechtenstein.

== Owners ==
- GH Gas Holdings, Ltd. in Cyprus
- RN Privatstiftung in Austria — Robert Nowikovsky

== See also ==
- List of Gazprom's subsidiaries
