= Natural gas in Romania =

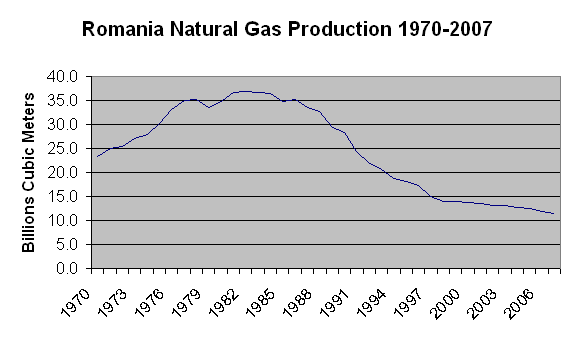
Natural gas production in Romania between 1970 and 2007

Romania has proven natural gas reserves of 726 billion cubic meters (25.94 trillion cubic feet) and is ranked 30th among countries with proved reserves of natural gas. About 75% of Romania's natural gas resources are located in Transylvania, especially in Mureș and Sibiu counties. The largest natural gas field in Romania is the Deleni gas field discovered in 1912 and located in Băgaciu commune, Mureș County, with proven reserves of 85 billion cubic meters or 3 trillion cubic feet. Other important gas fields include the Filitelnic gas field (40 bcm – 1,430 bcft), the Roman-Secuieni gas field (24 bcm – 850 bcft), the Voitinel gas field (11.8 bcm – 415 bcft), the Ghercești gas field (11 bcm – 400 bcft) and the Sărmașel gas field (10 bcm – 354 bcft) all with reserves larger than 10 billion cubic meters or 350 billion cubic feet. Currently Romania has the second largest natural gas reserves in the European Union just after the Netherlands.

== History ==
On the present-day territory of Romania, the first natural gas deposit was discovered in 1909, in Sărmășel, Mureș County (then in Austria-Hungary), further to geological researches on potassium salts. The first gas production was used to power the steam boilers in Sărmășel and the gas lighting of the alleys in Bazna resort. The first gas transmission pipeline was built in 1914 covering the 55 km (34 mi) between Sărmășel and Turda, with the last being the first city in Europe to have public street lights fueled by natural gas in 1916. In 1927 the first natural gas compression station in Europe was built in Sărmășel. Following the successful gas discovery many foreign companies started to prospect the territories including American, British, French and Austria-Hungarian companies. The American success in the exploitation and usage of natural gas determined the foundation of Societatea Maghiara de Gaz Metan UEG (Hungarian Methane Company) by the Hungarian Ministry of Finances and Deutsche Bank whose scope of activity was the exploration, exploitation, transmission, distribution and use of natural gas in certain regions within Transylvania. A prodigious period followed for the gas distribution business and the year 1941 marks the construction of the first natural gas pipeline from Mănești to Bucharest, while the following year a main pipeline is built for the transportation of natural gas from Transylvania to the capital city. After the unification of Transylvania and Romania in 1919 the Direcția gazului natural company is established at Cluj Napoca affiliated to the Ministry of Industry and Commerce in Bucharest, which later in 1925 was renamed to Societatea Națională de Gaz Metan SONAMETAN (National Methane Company). The first underground storage facility in Romania was built in 1958 at Ilimbav in Sibiu County and in 1959 Romania becomes the first natural gas exporter in Europe, the destination being Hungary. 1979 represents the beginning of natural gas imports in Romania from Russia then part of the Soviet Union.

== Production ==
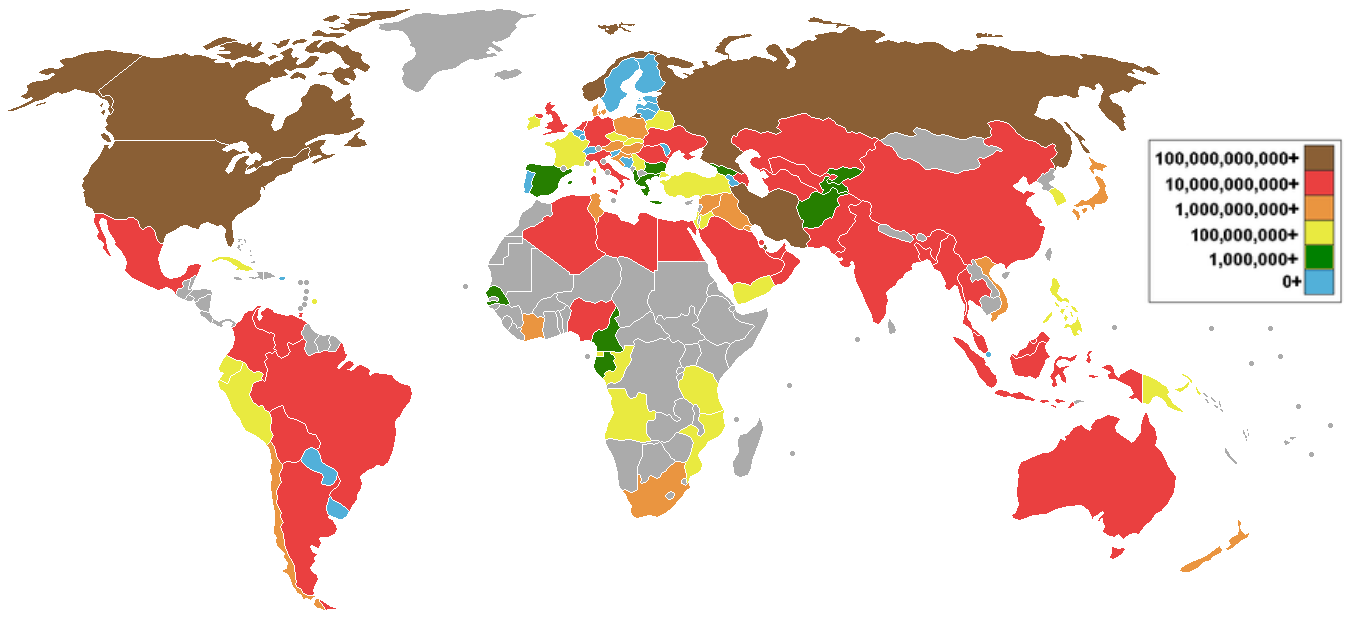
Natural gas production by countries (Romania in red) in cubic meters per year

The local natural gas production is dominated by two very large companies Romgaz with a market share of 51.25% and Petrom with a market share of 46.33%. There are also several smaller companies Aurelian Oil&Gas with a market share of 0.38%, Amromco with a market share of 1.85%, Lotus Petrol with a market share of 0.13% and Wintershall with a market share of 0.06%. In 2009 Romania produced around 11 billion cubic meters of natural gas (400 billion cubic feet) which represented 85% of all gas consumed in the country. Romania ranks third in the European Union in terms of natural gas production just after the Netherlands and Germany.

In 2009 the largest natural gas producer in Romania was Romgaz which produced 5.76 billion cubic meters (204 bcft), Petrom came second with around 5 billion cubic meters (177 bcft) and Aurelian Oil&Gas, Amromco, Lotus Petrol and Wintershall produced a combined 0.24 billion cubic meters (8.5 bcft). Around 62.5% of the total natural gas extracted in Romania in 2009 came from the Mureș County.

By 2025 the total natural gas production of Romania will almost double to 18–20 billion cubic meters (638–708 bcft) due to the commissioning of several new natural gas fields found in the continental shelf of the Black Sea. OMV Petrom and ExxonMobil owned Domino and Pelican South gas fields are expected to produce around 6 bcm (213 bcft) in 2021 and the Black Sea Oil and Gas's Ana, Doina and Midia Deep gas fields are expected to produce 1 bcm (35 bcft) in 2019.

== Future developments ==
Austria's Petrom and Romania are looking to develop the Neptun Deep gas field in the Black Sea at a cost of €4bn. The field has a potential of 10bn cubic metres per year as of 2027 but was held up in 2023 because of Austria's refusal to agree Romania's entry into the Schengen Area causing ill will between Romania and Austria. According to the Romanian Minister of Energy, Sebastian Burduja, given recent developments, Romania has the opportunity to become the largest gas producer in Europe.

== Storage ==
Romania has eight underground storage facilities with a combined capacity of 3 billion cubic meters (106 bcft). Of the eight, six are operated by Romgaz and two are operated by Depomureș and Amgaz. The Romgaz underground storage facilities have a combined capacity of 2.76 bcm (98 bcft). The storage facilities are located in Sărmășel and Cetatea de Baltă in Transylvania and in Bilciurești, Bălăceanca, Urziceni, and Ghercești in Southern Romania. The largest of the six storages is the Bilciurești facility located 40 km (25 mi) North – North – West of Bucharest having a storage capacity of 1.3 bcm (46 bcft) in one cycle and it is located at a depth of 2,000 m (6,600 ft).

Romgaz also has plans to increase the capacity of its underground storage facilities to around 4 bcm (142 bcft) by 2013. The company also signed a memorandum with Russian company Gazprom for the development of ten underground storage facilities with a maximum capacity of 5 billion cubic meters (177 bcft) of which 2 bcm (71 bcft) will be at the Roman-Mărgineni facility located in Bacău County. Other companies interested are GDF Suez who wants to develop an underground storage facility with a capacity of 0.5 billion cubic meters (18 bcft) and EGL Power who wants to develop an underground storage facility with a capacity of 0.3 billion cubic meters (11 bcft).

== Reserves ==
Romania has proven natural gas reserves of 630 billion cubic meters (22.94 Tcf) and is ranked 30th among countries with proved reserves of natural gas. Most of Romania's natural gas resources are located in Transylvania, Moldavia, Wallachia and the Black Sea with around 75% being located in Transylvania especially in Mureș and Sibiu counties. The most important natural gas fields in Transylvania are Abrămuț, Bazna, Bențid, Brădești, Copșa Mică, Cușmed, Deleni, Filitelnic, Firtușu, Ibănești, Laslău Mare, Salonta, Sărmașel, Sighișoara, Șamșud, and Zau de Câmpie. The most important natural gas fields in Moldavia are Bătrânești, Berbinceni, Bilca, Brodina, Gherăiești, Roman-Secuieni, and Voitinel. The most important natural gas fields in Wallachia are Bobocu, Boldești-Scăeni, Bustuchin, Ghercești, Grădiștea, Mamu, Mănești-Vlădeni and Torcești. The most important natural gas fields in the Black Sea are Ana, Doina, Lebăda Est, Lebăda Vest, Pescăruș and Sinoe.

The largest natural gas field in Romania is the Deleni gas field discovered in 1912 and located in the Băgaciu commune in Mureș County with proven reserves of 85 billion cubic meters or 3 trillion cubic feet. Other important gas fields include the Filitelnic gas field (40 bcm – 1,430 bcft), Roman-Secuieni gas field (24 bcm – 850 bcft), the Voitinel gas field (11.8 bcm – 415 bcft), the Ghercești gas field (11 bcm – 400 bcft) and the Sărmașel gas field (10 bcm – 354 bcft) all with reserves larger than 10 billion cubic meters or 350 billion cubic feet.

The natural gas reserves located in the Romanian section of the continental shelf of the Black Sea are estimated at 200 billion cubic meters or 7 trillion cubic feet.

== Transmission system ==
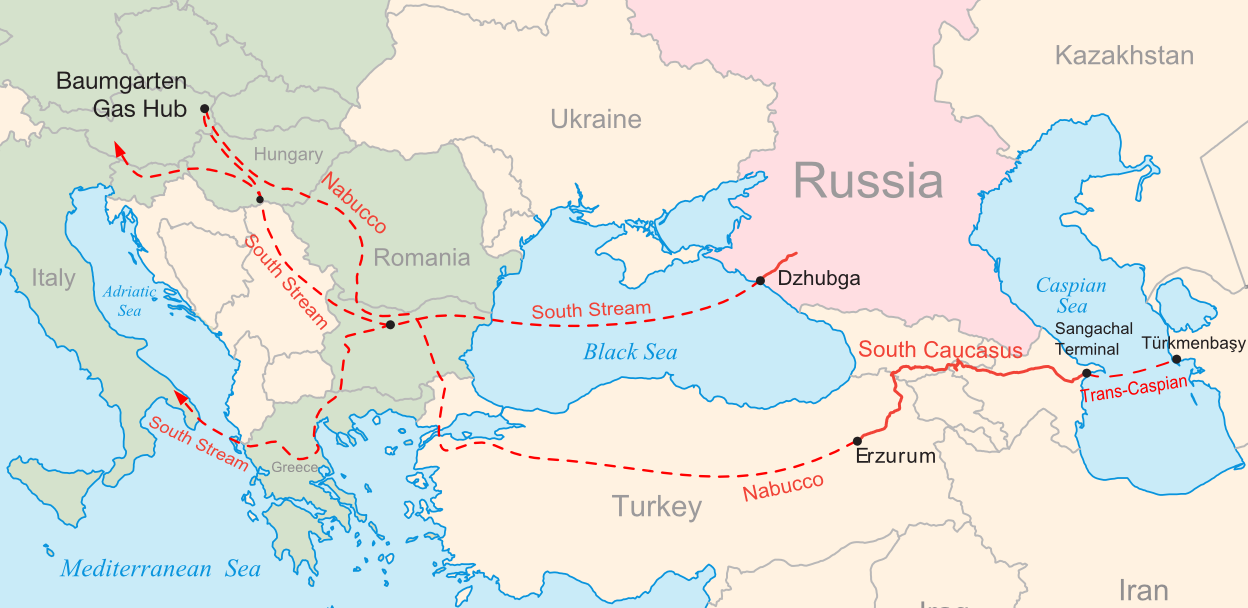
Map of the South Stream and Nabucco natural gas transportation pipelines

The national natural gas transmission system in Romania is owned by Transgaz a state-owned company. It has a total network length of 13,110 km (8,150 mi) of pipelines with diameters between 50 mm (2.0 in) and 1,200 mm (47 in). The company also owns a 50% stake in the Arad–Szeged pipeline, a natural gas pipeline from Arad in Romania to Szeged in Hungary, with a length of 109 km (68 mi) and a transport capacity of 4.4 billion cubic meters (0.15 Tcf) per year, a 16.67% stake in the Nabucco pipeline, a natural gas pipeline from Erzurum in Turkey to Baumgarten an der March in Austria, with a length of 3,300 km (2,100 mi) and a transport capacity of 31 billion cubic meters (1.1 Tcf), a 50% stake in the Giurgiu–Ruse pipeline, a natural gas pipeline from Giurgiu in Romania to Ruse in Bulgaria, with a length of 190 km (120 mi) and a transport capacity of 2 billion cubic meters (0.07 Tcf) per year, and a 33% stake in the Azerbaijan–Georgia–Romania Interconnector a project to transport Azerbaijani natural gas to Romania via tankers over the Black Sea. The national natural gas transmission system has an annual transport capacity of 30 billion cubic meters (1.05 Tcf).

Romania also has four other pipeline links to Ukraine used for the import or transit of natural gas. One of the pipelines enters the country at Medieșu Aurit in Satu Mare County in the North - West of the country. This pipeline has a transport capacity of 4 billion cubic meters (0.14 Tcf) per year. The other pipelines are used mainly for transit and enter the country at Isaccea in Tulcea County and exit at Negru Vodă in Constanța County. The first of the pipelines was built in 1974, the second in 1986 and the third in 1996. The pipelines have a length of 190 km (120 mi) each and a combined transport capacity of 28 billion cubic meters (0.98 Tcf). They are used to supply natural gas to Bulgaria, Greece, North Macedonia and Turkey. Romania earns around €60 million per year from transit fees from these pipelines.
