= Nabucco pipeline =

Proposed natural gas pipeline from the Turkish-Bulgarian border to Austria

- Proposed location of the Nabucco pipeline

Location
- Country: Turkey, Bulgaria, Romania, Hungary, Austria
- Direction: East–West
- Start: Ahiboz, Turkey
- Passes through: İnegöl, Yuluce, Kırklareli, Kofcas, Lozenets, Oryahovo, Port of Bechet, Nădlac, Dolj, Mehedinți, Caraș-Severin, Timiș, and Arad
- To: Baumgarten an der March, Austria

General information
- Type: Natural gas
- Partners: OMV; MOL; Transgaz; Bulgargaz; BOTAŞ; RWE
- Operator: Nabucco Gas Pipeline International GmbH

Technical information
- Length: 3,893 km (2,419 mi)
- Maximum discharge: 31 billion cubic metres (1.1×10^{12} cu ft) per year
- Diameter: 56 in (1,422 mm)

Nabucco-West
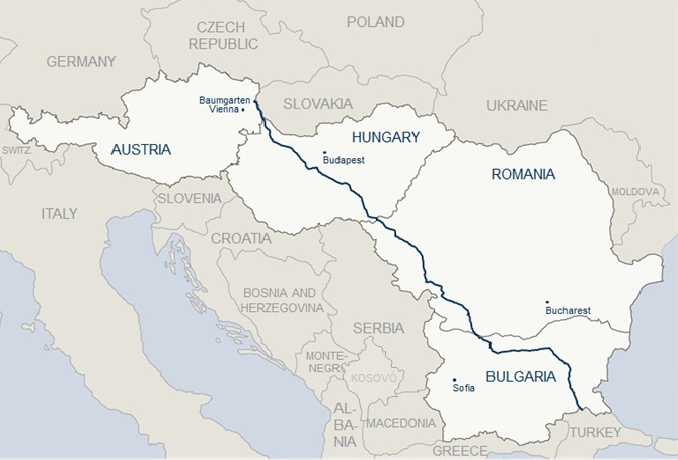
- Map of Nabucco-West

Location
- Country: Bulgaria, Romania, Hungary, Austria
- Direction: east–west
- Start: Strandzha, Bulgaria
- Passes through: Lozenets, Oryahovo, Port of Bechet, Nădlac, Dolj, Mehedinți, Caraș-Severin, Timiș, and Arad
- To: Baumgarten an der March, Austria

General information
- Type: Natural gas
- Partners: BOTAŞ (Turkey); BEH (Bulgaria); FGSZ (Hungary); OMV (Austria); Transgaz (Romania)
- Operator: Nabucco Gas Pipeline International GmbH
- Expected: 2018

Technical information
- Length: 1,329 km (826 mi)
- Maximum discharge: 10 to 23 billion cubic metres per year
- Diameter: 48 in (1,219 mm)

The Nabucco pipeline (also referred as Turkey–Austria gas pipeline) was a failed natural gas pipeline project from Erzurum, Turkey, to Baumgarten an der March, Austria to diversify natural gas suppliers and delivery routes for Europe. The pipeline was to lessen European dependence on Russian energy. The project was backed by several European Union states and the United States and was seen as a rival to the Gazprom-Eni South Stream pipeline project. The main supplier was to be Iraq with potential supplies from Azerbaijan, Turkmenistan, and Egypt.

The project was developed by a consortium of six companies. Preparations started in 2002 and the intergovernmental agreement among Turkey, Romania, Bulgaria, Hungary and Austria was signed on 13 July 2009. After an announcement of the construction of TANAP, the consortium submitted the Nabucco-West project, which was to run from the Turkish-Bulgarian border to Austria. It was a modification of the original Nabucco Pipeline project. The main supply for Nabucco-West was to be the Shah Deniz gas through the now operational Trans-Anatolian Pipeline (TANAP). After the Shah Deniz consortium decided to prefer the Trans-Adriatic Pipeline over Nabucco, the Nabucco pipeline plan was finally aborted in June 2013.

== Motivation ==
The Nabucco project was backed by the European Union and the United States. In the Trans-European Networks – Energy programme, the Nabucco pipeline is designated as a project of strategic importance. An objective of the project is to connect the European Union better to the natural gas sources in the Caspian Sea and the Middle East regions. The project has been driven by the intention to diversify its current energy supplies, and to lessen European dependence on Russian energy—the biggest supplier of gas to Europe. The Russia–Ukraine gas disputes have been one of the factors driving the search for alternative suppliers, sources, and routes. Moreover, as per the European Commission, Europe's gas consumption is expected to increase from 502 billion cubic meters, in 2005, to 815 billion cubic meters in 2030, which would mean Russia alone would not be able to meet the demand.

South Eastern Europe is important as many of the regions are heavily dependent on Russian gas imports. Nabucco aims to diversify the gas supply to increase competition and security. Simon Pirani, senior research fellow, Oxford Institute for Energy Studies presented to delegates at the Ukrainian Energy Forum in 2013 a list of prices from the Russian newspaper Izvestia: "What they show is the prices at which Russian gas is being purchased in different European countries, and this tells quite a simple story. If you're in Eastern Europe, and you are quite heavily dependent on Russian gas, you pay more than $500/TCM; if you're in the UK, where we have a pretty much complete domination of gas-to-gas market, you pay $300, or $370+ in Germany, which is somewhere in between."

== History ==
Preparations for the Nabucco project started in February 2002 when first talks took place between Austrian OMV and Turkish BOTAŞ. In June 2002, five companies (OMV of Austria, MOL Group of Hungary, Bulgargaz of Bulgaria, Transgaz of Romania and BOTAŞ of Turkey) signed a protocol of intention to construct the Nabucco pipeline. The protocol followed by the cooperation agreement in October 2002. The name Nabucco comes from the same famous opera of Giuseppe Verdi, which was given to the project in the very early phases by Lutfu Atasoy (a consultant to Erdemir Engineering Company in connection with BOTAŞ) in a request for inquiry for pipeline engineering services to Kent plc. Atasoy wanted to shorten the original verbose project name, and decided to suggest Nabucco, which he had been listening to throughout his car ride on the way to the meeting with the General Manager of Erdemir Engineering Company at the time. This arbitrary suggestion has interestingly gained lots of popularity since, likely causing the five partners to attend a live premiere of the opera at the Vienna State Opera. In December 2003, the European Commission awarded a grant in the amount of 50% of the estimated total eligible cost of the feasibility study including market analysis, and technical, economic and financial studies. On 28 June 2005, the joint venture agreement was signed by five Nabucco partners. The ministerial statement on the Nabucco pipeline was signed on 26 June 2006 in Vienna. On 12 September 2007, Jozias van Aartsen was nominated by the European Commission as the Nabucco project coordinator. In February 2008, German RWE became a shareholder of the consortium.

On 11 June 2008, the first contract to supply gas from Azerbaijan through the Nabucco pipeline to Bulgaria was signed. The President of Azerbaijan Ilham Aliyev confirmed on 29 January 2009, that Azerbaijan was planning to at least double its gas production in the coming five years to supply the pipeline. On 12 April 2009, the Minister of Energy of Turkey Hilmi Güler confirmed that Turkey is ready to sign a deal, provided that Turkey gets 15% of the natural gas to be carried through the Nabucco pipeline.

On 27 January 2009, the Nabucco Summit held in Budapest. On 24–25 April 2009, the Nabucco pipeline was discussed, among other energy issues, at the high-level energy summit in Sofia, and on 8 May 2009, at the Southern Corridor Summit in Prague.

The intergovernmental agreement between Turkey, Romania, Bulgaria, Hungary and Austria was signed by five prime ministers on 13 July 2009 in Ankara. The European Union was represented at the ceremony by the President Jose Manuel Barroso and the Commissioner for Energy Andris Piebalgs, and the United States was represented by Special Envoy for Eurasian Energy Richard Morningstar and Ranking Member of the United States Senate Committee on Foreign Relations Senator Richard Lugar. Hungary ratified the agreement on 20 October 2009. Bulgaria ratified the agreement on 3 February 2010. Romania ratified the agreement on 16 February 2010. Turkey became the final country ratifying the agreement on 4 March 2010.

The legal framework set up by the intergovernmental agreement was strengthened further with the signing in 2011 of the Project Support Agreements (PSAs) between Nabucco and each of the Transit countries. The main elements of the PSAs are the affirmation of an advantageous regulatory transit regime under EU law; the protection of the Nabucco Pipeline from potential discriminatory changes in the law; and support for legislative and administrative actions for the further implementation of the project.

In May 2012, the Nabucco consortium submitted a Nabucco-West proposal to the Shah Deniz consortium. On 10 January 2013, Nabucco International and Shah Deniz partners signed a funding agreement. According to the agreement, Shah Deniz partners will take a 50% stake in the project if chosen as an export route for the Shah Deniz gas. On 3 March 2013, Nabucco International signed a memorandum of understanding with the TANAP consortium. However, on 28 June 2013 Shah Deniz consortium announced that it had chosen the Trans Adriatic Pipeline over Nabucco for its gas exports, prompting OMV CEO Gerhard Roiss to regard the Nabucco project as "over".

== Route ==
The original 3,893 kilometres (2,419 mi) long pipeline was to run from Ahiboz in Turkey via Bulgaria, Romania, and Hungary to Baumgarten an der March, a major natural gas hub in Austria. In Ahiboz, it would be joined with two feeder lines, one connecting to Georgia in the north (South Caucasus Pipeline), and the other connecting to Iraq (pipeline to be built) in the southeast. It would be fed also from the Tabriz–Ankara pipeline. 2,730 kilometres (1,700 mi) of the pipeline was to be laid in Turkey, 412 kilometres (256 mi) in Bulgaria, 469 kilometres (291 mi) in Romania, 384 kilometres (239 mi) in Hungary, and 47 kilometres (29 mi) in Austria.

The modified Nabucco West was to start from the Turkey–Bulgaria border and further to follow the original route. The total length of Nabucco West is 1,329 kilometres (826 mi), with the following distances in each of the below countries:

- Bulgaria: 424 kilometres (263 mi)
- Romania: 475 kilometres (295 mi)
- Hungary: 383 kilometres (238 mi)
- Austria: 47 kilometres (29 mi)

From Turkey, the original Nabucco pipeline was proposed to enter Bulgaria and after running 76 kilometres (47 mi) in parallel to the existing gas system connect to the Bulgarian national gas network at the compressor station of village Lozenets in Yambol Province. After crossing the Balkan Range, the pipeline will head 116.3 kilometres (72.3 mi) in a northwesterly direction. After reaching the national northern half-ring, it will run 133 kilometres (83 mi) in parallel to the existing east–west gas line and continue 86.5 kilometres (53.7 mi) to northwest before reaching the Danube at Oryahovo. In Bulgaria, Nabucco will have interconnections with the national gas network and will have two off-take systems, compressor stations and pig stations.

In Romania, the pipeline would be crossing into the country under the Danube. The route on the Romanian territory would go from south-west to north-west, its south-western starting point being located at the Danube-crossing point upstream the Port of Bechet, and the north-western end point being located north of Nădlac. The pipe would follow the south western border of Romania and will travel through the counties of Dolj, Mehedinți, Caraș-Severin, Timiș, and Arad. The pipeline would cross 11 protected sites, two national parks, three natural reserves, and 57 watercourses, namely major rivers such as: Jiu, Coșuștea, Cerna, Belareca, Timiș, Bega, and Mureș, as well as their tributaries. The terrain is rockier in Romania and mainly composed of limestone. This section is 469 kilometres (291 mi) long.

Polish gas company PGNiG was studying the possibility of building a link from the Nabucco gas pipeline to Poland.

== Technical features ==
The Nabucco-West was to be exempt from regulated third party access, including tariff regulation, for 25 years. Its proposal stated a capacity of 10 billion cubic metres (350 billion cubic feet) per year. This capacity will be scaled up to 23 billion cubic metres (810 billion cubic feet) to compensate for an anticipated increase in demand. Nabucco West would offer 50% of its transport capacity to third parties outside of the shareholders.

== Construction ==
The Nabucco project was included in the EU Trans-European Energy Network programme and a feasibility study for the Nabucco pipeline had been performed under an EU project grant. The front end engineering and design (FEED) services of the pipeline, including the overall management of the local FEED contractors, the review of the technical feasibility study, route confirmation, preparation of the design basis, hydraulic studies, overall SCADA and telecommunications, GIS and preparation of tender packages for the next phase, was managed by UK-based consultancy Penspen. Starting from 14 December 2011, WorleyParsons was appointed as on owner's engineer.

On 28 January 2013, it was announced that a re-feed for the Nabucco West project was being conducted by Saipem following the selection of the project as the Central European route by the Shah Deniz consortium in June last year. This work will build upon existing engineering work already completed for the Nabucco classic route.

According to Reinhard Mitschek, managing director of Nabucco Gas Pipeline International GmbH, construction of the pipeline was scheduled to begin in 2013 and would become operational by 2017. However, in June 2013, the Shah Deniz Consortium had chosen a rival project, Trans Adriatic Pipeline, that has a route Turkey–Greece-Albania-Italy, and the future of Nabucco project is unclear.

== Financing ==
The pipelines costs are undisclosed, however Reinhard Mitschek said in late 2012 that the costs of Nabucco West would be far lower than €7.9 billion previously suggested. The final investment decision was expected in 2013. The sources of financing of the Nabucco project are not decided yet. As a commercial project, it will be financed 30% by the project's partners and the rest by commercial financial instruments. The European Commission has awarded an EU project grant in the amount of 50% of the estimated total eligible cost of the feasibility study and has also decided to allocate €200 million from the European Economic Recovery Plan. To receive this financing, this grant should be committed by the end 2010.

At the Nabucco Summit held in Budapest on 27 January 2009, the heads of the European Investment Bank (EIB) and the European Bank for Reconstruction and Development (EBRD) confirmed, that they are prepared to provide financial backing for the project. On 5 February 2010, the EIB vice-president Mathias Kollatz-Ahnensaid that Nabucco consortium was seeking up to €2 billion (20–25% of costs) in bank financing. The EIB was ready to participate in the financing of this project; however, the precondition was that the partner countries should legally approve the pipeline's transit in their countries.

In September 2010, the consortium signed an agreement with EIB, EBRD, and the International Finance Corporation (IFC), according to which the banks will conduct due diligence for a financing package of €4 billion. Up to €2 billion will be signed by the EIB, up to €1.2 billion by the EBRD, and up to €800 million by the IFC. All figures listed above relate to the original Nabucco Project. Updated figures for Nabucco West are undisclosed as of June 2013. Reinhard Mitschek, Managing Director of Nabucco said in an interview with Natural Gas Europe in May 2013 that "Nabucco is continuing to cooperate with the International Financial Institutions to ensure the bankability of the project, a large part of the legal due diligence has already been completed. A Letter of Intent has been signed with the IFIs most recently". In a separate interview in February 2013, Mitschek confirmed that all legal and regulatory framework approved for the original Nabucco project would remain valid for Nabucco West.

== Supply sources ==
The potential suppliers for original Nabucco project were considered to be Iraq, Azerbaijan, Turkmenistan, and Egypt. At the first stage, 10 billion cubic metres (350 billion cubic feet) of natural gas per year were expected from Iraq. Iraqi gas would be imported via the Arab Gas Pipeline (extension to be built) from the Ekas field. Turkmenistan would provide 10 billion cubic metres (350 billion cubic feet) of gas per year through Iran or across the Caspian Sea via the planned Trans-Caspian Gas Pipeline. OMV and RWE set up a joint venture, named the Caspian Energy Company, to carry out research for a gas pipeline across the Caspian Sea. In the long term, Kazakhstan may become a supplier providing natural gas from the Northern Caspian reserves through the planned Trans-Caspian Gas Pipeline.

Egypt could provide 3–5 billion cubic metres (110×10^{9}–180×10^{9} cu ft) of natural gas through the Arab Gas Pipeline. Prime Minister of Turkey Recep Tayyip Erdoğan has urged Egypt to export natural gas to Europe via the Nabucco pipeline. Iran has also proposed to supply gas to Nabucco pipeline and this was backed by Turkey; however, due to the political conditions this is rejected by the EU and the United States.

Nabucco-West is designated to carry Azeri gas from the second stage of Shah Deniz through TANAP pipeline. The pipeline is able to transport between 10 – 23 BCM annually from the Shah Deniz gas field. OMV, a shareholder in Nabucco, also suggested that Nabucco will be used to transport gas from its Domino-1 deep-sea offshore well in the Black Sea. The Domino-1 well was OMV's largest gas find with 1.5 – 3 trillion cubic feet announced in February 2012.

== Project company ==
The project was developed by the Vienna-registered Nabucco Gas Pipeline International GmbH. The managing director of the company was Reinhardt Mitschek.

The shareholders of the company are:

- BOTAŞ (Turkey)
- BEH (Bulgaria)
- FGSZ (wholly owned subsidiary of MOL) (Hungary)
- OMV (Austria)
- Transgaz (Romania)

Nabucco International is the owner of the five national Nabucco companies responsible for the operation and maintenance of the pipeline in their respective countries.

RWE left the project and on 1 March 2013 OMV took over all of RWE's shares. On 28 May 2013, it was announced that GDF Suez, a French utilities provider, agreed to buy a 9% stake from OMV.

== Alternative projects ==
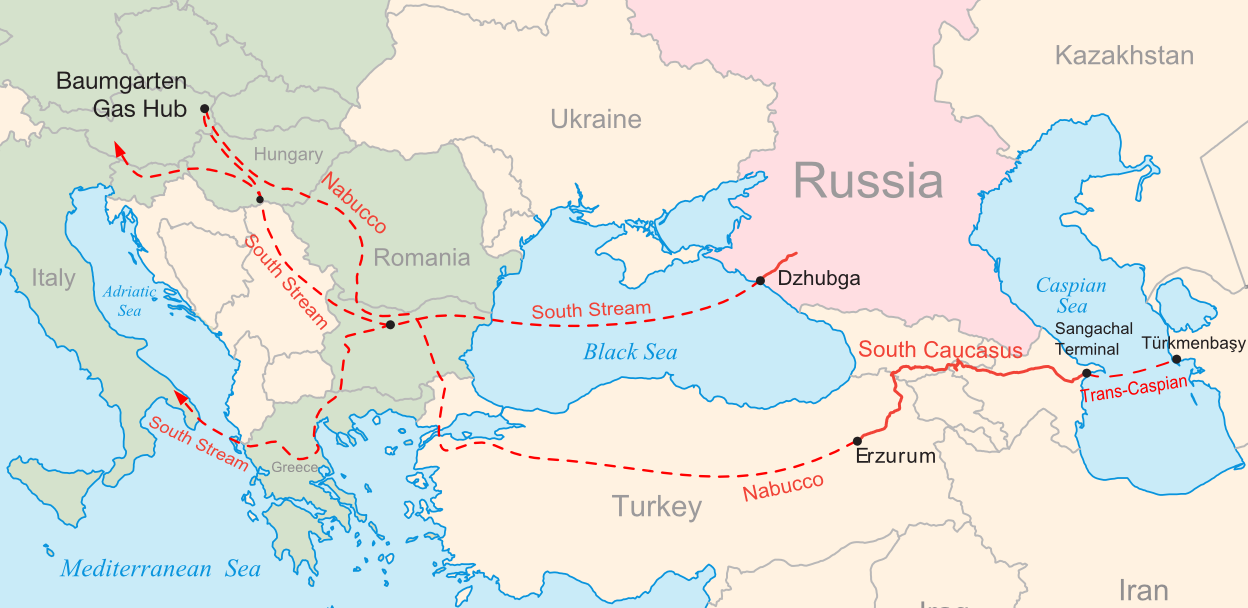
Map of Nabucco and TANAP

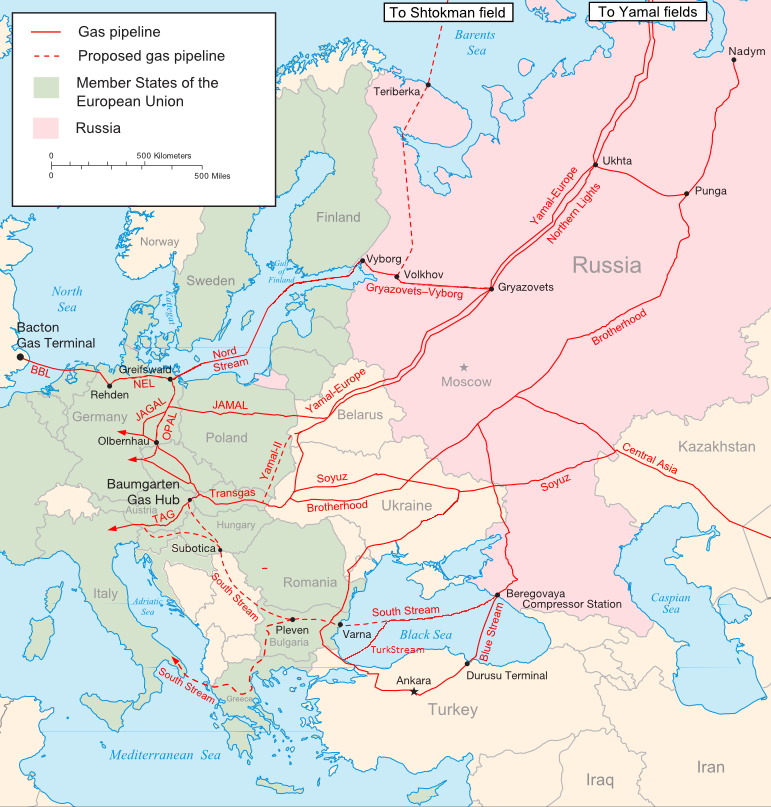
Major existing and planned natural gas pipelines supplying Russian gas to Europe

The main competitor for the original project was South Stream. In 2006, Gazprom proposed an alternative project, in competition with the Nabucco pipeline, that would involve constructing a second section of the Blue Stream pipeline beneath the Black Sea to Turkey, and extending this up through Bulgaria and Serbia to western Hungary. In 2007, instead the South Stream project through Bulgaria, Serbia, Hungary and Slovenia to Austria and Italy was proposed. On 10 March 2010, CEO of Eni, a partner in South Stream, Paolo Scaroni proposed to merge Nabucco and South Stream projects to "reduce investments, operational costs and increase overall returns". This proposal was rejected by energy minister of Russia Sergei Shmatko saying that "South Stream is more competitive than Nabucco" and that "Nabucco and South Stream are far from being competitors". According to Nobuo Tanaka, former executive director of the International Energy Agency, the Nabucco pipeline would be more effective in increasing Europe's energy security than the South Stream project as it would increase the number of gas suppliers.

Even more important competitor became TANAP which would follow the Nabucco's original route in Turkey. Therefore, Nabucco consortium modified the project and sees the modified Nabucco-West as a prolongation of TANAP into Central Europe. Nabucco West competed with the Trans Adriatic Pipeline and the Interconnector Turkey–Greece–Italy projects.

Also liquefied natural gas was seen as competitor to Nabucco and to pipeline projects in general. Azerbaijan, Georgia, Romania and Hungary are developing Azerbaijan–Georgia–Romania Interconnector project, which is proposed to transport Azerbaijani gas to Europe in form of LNG. Increasing availability of LNG from large gas-producing countries in the Middle-East and Africa stresses the economic viability of pipelines.

== Controversial aspects ==
=== Economic and political aspects ===
The Nabucco pipeline would supply only a limited number of countries in South-East and Central Europe. In 2013, it was confirmed by Bulgarian President Rosen Plevneliev that the pipeline would transport gas to a minimum of 16 European countries including the gas hub in Baumgarten, Austria. The project has been criticized as uneconomic because there is no guarantee that there will be sufficient gas supplies to make it profitable. The Nabucco Gas Pipeline project, although initially intending to secure gas from Iraq and Iran has readjusted its intentions given the current political and economic instabilities in the two countries. It will initially transport 10 BCM from the Shah Deniz gas field with the ability to increase its capacity to 23 BCM as demand increases, along with supply. One region that could also supply additional gas is the Black Sea, with OMV and ExxonMobil announcing an enormous gas discovery in February 2012.

The deputy chairman of the Russia's State Duma Energy Committee Ivan Grachev has questioned the viability of the Nabucco project and sees it as an attempt to put pressure on Russia. This is supported by Russia's gas deals with Azerbaijan and Turkmenistan, which by some observers has been seen as attempt to reserve potential Nabucco supplies. Azerbaijan has stated that the gas will be transported only through those routes, which would be commercially most attractive. Also the opening of the Central Asia – China gas pipeline and the agreements to build the South Stream pipeline has been seen as the end of Nabucco project.

However, before the rise of project's costs and the proposal of modified project, RWE had claimed that the transportation of natural gas through the Nabucco pipeline would be cheaper than through South Stream or other alternative pipelines. According to RWE, the transportation of thousand cubic meters of gas from Shah Deniz field to Europe will cost through the Nabucco pipeline €77 versus €106 through the South Stream pipeline. Russian opposition to the pipeline stems from their monopoly over European gas supplies. The Pipeline would lead to cheaper more secure gas supplies for the whole of Europe, due to the decreased influence of the oil linked gas price, this would provide economic benefits to the EU with cheaper energy helping the union become more competitive.

NGOs have also criticized the fact that the pipeline results in effective support of the authoritarian regime in Turkmenistan, which undermines the European Union's policy of human rights promotion.

=== Fossil fuels ===
Some NGOs criticize the EIB and EBRD for their willingness to finance a fossil fuel project, claiming that it goes against the November 2007 resolution on trade and climate change passed in the European Union Parliament. The resolution calls for "the discontinuation of public support via export credit agencies and public investment banks, for fossil fuel projects." Non-governmental organizations also show disapproval, due to the public banks decision to be lenient to Turkmenistan Human and civil rights conditions.

=== Security aspects ===
Concerns have been raised about the safety of the project. Gas for the Nabucco pipeline coming from Azerbaijan and Turkmenistan will have to pass near areas of instability in the South Caucasus.

== Reasons of failure ==
The failure of the Nabucco project is attributed to a combination of factors: the project's economic impracticality, the inability to secure reliable gas supplies from Turkmenistan due to the undefined legal status of the Caspian Sea, and fierce competition from Russia's rival project. Moscow was able to safeguard its dominant market share in Central and Eastern Europe and then pressured most of these countries to support Gazprom’s South Stream pipeline, a rival to Nabucco. Nabucco pipeline lacked the necessary political and diplomatic support from both the EU and the United States to overcome pressures from Russia and Gazprom.

== See also ==
- Interconnector Turkey–Greece–Italy
- South Caucasus Pipeline
- Trans-Caspian Gas Pipeline
- New Europe Transmission System
- Nord Stream
- 2009 Russia–Ukraine gas dispute
