= Penspen =

British engineering and management service company

- Industry: Engineering, Energy
- Headquarters: Holborn, London, United Kingdom
- Number of locations: 10+ Offices Worldwide
- Key people: Peter O'Sullivan (CEO)
- Website: www.penspen.com

Penspen designs, maintains, and optimises global energy infrastructure to improve access to secure and sustainable energy for millions of people across the Middle East, Africa, Europe, UK, and Latin America.

Penspen has been providing engineering, project management, asset management, and integrity services to the energy industry worldwide for more than 70 years and has now grown to employ more than 1,700 specialists, with offices in the United Kingdom, the United Arab Emirates, the Kingdom of Saudi Arabia, Latin America, and Latin America.

Penspen is a member of Sidara, an international consulting company. Penspen offers a range of services including architecture and design, engineering, project management, digital strategy, sustainability consulting, and energy innovation.

The company has conducted the front-end engineering design for the Greece–Italy and Nabucco pipelines, feasibility studies for the Trans-Saharan gas pipeline and Azerbaijan–Georgia–Romania Interconnector, developed integrity policies and procedures for Pemex.

In 2007–2012, Penspen in cooperation with Manchester Jetline and Newcastle University researched the feasibility of using trained dogs to detect leaks in pipelines.
