= South East Europe Pipeline =

European natural gas pipeline

South East Europe Pipeline (proposal)

Location
- Country: Turkey, Bulgaria, Romania, Hungary, Austria
- Direction: east–west
- Start: Eastern Turkey
- To: Baumgarten an der March, Austria

General information
- Type: natural gas
- Partners: BP

Technical information
- Length: 800 km (500 mi)

The South East Europe Pipeline was a proposal for a natural gas pipeline from eastern Turkey to Baumgarten an der March in Austria. It was seen as an option for diversification of natural gas potential delivery routes for Europe from Azerbaijan. The pipeline would allow Azerbaijan to supply Europe with 10 billion cubic metres (350 billion cubic feet) of natural gas a year. The main source of the gas would be Shah Deniz gas field when its second stage comes online.

The pipeline was proposed by BP on 24 September 2011 as an alternative to the existing Southern Gas Corridor projects, including the Nabucco pipeline, Trans Adriatic Pipeline, and Interconnector Turkey–Greece–Italy. The pipeline was to use existing pipelines, but also needed 800–1,000 kilometres (500–620 mi) (by other sources 1,300 kilometres (810 mi)) of new pipeline to be laid in different countries. The total route is about 3,800 kilometres (2,400 mi).

On 28 June 2012 the BP-led Shah Deniz consortium announced it will choose between Nabucco West and Trans Adriatic Pipeline as an export option, and accordingly development of the South East Europe Pipeline project will cease.

== See also ==
- Nabucco pipeline
- Turkey–Greece pipeline
- Greece–Italy pipeline
- South Caucasus Pipeline
- Trans-Caspian Gas Pipeline
- New Europe Transmission System
- Nord Stream 1
- Russia–Ukraine gas dispute of 2005–2006
- Baku–Tbilisi–Ceyhan pipeline
- Mozdok – Makhachkala – Kazi Magomed pipeline
