= Șaroșul =

Șaroșul may refer to:

- Șaroș pe Târnave, a village in the town Dumbrăveni, Sibiu County, Romania, formerly Șaroșu Săsesc – meaning Saxon Șaroș
- Deleni, a village in the commune Băgaciu, Mureș County, Romania, formerly Șaroșul Unguresc – meaning Hungarian Șaroș
