= Zwerndorf =

Zwerndorf may refer to the following places in Austria:

- Zwerndorf (Sankt Pölten), part of Sankt Pölten
- Zwerndorf (Weiden an der March), part of Weiden an der March
