= Seep (disambiguation) =

A seep is a moist or wet place where water, usually groundwater, reaches the earth's surface from an underground aquifer.

Seep may also refer to:

== Other types of seeps ==
- Cold seep
- Petroleum seep
- Saline seep
- Tar seep

== Arts, entertainment, and media ==
- "Seep", an episode of 2009 horror mystery series Harper's Island

== Biology ==
- Seep frog (Occidozyga baluensis), a species of frog in Borneo
- Seep monkeyflower (Erythranthe guttata), a species of bee-pollinated perennial flower
- Seepweed (Suaeda), a genus of plants
- Seepwillow (Baccharis salicifolia), a blooming species of shrub in the United States, Mexico, and Guatemala

== People ==
- Aino Seep (1925–1982), Estonian opera singer and actress

== Other uses ==
- Ford GPA, an amphibious version of the World War II Ford GPW Jeep, also called Ford Seep (Sea Jeep)
- The SEEP Network, an American non-profit organization
- South East Europe Pipeline (SEEP), a pipeline proposal by BP
