= South Stream =

Proposed natural gas pipeline through south-eastern Europe

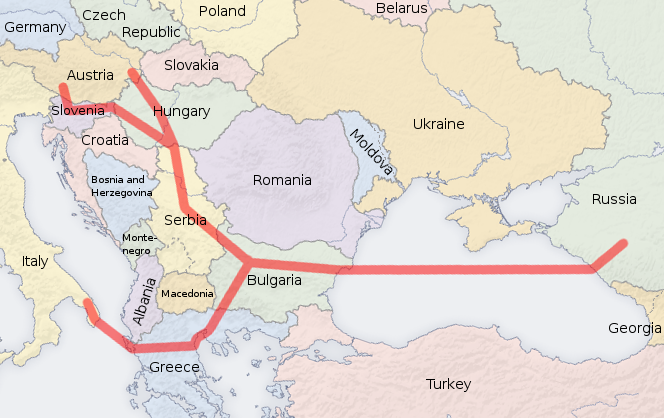
- Proposed route of South Stream

Location
- Country: Russian Federation; European Union; Republic of Serbia
- Direction: east–west
- Start: Russkaya compressor station near Anapa
- Passes through: Black Sea; Varna; Pleven; Zaječar; Paraćin; Gospođinci; Bački Breg; Hercegszántó; Tornyiszentmiklós
- To: Tarvisio, Italy; Baumgarten an der March, Austria

General information
- Type: Natural gas
- Partners: Gazprom; Eni; EDF; Wintershall; Naftna Industrija Srbije; Srbijagas
- Operator: South Stream Transport AG; National project companies

Technical information
- Length: 2,380 km (1,480 mi)
- Maximum discharge: 63 billion cubic metres per annum (2.2×10^{12} cu ft/a)
- No. of compressor stations: 10

South Stream (Russian: Южный поток, romanized: Yuzhnyy potok; Bulgarian: Южен поток, romanized: Južen potok; Serbian: Јужни ток; Slovene: Južni tok; Hungarian: Déli Áramlat; Italian: Flusso Meridionale) is a canceled pipeline project to transport natural gas of the Russian Federation through the Black Sea to Bulgaria and through Serbia, Hungary and Slovenia further to Austria. It was never finished.

The project was found in non-compliance with the European Union's Third Energy Package legislation, which stipulates the separation of companies' generation and sale operations from their transmission networks. The Russian Government cancelled the project on 1 December 2014, seven years after the project was started.

It was seen as rival to the Nabucco pipeline project, which was abandoned in favor of the Trans Adriatic Pipeline (TAP). Unlike South Stream, the TAP is fully compliant with EU legislation by way of having obtained EU Third Party Access Exemption.

Construction of the Russian onshore facilities for the South Stream pipeline started in December 2012. The project was cancelled by Russia in December 2014 following obstacles from the European Union, the 2014 Russian annexation of Crimea, and the resulting imposition of European sanctions on Russia. The project was replaced by other proposed projects; the 'Tesla pipeline' and Turkish Stream. The latter, renamed as TurkStream, was approved and later completed, sending gas supplies to Bulgaria on 1 January 2020.

== History ==
The South Stream pipeline project was announced on 23 June 2007, when the CEO Paolo Scaroni of the Italian energy company Eni and the Vice-Chairman Alexander Medvedev of the Russian Gazprom signed a memorandum of understanding in Rome for the construction of the pipeline. On 22 November 2007, Gazprom and Eni signed in Moscow an agreement on establishing a joint project company for the commissioning of the marketing and technical feasibility studies of the project.

The preliminary agreement between Russia and Bulgaria on Bulgaria's participation in the project was signed on 18 January 2008. It was agreed to set up an equally owned company to build and operate the Bulgarian section of the pipeline. The agreement was ratified by Bulgarian Parliament on 25 July 2008. The first agreement between Russia and Serbia was signed even before the announcement of the South Stream project. On 20 December 2006, Gazprom and the Serbian state-owned gas company Srbijagas agreed to conduct a study on building a gas pipeline running from Bulgaria to Serbia. On 25 January 2008, Russia and Serbia signed an agreement to route a northern line of South Stream through Serbia and to create a joint company to build the Serbian section of the pipeline and a gas storage facility near Banatski Dvor. On the same day, Russia and Hungary agreed to set up an equally owned joint company to build and operate the Hungarian section. On 29 April 2008, Russia and Greece signed an intergovernmental agreement on cooperation in construction and operation of the Greek section.

On 15 May 2009, in Sochi, in presence of the Prime Minister of Russia Vladimir Putin and the Prime Minister of Italy Silvio Berlusconi, the gas companies of Russia, Italy, Bulgaria, Serbia and Greece signed an agreement on construction of South Stream. On 6 August 2009, Russian Prime Minister Putin and the Prime Minister of Turkey Recep Tayyip Erdoğan, in presence the Italian premiere Berlusconi, signed a protocol routing the pipeline through the Turkish territorial waters. On 14 November 2009, followed the talks between Slovenian Prime Minister Borut Pahor and Russia's Putin, the agreement to run a part of the pipeline through Slovenia to Northern Italy was signed by Russian Energy Minister Sergei Shmatko and Slovenian Economy Minister Matej Lahovnik in Moscow. As per the earlier 2008 agreement between the two countries, on 17 November 2009, Russian Gazprom and Serbian Srbijagas created South Stream Serbia AG in Bern, Switzerland. The joint company was responsible for designing, financing, construction and operation of the Serbia section.

On 2 March 2010, Russian Energy Minister Sergei Shmatko and Croatian Economy, Labor and Entrepreneurship Minister Djuro Popijac in the presence of the Prime Minister of Russia Vladimir Putin and Prime Minister of Croatia Jadranka Kosor signed an agreement on linking Croatia with South Stream. On 19 June 2010, Gazprom, Eni, and Électricité de France published a joint press release confirming that EDF will join the project. On 21 March 2011, Slovenia and Russia signed an agreement regarding the establishment of a joint venture South Stream Slovenia.

The joint venture South Stream AG, equally owned by Gazprom and Eni, was registered on 18 January 2008 in Switzerland. However, on 16 September 2011, a shareholders' agreement was signed between Gazprom, Eni, Électricité de France and Wintershall to establish the new project company South Stream Transport AG for the Black Sea section of the pipeline. The company was incorporated on 3 October 2011 in Zug, Switzerland.

On 28 December 2011 Turkey issued its final agreement for allowing the pipeline to pass through its territorial waters. The final investment decision for the Serbian section was signed on 29 October 2012, for the Hungarian section on 2 November 2012, for the Slovenian section on 13 November 2012, and for the Bulgarian section on 15 November 2012. On 15 November 2012, shareholders of South Stream Transport AG signed the final investment decision on the offshore section. The ground-breaking ceremony marking start of construction of the Russian onshore facilities was held on 7 December 2012 at the Russkaya compressor station near Anapa.

On 25 July 2013, the Vice Premier Republic of Macedonia Zoran Stavreski signed the agreement on linking section through Republic of Macedonia with South Stream.

In March and April 2014, the contracts for laying the first and second lines of the offshore section were awarded to Saipem and Allseas. Contracts for the third and fourth line were to be signed in December 2014 and January 2015.

On 17 April 2014, amid Russia's annexation of Crimea, the European Parliament adopted a non-binding resolution opposing the South Stream gas pipeline and recommending a search for alternative sources of gas supplies for the European Union. On 29 April 2014 a memorandum on the implementation of the Austrian section was signed in Moscow. Commissioning of the Austrian section is scheduled by January 2018. In June 2014, Bulgaria temporarily stopped construction due to the European Commission's infringement procedure against Bulgaria for non-compliance with European rules on energy competition public procurements.

In April 2014, Russia filed a complaint at the World Trade Organization against the European Union's energy market laws that were enacted in 2009, claiming that they violate international rules. These laws ban suppliers from owning transit facilities such as gas pipelines, and would force Gazprom to allow third-party gas producers to use the South Stream pipeline.

On 1 December 2014, during a state visit to Turkey, president Putin announced that Russia was withdrawing from the project, blaming international sanctions and lack of construction permits in the territory of the European Union. Russia has started to build a pipeline through Turkey known as Turkish Stream. Renamed as TurkStream, the pipeline was later completed, sending gas supplies to Bulgaria on 1 January 2020.

Along with additional supplied to Turkey, Russian gas, according to Putin, "will be retargeted to other regions of the world, which will be achieved, among other things, through the promotion and accelerated implementation of projects involving liquefied natural gas." In 2015, the supply of Russian gas to Turkey will be raised by 3 billion cubic meters via the already operating Blue Stream pipeline. Later a new undersea pipeline to Turkey, with an annual capacity around 60 billion cubic metres (bcm) will be built. That will allow Turkey to resell Russian gas to Europe.

In 2018, Bulgaria's president Rumen Radev proposed that the construction of the South Stream pipeline be resumed.

== Route ==
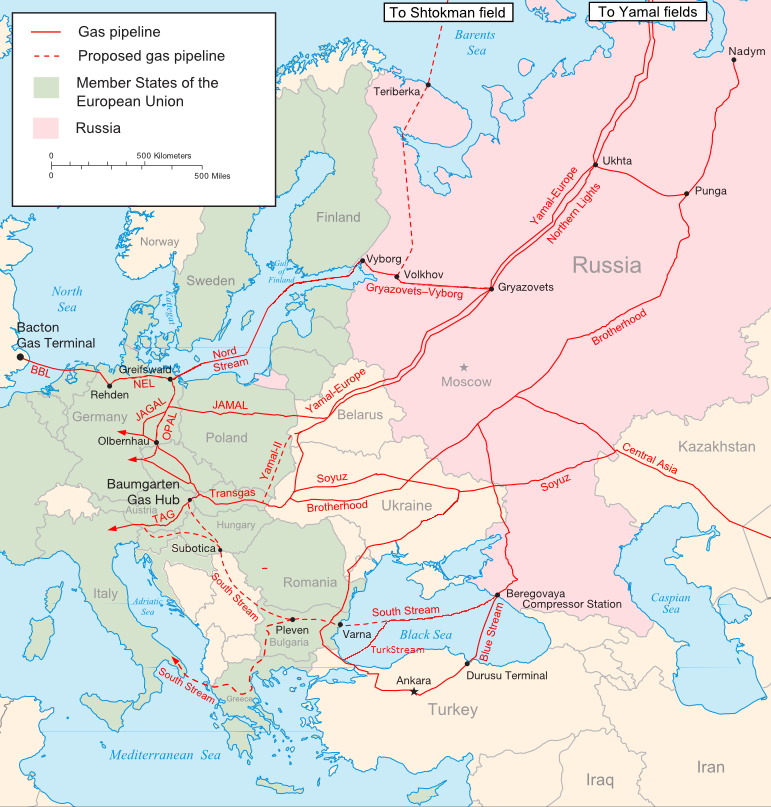
Major existing and planned natural gas pipelines supplying Russian gas to Europe in 2012.

The pipeline was to consist of the Russian onshore pipeline, the Black Sea section and pipelines in the South- East Europe. The Russian onshore section would have run from the Pochinki compressor station to the Russkaya compressor station near Anapa. The 931-kilometre (578 mi) long offshore section was to run from the Russkaya compressor station through the Black Sea to Galata near Varna, Bulgaria. Because of the Russia–Ukraine gas disputes, the pipeline was to be routed through Turkey's waters to avoid the exclusive economic zone of Ukraine. At the same time Russia's 2014 annexation of Crimea would have allowed more direct route through the Crimean waters.

The 1,455-kilometre (904 mi) long onshore section was to start from Varna and run to Pleven. From there, the original southwestern route was to continue through Greece and Ionian Sea to southern Italy. However, this route was abandoned. The newer northwestern route would have continued from Pleven to Serbia. In Serbia, then running through Zaječar and Paraćin to Čenta. From Čenta the main pipeline would have continued in direction of Gospođinci while branch-off line would run to Republika Srpska in Bosnia and Herzegovina. Srbijagas planned to construct along Sava river a 480-kilometre (300 mi) long branch pipeline with a capacity of 1.2 billion cubic metres (42 billion cubic feet) to Banja Luka and Sarajevo. It was also surmised that Montenegro could have connected to the pipeline.

Before reaching Gospođinci, the main line was to split. One route would continue through Serbia and Hungary to Baumgarten an der March in Austria. Another route would have continued through Gospođinci and Bački Breg also to Hungary with branch-off to Croatia. In Hungary it would have gone through Hercegszántó and Tornyiszentmiklós to Slovenia and further in direction of Tarvisio to supply northern Italy.

== Technical description ==
The feasibility study of the offshore section was conducted by Saipem, a subsidiary of Eni. Planning was done by INTECSEA, a subsidiary of WorleyParsons. Giprospetsgas, an affiliate of Gazprom, has been appointed as a general design contractor. The offshore pipeline is planned to carry 63 billion cubic metres (2.2 trillion cubic feet) of natural gas per year. It will have four parallel lines with capacity of 15.75 billion cubic metres (556 billion cubic feet) each. The offshore pipeline will use pipes with a diameter of 32 inches (810 mm), designed for 27.73 megapascals (4,022 psi) of working pressure and having the pipe wall thickness of 39 millimetres (1.5 in). The first line should be ready by the end of 2015, the second and third lines by the end of 2016, and the fourth line by the end of 2017. The offshore section is expected to cost €10 billion.

Pipeline sections in Bulgaria, Serbia, Hungary, and Slovenia would have capacity at least 10 billion cubic metres (350 billion cubic feet) per year. The onshore pipeline will have eight compressor stations and it is expected to cost €6 billion.

At least two gas storage facilities would be constructed of which one would be an underground storage facility in Hungary with capacity of minimum 1 billion cubic metres (35 billion cubic feet) and another one in Banatski Dvor, Serbia with capacity of 3.2 billion cubic metres (110 billion cubic feet). Hungarian oil and gas company MOL Group has offered its empty natural gas field at Pusztaföldvár as a 9 billion cubic metres (320 billion cubic feet) storage facility. British Melrose Resources is planning to convert the Galata offshore field in Bulgaria to a gas storage facility with initial capacity of 1.7 billion cubic metres (60 billion cubic feet) by 2009. There are also allegations that the South Stream pipeline will be connected to the Wingas-owned Haidach gas storage.

== Project companies ==
The pipeline would be built and operated by several project companies. For the construction and operation of the offshore section of South Stream originally two companies were established, both in Zug in Switzerland with the share capital of 100,000 CHF. South Stream AG, a joint venture between Gazprom and Eni was incorporated on 18 January 2008, and South Stream Transport AG, a joint company of Gazprom, Eni, Électricité de France, and Wintershall was incorporated on 3 October 2011. Head of South Stream Transport AG is Marcel Kramer, former chief executive officer of the gas transportation company Gasunie. Executive director is Oleg Aksyutin. Gazprom owns 50% of shares of South Stream Transport AG, Eni 20%, and Électricité de France and Wintershall 15% both. In November 2012, it was decided to incorporate South Stream Transport B.V., the current project company, in Amsterdam. Earlier Eni had registered in Amsterdam a company named South Stream BV, but in February 2012 it was renamed Eni JPDA 11-106 BV.

The Bulgarian section of the pipeline will be built and operated by a joint venture of Gazprom and Bulgargaz and the Serbian section by the joint venture of Gazprom and Srbijagas. The Hungarian section will be built and operated by the equally owned joint venture between Gazprom and the state-owned Hungarian Development Bank MFB, which will buy the elaborated feasibility study of Hungarian section from SEP Co., a joint venture of Gazprom and MOL. The Slovenia section would be built and operated by an equally owned joint venture of Gazprom and Geoplin Plinovodi. For construction of the Croatian section a 50-50 Russian-Croatian joint company would be established.

== Implications ==
=== Nabucco pipeline project ===
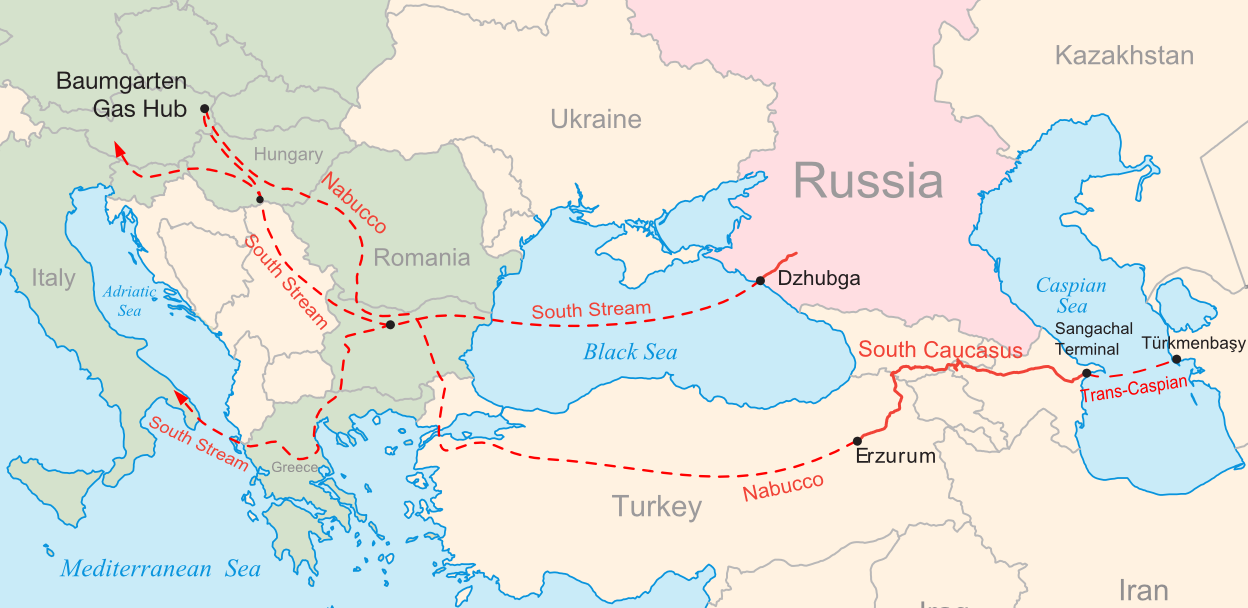
Map of the planned Nabucco and South Stream pipelines.

The South Stream project was seen as a rival to the Nabucco pipeline project. Some experts like Alan Riley from London City University were claiming that the South Stream pipeline is a political project to counter Nabucco and to expand Russian presence in the region.

CEO of Eni Paolo Scaroni proposed to merge Nabucco and South Stream projects to "reduce investments, operational costs and increase overall returns". This proposal was rejected by energy minister of Russia Sergei Shmatko saying that "South Stream is more competitive than Nabucco" and that "Nabucco and South Stream are far from being competitors". Also OMV, a partner in both projects, has said that there were no ongoing discussions about merging the projects.

=== Conflict with Ukraine ===
South Stream has been seen as diverting some gas transported through Ukraine, instead of providing a new source of gas for Europe. To avoid Ukraine's exclusive economic zone, the pipeline was re-routed through Turkish waters.

=== Offer to Romano Prodi ===
Before stepping down from the premiership, Italian Prime Minister Romano Prodi received an offer from Gazprom to become the Chairman of South Stream AG. This move was compared with the appointment of the former Chancellor of Germany Gerhard Schröder to lead Nord Stream AG, a consortium operating the Nord Stream 1 pipeline. Prodi has declined this offer. According to the Prodi's spokesman "Prodi was extremely flattered, but reiterated that he wants to take some time off to ponder after leaving Italian politics."

=== Stroytransgaz contract ===
In May 2014, it was disclosed that the contract for construction of the Bulgarian section was awarded to Stroytransgaz, a company controlled by Gennady Timchenko through his Volga Group. Earlier Timchenko was included in the sanctions list in the wake of the Russian annexation of Crimea due to his close ties with President Putin.

== See also ==
- TurkStream, also known as Turkish Stream – Natural gas pipeline from Russia to Turkey
- Balkan Stream
- Serbian Stream – Natural gas pipeline from Bulgaria to Hungary
- Blue Stream – Trans-Black Sea gas pipeline
- Nord Stream
- Trans Adriatic Pipeline – Greece to Italy gas pipeline
- Interconnector Turkey–Greece–Italy – European gas pipeline project
- Nabucco pipeline – Proposed natural gas pipeline from the Turkish-Bulgarian border to Austria
- Energy in Bulgaria
- Trans-Anatolian gas pipeline – Turkish natural gas pipeline
