= Reinhard Mitschek =

Austrian businessman

Reinhard Mitschek is a former managing director of the Nabucco Gas Pipeline International GmbH, a project company for the Nabucco pipeline project.
