= Bulgartransgaz =

Bulgartransgaz EAD is a natural gas transmission and storage system operator of Bulgaria. It is a subsidiary of Bulgarian Energy Holding EAD. Bulgartransgaz was created on 15 January 2007 in Sofia. In November 2009, the Bulgarian Government decided to list the company at the Bulgarian Stock Exchange - Sofia.

== See also ==
- Giurgiu–Ruse pipeline
