= Nord Stream =

Map of the Nord Stream 1 and 2 pipelines

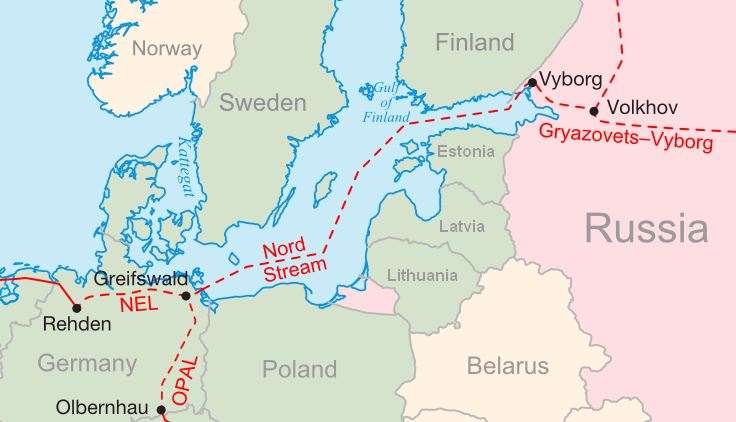
Map of the proposed Nord Stream and connecting pipelines

Nord Stream (German–English mixed expression for "North Stream"; Russian: Северный поток, Severny potok) is a set of offshore natural gas pipelines which run under the Baltic Sea from Russia to Germany to provide Western Europe with natural gas.

It comprises two separate projects, Nord Stream 1 and Nord Stream 2. Each of the pipelines comprises two pipes, NS1 A and B as well as NS2 A and B, making a total of 4 physical pipes. Both pipelines start in Russia and land in Lubmin, Germany. NordStream is owned by a consortium of 5 energy companies: Gazprom international projects North 1 LLC (Gazprom Group company), Wintershall Dea AG, PEG Infrastruktur AG (E.ON), N.V. Nederlandse Gasunie and ENGIE. It was the first pipeline that bypassed Ukraine and Poland to deliver Russian natural gas directly to West Europe.

- Nord Stream 1 (NS1) runs from Vyborg, in northwestern Russia near Finland, and entered service in 2011. It was operated by Nord Stream AG. From 31 August 2022, Gazprom halted delivery indefinitely, officially because of maintenance.
- Nord Stream 2 (NS2) runs from Ust-Luga in northwestern Russia near Estonia. The pipeline was built to increase gas exports to Europe, aiming to double capacity. The project was completed in 2021, but did not enter service, because Germany withheld opening permission on 22 February 2022, due to Russia recognizing the Ukrainian separatist regions of the Donetsk People's Republic and the Luhansk People's Republic as independent, in line with a previous joint warning made with US president Joe Biden on 7 February 2022 to end the project if Russia were to invade Ukraine.

The project Nord Stream 2 was opposed from the start by the United States, primarily because it would increase German dependence on Russian energy. The United States later imposed sanctions on companies that were involved in the project. The U.S. sanctions were criticized heavily by German politicians as "a serious interference in the internal affairs of Germany and Europe and their sovereignty".

In response to the Russian invasion of Ukraine, the EU Commission adopted on 18 July 2025 a sanctions package against Russia that bans the direct and indirect use of the Nord Stream pipelines.

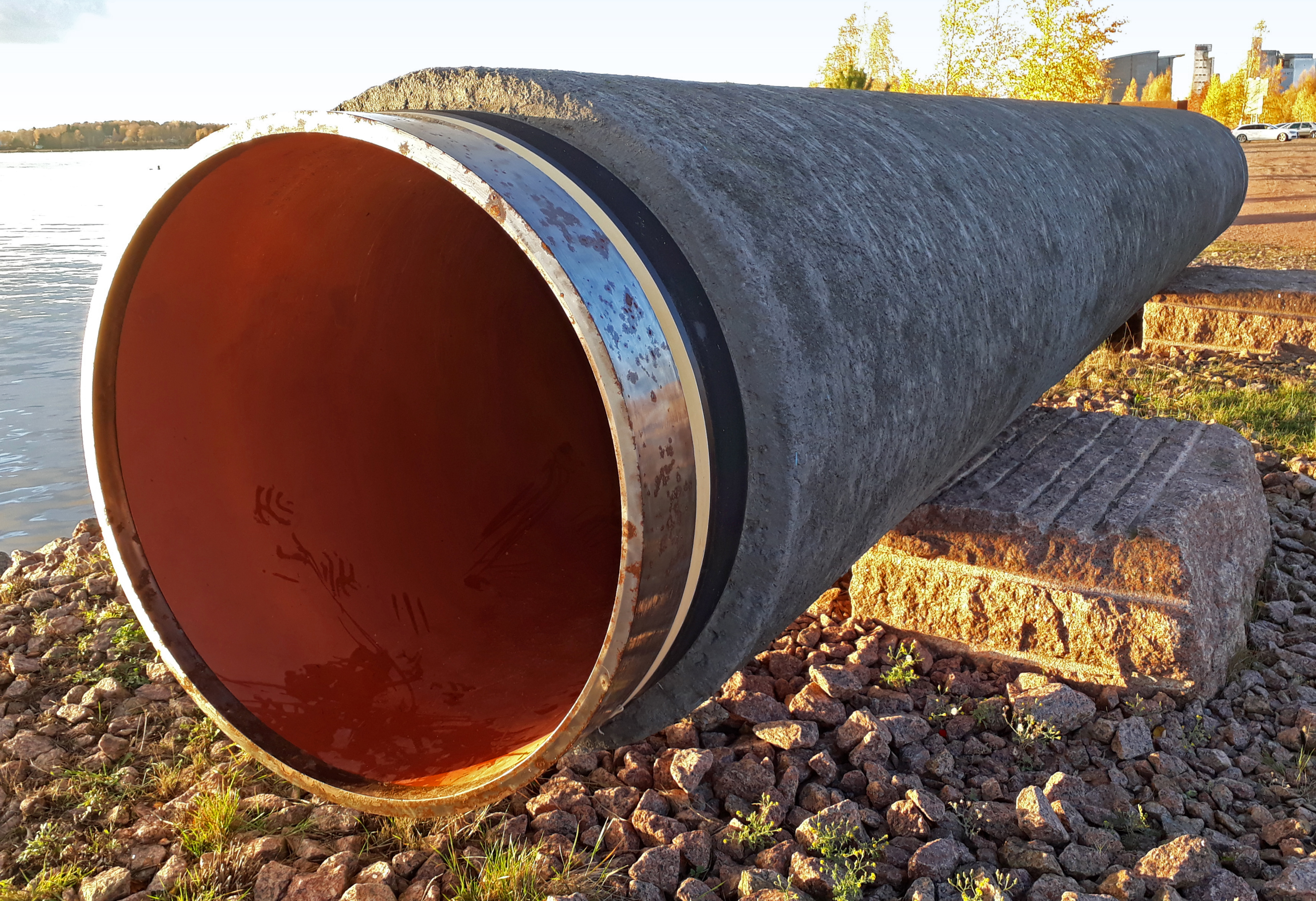
A piece of Nord Stream pipe on public display in Kotka, Finland

== 2022 sabotage ==
On 26 September 2022, news broke of four explosions at the Nord Stream 1 and 2 natural gas pipelines, rendering three of the four lines inoperable. Three separate investigations were started by Germany, Sweden and Denmark, the latter two were closed without publicly assigned responsibility for the damage in February 2024. In June 2024, German authorities issued an arrest warrant for a Ukrainian national suspected of the sabotage.

Although none of the four Nord Stream pipelines were in operation, they still contained pressurized natural gas, of which vast quantities were released into the Baltic Sea.

In 2024 and 2025, German investigations concluded that a team of divers directed by Ukrainian officials was responsible for the sabotage of the gas pipelines. The final investigation by Germany was hindered by the failure of Poland and Italy to extradite two suspects. The investigation into the sabotage was called off by Sweden and Denmark. Russia from the beginning pointed at the West to have sabotaged the project. Poland's prime minister Donald Tusk commented “the problem with Nord Stream 2 is not that it was blown up. The problem is that it was built”, while Hungary’s foreign minister, Péter Szijjártó, called Tusk’s stance “shocking” and accused Tusk of "defending terrorists".

== See also ==
- Balticconnector
- Nabucco pipeline
- South Stream
