= Azerbaijan–Georgia–Romania Interconnector =

The Azerbaijan–Georgia–Romania Interconnector (AGRI) is a proposed project to transport Azerbaijani natural gas to Romania and further to Central Europe. Natural gas would be transported by the pipeline from Sangachal Terminal in Azerbaijan to the Kulevi Terminal at the Black Sea coast of Georgia. In Kulevi, the liquefied natural gas export terminal (LNG plant) would be built. Liquefied natural gas will be transported by LNG tankers to the Constanța terminal in Romania. After regasification natural gas will be delivered through the existing gas grid to Romania and other European countries. Alternative to the transportation of liquefied natural gas is transportation of compressed natural gas.

Capacity of the interconnector is expected to be 7 billion cubic metres (250 billion cubic feet) of natural gas per year, of which 2 billion cubic metres (71 billion cubic feet) will be consumed in Romania. The project is expected to cost €4–6 billion.

On 13 April 2010, the Minister of Industry and Energy of Azerbaijan Natig Aliyev, Minister of Economy, Commerce and Business Environment of Romania Adriean Videanu and Georgian Energy Minister Alexander Khetaguri signed a memorandum on implementation of the project and establishment of the project company headquartered in Bucharest. The project is developed by AGRI LNG Co formed by Romgaz, State Oil Company of Azerbaijan Republic, Georgian Oil and Gas Corporation, and MVM. This also allows the possibility for Bulgaria to join the project.

The project is seen as a competitor to the Nabucco pipeline, White Stream, South Stream, Trans Adriatic Pipeline, and Interconnector Turkey–Greece–Italy projects.

On 14 February 2011, energy ministers of Azerbaijan, Georgia, Romania and Hungary announced the latter's joining in on the project, each of the four with equal shares. The company they had created to pursue the project, AGRI LNG Project Company, sought bidders for conducting the 2-year feasibility study of the project, and awarded a contract to Penspen Ltd to do so on 28 June 2012. Penspen's results were presented in December 2014 and approved by the project company in January 2015; they included a forecasted cost of US$5 Bn, a resulting capacity of 8 billion cubic meters per year, and would take 9 years to construct.

The project has been in limbo since mid-2015, with industry sources suggesting it is for want of investors, and security of the supply at the Azerbaijani end. Around that time, the government of Serbia was also invited to join the project.

On 8 March 2019, Georgian Oil and Gas, one of AGRI's shareholders, released an update on the project, saying "Currently, the shareholders of AGRI LNG Project Company are discussing the issues related to further development and implementation of AGRI project, supposedly after 2024-2026 years when realization of Azerbaijani Shah Deniz Phase 2 and other fields development projects are completed."

On 10 March 2021, Azerbaijan's energy minister stated that the project was frozen.

== See also ==
- Energy in Georgia (country)
