= Giurgiu–Ruse pipeline =

Location
- Country: Romania and Bulgaria
- Direction: north–south
- Start: Giurgiu, Romania
- Passes through: Romania and Bulgaria
- To: Ruse, Bulgaria

General information
- Type: natural gas
- Partners: Bulgartransgaz and Transgaz
- Operator: Bulgartransgaz and Transgaz
- Expected: 2012

Technical information
- Length: 26 km (16 mi)
- Maximum discharge: 1.5 billion cubic meters (51 Bcf) per year
- Diameter: 19.7 in (500 mm)

The Giurgiu–Ruse pipeline will be a natural gas pipeline from Giurgiu in Romania to Ruse in Bulgaria diversifying natural gas suppliers and delivery routes for the two countries and connects the two natural gas national grids. The Giurgiu–Ruse pipeline will be part of the larger New European Transmission System meant to unite Central and South Eastern Europe's natural gas transmission networks.

Preparations for the project started in 2010 and the intergovernmental agreement between Romania and Bulgaria was signed in November 2010. The project is developed by the consortium of two companies. The final investment decision was made at the end of 2010. The pipeline is expected to be operational by February 2012 and it will carry a minimum of 0.5 billion cubic meters and a maximum of 1.5 billion cubic meters of natural gas per year.

== History ==
The agreement between the Romanian gas company Transgaz and Bulgarian gas company Bulgartransgaz was signed in November 2010. The intergovernmental agreement to build a natural gas pipeline between the two countries was also signed in November 2010 in Ruse. The pipeline is supposed to be inaugurated in February 2012.

== Technical description ==
The length of the Romanian section will be 9.27 kilometres (5.76 mi). The length of Bulgarian section will be 16.73 kilometres (10 mi). The pipeline will also have a 4.14-kilometre (3 mi) section that will be built under the Danube river, and two natural gas measuring stations in both Giurgiu and Ruse. The diameter of pipeline will be 20 in (508 mm) and the capacity will be a maximum 1.5 billion cubic meter (bcm) of natural gas per annum. The total cost of the pipeline will be around €23.8 million (US$31 million) and the construction cost will be 42.4% for the Romanian section and 57.6% for the Bulgarian section. The two sections will meet near the Bulgarian/Romanian border under the Danube river.

== See also ==
- Arad–Szeged pipeline
