= Deleni gas field =

Gas field in Mureș County, Romania

Deleni
- Country: Romania
- Region: Mureș County
- Offshore/onshore: onshore
- Coordinates: 46.2703°N 24.3729°E
- Operator: Romgaz

Field history
- Discovery: 1912
- Start of development: 1912
- Start of production: 1915

Production
- Current production of gas: 5×10^{6} m^{3}/d 178×10^{6} cu ft/d 1.78×10^{9} m^{3}/a (63×10^{9} cu ft/a)
- Estimated gas in place: 85×10^{9} m^{3} 3×10^{12} cu ft

The Deleni gas field is a natural gas field located in Băgaciu, Mureș County. It was discovered in 1912 and developed by and Romgaz. It began production in 1915 and produces natural gas and condensates. The total proven reserves of the Deleni gas field are around 3 trillion cubic feet (85 km^{3}), and production is slated to be around 178 million cubic feet per day (5,000,000 m^{3}/d) in 2010.

Deleni is the richest methane deposit in Romania, containing many gas horizons down to a depth of 700 m (2,300 ft). It provides fuel for the municipalities of Târnăveni and Târgu Mureș, as well as the capital city, Bucharest. Deleni is the largest gas field in Romania.
