= Ahiboz, Gölbaşı =

Ahiboz
- Neighbourhood
- Location in Turkey Ahiboz (Turkey Central Anatolia)
- Coordinates: 39°36′N 32°51′E
- Country: Turkey
- Province: Ankara
- District: Gölbaşı
- Population (2022): 220
- Time zone: UTC+3 (TRT)

Ahiboz is a neighborhood in the municipality and district of Gölbaşı, Ankara Province, Turkey. Its population is 220 (2022).
