= Port of Bechet =

Location
- Country: Romania
- Location: Dolj County

Details
- Owned by: Administratia Porturilor Dunarii Fluviale
- Type of harbour: Natural/Artificial
- Size: 76,286 square metres (7.6286 ha)
- No. of berths: 1
- General manager: Ofiteru Danut

Statistics
- Annual cargo tonnage: 50,000 tonnes (2008)
- Website; Official site

The Port of Bechet is one of the largest Romanian river ports, located in the city of Bechet on the Danube River. At Portul Bechet, there is a 126.5 metres tall unused electricity pylon, which was built in 1967 for the former 220 kV-line from Ișalnița to Kozlodui .
