= Transgaz =

- Type: Public
- Traded as: BVB: TGN
- Industry: Gas
- Founded: 2000
- Headquarters: Mediaș, Romania
- Key people: Ion Sterian, CEO
- Revenue: ▲US$1.1 billion (2025)
- Operating income: ▲US$233.4 million (2025)
- Net income: ▲US$197.4 million (2025)
- Total assets: ▲US$2.5 billion (2025)
- Total equity: ▲US$1.0 billion (2025)
- Number of employees: 4,148 (2025)
- Parent: Romanian Government (58.5%)

Transgaz is a state-owned company, which is the technical operator of the national natural gas transmission system in Romania. The company handled in 2017 a quantity of 12.87 billion m³ of natural gas.

The company has a total transport capacity of 30 billion m³ of natural gas and a pipe network of 13,000 km.

Transgaz is a member of the European Network of Transmission System Operators for Gas.

== Connections to other countries ==
- Hungary through the Arad–Szeged pipeline
- Ukraine through Cernauti-Siret natural gas pipeline
- Bulgaria through Negru Voda natural gas pipeline and Giurgiu–Ruse pipeline
- Moldova through the Iași–Chișinău pipeline that was inaugurated on 27 August 2014 (then going from Iași to Ungheni).

== Shareholders ==
Although state-owned, Transgaz was partially privatised in 2007 and 2013 respectively.

As of 31 December 2025, Transgaz's shareholder structure was:

- Romanian Government (represented by the General Secretariat): 58.5096%
- Other shareholders: 41.4904%

== Listing on the Bucharest Stock exchange ==
On 26 November 2007, Transgaz issued an IPO on the BSE aiming to earn around US$84 million for developing on the local market and abroad but at the end of the IPO offer the company earned a total sum of US$2.52 billion making it the largest IPO on the BSE surpassing Transelectrica which earned US$308 million in 2006.

On 15 April 2013, there was a SPO on the BSE for 15% of the company that raised US$95 million.

== See also ==
- Arad–Szeged pipeline
- Nabucco pipeline
- European Network of Transmission System Operators for Gas
- Gazprom Transgaz Belarus
