= Arad–Szeged pipeline =

Romania-Hungarian natural gas pipeline

Location
- Country: Romania and Hungary
- Direction: east–west
- Start: Arad, Romania
- Passes through: Romania and Hungary
- To: Szeged, Hungary

General information
- Type: natural gas
- Partners: MOL and Transgaz
- Operator: MOL and Transgaz
- Expected: 2010

Technical information
- Length: 109 km (68 mi)
- Maximum discharge: 4.4 billion cubic meters (0.15 Tcf) per year
- Diameter: 27.5 in (698 mm)

The Arad–Szeged pipeline is a natural gas pipeline from Arad in Romania to Szeged in Hungary diversifying natural gas suppliers and delivery routes for the two countries and connects the two natural gas national grids. The pipeline attempts to lessen the two country's dependence on Russian energy. The Arad–Szeged pipeline is part of the larger New European Transmission System meant to unite Central and South Eastern Europe's natural gas transmission networks.

Preparations for the project started in 2008 and the intergovernmental agreement between Romania and Hungary was signed on 1 July 2008. The project is developed by the consortium of two companies. The final investment decision was made at the end of 2008. The pipeline is expected to be operational by September 2010 and it will carry 4.4 billion cubic meters of natural gas per year.

== History ==
The agreement between Romanian gas company Transgaz and Hungarian oil and gas company MOL was signed on 1 July 2008. The intergovernmental agreement to build a natural gas pipeline between countries was signed in May 2010 in Arad. The pipeline was supposed to be inaugurated on 29 July 2010 but was postponed until September due to construction issues on the Hungarian side. The pipeline is supposed to be inaugurated by the European Commissioner for Energy Günther Oettinger.

== Technical description ==
The length of the Romanian section is 62 kilometres (39 mi). The length of Hungarian section is 47 kilometres (29 mi). The diameter of pipeline is 27.5 inches (700 mm) and the capacity is 4.4 billion cubic meter (bcm) of natural gas per annum. The total cost of the pipeline was around €68 million (US$85 million) and the construction cost was 48% for the Romanian section and 52% for the Hungarian section. The two sections meet near the Hungarian/Romanian border at Csanádpalota/Nădlac.

== See also ==
- Giurgiu–Ruse pipeline
