= Weiden an der March =

- Municipality
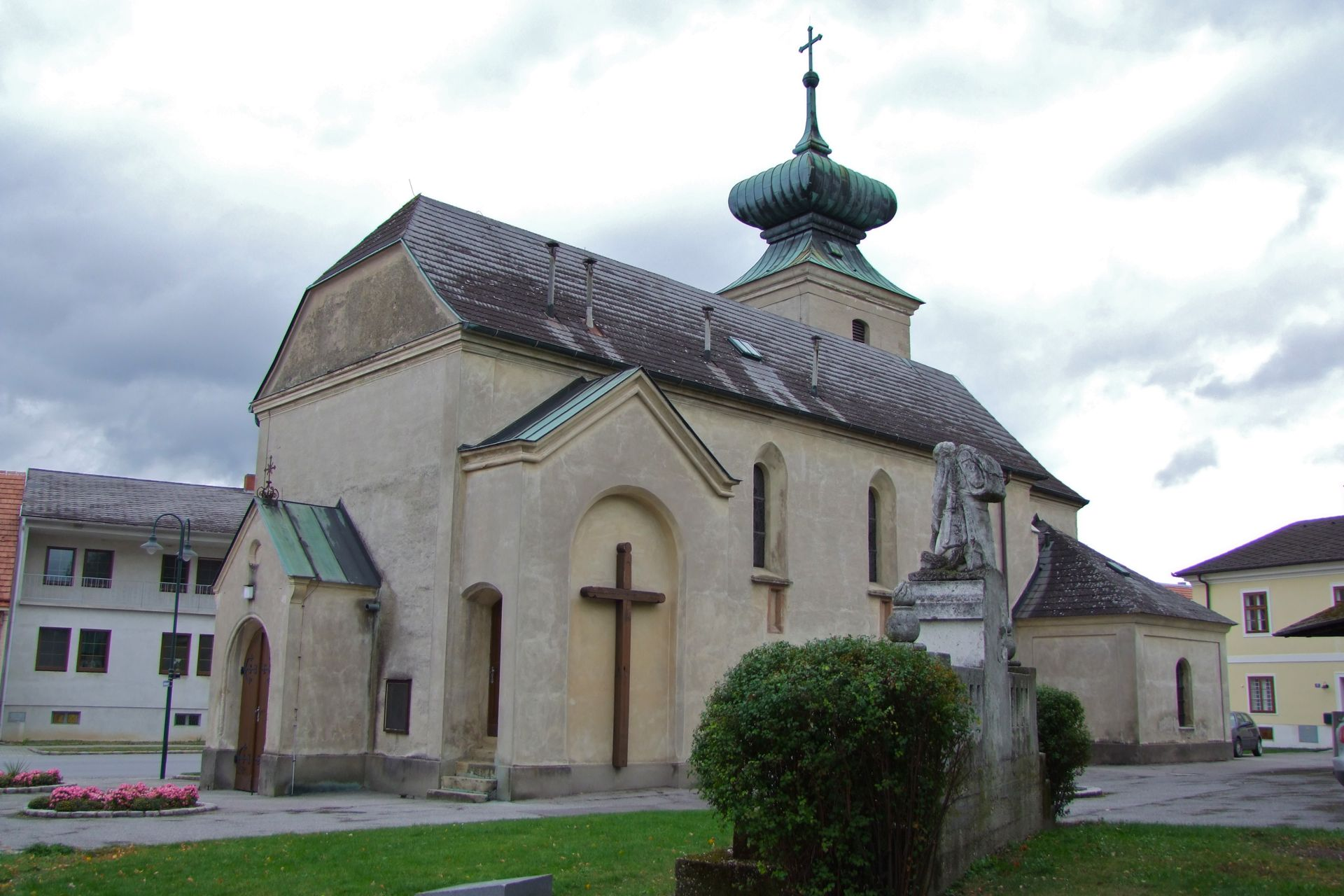
- Oberweiden parish church

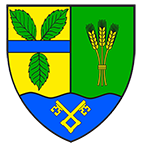
- Coat of arms

- Location within Austria
- Coordinates: 48°18′N 16°49′E
- Country: Austria
- State: Lower Austria
- District: Gänserndorf

Government
  - Mayor: Josef Dienst

Area
  - Total: 55.78 km^{2} (21.54 sq mi)
- Elevation: 162 m (531 ft)

Population (2018-01-01)
  - Total: 991
  - Density: 17.8/km^{2} (46.0/sq mi)
- Time zone: UTC+1 (CET)
  - Summer (DST): UTC+2 (CEST)
- Postal code: 2295
- Area code: 02284
- Website: www.weiden-march.at

Weiden an der March is a municipality in the district of Gänserndorf in Lower Austria, Austria.

== Geography ==
Weiden an der March lies in the Weinviertel in Lower Austria. It lies near the river Morava (German: March), which forms the border with Slovakia. 19.63% of the municipality is forested.

On 1 January 1975 the former municipalities of Baumgarten an der March, Oberweiden and Zwerndorf were merged to form Weiden an der March.

== Population ==
Historical population
Year	Pop.	±%
1971	921	—
1981	854	−7.3%
1991	822	−3.7%
2001	904	+10.0%
2011	985	+9.0%

== Economy ==
There are 26 companies in Weiden, and 403 persons are employed. The employment rate in 2001 was 45.79%.
