= Bulgarian Energy Holding =

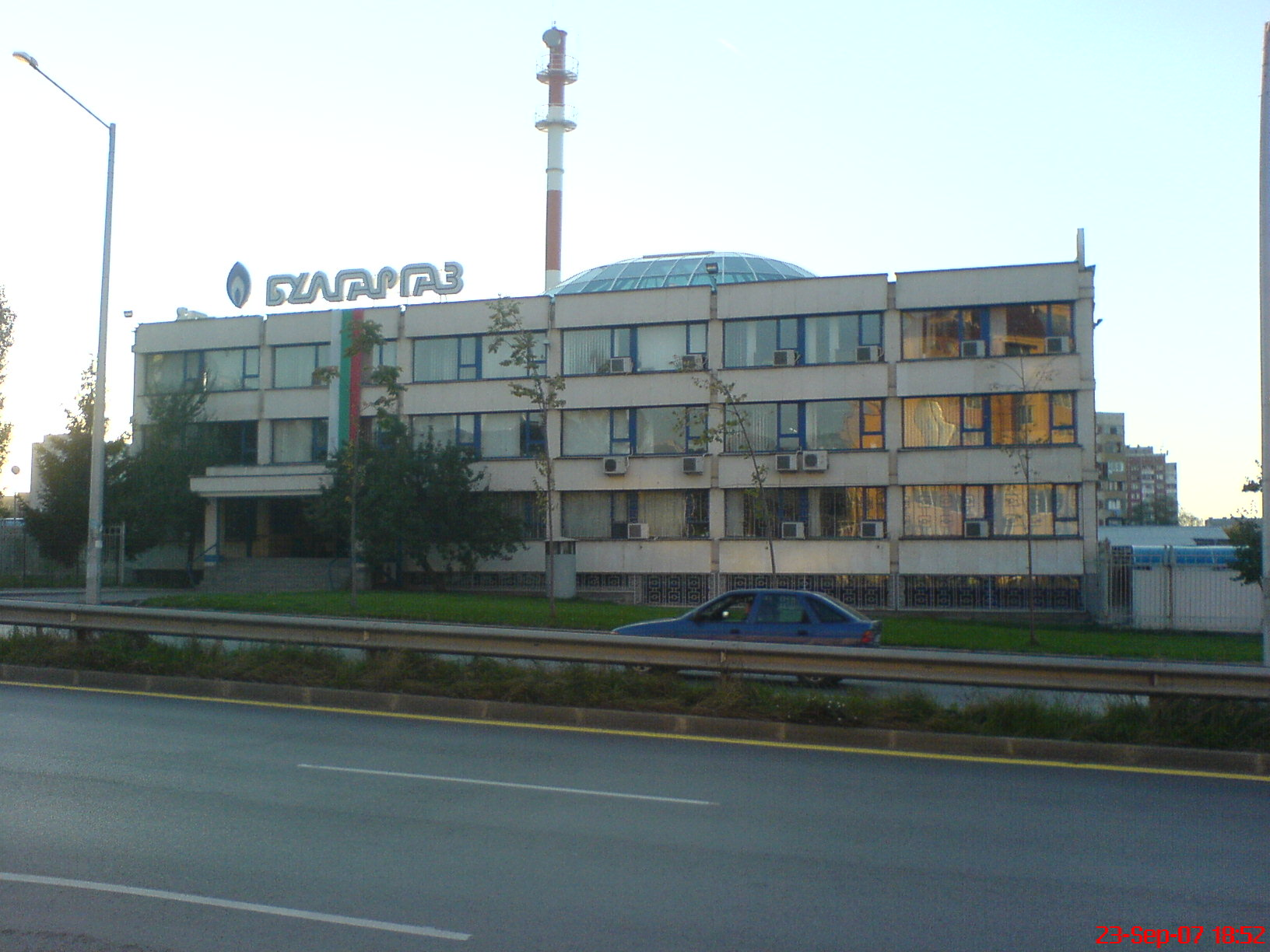

Bulgarian Energy Holding EAD (BEH EAD) is a state-owned energy holding company in Bulgaria. It was incorporated on 18 September 2008 after renaming Bulgargaz Holding EAD. In November 2009, the Bulgarian Government decided to list the company on the Bulgarian Stock Exchange – Sofia.

It is the owner of the Maritsa Iztok-2 power station. This power station was ranked as the industrial facility that is causing the highest damage costs to health and the environment in Bulgaria and the entire European Union in November 2014 by the European Environment Agency.

== History ==
In January 2026, it was announced that Bulgarian Energy Holding EAD had agreed to acquire a 10 per cent participating interest in the Han Asparuh offshore exploration block in the Black Sea from OMV Petrom and NewMed Energy. The transaction, undertaken following a directive from the Bulgarian parliament, remained subject to government approval and amendments to the joint operating agreement governing the licence.

== Subsidiaries ==
BEH EAD has the following subsidiaries:

- Mini Maritsa Iztok EAD
- Maritsa East 2 TPP EAD
- Kozloduy NPP EAD
- NEK EAD
- Electricity System Operator EAD
- Bulgargaz EAD
- Bulgartransgaz EAD
- Bulgartel EAD
