= Pescăruș oil field =

Petroleum reservoir in the Black Sea

Pescăruș
- Country: Romania
- Region: Black Sea
- Offshore/onshore: offshore
- Operator: Petrom

Field history
- Discovery: 1999
- Start of development: 1999
- Start of production: 2001

Production
- Current production of oil: 5,000 barrels per day (~2.5×10^{5} t/a)
- Current production of gas: 500×10^{3} m^{3}/d 17.9×10^{6} cu ft/d 0.178×10^{9} m^{3}/a (6.3×10^{9} cu ft/a)
- Estimated oil in place: 14 million tonnes (~ 20×10^{6} m^{3} or 100 million bbl)
- Estimated gas in place: 3.2×10^{9} m^{3} 114×10^{9} cu ft

The Pescăruș oil field is an oil field located on the continental shelf of the Black Sea. It was discovered in 1999 and developed by Petrom. It began production in 2001 and produces oil. The total proven reserves of the Pescăruș oil field are around 100 million barrels (14 million tonnes), and production is centered on 5,000 barrels per day (790 m^{3}/d). The field also produces around 17.9 million cubic feet/day (0.5×10^{5}m³) of gas and has reserves of 114 billion cubic feet (3.2 billion m³).
