= Băgaciu =

Băgaciu Szászbogács
- Commune
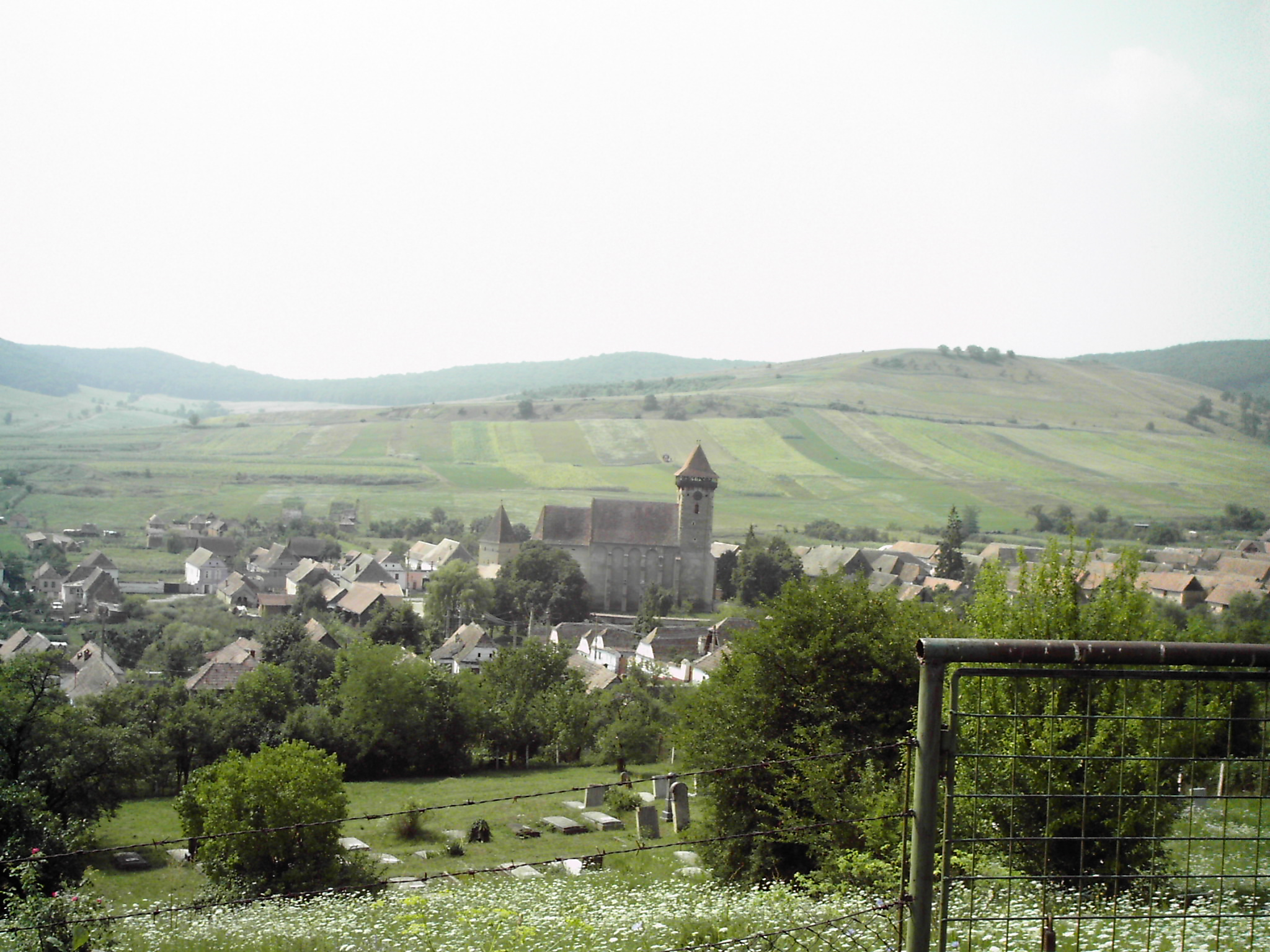
- Panoramic view of the commune with the Transylvanian Saxon Evangelical Lutheran fortified church in the background

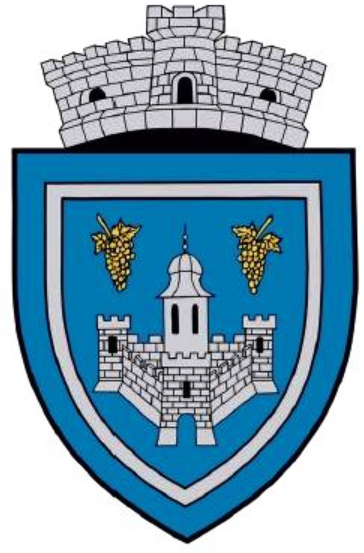
- Coat of arms

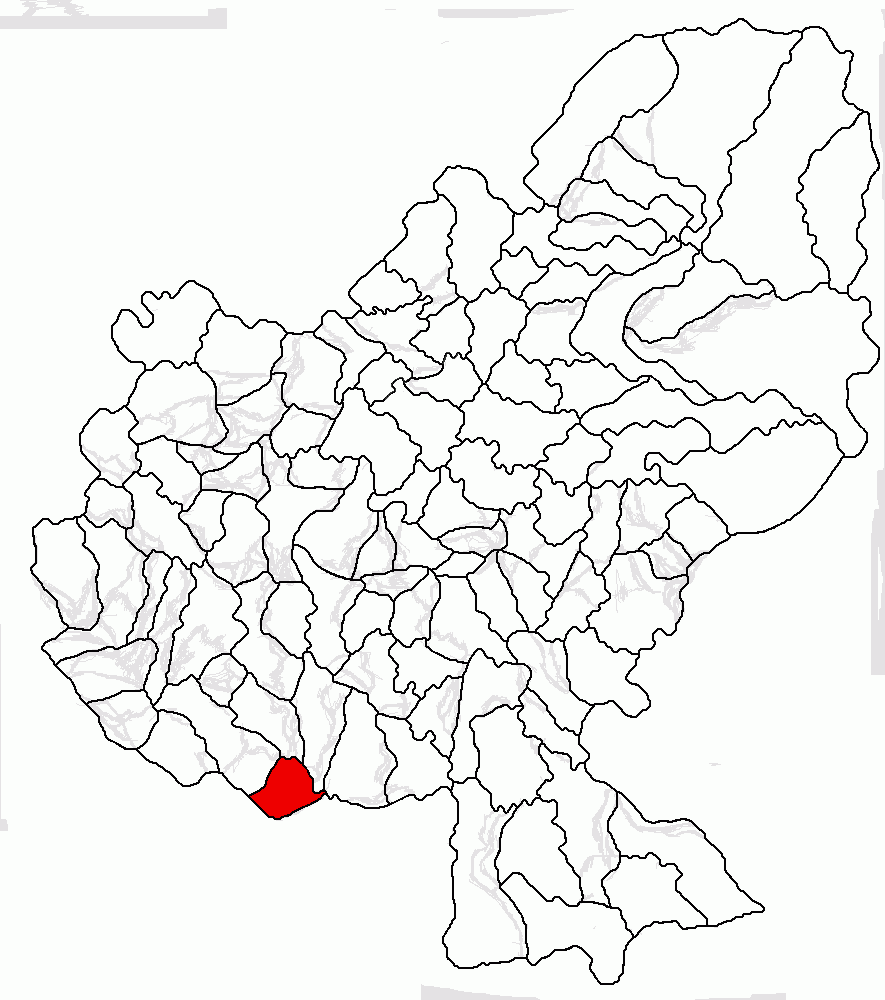
- Location in Mureș County

- Location in Romania
- Coordinates: 46.27°N 24.37°E
- Country: Romania
- County: Mureș

Government
  - Mayor (2020–2024): Ioan Aldea (PSD)
- Area: 36.84 km^{2} (14.22 sq mi)
- Elevation: 559 m (1,834 ft)
- Population (2021-12-01): 2,542
  - Density: 69.00/km^{2} (178.7/sq mi)
- Time zone: UTC+02:00 (EET)
  - Summer (DST): UTC+03:00 (EEST)
- Postal code: 547090
- Area code: (+40) 02 65
- Vehicle reg.: MS
- Website: www.primaria-bagaciu.ro

Băgaciu (Hungarian: Szászbogács, Hungarian pronunciation: [ˈsaːsboɡaːtʃ], German: Bogeschdorf or Bogendorf, Transylvanian Saxon: Bogeschtref) is a commune in Mureș County, Transylvania, Romania. It is composed of two villages, namely Băgaciu and Deleni (Hungarian: Magyarsáros).

== Geography ==
The commune is situated on the Transylvanian Plateau. It is located in the southern part of Mureș County, 13 km (8.1 mi) from the city of Târnăveni and 39 km (24 mi) from the county seat, Târgu Mureș, on the border with Sibiu County. Băgaciu is crossed by country roads DJ142A and DJ142D.

== Demographics ==
Historical population
Year	Pop.	±%
2002	2,589	—
2011	2,474	−4.4%
2021	2,542	+2.7%
Source: Census data

According to the 2011 census, Băgaciu had a population of 2,474, of which 34.51% were Romanians, 31.16% were Roma, and 29.7% were Hungarians. At to the 2021 census, it had a population of 2,542, of which 47.92% were Roma, 25.45% Romanians, and 21.87% Hungarians.

== Economy ==
The Deleni gas field lies on the territory of the commune.

== Gallery ==
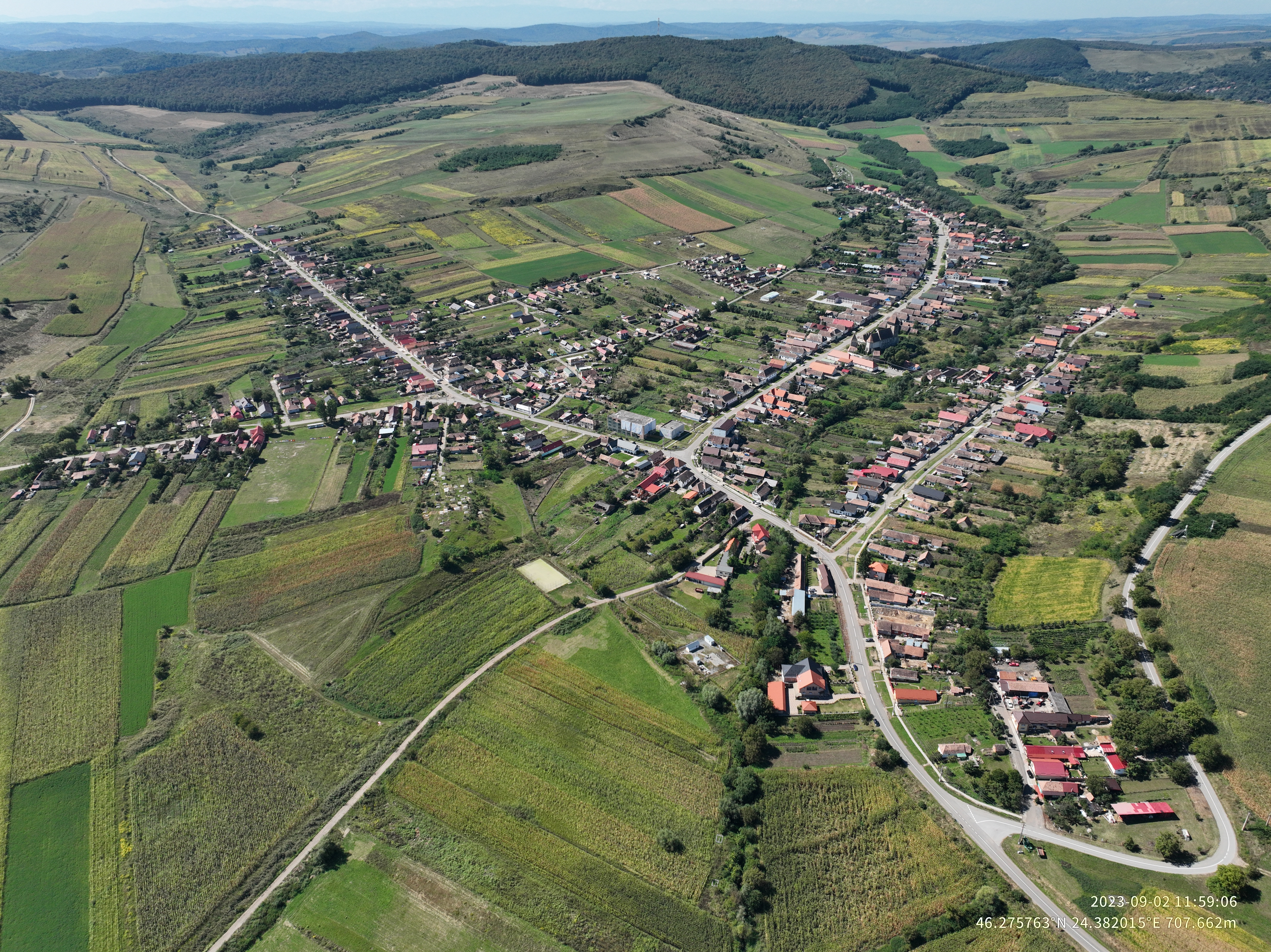
Aerial view

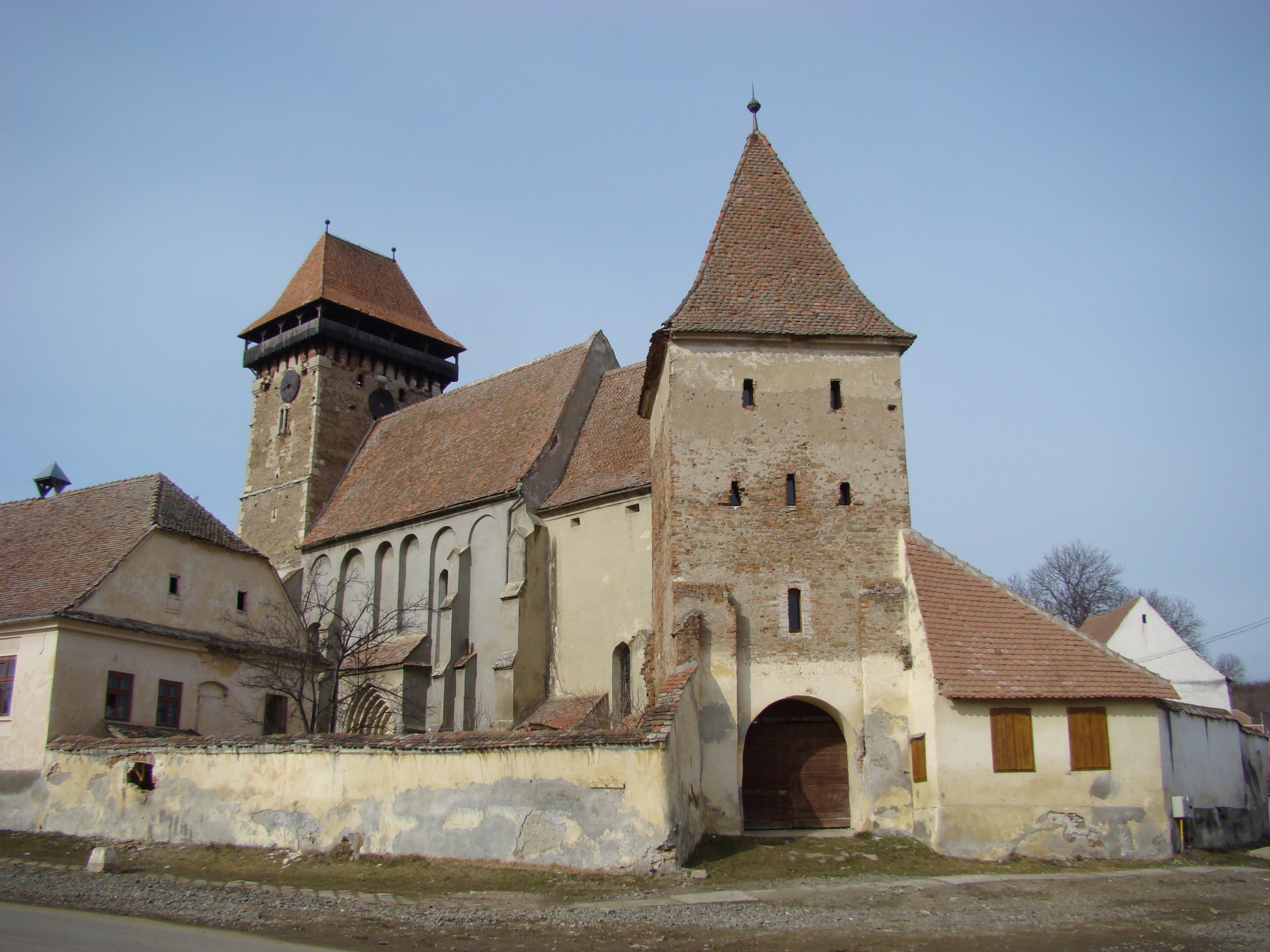
Evangelical Lutheran fortified church of the Transylvanian Saxons in Băgaciu

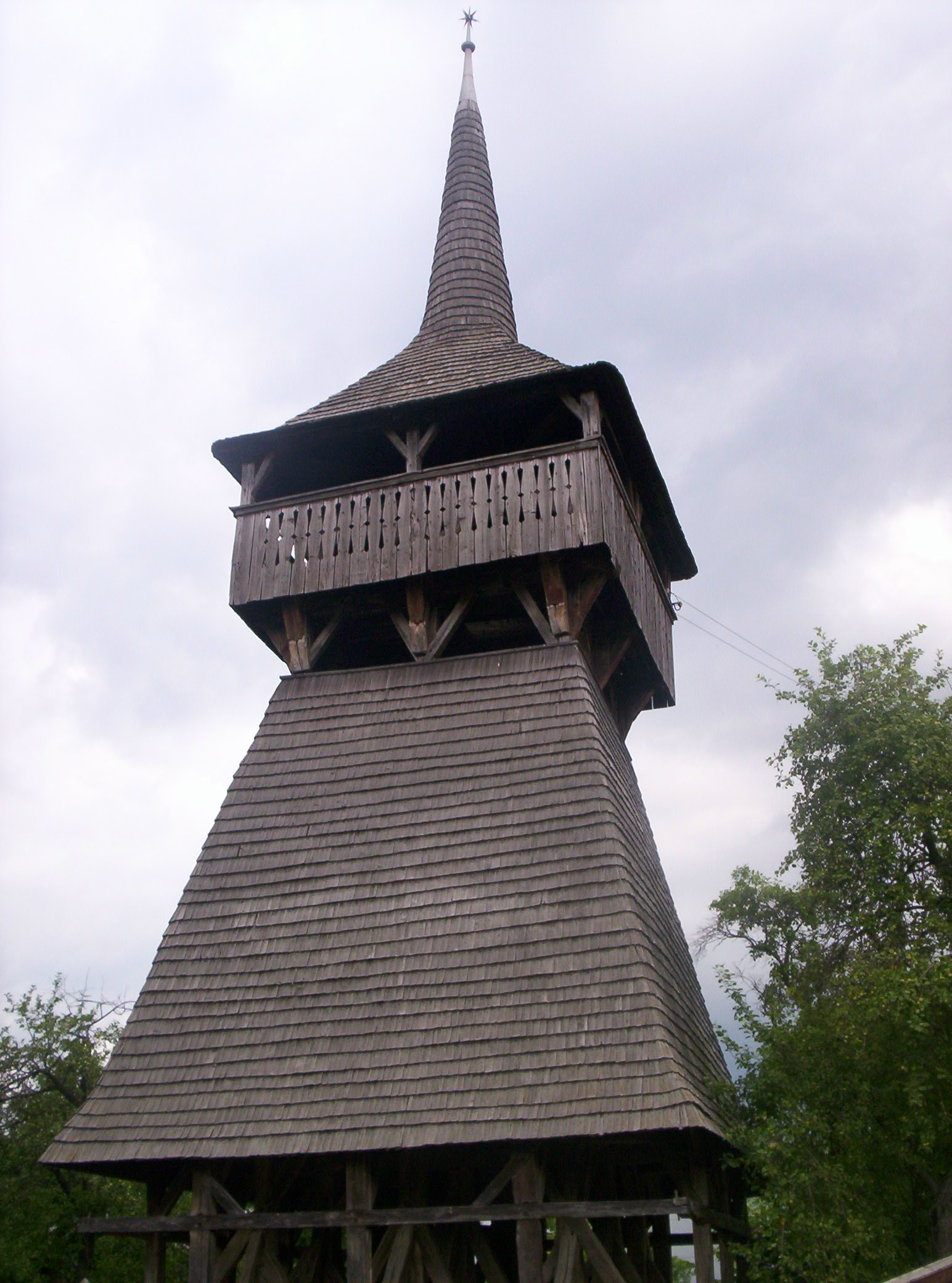
Wooden church in Deleni

== See also ==
- List of Hungarian exonyms (Mureș County)
