= Bulgargaz =

- Company type: State owned
- Industry: Oil and gas industry
- Founded: 1963
- Headquarters: Sofia, Bulgaria
- Revenue: ▲BGN 1.637 billion (2011)
- Net income: ▼BGN 73.2 million (2011)
- Number of employees: 46 (2011)
- Website: www.bulgargaz.bg/en

Bulgargaz is the largest Bulgarian natural gas distribution company. It is a subsidiary of Bulgarian Energy Holding EAD, a holding company established on 18 September 2008. As of November 2009 the company is listed on the Bulgarian Stock Exchange - Sofia.
