= Turkey–Greece gas pipeline =

European gas pipeline project

Turkey–Greece pipeline

Location
- Country: Turkey; Greece
- Start: Karacabey, Turkey
- To: Komotini, Greece

General information
- Type: natural gas
- Construction started: 2005
- Commissioned: 2007

Technical information
- Length: 296 km (184 mi)
- Maximum discharge: 11 billion cubic metres per annum (390×10^{9} cu ft/a)
- Diameter: 36 in (914 mm)

Gas flows from Turkey to Greece through a pipeline which is almost 300 km long. It is an incomplete transportation project that was proposed in the framework of the Southern Gas Corridor. It was proposed for the transportation of natural gas from Azerbaijan's Shah Deniz gas field Phase II to markets in Europe via Greece and Italy. The Turkey–Greece pipeline was completed in 2007 while the Greece–Italy pipeline was not built, due to the competing Trans Adriatic Pipeline.

The Turkey–Greece pipeline is a 296 kilometres (184 mi) natural gas pipeline, which connects Turkish and Greek gas grids. The pipeline begins in Karacabey in Turkey and runs to Komotini in Greece.

== History ==
The agreement between Turkish gas company BOTAŞ and Greek gas company DEPA was signed on 28 March 2002. The intergovernmental agreement to build a natural gas pipeline between the two countries was signed on 23 December 2003 in Ankara. The foundation of the pipeline was laid on 3 July 2005 by the prime ministers Kostas Karamanlis and Recep Tayyip Erdoğan. It was completed in September 2007. The pipeline was officially inaugurated on 18 November 2007.

== Technical description ==
The length of the Turkish section is 210 kilometres (130 mi), of which 17 kilometres (11 mi) are under the Sea of Marmara. The length of the Greek section is 86 kilometres (53 mi). The diameter of the pipeline is 36 inches (910 mm) and the capacity is 7 billion cubic metres (250 billion cubic feet) of natural gas per year.

== See also ==
- Nabucco pipeline
- South Caucasus Pipeline
- South Stream
