= Baumgarten an der March =

Coordinates: 48°18′34″N 16°52′15″E

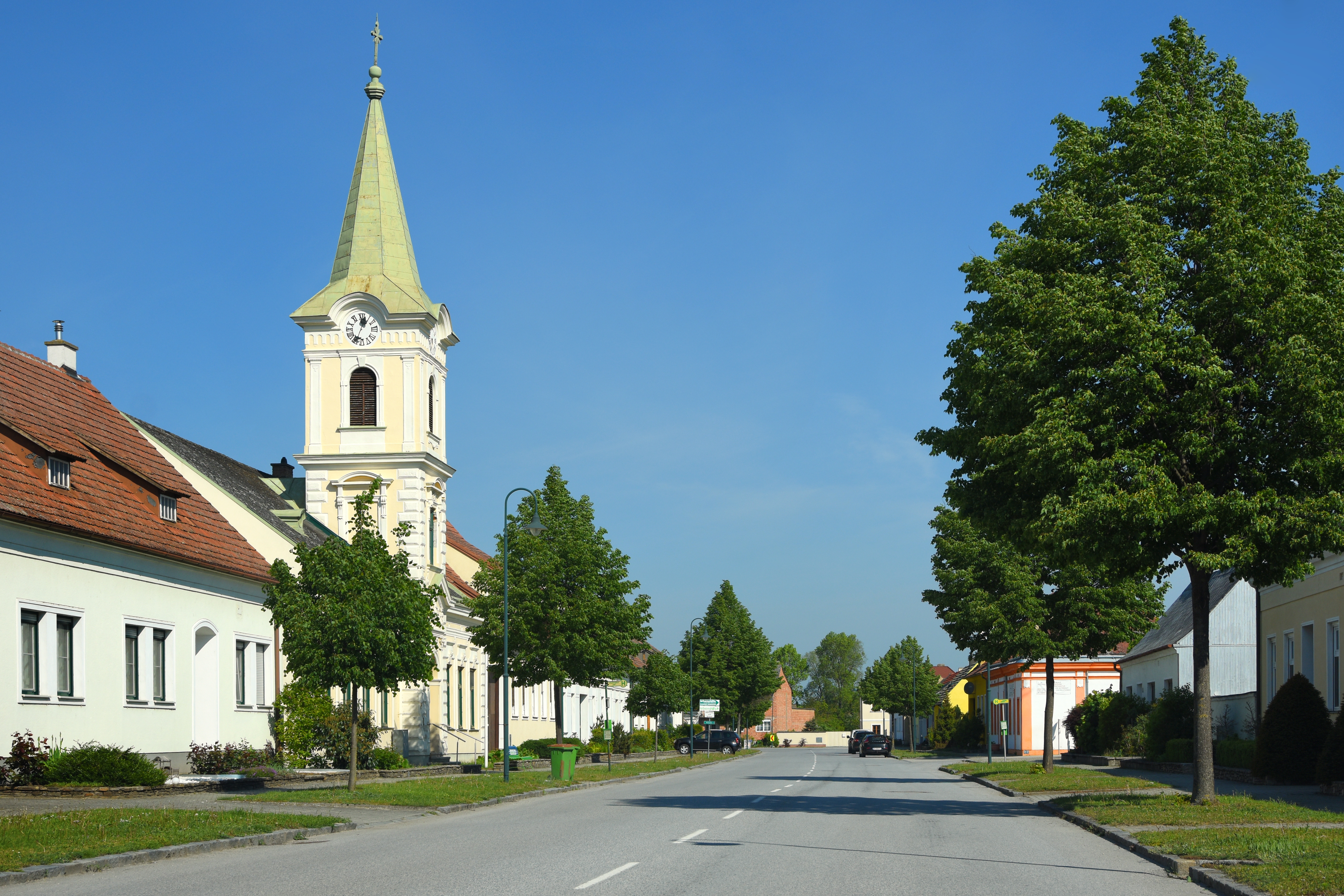
Baumgarten an der March in May 2019

Baumgarten an der March (Croatian: Pangort na Moravi) is a small subdivision of the municipality of Weiden an der March in Lower Austria, Austria. It has only 192 inhabitants. It is on the border of Slovakia.

== Significance for the energy sector ==
Major existing and planned natural gas pipelines supplying Russian gas to Europe in 2009

Baumgarten has an important role in the European energy sector. The Baumgarten gas distribution centre developed from the central production facility of the spent Zwerndorf gas field, and came online in 1959. The first gas shipment from Russia was received in 1968. Over the past few decades, Baumgarten has become one of Europe's most important gas distribution stations. Every year around 40 billion cubic metres of gas are distributed from the Baumgarten gas station to Eastern Austria and to Western, Southern and South-Eastern Europe.

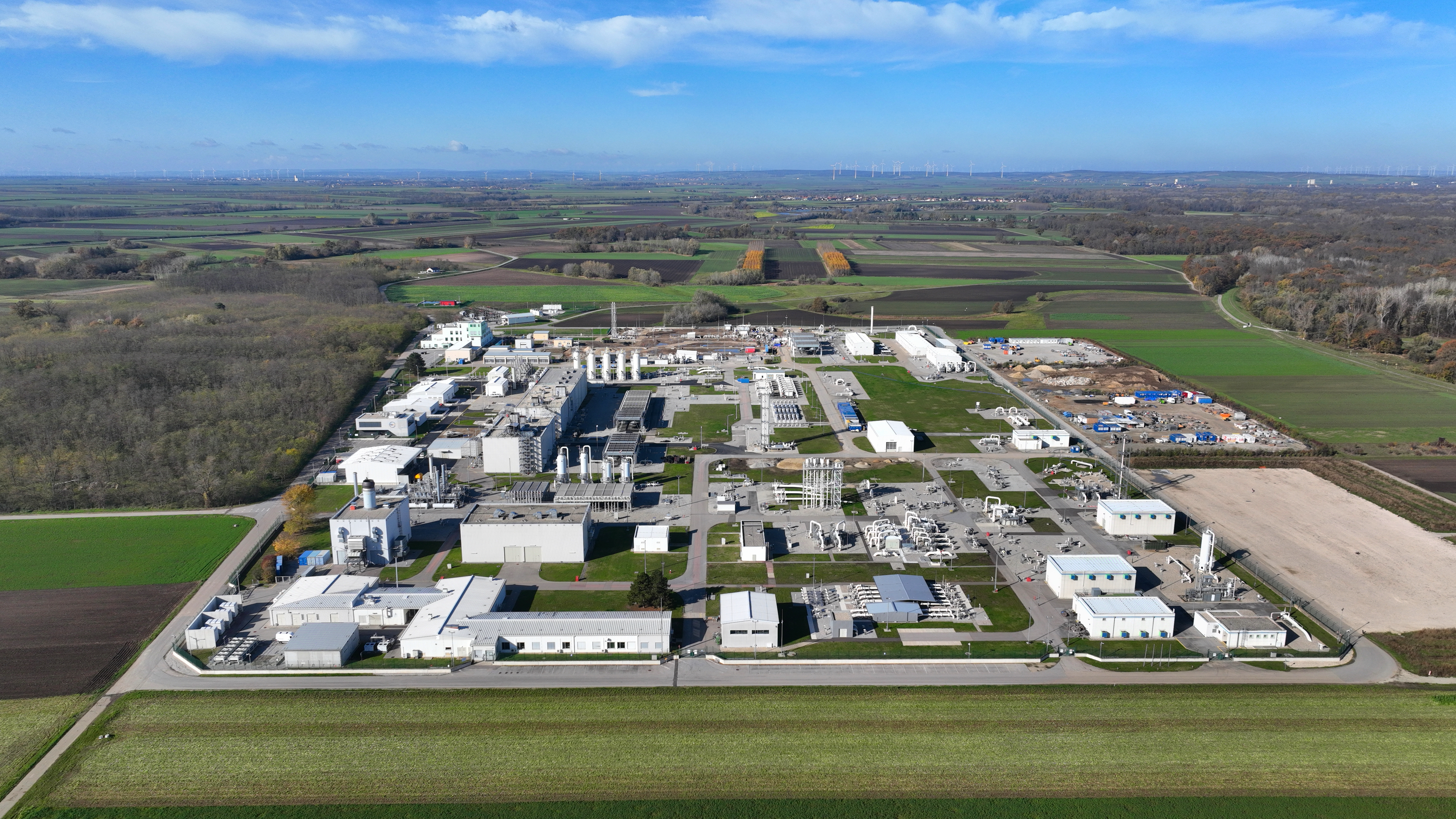
Natural gas station in Baumgarten

The gas reception facilities run by Gas Connect Austria and by TAG GmbH, the operator of the Trans Austria Gasleitung (TAG) pipeline, are located on an 18 hectare (ha) site. The facilities include equipment like filter separators, gas dryer units, several compressor units (some of them electric), gas coolers and metering sections. Incoming gas deliveries are compressed and then pumped into the West-Austria-Gasleitung (WAG) and TAG pipelines. Part of the gas is also transported to Hungary via the Hungaria Austria Gasleitung (HAG).

Gas reserves are stored in the underground facilities in Tallesbrunn and Schönkirchen, both of which are depleted gas fields. Imported gas is pumped into these storage plants. There are also underground storage facilities in Thann and Puchkirchen in Upper Austria, and in Haidach bei Strasswalchen on the border between Salzburg and Upper Austria. The storage facilities in Puchkirchen and Haidach are operated by Rohöl-Aufsuchungs Aktiengesellschaft (RAG). The total volume of gas at Austria's storage plants is sufficient to cover the annual consumption of Austria.

== 2017 explosion ==
On 12 December 2017, an explosion on the premises of the gas distribution center left one person dead and 21 injured. The blast cut off supplies from the hub to southern Europe for a short period, prompting Italy to declare a state of emergency.
