= Gas in Turkey =

Production, transport and consumption of gases such as methane in Turkey

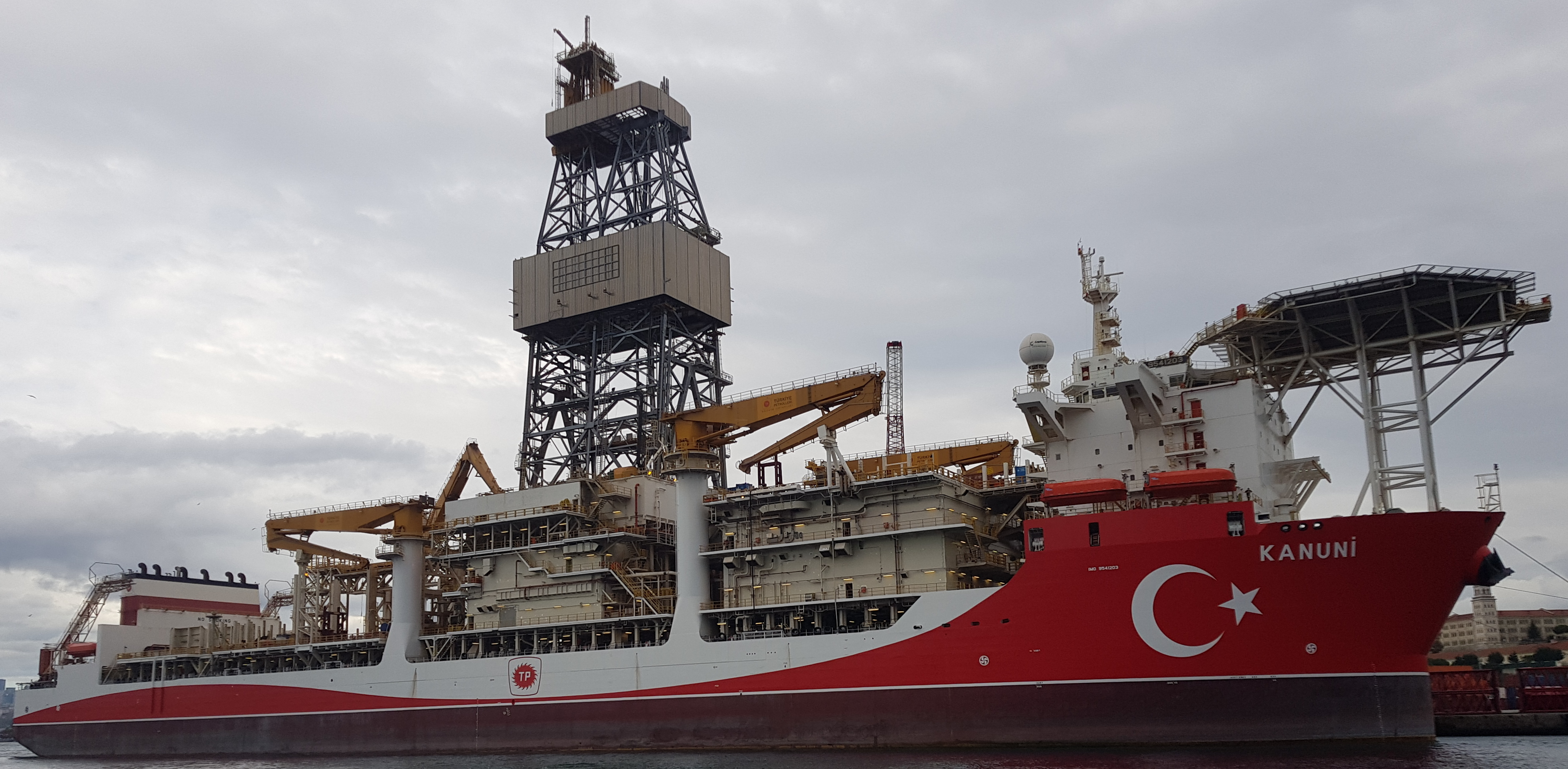
The Kanuni has drilled in the Black Sea.

Natural gas supplies over a quarter of Turkey's energy. The country consumes 50 to 60 billion cubic metres of natural gas each year, nearly all of which is imported. A large gas field in the Black Sea started production in 2023.

After the 2022 Russian invasion of Ukraine several European countries stopped buying Russian oil or gas, but Turkey's relations with Russia are good enough that it continues to buy both. Turkey receives much gas from Russia, which is cheaper than LNG. Households buy the most gas, followed by industry and power stations. Over 80% of the population has access to gas, and it supplies half the country's heating requirements. As the state-owned oil and gas wholesaler BOTAŞ has 80% of the gas market, the government can and does subsidize residential and industrial gas consumers. All industrial and commercial customers, and households using more than a certain amount of gas, can switch suppliers.

== History ==
Primary energy supply is about a quarter each from coal, oil, gas, and other sources.

The General Directorate of Mineral Research and Exploration was formed in 1935, but very little gas was found. The most efficient way of importing gas is by pipeline from nearby countries, and the first imports were from Russia in 1986, followed by Iran. However, the pipeline from Azerbaijan only started transferring gas in 2007.

Liquefied natural gas (LNG) was first imported from Algeria in 1994 and from Nigeria in 1999. In the early 21st century gas consumption increased. Between 2000 and 2020 the share of imported energy increased from just over 50% to 70%.

In 2019, the European Council objected to Turkish drilling in the eastern Mediterranean. In 2022, a gas shutoff by Iran caused problems for industry. Some analysts say that Turkey does not have enough gas storage or alternative supplies to resist pressure, and that when Russia says it is closing a gas pipeline for maintenance (for example a 10-day shutdown of Bluestream in 2022 at 2 days notice) this is sometimes intended to apply political pressure. In 2022, the increase in global gas prices increased the current account deficit as more gas was bought on the spot market.

== Geopolitics ==
Unlike several European countries, which stopped buying or were cut off from Russian oil or gas, after the 2022 Russian invasion of Ukraine, relations with Russia are such that Turkey continues to buy both. China and Turkey import the most gas from Russia. It is said to sometimes be difficult for media in Turkey to report fully on energy geopolitics. President Erdoğan said in 2022 that Turkey could not join sanctions on Russia because of import dependency.

Turkey's state-owned oil and gas exploration and production company TPAO hopes to explore for oil and gas in Libyan waters: a memorandum of understanding was agreed with Libya but later suspended by a Libyan court. Turkey opposes some gas exploration by the Republic of Cyprus because of the Cyprus–Turkey maritime zones dispute.

The Northern Iraq two rival parties Patriotic Union of Kurdistan (PUK) and Kurdistan Democratic Party (KDP) would have to agree for a new pipeline to take the shortest route, as it would come from wells in the part of the Kurdistan Region controlled by the PUK and pass through the part controlled by the KDP. In 2022 the Islamic Revolutionary Guard Corps used missiles to strike a house belonging to Baz Karim Barzanji, a businessman working on a new pipeline, reportedly because he had met American and Israeli officials there. In 2025 supply from Turkmenistan via Iran was stopped by US sanctions pressure.

== Impact and future ==
Emissions from gas have increased, but remain below coal and oil.

The largest source of greenhouse gas emissions by Turkey is coal power, which emits about 1000 grams of the greenhouse gas carbon dioxide for every kilowatt-hour of electricity generated. To generate the same amount of electricity gas emits less than coal, (371g in 2020), but far more than solar at 30g to 60g. When gas is produced in Russia or Turkmenistan, however, methane leaks release a greenhouse gas. But, as the international greenhouse gas inventory is based on where it is produced, this is accounted for in Russia's greenhouse gas emissions not Turkey's.

Turkey intends to increase the share of renewables and nuclear power in the national energy mix. According to a May 2022 report from thinktank Ember, solar and wind saved 7 billion US dollars on gas imports in the preceding 12 months. Some distribution companies are testing mixing up to 20% hydrogen with natural gas, so that eventually some of the gas distributed would be green hydrogen.

Earthquakes can be a danger to pipelines. In neighbouring Iran electrification, for example with heat pumps, away from gas has been suggested to improve earthquake resilience.

== Supply and demand ==
=== Supply ===
There are many sources of supply in the region and enough LNG import capacity in the country.

In 2020 Fatih, one of five drillships belonging to state-owned oil and gas company TPAO, discovered the Sakarya Gas Field under the Black Sea near where Romania has also found gas. Before 2023, when production from this sweet gas field in the Black Sea started, almost all natural gas consumed in Turkey was imported. South Akcakoca Sub-Basin (SASB) is a small gas field also in the Black Sea. As well as drillships there are 2 seismic ships. Turkish Black Sea reserves are estimated at a trillion cubic metres: gas will be piped to Filyos for processing to make it suitable for the gas grid, with peak production of 40 billion cubic metres (bcm) targeted for 2026. Turkish Black Sea gas is expected to eventually meet almost a third of national gas demand, with 15 billion cubic metres (bcm) annually by 2030. According to some commentators, with this discovery, the Aegean dispute with Greece over exploratory drilling is now unnecessary.

Gas imports of Turkey

Almost half of the country's gas is imported from Russia. In 2021 contracts with Russian energy company Gazprom were renewed and linked to the EU price; they included a four-year deal to the end of 2025 for 5.75 bcm a year through TurkStream (which has total capacity 31.5 bcm). The contract price has not been published but was reported (in 2022 by media opposed to the Turkish ruling parties) to be based on 70% of the LNG spot market price plus the Brent Crude oil price: this is much more expensive than the Blue Stream gas. Turkey's pipeline contracts with Russia were extended and are now due to expire at the end of 2026.

US sanctions on Iran do not apply to pipeline imports of gas. LNG import share varies but typically about a quarter of gas imports are LNG. Total spot import was 6.9 bcm in 2021: spot can also be imported by pipeline. Total entry capacity in 2021 was 362 mcm/day. BOTAŞ would like to import from Northern Iraq, but completing the Iraqi part of the pipeline is mired in disputes between the Iraq central government and Kurdistan Regional Government. However some gas in Iraq is wasted by flaring so Iraq would benefit by selling that. Turkey suspects winter cuts in long-term low-price contracted supply from Iran are not technical faults but Iran keeping the gas for its own use.

In 2021 a contract was agreed with Azerbaijan to import 11 bcm more per year until the end of 2024. TPAO has a 19% share in Shah Deniz 1. Fracking shale gas might help with energy security. Gas supply from Turkmenistan has been planned for decades but a pipeline under the Caspian Sea has not yet been built, partly due to lack of an agreement between Turkmenistan and Azerbaijan. Instead in 2025 Turkey bought over 1 bcma of Turkmen gas via a swap agreement with Iran, as there is spare pipeline capacity. The maximum possible is said (by backers of a rival route between at sea installations) to be only 3 bcma, but others say over 10 bcma is feasible. LNG is imported from several countries including Egypt, Algeria, Oman, and the United States.

=== Demand ===
Over 80% of the population, and all provinces in Turkey, have access to natural gas, which supplies half of household final energy. In 2021 consumption share included 27% households, 35% electricity production, 29% industry and 8% service sector. The Energy Ministry expects demand for gas to increase slightly to 2030, but its share of primary energy consumption to fall slightly to less than a quarter.

Electricity generation by gas (dull yellow) increases when hydropower (blue) falls due to drought.

In some years electricity generation in Turkey burns half the gas, but this varies greatly depending on whether there is enough rain to produce hydroelectricity; therefore, when it rains, Turkey burns less gas. Peak demand is typically in mid-winter, averaging almost 300 million cubic metres (mcm) each day, and the Chamber of Engineers said in 2022 that there was not enough storage. There are 72 distribution zones and 18 million households are supplied with gas. About half of residential energy demand is met by gas. The International Energy Agency predicted in 2021 that use for electricity generation will decline. However the national energy plan published in January 2023 forecasts over 10 GW more gas power may be needed by 2035 to balance variable renewable energy and for energy security. All industrial and commercial consumers, and households buying over 75 thousand cubic-meters a year can switch suppliers.

== Transport, processing and storage ==
Gas from Russia is mostly consumed within Turkey, but some transits to other countries such as Bulgaria, Romania, Hungary, Slovakia and Moldova. Some gas from Azerbaijan is bought by the EU.

There are many gas pipelines, and it may not be possible for Europeans to determine the origin of the gas they buy from Turkey, which could be a problem for EU countries as they are not likely to be able to legally buy Russian pipeline gas from 2027. Major gas pipelines (with capacity in bcm) are:

←	Out to west	Through	←	In from east	←
20	Trans-Balkan	Trans-Anatolian	16	TurkStream	32
16	Balkan Stream			Blue Stream	16
10	Trans Adriatic			South Caucasus	24
				Tabriz Ankara	14

Gas from Russia comes via the Blue Stream and TurkStream pipelines; and from Iran via the Tabriz–Ankara pipeline. Azerbaijan normally supplies Turkey through the South Caucasus Pipeline. Its gas flows onward through the Trans-Anatolian gas pipeline (TANAP) supplying Turkey and some continues across the Greek border into the Trans Adriatic Pipeline.

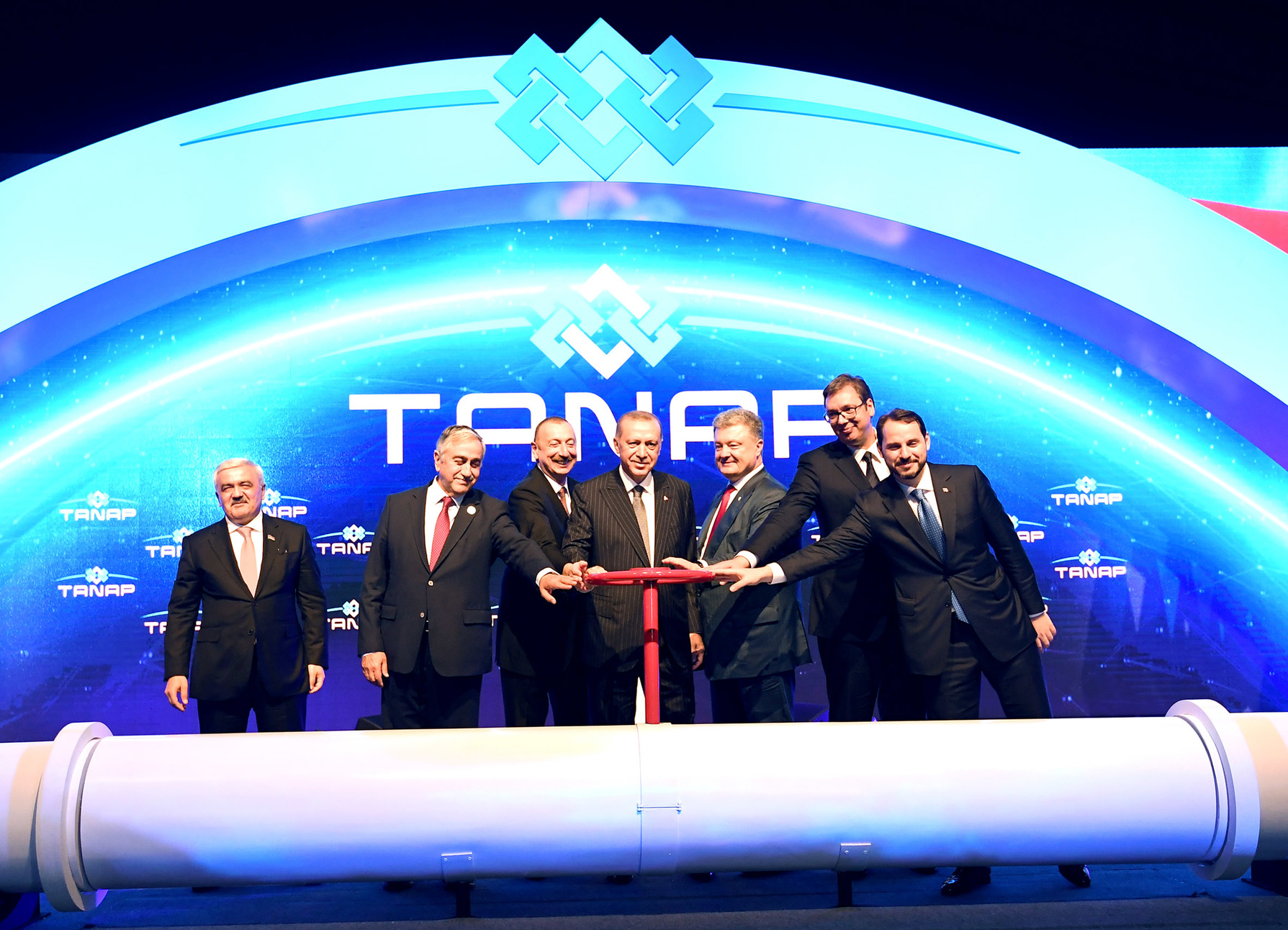
Trans-Anatolian gas pipeline inauguration in Eskişehir in 2018 (Rovnag Abdullayev - president SoCAR, → Mustafa Akıncı - President of Northern Cyprus, → Ilham Aliyev - President of Azerbaijan, → Recep Tayyip Erdoğan - President of Turkey, → Petro Poroshenko - President of Ukraine, → Aleksandar Vučić - President of Serbia, → Berat Albayrak - Minister of Energy and Natural Resources of Turkey)

The Tabriz–Ankara pipeline is a 2,600-kilometre (1,600-mile) natural gas pipeline, which runs from Tabriz in northwestern Iran to Ankara in Turkey. Blue Stream, a major trans-Black Sea pipeline, has been delivering natural gas from Russia to Turkey since 2003. The Southern Gas Corridor includes the Shah Deniz 2 gas field, the South Caucasus pipeline, TANAP, and the Trans Adriatic Pipeline: TANAP is being expanded to 31 bcm per year. In Erzurum, the South Caucasus Pipeline, which was commissioned in 2006, is linked to the Iran-Turkey pipeline. In 2022 Turkey's transit pipeline had 3 to 5 bcm spare capacity. As gas imports cost $12 to $15 billion per year and the lira is weak; they are a significant part of the import bill. Turkstream has about 60% spare capacity as of 2022.

LNG can transit to Bulgaria, but there have been complaints that the deal is against EU free market rules. Energy analysts doubt that Turkey will ever become a major gas transit country, and expect only Azeri gas transit to be significant. However a few European countries, such as Serbia and Hungary, import Russian gas via Turkstream. In 2021 Hungary's MVM Group and Gazprom signed a 15-year contract for 3.5 bcm to be supplied via Turk Stream and the Transbalkans pipeline, and in 2022 Hungary agreed 0.7 bcm per year more gas from Russia via Turk Stream. In 2022 about 2 bcm from Turkstream was sent to Romania through the Trans-Balkan pipeline, and exports to Moldova are starting in 2023. Export to Ukraine through the Transbalkan has been technically possible since 2022, and has been discussed between the 2 governments, although Ukraine may be able to produce enough gas for its own needs. The Turkey Bulgaria interconnector at 3.5 bcm a year may become a bottleneck.

Black Sea gas is processed at Filyos. Marmara Ereğlisi is a major LNG terminal, and the other two are Egegaz Aliağa LNG Storage Facility and Etki Liman LNG Facility. In 2023 Turkey has 5 LNG terminals including the floating storage regasification units (FSRU) MT Botaş FSRU Ertuğrul Gazi and Botaş Saros FSRU Terminal. FSRU may supply Bulgaria in future. About 160 mcm can be regasified each day, which is the winter peak of household demand or half total demand. As of 2026 there is about 6 bcm of storage, there is also a goal to almost double the 2022 Silivri and Lake Tuz storage to total 10 bcm. Gas is piped to the Azeri exclave of Nakhchivan.

== Economics and consumption ==
gas contracts

According to BOTAŞ the price of gas for Turkish households was the lowest in Europe in 2022, and they said residential customers were getting 70% price support from the government. There are 72 gas distribution companies, with over 13 million consumers. There is a biennial trade fair in Istanbul.

Both national gas development and BOTAŞ are subsidised by the government. In 2021 households were subsidized 80 billion lira ($7 billion) for gas - about 4 times their electricity subsidy. Gas imports deplete foreign exchange reserves and many analysts say that imported oil and gas is a key weakness in the economy of Turkey. The country would like to become a hub to supply the EU, however EU gas consumption is expected to decrease, so analyst Kadri Tastan says this is unlikely in the long term due to the EU green transition. Although already somewhat of a physical hub for gas, Turkey cannot become a trading hub as the market, which is operated by Energy Exchange Istanbul, is not a free market.

As of 2021 the annual gas import bill was around US$44 billion. But long-term contracts with Russia and Iran will expire in the 2020s. The contract to import from Iran expires in 2026. Private companies are not allowed to enter into new pipeline gas contracts with countries that have contracts with the state-owned oil and gas wholesaler BOTAŞ. Although private companies can contract for LNG they cannot buy at the same price as BOTAŞ. Some imports from Russia are linked to the oil price, for example the BOTAŞ contract for import via Blue Stream, which expires at the end of 2025. Solar and wind power are much cheaper than gas power. Gas prices for industry and power plants are more than double the household price, and are often increased due to falls in value of the lira. In 2022 BOTAŞ borrowed from Deutsche Bank to buy LNG.

In 2023 Vitaly Yermakov, Senior Research Fellow at the Oxford Institute for Energy Studies wrote: "Until 2022 Gazprom sales to Turkey were subject to oil-indexation, but at the end of 2021 this was replaced by hub indexation. (Turkey insisted on the change hoping it would receive lower prices, probably in reference to 2020, but has been shocked by the tremendous gas hub price spikes through the end of 2021 and into 2022 and 2023. Turkey has since asked Gazprom for a postponement of payments and begged for discounts)." He also said that Turkey's negotiating power with Russia for gas discounts is greater than it was before the 2022 invasion of Ukraine. A quarter of Russian gas is paid for in rubles. In late 2022 Turkey was reported to have asked Russia for a discount on gas, but prices are expected to remain high until the end of 2024 or 2026, with the 2023 price estimated by Bloomberg at around 500 USD per thousand cubic metres (compared to 300 for Russian sales to China) only slightly falling to 2026. In 2024 the Energy Ministry said there were 357 gas-fired power stations in Turkey. Several LNG deals were signed in 2024 and 2025, some of them with prices related to Henry hub.

=== Subsidies and taxes ===
The wholesale gas market is not as competitive in Turkey as it is in the EU: some analysts say that this is because the government does not want to split up the state-owned gas company BOTAŞ, or give other power companies fair use of BOTAŞ' pipelines. They say Turkey has not joined the European gas network (ENTSO-G) because joining would require this unbundling. BOTAŞ controls over 90% of the natural gas market, and is the gas infrastructure regulator and the only operator of gas transmission. Exploration for gas in the Eastern Mediterranean is subsidised, and is a cause of geopolitical tension because of the Cyprus dispute.

A capacity market (or capacity mechanism) for electricity is payments to make sure that sufficient firm power is available to satisfy peaks in demand, such as late afternoon air conditioning in August. Because gas-fired power stations can usually ramp up and down quickly they are one way of ensuring supply at times of peak demand. Some other countries also have capacity markets but Turkey's has been criticised. The government says the purpose of capacity market payments is to secure national electricity supply. However, despite almost all natural gas being imported, some gas-fired power plants received capacity payments in 2021, whereas some non-fossil firm power, such as demand response, could not. 17 gas-fired power stations were eligible for capacity payments in 2023.

=== Companies ===
Akfel Gas Group is state-owned, and there are four private importers of gas. Bosphorus Gaz, Bati Hat and Kibar Holding applied to import from Russia through the 6 bcm a year Trans-balkan pipeline in 2022, but the agreement for BOTAŞ to import gas through that pipeline ended that year. Not all the 10 bcm contracted from Russia is actually flowing, possibly due to debts due to Gazprom by the companies. Only BOTAŞ is importing LNG. In 2022 the Turkish Energy Minister said that Turkey and Algeria would create a joint oil and gas exploration company.
