= MT MOL FSRU Challenger =

History

The Bahamas
- Name: MOL FSRU Challenger
- Owner: MOL LNG Transport (Europe) Ltd.
- Operator: MOL LNG Transport (Europe) Ltd.
- Builder: Daewoo Shipbuilding & Marine Engineering
- Christened: 28 September 2017
- Completed: 10 October 2017
- In service: 2017
- Homeport: Nassau
- Identification: IMO number: 9713105; MMSI number: 311000505; Callsign: C6CL5

General characteristics
- Type: LNG Carrier
- Tonnage: 169,293 GT; 151,500 DWT
- Length: 345.50 m (1,133 ft 6 in)
- Beam: 55.00 m (180 ft 5 in)
- Draft: 10.70 m (35 ft 1 in)
- Speed: max. 18.0 knots (33.3 km/h; 20.7 mph)
- Capacity: storage 263×10^{3} m^{3} (9.3×10^{6} cu ft); regasification 23×10^{6} m^{3}/d (800×10^{6} cu ft/d) at 1 atm

MT MOL FSRU Challenger is a Bahamas-flagged liquefied natural gas (LNG) carrier, which is currently laid up in Hong Kong.

== Characteristics ==
The vessel was built for the Japanese shipping company Mitsui O.S.K. Lines (MOL) at Okpo shipyard of Daewoo Shipbuilding & Marine Engineering in South Korea. She was named MOL FSRU Challenger at a ceremony held at the shipyard on 28 September 2017. With an LNG storage capacity of 263,000 m^{3} (9,300,000 cu ft), she is the world's largest floating storage and regasification unit (FSRU). The regasification capacity is 800 million standard cubic feet per day. She features LNG re-shipment and gas transfer capabilities. She is able to re-export LNG and supply the neighboring regions around her with LNG.

She was delivered to her owner, the Mitsui O.S.K. Lines (MOL) LNG Transport (Europe) Ltd. on 10 October 2017. The vessel is 345.50 m (1,133 ft 6 in) long, has a beam of 55.00 m (180 ft 5 in) and a draft of 10.70 m (35 ft 1 in). At 151,500 DWT, she has a service speed of 18.0 knots (33.3 km/h; 20.7 mph). She sails under the flag of The Bahamas with home port Nassau.

== Charter operations ==
In 2016, before the delivery of the vessel, the Gas Sayago Company in Uruguay signed a formal agreement to charter the FSRU. However, due to delays, the deal was terminated without realization.

=== Turkey ===
BOTAŞ, the Turkish state-owned company for crude oil and natural gas pipelines, chartered the vessel under a short-term contract to be used as an offshore storage terminal. She sailed to eastern Mediterranean Sea arriving at Dörtyol, Hatay Province in November the same year. On 7 February 2018, she went in operation at the Botaş Dörtyol LNG Storage Facility. She is the second FSRU after MT GDF Suez Neptune, which serves at Egegaz Aliağa LNG Storage Facility in western Turkey.

=== Hong Kong ===
The ship owner announced in June 2018 that the vessel will go into service at the Hong Kong Offshore LNG Terminal to supply Hong Kong, the Black Point Power Station located at New Territories and Lamma Power Station at Lamma Island with natural gas after the completion of the facility by the end of 2020.
