= Tabriz–Ankara pipeline =

Natural gas pipeline in Iran and Turkey

Location
- Country: Iran, Turkey
- Direction: south–north
- Start: Tabriz, Iran
- Passes through: Erzurum
- To: Ankara, Turkey

General information
- Type: natural gas
- Partners: National Iranian Oil Company, BOTAŞ
- Commissioned: 2001

Technical information
- Maximum discharge: 14 billion cubic meters per year

The Tabriz–Ankara pipeline is a 2,577-kilometre (1,601 mi) long natural gas pipeline, which runs from Tabriz in north-west Iran to Ankara in Turkey.

== History ==
The construction of the pipeline started in 1996 after signing a gas deal between Turkish and Iranian governments. The gas deal was signed on 30 August 1996. The pipeline was commissioned in July 2001.

The Iran-Turkey pipeline was allegedly blown up several times by PKK fighters. In January 2008 gas supplies were stopped because of cut-off gas supplies from Turkmenistan. The supply was cut off again in February 2008 because of bad weather conditions.

== Technical features ==
The Turkish section, operated by BOTAŞ, cost US$600 million. The pipeline capacity is 14 bcm per year: About 11 billion cubic meters of a year of gas in Turkey is imported through the pipeline. Just before Ankara it is linked to Blue Stream.

== Contracts ==
Negotiations are in progress to renew the current 25 year contract, for nearly 10 bcm per year, which expires mid-2026.

== See also ==
- Iran-Turkey relations
