= Balkan pipeline =

Balkan pipeline may refer to:

- Balkan Stream, a natural gas pipeline from Turkey to Hungary
- Trans-Balkan pipeline, a natural gas pipeline between Turkey and Ukraine
