= Tekirdağ gas power plant =

Gas-fired power station in Turkey

- Country: Turkey
- Coordinates: 41°00′26″N 27°58′25″E
- Owner: Electricity Generation Company

Power generation
- Nameplate capacity: 956 MW

Tekirdağ gas power plant (Turkish: Tekirdağ Doğalgaz Kombine Çevrim Santrali) is a gas-fired power station in Tekirdağ Province northwestern Turkey with units A and B which are a few hundred meters apart.

The electric power plant is situated at Sultanköy in Marmara Ereğlisi of Tekirdağ Province, around 100 km (62 mi) west of Istanbul. It is adjacent to the Marmara Ereğlisi LNG Storage Facility. It is a combined cycle plant. The power plant and its electrical substation were built by the Swedish ASEA Brown Boveri (ABB) on a build–operate–transfer (BOT) basis, and went in service in 1999. The construction cost US$360 million. The plant was owned by the Turkish private power producer Uni-Mar Co., which is co-owned by the Japanese Marubeni and the Belgian Unit International, and operated by Engie.

The plant features combined cycle technology with gas and steam turbines. Natural gas-fired in the power plant is obtained from the state-owned crude oil and natural gas pipelines and trading company BOTAŞ Petroleum Pipeline Corporation (BOTAS), which operates the neighboring LNG storage facility.

The ownership of Unimar Power Plant passed to the state-owned electricity generation company EÜAŞ in 2019 after the end of the BOT contract and its name was changed to Tekirdağ Doğalgaz Kombine Çevrim Santralı.
