= Durusu Terminal =

Natural gas storage facility in Turkey

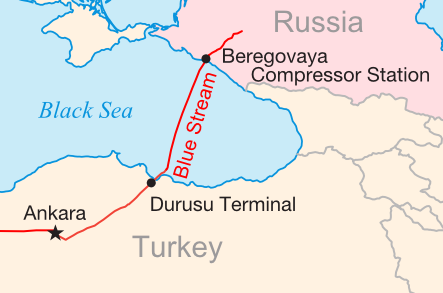

Durusu Terminal is a gas metering station in Turkey, located in Çarşamba district, nearly 60 km (37 mi) from the city of Samsun. The terminal is virtually on the sea side, in the immediate vicinity of surfacing of the Blue Stream sub-sea natural gas pipeline. The approximate size of the Durusu Terminal is 20 hectares (49 acres). It is an integral component of the Russian-Turkish Blue Stream project

== History ==
The foundation of the gas metering terminal was laid on 24 October 2000. The station was constructed by OHS Consortium, a joint venture between two Turkish companies Öztaş and Hazinedaroğlu and Russia's Stroytransgaz. The engineering and procurement was done by the Italian company Nuovo Pignone.

On 20 October 2002, the "golden welding" of the terminal to the pipeline was completed and starting on 30 December 2002, flow of natural gas from Russia to Turkey through Blue Stream was commenced.

== Purpose and operation ==
The main purpose of the station is to lower and measure the pressure of incoming gas. It is designed for incoming flowing pressure of 200 atm (20,000 kPa), which is then reduced down to 75 atm (7,600 kPa) for further distribution to local gas transporting system. Rated capacity of the station is 2 million cubic meters per hour. Control and management of the station is automated. Metering of transported gas is done by representatives of BOTAŞ on the Turkish side and Gazprom Export on the Russian side.
