= SASB =

SASB may refer to:

- South Akcakoca Sub-Basin gas field
- Sustainability Accounting Standards Board
