= Marmara Ereğlisi =

- District and municipality
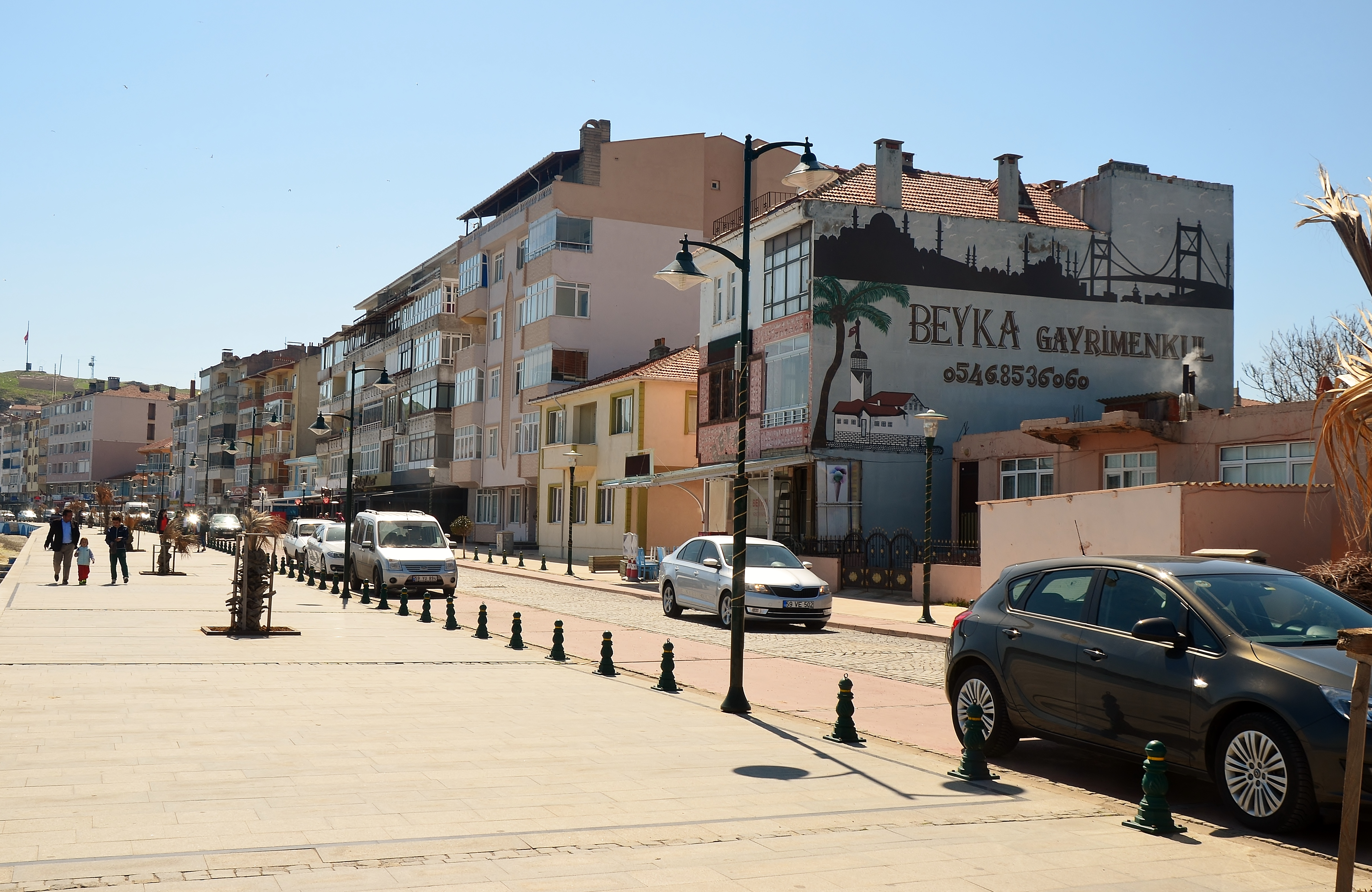
- Promenade in Marmara Ereğlisi

- Logo

- Map showing Marmara Ereğlisi District in Tekirdağ Province

- Location within Turkey Location within Marmara
- Coordinates: 40°58′11″N 27°57′19″E
- Country: Turkey
- Province: Tekirdağ

Government
  - Mayor: Mustafa Onur Bozkurter (CHP)
- Area: 175 km^{2} (68 sq mi)
- Elevation: 10 m (33 ft)
- Population (2022): 29,549
  - Density: 169/km^{2} (437/sq mi)
- Time zone: UTC+3 (TRT)
- Postal code: 59740
- Area code: 0282
- Website: www.marmaraereglisi.bel.tr

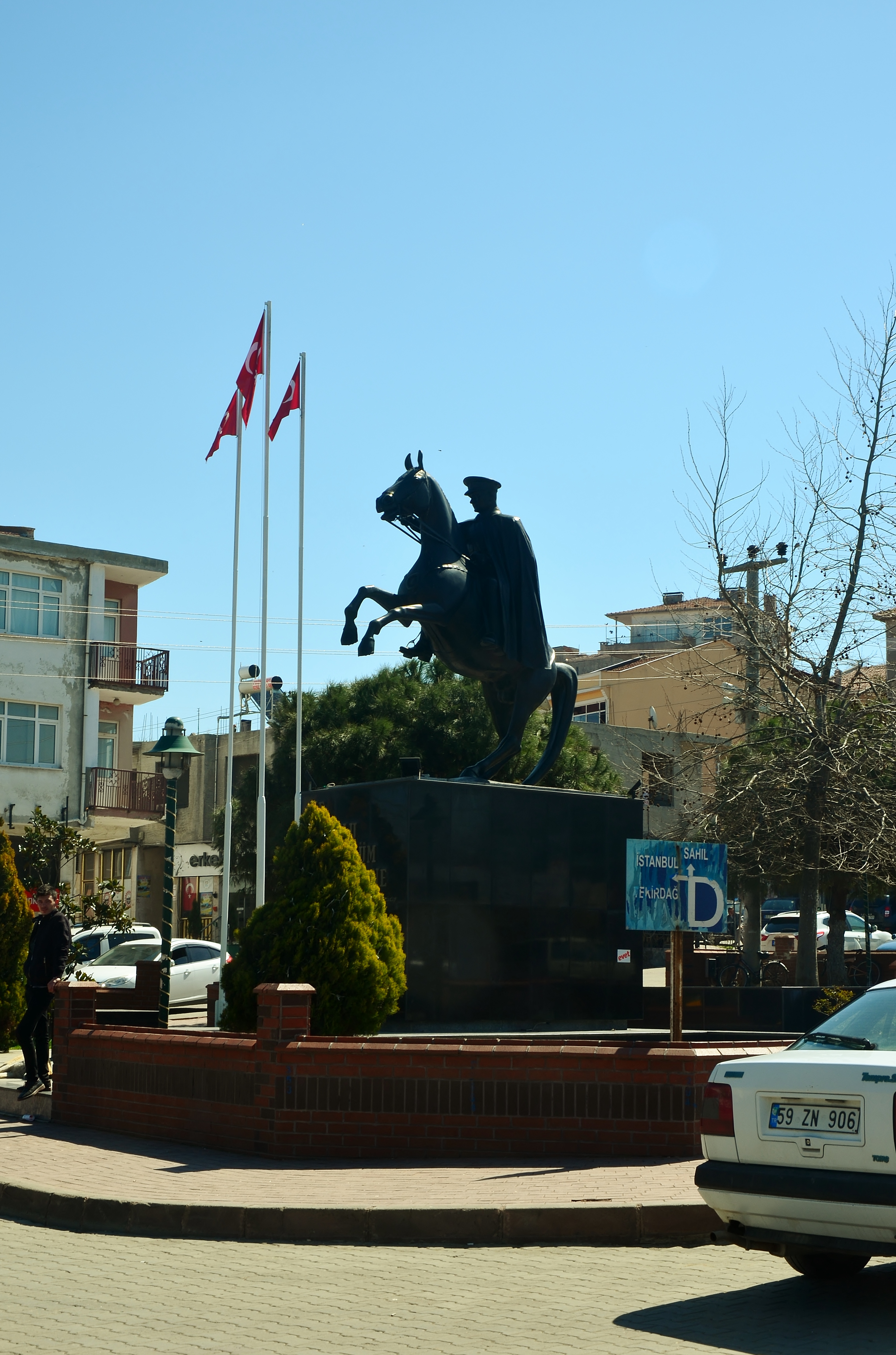
Statue of Mustafa Kemal Atatürk in Marmara Ereğlisi.

Marmara Ereğlisi (Turkish: [ˈmaɾmaɾa æɾeːlisi]; Greek: Ηράκλεια), also spelled Marmaraereğlisi, is a municipality and district of Tekirdağ Province, Turkey. Its area is 175 km^{2}, and its population is 29,549 (2022).

== Facts ==
Ereğli is 30 km east of the town of Tekirdağ, and 90 km west of Istanbul near a small pointed headland on the north shore of the Marmara Sea. It is called Marmara Ereğlisi (or Marmara Ereğli in colloquial usage) to distinguish it from the two other large towns in Turkey with the name Ereğli (deriving from the Greek name Heraclea), one in Konya Province (Konya Ereğlisi), the other on the Black Sea coast (Karadeniz Ereğli).

== History ==
The town, originally a Samian colony, was founded as Perinthos (Greek: Πέρινθος), in English usually known by its Latinized form as Perinthus. In about 300 AD, it was given the name of Heraclea (Ἡράκλεια). It was built amphitheatre-like on the hillside of a cape extending into the Sea of Marmara, close to where the modern town stands. Its port and its position at the junction of several sea-routes, made it a town of commercial importance. It became famous because of its resistance to Philip II of Macedon in 340 BC. Many of its coins have survived, and identify the festivals held there.

At an early date, according to tradition in the Apostolic Age, Heraclea became a Christian bishopric. As capital of the Roman province of Europa, it was the metropolitan see for all the bishoprics of the province, including Byzantium, which in 330 became Constantinople. Later on, Byzantine Emperor Justinian I would restore its aqueducts and palace. The see of Constantinople soon obtained superiority over Heraclea. However, Heraclea was recognized in the Notitia Episcopatuum of Pseudo-Epiphanius as having five suffragan sees: Panium, Callipolis, Chersonesus in Europa, Coela, and Rhaedestus. An early 10th-century Notitia Episcopatuum attributed to Leo VI the Wise lists the suffragans as 15 and another, dating from 1022–1025, puts them at 17. With the advance of the Ottoman conquests, the number of suffragans was severely reduced. In the early 20th century, it still had two suffragans. Today it is only a titular "Elder Metropolis and Exarchate of Thrace" of the Ecumenical Patriarchate of Constantinople. In the 13th century, there were Latin diocesan bishops of Heraclea. Today, the Catholic Church lists it as a titular see under the name "Heraclea in Europa".

== Eski Ereğli ==
In his 1815 account of his visit to the area, Edward Daniel Clarke stated that, in spite of its name, which means 'Old Ereğli or Heraclea', the village of Eski Ereğli (today Gümüşyaka in Silivri district), where he hoped to find antiquities, had scarcely any ancient remains, and he was informed that it was the coastal village known locally as Büyük Ereğli (Big Ereğli or Big Heraclea), about two hours (six miles) distant, that corresponded to the ancient city of Heraclea.

Eski Ereğli corresponds instead to the ancient town and bishopric of Daunium. This appears as a bishopric for the first time in the early 10th century in the above-mentioned list of Leo VI the Wise. Its bishop Thomas took part in the Second Council of Nicaea in 787 and Clemens in the Photian Council of Constantinople (879). Like Heraclea, it had a Latin bishop in the time of the Latin Empire of Constantinople (1204–1261). No longer a residential bishopric, Daonium is today listed by the Catholic Church as a titular see.

== Composition ==
There are 10 neighbourhoods in Marmara Ereğlisi District:

- Bahçelievler
- Ceditalipaşa
- Çeşmeli
- Dereağzı
- Kamaredere
- Mustafa Kemal Paşa
- Sultanköy
- Türkmenli
- Yakuplu
- Yeniçiftlik

== Holiday resorts ==
Ereğli is a small town, quiet in winter. There is a long coastline and the sea is clean enough for swimming (not true of much of the Marmara) and the coast on either side of Ereğli is lined with hotels and compounds of holiday properties serving people from Istanbul, who come to relax in the summer sunshine. Ereğli is only an hour's drive from Istanbul and on a summer Sunday evening the road is a queue of returning weekenders.

The holiday compounds are complicated mazes of little roads tightly packed with villas or buildings of holiday flats, leading down to the sea. Some of them have cafes and restaurants on the seafront, sometimes open to people from outside the compound. In places there are public beaches, although very crowded on summer weekends, and paths for children to play on bicycles. These holiday homes are family places and not all the compounds have nightlife.

== The town and villages ==
The town of Ereğli and its nearby villages are used by these weekenders and summer residents for fast food, grocery shopping, internet cafes and other amenities. The town itself is a mixture of large modern blocks and old country houses, both types mostly having been built without proper planning or architectural design. There is a small harbour. The people of Ereğli are a mixture of established families who have been in Thrace for generations and recently arrived migrant workers.

== Earthquakes ==
A large fault follows this coast, and the holiday housing of Ereğli is all vulnerable to damage from the inevitable earthquakes.

== Economy ==
Apart from tourism Ereğli has two natural harbors and three small ports. The natural gas company Botaş and also Total Petroleum have tanker ports. Large quantities of petroleum products are imported from Russia. There is a LNG storage facility and a natural gas-fired power plant on the point of the headland, in the village of Sultanköy.
