= Filyos Natural-gas Processing Plant =

- Location within Turkey
- Location: Filyos, Çaycuma, Zonguldak, Turkey; 41°33′59″N 32°01′42″E

Refinery details
- Operator: BOTAŞ
- Owner: Ministry of Energy and Natural Resources

Filyos Natural-gas Processing Plant (Turkish: Filyos Doğal Gaz İşleme Tesisi) is a plant under construction for natural-gas processing located at the port of Filyos in Çaycuma district, Zonguldak Province, Turkey.

The plant will purify raw natural gas delivered by submarine pipelines from the offshore platforms on the Sakarya gas field in the Turkish part of the Black Sea. It is expected that the laying down of nearly 170 km (110 mi)-long pipeline undersea will start in June 2022. It is planned that the construction of the pipeline with pipes of 12 m (39 ft) length each will last around five months. The plant will be connected to the national natural gas pipeline system in the first quarter of 2023, and will eventually process 3.5 billion cubic metres a year. It is being constructed by TPAO, and will be run by BOTAŞ.
