= TurkStream =

Natural gas pipeline from Russia to Turkey

- Map of TurkStream

Location
- Country: Russia; Turkey
- Start: Russkaya compressor station near Anapa, Krasnodar Krai, Russia
- Passes through: Black Sea
- To: Kıyıköy, Turkey

General information
- Type: natural gas
- Operator: Gazprom (Russian onshore section, offshore section); BOTAŞ (Turkish onshore section)
- Pipe installer: Allseas
- Pipe layer: Audacia; Pioneering Spirit
- Construction started: May 2017
- Commissioned: 8 January 2020

Technical information
- Length: 930 km (580 mi)
- Maximum discharge: 31.5×10^{9} m^{3}/a (1.11×10^{12} cu ft/a)

TurkStream (Turkish: TürkAkım or Türk Akımı, Russian: Турецкий поток; former name: Turkish Stream) is a natural gas pipeline running from Russia to Turkey. It starts from Russkaya compressor station near Anapa in Russia's Krasnodar Region, crossing the Black Sea to the receiving terminal at Kıyıköy. Most gas flows onwards to the European Union via the Malkoçlar pipeline to Bulgaria.

== History ==
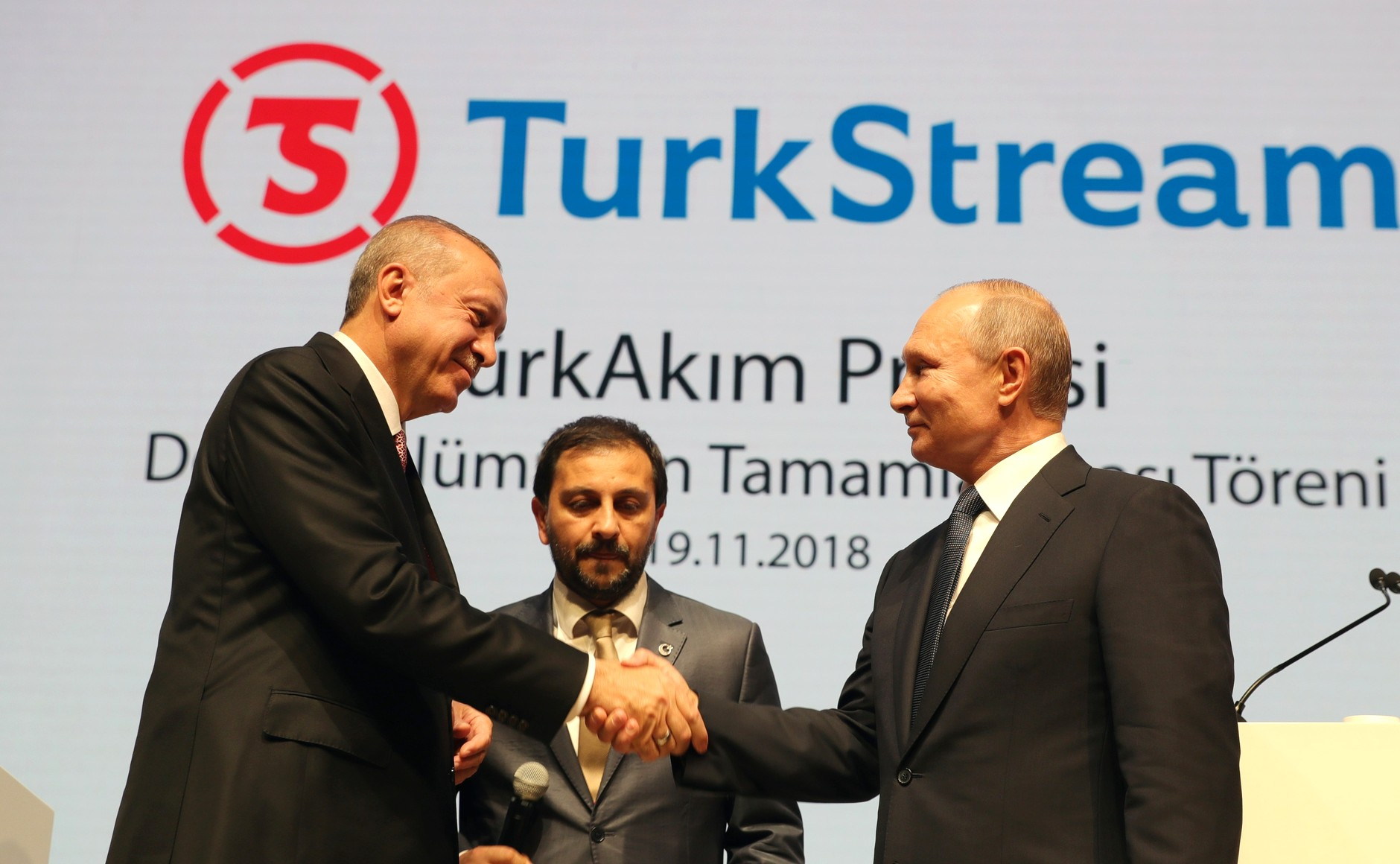
Turkish President Recep Tayyip Erdoğan and Russian President Vladimir Putin at the opening ceremony of TurkStream pipeline in Istanbul on 19 November 2018

The first direct gas pipeline between Russia and Turkey under the Black Sea was Blue Stream, which was commissioned in 2005. In 2009, Russia′s prime minister Vladimir Putin proposed the Blue Stream II line parallel to the original pipeline. The Blue Stream II project never took off and the South Stream project took the lead, until it was abandoned in 2014.

The TurkStream (then named Turkish Stream) project was announced by Russia′s president Vladimir Putin on 1 December 2014 during his state visit to Turkey, when a memorandum of understanding was signed between Gazprom and BOTAŞ. A permit to conduct engineering surveys for the Turkish offshore section was granted in July 2015. Also in July 2015, a memorandum of understanding between Greece and Russia was signed for the construction and operation of the TurkStream section in the Greek territory.

In November 2015, after the shooting down of a Russian Sukhoi Su-24, the project was unilaterally suspended by Russia. In late July 2016, following a reconciliation meeting in Moscow, both sides brought the project back to the table. On 10 October 2016, Russia and Turkey officially signed the intergovernmental agreement in Istanbul to execute the project.

A contract with an offshore contractor Allseas for laying the first line was signed on 8 December 2016 and the contract for the second line was signed on 20 February 2017. Laying of the first line in the Russian offshore section started on 7 May 2017. The ceremony of completing construction of the offshore section was held in Istanbul on 19 November 2018. The offshore section of the pipeline was filled with gas in November 2019.

Gazprom began shipping gas via TurkStream, including to Bulgaria and North Macedonia, on 1 January 2020, replacing supplies via the Trans-Balkan pipeline through Ukraine and Romania. The pipeline was inaugurated on 8 January 2020 by presidents Putin and Recep Tayyip Erdoğan.

The TurkStream project replaced the South Stream project that was cancelled in 2014. Following the shooting down of a Russian fighter jet by Turkey in November 2015, the project was temporarily halted. Russia–Turkey relations were restored in summer 2016 and the intergovernmental agreement for TurkStream was signed in October 2016. Construction started in May 2017 and gas deliveries to Bulgaria via the pipeline began on 1 January 2020.

According to Die Zeit, German investigators alleged that Ukraine attempted to sabotage the pipeline simultaneously with an operation against Nord Stream in 2022.

On 13 January 2025, the Russian defence ministry reported a failed Ukrainian drone attack on a TurkStream compressor station in the Krasnodar region, which Russia called an "act of energy terrorism". The attack happened after Ukraine refused to renew a five-year transit contract for Russian gas through Ukraine.

== Technical features ==
The pipeline is estimated to cost €11.4 billion. The pipeline has two lines with a total capacity of 31.5 billion m^{3}/a (1.11 trillion cu ft/a) of natural gas. The first line supplies Turkey and the second line allows the transport of natural gas further, to South East and Central Europe. Both lines are using pipes with an outer diameter of 810 mm (32 in), manufactured by Europipe GmbH of Germany, Vyksa Steel Works of OMK and Izhora Pipe Mill of Severstal of Russia, and a consortium of Marubeni, Itochu and Sumitomo of Japan. Pipes have a wall thickness of 39 mm (1.5 in) and a concrete coating of 80 mm (3.1 in). The internal pressure of the pipeline is 300 bars (4,400 psi). The pipeline is installed in water depths up to 2,200 m (7,200 ft).

== Route ==
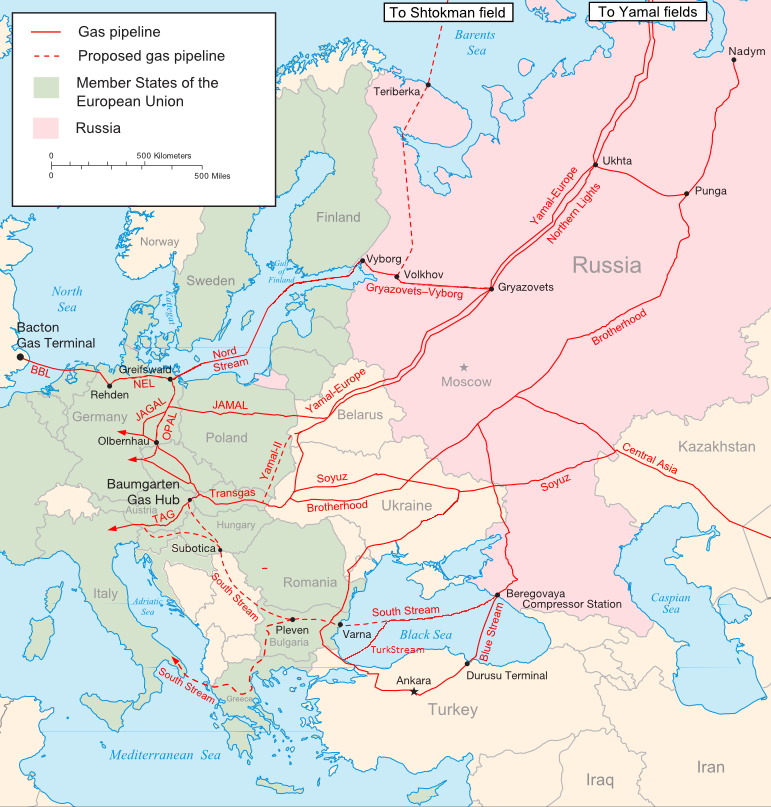
The TurkStream and Blue Stream pipelines connect Russia and Turkey under the Black Sea

TurkStream begins at the Russkaya compressor station near Anapa. It runs approximately 930 km (578 mi) offshore, of which approximately 230 km (140 mi) is located in the Russian maritime zones and approximately 700 km (435 mi) is located in the Turkish waters. The landing point in Turkey is Kıyıköy, a village in the district of Vize in Kırklareli Province at northwestern Turkey. From there, it continues from Kıyıköy to Malkoçlar into Bulgaria at the Turkey–Bulgaria border.

The further extension of the pipeline in South-East and Central European countries are responsibilities of involved countries. For the gas transport both existing infrastructure and construction of new pipelines will be used. For Gazprom the preferable option is to export gas from the second line to Bulgaria, Serbia, Hungary, Slovakia, and Austria. The route in Bulgaria starts on the Bulgaria–Turkey borders and runs by a reverse mode to the compressor station in Provadia, north-east of Bulgaria. From there, a new 474 km (295 mi) pipeline will run to the Bulgaria–Serbia border. New compressor stations will be built in Provadia and Rasovo. The Serbian part of the gas transport route begins near Zaječar on the Bulgaria–Serbia border and cross the Serbia–Hungary border near Horgoš. A connecting branch from Belgrade to Bosnia and Herzegovina is planned. The Hungarian section will be only 15 km (9.3 mi) long.

The other planned follow-on projects included also the Tesla pipeline, to run from Greece to North Macedonia, Serbia and Hungary, ending at the Baumgarten gas hub in Austria.

== Contractors ==
The project was implemented by South Stream Transport B.V., a subsidiary of Gazprom, which was originally established for the South Stream project. In the near-shore areas the offshore pipeline was laid by the pipe-laying vessel Audacia. For the deep part of the Black Sea, the pipe-laying vessel Pioneering Spirit was used.

The contractor for the Turkish section was Petrofac and the subcontractor for the construction of the receiving terminal in Turkey was Tekfen. Contractor for the onshore section to the Turkey–Bulgaria border was TurkAkim Gaz Tasima A. S. will carry out construction of the land section, a joint venture of Gazprom and BOTAŞ.

== Impact ==
TurkStream changes the regional gas flows in South-East Europe by diverting the transit through Ukraine and the Trans Balkan Pipeline system.

In 2022, Turkish President Recep Tayyip Erdoğan and Russian President Vladimir Putin planned for Turkey to become an energy hub for all of Europe. According to Aura Săbăduș, a senior energy journalist focusing on the Black Sea region, "Turkey would accumulate gas from various producers – Russia, Iran and Azerbaijan, [liquefied natural gas] and its own Black Sea gas – and then whitewash it and relabel it as Turkish. European buyers wouldn't know the origin of the gas."

After the cessation of gas transit through Ukraine to Europe at the beginning of 2025, TurkStream will be the only gas pipeline through which Russia can directly supply gas to Europe. By 2023, Russia's gas deliveries via TurkStream have already increased by 23% to 16.7 billion cubic meters. According to Gokhan Yardim, former manager of the state-owned energy company GOTA, this will open up the possibility of a further 15 billion cubic meters of gas transit. On 11 January 2025, Ukraine attacked a TurkStream gas compressor station in Russia with drones. However, the gas transport was not interrupted.

In 2024, Slovakia entered into a pilot contract to buy natural gas from Azerbaijan to reduce the impact of the Ukrainian closure of the pipeline for Russian supplies in 2025. Transfer may be via Russia and TurkStream.

== See also ==
- Balkan Stream
- Blue Stream
- Nabucco Pipeline
- South Caucasus Pipeline
- South Stream
- Trans Adriatic Pipeline
- Trans-Anatolian gas pipeline
- Trans-Caspian Gas Pipeline
