= MT Botaş FSRU Ertuğrul Gazi =

Turkey-flagged offshore support vessel

History

Turkey
- Name: Botaş FSRU Ertuğrul Gazi
- Namesake: Ertuğrul
- Owner: BOTAŞ
- Operator: BOTAŞ Trading IC
- Builder: Hyundai Heavy Industries, South Korea
- Cost: US$225 million
- Launched: 2 September 2020
- Completed: 17 March 2021; 4 years ago
- In service: 25 June 2021; 4 years ago
- Home port: Istanbul, Turkey
- Identification: IMO number: 9859820; MMSI number: 271048493; Callsign: TCA6267

General characteristics
- Class & type: FSRU
- Tonnage: 108,919 GT; 32,675 NT; 93,513 DWT
- Length: 295 m (968 ft)
- Beam: 46 m (151 ft)
- Height: 63 m (207 ft)
- Depth: 19.96 m (65.5 ft)
- Installed power: 28,402.84 bhp (21,179.99 kW)
- Capacity: 170,000 m^{3} (6,000,000 cu ft) LNG tank; 28,000,000 m^{3}/d (990,000,000 cu ft/d) Regasification rate

MT Botaş FSRU Ertuğrul Gazi is a South Korean-built Turkey-flagged offshore support vessel certified as a floating storage regasification unit (FSRU) for liquified natural gas (LNG). She is owned by the Turkish petroleum and natural gas pipeline corporation BOTAŞ, and operated by the Norwegian maritime company Wilhelmsen Ship Management, serving at Botaş Dörtyol LNG Storage Facility in southern Turkey. This is the country's first vessel of this type.

== History ==
The offshore support vessel was built for the Turkish petroleum and natural gas pipeline corporation BOTAŞ, at a budget cost of US$225 million, at Ulsan shipyard of Hyundai Heavy Industries. Testing of the vessel started after her launch on 2 September 2020. She was completed on 17 March 2021 after a delay of six months, and sailed to Turkey on 23 March. She is certified as a Floating Storage Regasification Unit (FSRU) for liquified natural gas (LNG) in accordance with the guidelines for LNG Regasification Vessels of the classification society American Bureau of Shipping (ABS). She was named Ertuğrul Gazi after Ertuğrul (died c. 1280/1281), who was the father of Osman I (r. c. 1280 – c. 1299), founder of the Ottoman Empire. FSRU Ertuğrul Gazi is the country's first vessel of this type.

The ship arrived in Dörtyol, Hatay Province, southern Turkey on 26 April 2021. Her home port is Istanbul, Turkey. She then undergwent final regasification trials on site. On 25 June the same year, she was commissioned at Botaş Dörtyol LNG Storage Facility, northeastern Mediterranean Sea replacing the chartered Bahamas-flagged MT MOL FSRU Challenger, the world's largest FSRU. She started her operations under the management of the Singapore-based Norwegian company Wilhelmsen Ship Management, transferring 132,000 m^{3} (4,700,000 cu ft) Algeria-based LNG from the Bahamas-flagged carrier LNG Berge Arzew and regasifying and pumping into the national pipeline network system on 29 June.

In 2022, BOTAŞ reported that the FSRU carried out a total of 24 ship-to-ship operations within twelve months. She transferred 2,100,000,000 m^{3} (7.4×10^{10} cu ft) of regasified natural gas into the national pipeline network system in one year, which is equivalent to about the six-months housing consumption of natural gas of Istanbul, which has a population of around 16 million.

== Characteristics ==
Ertuğrul Gazi is 295 m (968 ft) long, has a beam of 46 m (151 ft), a ship's depth of 19.96 m (65.5 ft) and a height of 64 m (210 ft). The ship's tonnages are 108,919 GT, 32,675 NT and 93,513 DWT. The ship is propelled by one engine of 28,402.84 bhp (21,179.99 kW).

The FSRU is capable of storing 170,000 m^{3} (6,000,000 cu ft) LNG, which is equivalent to 108,000,000 m^{3} (3.8×10^{9} cu ft) natural gas, and regasification of 28,000,000 m^{3}/d (990,000,000 cu ft/d) natural gas. Her daily regasification rate is among the highest in the world, and can meet 8.2% of the natural gas supplied to the system in Turkey on a daily basis. Turkey's annual natural gas consumption is 45,000,000–50,000,000 m^{3} (1.6×10^{9}–1.8×10^{9} cu ft).

The vessel's IMO number is 9859820 and the current MMSI number is 271048493. The vessel has the callsign TCA6267.
