= Balkan Stream =

Natural gas pipeline from Bulgaria to Hungary

- Route shown in red (Russia-occupied Ukrainian territory in pink)

Location
- Country: Turkey; Bulgaria; Serbia; Hungary
- Start: TurkStream
- Passes through: Bulgaria and Serbia
- To: Hungary

General information
- Type: natural gas
- Status: in operation
- Partners: Botaş, Bulgartransgaz, Srbijagas (Gazprom), FGSZ
- Construction started: 2018
- Commissioned: 2021

Technical information
- Length: 880 km (550 mi)
- Diameter: 1,200 mm (47 in)

Balkan Stream is a pipeline which transports Russian natural gas from Turkey to Bulgaria, Serbia and, until September 2027, Hungary. It is an extension of Turk Stream. Annual capacity is almost 16 bcm from Turkey and 13.88 bcm onwards to Serbia. Under EU sanctions rules Hungary must stop buying Russian gas by the end of September 2027.
