= Filyos =

- Municipality
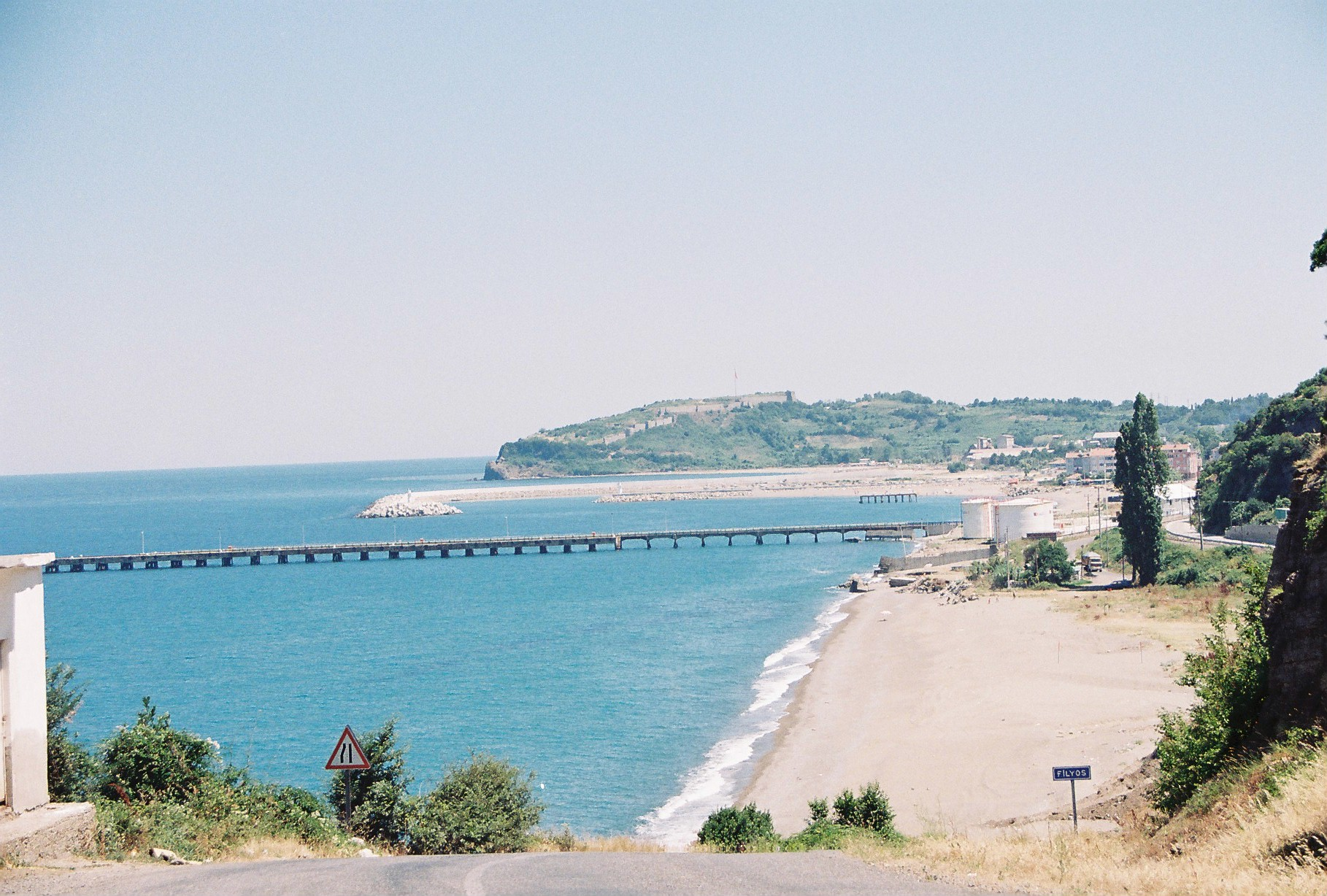
- Filyos Bay

- Location within Turkey
- Coordinates: 41°33′N 32°01′E
- Country: Turkey
- Province: Zonguldak
- District: Çaycuma
- Elevation: 40 m (130 ft)
- Population (2022): 4,847
- Time zone: UTC+3 (TRT)
- Postal code: 67660
- Area code: 0372

Filyos (Hisarönü) is a town (belde) in the Çaycuma District, Zonguldak Province, Turkey. Its population is 4,847 (2022). It is a coastal town of the Black Sea Region, situated at the mouth of the Filyos River. It is 18 kilometres (11 mi) to Çaycuma and 27 kilometres (17 mi) to Zonguldak. In the ancient history the name of the town was Tieion referring to the founder of the town. The settlement was declared a seat of township in 1954. The main economic activity of the town is firebrick industry. Tourism is also promising.

== See also ==
- Filyos Natural-gas Processing Plant
