= Botaş Dörtyol LNG Storage Facility =

Coordinates: 36°52′04″N 36°09′02″E

Botaş Dörtyol LNG Storage Facility (Turkish: Botaş Dörtyol Yüzer LNG Terminali) is a floating storage and regasification unit (FSRU) for liquefied natural gas (LNG) in Hatay Province, southern Turkey. It is the country's second floating LNG storage facility after the Egegaz Aliağa LNG Storage Facility.

The floating LNG storage facility is the world's largest vessel MT MOL FSRU Challenger, which was chartered by the Turkish state-owned crude oil and natural gas pipelines and trading company BOTAŞ. The FSRU was delivered to its owner, the Mitsui O.S.K. Lines (MOL) LNG Transport (Europe) Ltd. in October 2017, and then sailed to Turkey, arriving at its Mediterranean seaport Dörtyol in November the same year. The FSRU terminal went into service on 7 February 2018.

The special vessel has an LNG storage capacity of 263,000 m^{3} (2,200,000 cu ft), and features a regas discharge capacity of 540,000,000 m^{3}/d (1.9×10^{10} cu ft/d). With the use of the FSRU as an import terminal, minimization of the investment costs for transmission and distribution lines as well as of the transportation costs is aimed.

The chartered MT MOL FSRU Challenger was replaced by the new Turkish FSRU MT Botaş FSRU Ertuğrul Gazi commissioned on 25 June 2021.

== See also ==
- Egegaz Aliağa LNG Storage Facility,
- Lake Tuz Natural Gas Storage,
- Northern Marmara and Değirmenköy (Silivri) Depleted Gas Reservoir,
- Marmara Ereğlisi LNG Storage Facility.
