= Energy Exchange Istanbul =

- Location: Istanbul, Türkiye
- Founded: 2015

Energy Exchange Istanbul (EXIST) or Enerji Piyasaları İşletme A.Ş. (EPİAŞ), is an energy exchange. It trades electricity in Turkey and gas in Turkey. One of its largest shareholders is the Istanbul stock market. It has a partnership with Nigerian Bulk Electricity PLC.
