= Arkhipo-Osipovka =

Arkhipo-Osipovka Архипо-Осиповка
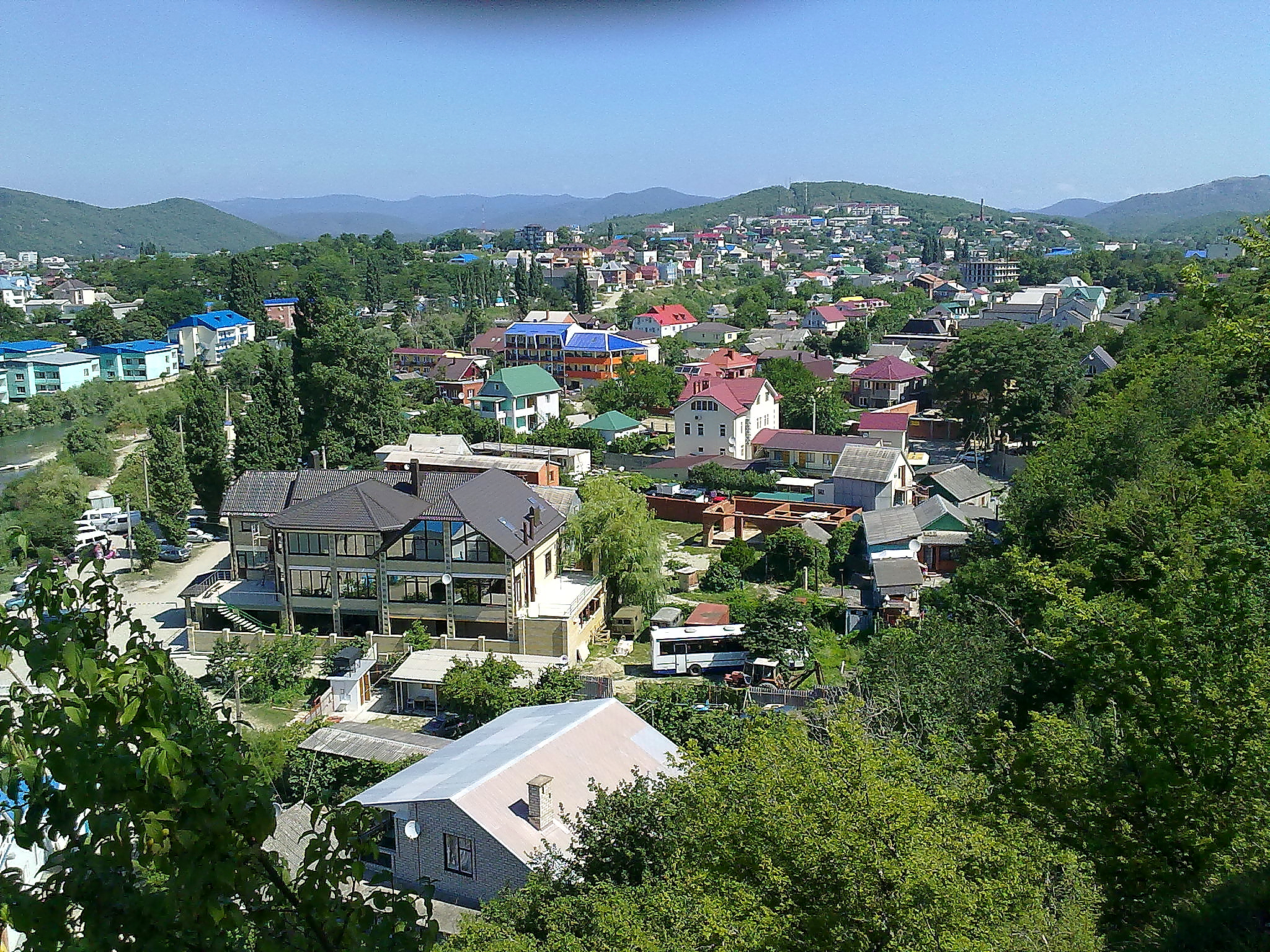

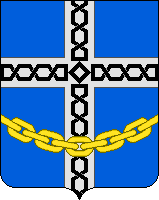
- Coat of arms
- Interactive map of Arkhipo-Osipovka
- Location of Arkhipo-Osipovka Arkhipo-Osipovka (European Russia) Arkhipo-Osipovka (Russia)
- Country: Russia
- Federal subject: Krasnodar Krai
- Founded: 1864
- Elevation: 6 m (20 ft)

Population
  - Estimate (2021): 6,991 )
- Time zone: UTC+3 (MSK)
- Postal code: 353485–353488
- OKTMO ID: 03708000111

Arkhipo-Osipovka (Russian: Архи́по-О́сиповка) is a rural locality (a selo) and resort on the coast of the Black Sea under the jurisdiction of the town of Gelendzhik in Krasnodar Krai, Russia. Arkhipo-Osipovka is located 50 kilometres (31 mi) away from Gelendzhik. It has one of the warmest climates on the Russian coast. Population: 6,991 (2021 census); 7,853 (2010 census); 8,066 (2002 census); 7,242 (1989 Soviet census).

== History ==
The settlement on the shore of the Vulan Bay originated as the Cossack stanitsa of Vulanovskaya (Вулановская) in 1864. Some twenty-five years later, it was renamed after Arkhip Osipov, a Russian soldier who had sacrificed his life to save his comrades-in-arms from the onslaught of the Circassians in 1840. According to the 1926 Soviet census, it had a population of 1,662, of whom 73.0% were Ukrainian and 19.7% were Russian.

Arkhipo-Osipovka had urban-type settlement status until 2004.

On 3 August 2026, a Ukrainian drone came down and exploded on a beach in Arkhipo-Osipovka, killing seven people, including four children, and injuring forty others.

== Sights ==
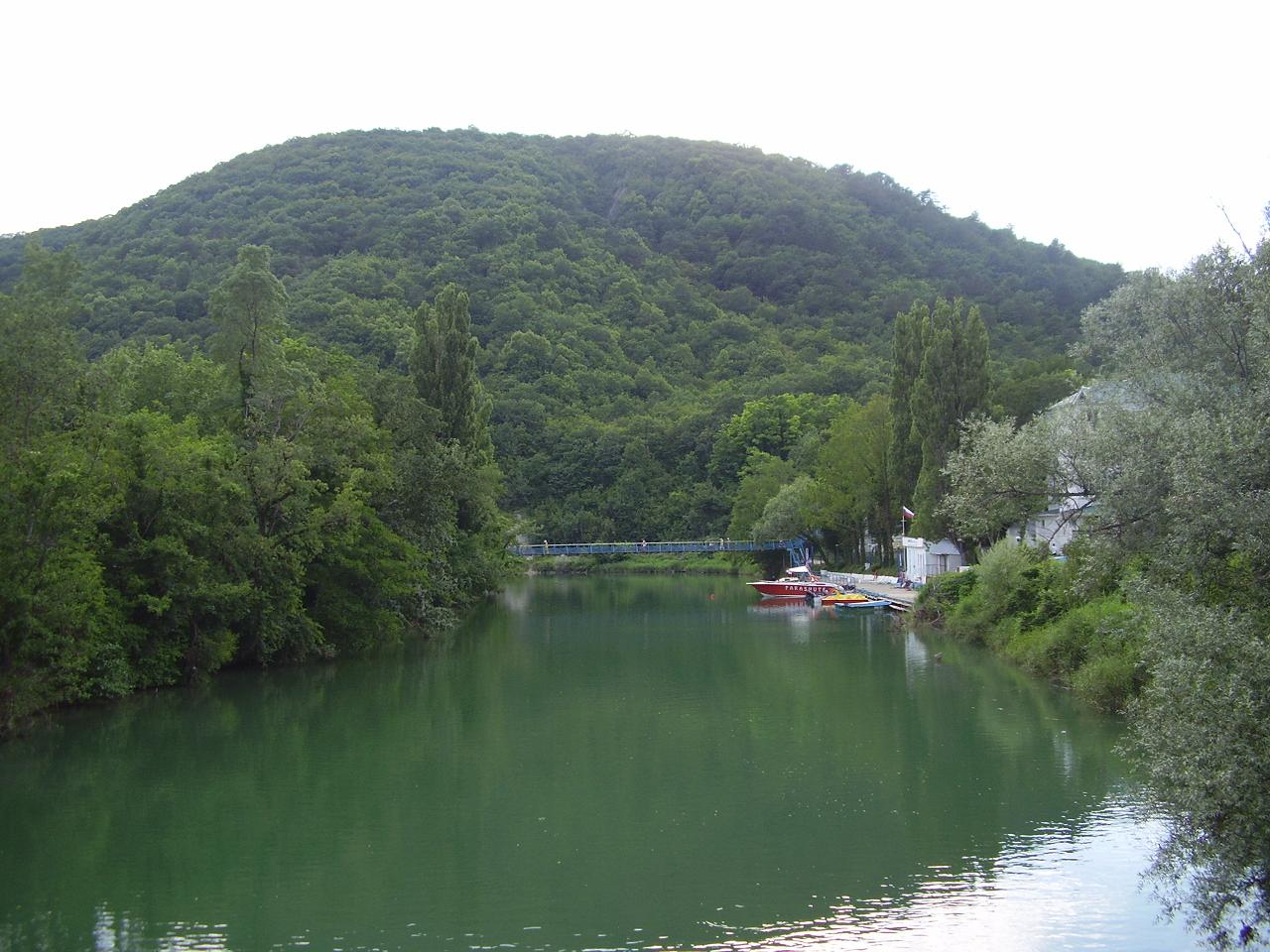
The Vulan River in Arkhipo-Osipovka

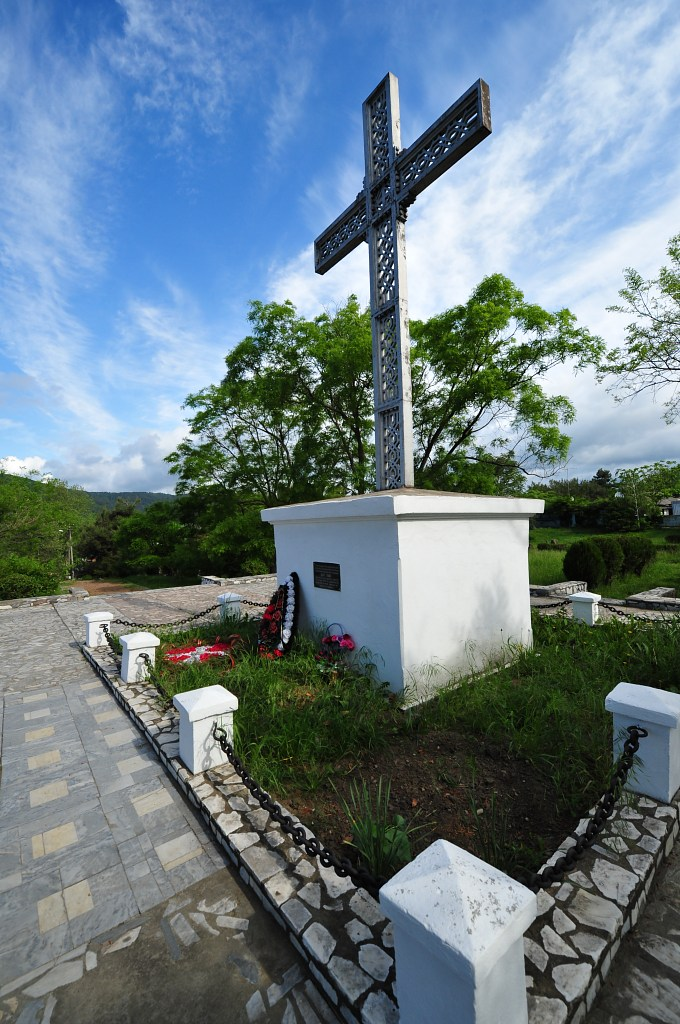
"The Cross" monument to Arkhip Osipov in Arkhipo-Osipovka

The vicinity of Arkhipo-Osipovka contains several waterfalls and the scarce remains of an ancient Roman fortification. The economy is dependent on the Beregovaya compressor station, one of the largest in the world, which is part of the Blue Stream pipeline system which carries natural gas from Russia to Turkey and then to Europe.
