= Trans-Balkan pipeline =

Turkey-Ukraine gas transporter

General information
- Status: in operation

Technical information
- Maximum discharge: 17 to 20 or 25 bcm per year

The Trans-Balkan pipeline is a natural gas pipeline between Turkey and Ukraine with branches to Greece and North Macedonia. It was used by Gazprom for gas deliveries through Balkan countries to Turkey. Before construction of the Blue Stream pipeline it was the only international natural gas pipeline supplying Turkey.

Pipelines of the southern corridor of the natural gas transmission system of Ukraine are connected with the Trans-Balkan pipeline through the Orlivka gas metering and compressor station.

Since 2020, its section in Bulgaria from Malkoçlar on the Turkey–Bulgaria border up to the compressor station in Provadia, north-east of Bulgaria, has been used for transportation of natural gas received from TurkStream. It can also be used in reverse mode to receive Azerbaijani gas via the Trans-Anatolian Pipeline, with a capacity of 17 to 20 or 25 bcm per year. Romania is also a participant in the Trans-Balkan pipeline. In 2022 about 2 bcm from Turkstream was sent to Romania through the Trans-Balkan pipeline. Since 2023 Moldova has received gas through the Iași–Chișinău pipeline. Ukraine has proposed that flow should be permanently south to north.

In August 2026 a drone exploded in the immediate vicinity of the Kardam border crossing between Bulgaria and Romania.
