= Sultanköy =

- Neighbourhood
- Location in Turkey Sultanköy (Marmara)
- Coordinates: 41°01′N 27°59′E
- Country: Turkey
- Province: Tekirdağ
- District: Marmara Ereğlisi
- Elevation: 10 m (33 ft)
- Population (2022): 2,538
- Time zone: UTC+3 (TRT)
- Postal code: 59740
- Area code: 0282

Sultanköy is a neighbourhood of the municipality and district of Marmara Ereğlisi, Tekirdağ Province, Turkey. Its population is 2,538 (2022). Before the 2013 reorganisation, it was a town (belde).

== Geography ==
Sultanköy is a coastal town in Rumeli (Thrace, the European part of Turkey) to the northeast of Marmara Ereğlisi. It is on the state highway D.110 which connects Istanbul to Tekirdağ. The distance to Marmara Ereğlisi is 5 kilometres (3.1 mi) and to Tekirdağ is 48 kilometres (30 mi).

== History ==
Although there was a settlement named Parolionthos around the present town in the ancient age, Sultanköy was founded in the 16th century by the Turkmen people from Iran and was named as Sultanşah. Later the suffix -şah was replaced by -köy. The settlement suffered during the wars in the last years of the Ottoman Empire. It was occupied by the Russians in the Russo-Turkish War (1877–1878), by the Bulgarians in the First Balkan War and by the Greeks after the First World War. In 1999 it was declared a seat of township.

== Economy ==
The industrial site to the north and east of the town is a major source of revenue for the town residents. There is also a natural gas power plant in the town.
