= Etki Liman LNG Facility =

Coordinates: 38°49′15″N 26°55′10″E

Etki Liman LNG Facility is a floating production storage and offloading unit (FPSO) for liquefied natural gas (LNG) in İzmir Province, western Turkey. It is the country's first floating LNG storage facility.

== History ==
The floating LNG storage facility is the vessel MT GDF Suez Neptune, which sailed from France to Turkey and moored at a special pier of Terminal in Aliağa district of İzmir Province on 11 December 2016. The 2009-built Norway-flagged LNG carrier is 283 m (928 ft) long and has a beam of 43 m (141 ft).

== Capacity ==
The facility is capable of storing 145,000 m^{3} (5,100,000 cu ft) LNG. She can regasify LNG delivered from other ships. The floating storage facility went in service as Turkey's first one of its kind on 23 December 2016. It is planned that the annual storage capacity of the Aliağa Terminal, operated by, will be 5.3 million tons. It will increase country's daily natural gas supply capacity from 191,000,000 m^{3} (6.7×10^{9} cu ft) up to 224,000,000 m^{3} (7.9×10^{9} cu ft).

== See also ==
- Lake Tuz Natural Gas Storage,
- Northern Marmara and Değirmenköy (Silivri) Depleted Gas Reservoir,
- Marmara Ereğlisi LNG Storage Facility.
- Botaş Dörtyol LNG Storage Facility
