= Lake Tuz Natural Gas Storage =

Lake Tuz Natural Gas Storage (Turkish: Tuz Gölü Doğalgaz Deposu) is an underground natural gas storage facility under construction in Aksaray Province, central Turkey. It was developed artificially in a salt formation.

The storage facility is situated near Sultanhanı town in Aksaray Province 40 km (25 mi) south of Lake Tuz at a depth of 1,100 to 1,400 m (3,600 to 4,600 ft). It was established by creating salt caverns. The twelve man-made salt caverns each with a volume of 630,000–750,000 m^{3} (22,000,000–26,000,000 cu ft) can hold 1,200,000,000 m^{3} (4.2×10^{10} cu ft) of natural gas. Daily delivery from the storage can be up to 44,000,000 m^{3} (1.6×10^{9} cu ft) when needed.

The geological structure of the area is suitable for large underground natural gas storage facilities. The salt formation covers an area of 30 km^{2} (12 sq mi). It is 15 km (9.3 mi) long and around 2.0–2.5 km (1.2–1.6 mi) thick. It has a salt dome structure. To create the caverns in the salt formation, fresh water was brought by pipeline from Hirfanlı Dam at 120 km (75 mi) distance. Using the process of solution mining, water was injected through a borehole into the salt formation, and the saline water, which is formed after dissolution of salt in water, was pumped back to the surface leaving a void in the formation. The salt water was transported to 40 km (25 mi) far away Lake Tuz by pipeline. Gas pressure inside the storage is nearly 210 bar (21,000 kPa).

The contract for the project was signed between the Turkish BOTAŞ and the Chinese Tianchen Engineering Company (TCC) in 2012, and the construction started in 2013. For the financing, World Bank provided a loan in the amount of US$325 million in 2006. Another loan in the amount of US$400 million was secured in 2014. The first phase of the storage construction completed in February 2017. It is expected that storage will be fully in service in 2021. When completed, the facility will be capable of storing 10% of the natural gas consumed. The planned goal for total capacity is set to 20% of the consumed natural gas. The cost of the development was US$700 million.

The storage ensures supply safety in accordance with hourly, daily and seasonal needs. It eliminates supply demand disparity. Stored natural gas will be withdrawn in times of extreme cold weather or when the water level in the dams is reduced in drought. It also helps price stability.

Currently, the storage is extended as a next project step.

== See also ==
- Northern Marmara and Değirmenköy (Silivri) Depleted Gas Reservoir,
- Marmara Ereğlisi LNG Storage Facility,
- Egegaz Aliağa LNG Storage Facility.
- Botaş Dörtyol LNG Storage Facility
