= Öztaş =

Öztaş may refer to:

- Öztaş, Ömerli, a neighborhood of Ömerli, Mardin Province, Turkey
- Raşit Öztaş (1920 – ????), Turkish athlete
