= Blue Stream =

Trans-Black Sea gas pipeline

- Location of Blue Stream

Location
- Country: Russia, Turkey
- Direction: north–south
- Start: Izobilny gas plant, Stavropol Krai, Russia
- Passes through: Beregovaya compressor station, Black Sea, Durusu terminal
- To: Ankara, Turkey

General information
- Type: natural gas
- Partners: Gazprom, Eni, BOTAŞ
- Operator: Gazprom, Blue Stream Pipeline B.V., BOTAŞ
- Commissioned: 2005

Technical information
- Length: 1,213 km (754 mi)
- Maximum discharge: 16 billion cubic metres per year

Blue Stream is a major trans-Black Sea gas pipeline that carries natural gas to Turkey from Russia. The pipeline was constructed in 2001–02 by the Blue Stream Pipeline B.V., the Netherlands based joint venture of Russian Gazprom and Italian Eni, and began operation in 2003. The Blue Stream Pipeline B.V. is an owner of the subsea section of pipeline, including Beregovaya compressor station, while Gazprom owns and operates the Russian land section of the pipeline and the Turkish land section is owned and operated by the Turkish energy company BOTAŞ. According to Gazprom the pipeline was built with the intent of diversifying Russian gas delivery routes to Turkey and avoiding third countries.

== History ==
Preparations of the pipeline project started in 1997. In 1997, Gazprom and BOTAŞ signed a 25-year gas sale contract. One of the political goals of the Blue Stream project was to block the path of rival countries aiming to use the territory of Turkey to bring gas from the Caspian area to Europe.

The construction of the Russian land section took place in 2001–2002 and the offshore section in 2001–2002. The offshore section of the pipeline was built by Italian constructor Saipem and the Russian onshore section by Stroytransgaz, a subsidiary of Gazprom. The offshore pipe was laid by the pipe-laying vessel Saipem 7000. Gas flows from Russia to Turkey started in February 2003. However, because of the price dispute between Russia and Turkey, the official inauguration ceremony at the Durusu gas metering station took place only on 17 November 2005. Attending the inauguration were Russian President Vladimir Putin, Turkish Prime Minister Recep Tayyip Erdoğan and Italian Prime Minister Silvio Berlusconi.

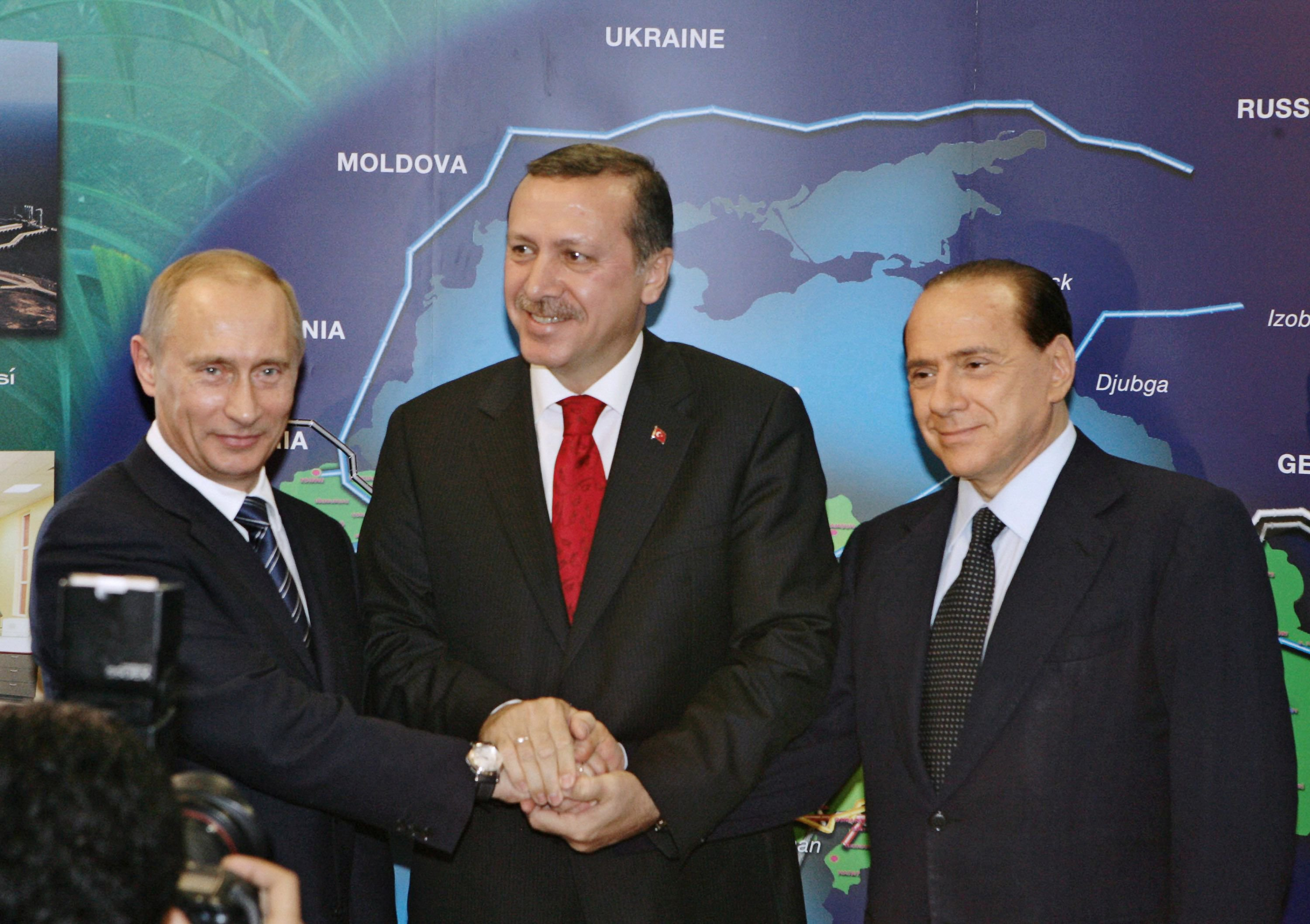
Recep Tayyip Erdoğan, Vladimir Putin and Silvio Berlusconi at the opening of the Blue Stream gas pipeline in November 2005

== Technical features ==
Blue Stream full capacity is 16 billion cubic meters (bcm) of natural gas per year. The total length of the pipeline is 1,213 kilometres (754 mi). Russia's land section is 373 kilometres (232 mi) long from the Izobilnoye gas plant, Stavropol Krai, up to Arkhipo-Osipovka, Krasnodar Krai. The land section consists of the Stavropolskaya and Krasnodarskaya compressor stations. The offshore section is 396 kilometres (246 mi) long laying from the Beregovaya compressor station in Arkhipo-Osipovka to the Durusu terminal locating 60 kilometres (37 mi) from Samsun (Turkey). Turkey's land section is 444 kilometres (276 mi) long up to Ankara.

The pipeline uses pipes with different diameters: mainland section 1,400 millimetres (55 in), mountainous section 1,200 millimetres (47 in) and submarine section 610 millimetres (24 in). The gas pressure in submarine section is 25 MPa (250 atm). Being laid in depths as low as 2.2 kilometres (1.4 mi), it is considered among the deepest subsea pipelines of this diameter.

== Operations ==
Gas from Blue Stream started to flow in February 2003, and the pipeline delivered 1.3 bcm to BOTAŞ in 2003. Gas flows have progressively increased towards the pipeline's capacity of 16 bcm per year. From 2010 to 2014, supplies averaged 14.1 bcm per year, with a high point of 14.7 bcm in 2012.

== Contracts ==
The contract signed in 1997 was for 365 bcm total. A BOTAŞ contract for 5.75 bcm a year expires at the end of 2025, thus all 16 bcm expires end 2025.

== Blue Stream 2 ==
Blue Stream 2 was first proposed in 2002. In 2005, Vladimir Putin and Recep Tayyip Erdoğan discussed building a second line, and an expansion of the Blue Stream by the Samsun-Ceyhan link and by branch to southeast Europe. This second pipeline, and extension of it up through Bulgaria, Serbia and Croatia to western Hungary was suggested after five countries planned to construct the Nabucco Pipeline from Turkey to Central and Western Europe. However, this expansion was replaced by the South Stream project, which proposed laying subsea pipeline directly from Russia to Bulgaria, which in turn was later replaced by TurkStream. In 2009, Russian prime minister Putin proposed a line parallel to Blue Stream 1 under the Black Sea, and further from Samsun to Ceyhan. From Ceyhan natural gas would have been transported to Syria, Lebanon, Israel, and Cyprus. The export to Israel would have been through the proposed Ceyhan-Ashkelon subsea pipeline.

== See also ==
- TurkStream
- South Stream
- Nabucco Pipeline
- Trans-Caspian Gas Pipeline
- South Caucasus Pipeline
