= Northern Marmara and Değirmenköy (Silivri) Depleted Gas Reservoir =

Natural gas storages in Istanbul, Turkey

Northern Marmara and Değirmenköy (Silivri) Depleted Gas Reservoir (Turkish: Kuzey Marmara ve Değirmenköy Sahaları Yeraltı Doğalgaz Depolama Tesisleri) are underground natural gas storages inside depleted gas fields in Istanbul Province, northwestern Turkey. Combined, it is the country's first underground natural gas storage facility.

One of the storage facilities is situated inside a depleted gas field undersea in northern Marmara Sea and the other is in neighboring Değirmenköy, a town in Silivri district of Istanbul Province. Both sites were suitable due to their proximity to Istanbul and to the gas pipeline of BOTAŞ.

== Northern Marmara Gas Field ==
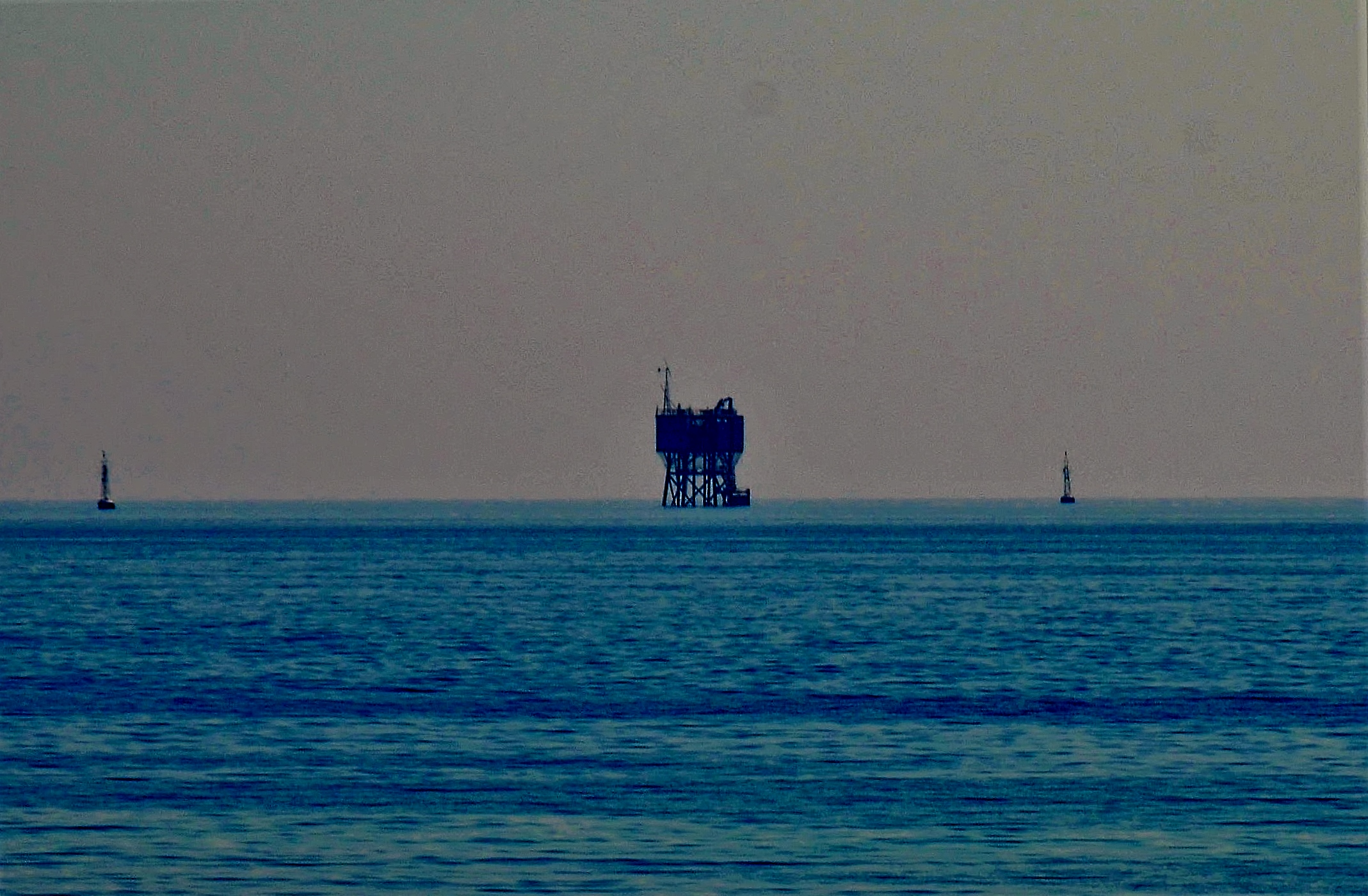
Silivri offshore platform.

The Northern Marmara Gas Field was discovered in 1988 in an area 5 km (3.1 mi) west of Silivri and 2.5 km (1.6 mi) far off the coast at a depth of 1,200 m (3,900 ft). To determine the size of the natural gas reserve, which is the first undersea natural gas reserve in Turkey, three offshore boreholes in 1995 and two more were drilled in 1996. Natural gas production started in September 1997 at the five gas wells. Gas was pumped from an offshore platform by a 3 km (1.9 mi)-long undersea pipeline to the plant at the coast for processing. Between 2003 and 2004, six directional wells were drilled, which had vertical depths of 1,200–1,250 m (3,940–4,100 ft) and horizontal deviation of 2,287–2,947 m (7,503–9,669 ft).

== Değirmenköy Natural Gas Field ==
Değirmenköy Natural Gas Field is located 19 km (12 mi) west of Silivri. The field was discovered in 1994, and the production started in 1995 from nine wells, seven of which were directional. The gas processing facility was built by a consortium of German Lurgi AG and Turkish Fernas Construction Ltd.

== Depleted gas reservoirs ==
The storage facilities of Northern Marmara and Değirmenköy were projected by the Turkish Petroleum Corporation (TPAO) in 1996. The depleted gas reservoirs went into service in July 2007. The Northern Marmara Reservoir is connected to the main processing plant of BOTAŞ by a 3.5 km (2.2 mi)-long pipeline and the Değirmenköy Reservoir by a 13 km (8.1 mi)-long pipeline.

The storage capacity of the Northern Marmara Reservoir is 1,600,000,000 m^{3} (5.7×10^{10} cu ft) and of the Değirmenköy Reservoir is 300,000,000 m^{3} (1.1×10^{10} cu ft). While the maximum daily gas injection capacity is 11,800,000 m^{3} (420,000,000 cu ft), the maximum withdrawal capacity per day is 15,000,000 m^{3} (530,000,000 cu ft).

== Capacity expansion ==
The entire natural gas storage project is planned in three phases. The second phase involves the capacity expansion for the Değirmenköy facility, and the third phase for the Northern Marmara facility. The second phase expansion project, which is scheduled to be completed in 2020, provides increasing of the daily injection capacity up to 29,000,000 m^{3} (1.0×10^{9} cu ft) and the maximum daily withdrawal capacity to 50,000,000 m^{3} (1.8×10^{9} cu ft). It is planned that the total storage capacity will be 4,290,000,000 m^{3} (1.51×10^{11} cu ft), the daily injection capacity 40,000,000 m^{3} (1.4×10^{9} cu ft) and the daily withdrawal capacity 75,000,000 m^{3} (2.6×10^{9} cu ft) after completion of the third phase.

== See also ==
- Lake Tuz Natural Gas Storage
- Marmara Ereğlisi LNG Storage Facility
- Egegaz Aliağa LNG Storage Facility
- Botaş Dörtyol LNG Storage Facility
