= Sakarya gas field =

Natural gas field in the Black Sea

- Location within Black Sea
- Country: Turkey
- Location: Black Sea
- Offshore/onshore: offshore
- Coordinates: 42.69859°N 31.17920°E

Field history
- Discovery: 21.08.2020
- Start of production: 20.04.2023

Production
- Estimated gas in place: 540×10^{9} m^{3} (19×10^{12} cu ft)

Sakarya Gas Field is a natural gas field of sweet gas in the Black Sea, which feeds the Filyos Natural-gas Processing Plant. In October 2023 it produced 4 million cubic metres a day, and aimed to increase to 10. Saipem has a contract.
