= MT GDF Suez Neptune =

History

Norway
- Name: GDF Suez Neptune
- Namesake: GDF Suez, Neptune
- Owner: Engie (formerly GDF Suez)
- Operator: Leif Höegh & Co
- Builder: Samsung Heavy Industries
- Cost: US$290 million
- Launched: 20 September 2008
- In service: 2009
- Identification: IMO number: 9385673; MMSI number: 257356000; Callsign: LADV7

General characteristics
- Type: floating storage and regasification unit (FSRU)
- Tonnage: 96,153 GT; 80,986 DWT
- Length: 283.06 m (928 ft 8 in)
- Beam: 43.40 m (142 ft 5 in)
- Draft: 11.40 m (37 ft 5 in)
- Installed power: 3 x Wärtsilä 12V50DF + 1 x Wärtsilä 6L50D
- Propulsion: 2 x ABB 13,200 kW
- Speed: 19.5 knots (36.1 km/h; 22.4 mph)
- Capacity: 145,130 m^{3} (5,125,000 cu ft)

MT GDF Suez Neptune is a liquefied natural gas (LNG) carrier, which has been used as a floating storage and regasification unit (FSRU) for LNG at the Aliaga Etki LNG terminal in Aliağa district of İzmir Province, western Turkey between 2016 and 2019.

== Characteristics ==
She was built by Samsung Heavy Industries in South Korea costing US$290 million. The vessel is owned by French multinational electric utility company GDF Suez. She was delivered to the Norwegian operator Leif Höegh & Co on November 30, 2009. The vessel is 283.06 m (928 ft 8 in) long, has a beam of 43.40 m (142 ft 5 in) and a draft of 11.40 m (37 ft 5 in). At 80,986 DWT, she has a service speed of 19.5 knots (36.1 km/h; 22.4 mph). The vessel is powered by four Wärtsilä dual-fuel-electric LNG engines of Finland, which drive fully integrated four ABB generators from Sweden.

The vessel has a storage capacity of 145,130 m^{3} (5,125,000 cu ft). Compared to standard LNG carriers, she has additional features such as three Wärtsilä-Hamworthy supplied regasification units mounted on skids, discharging arrangements, as well as special equipment for reducing emission to air and water. The hourly capacity of regasification is 210 tons at a send-out pressure of 115 bar (11,500 kPa). This allows to employ the vessel as a FSRU.

== FSRU for Etki LNG terminal ==
The vessel sailed to Turkey after loading a full cargo at Montoir LNG Terminal in France, and took position at a special pier of Etki LNG terminal in Aliağa district of İzmir Province on December 11, 2016. French Engie (formerly GDF Suez) and Turkish construction companies Kolin and Kalyon inaugurated the Etki LNG terminal in Aliağa, where the FSRU went in service as Turkey's first floating liquified natural gas storage and regasification facility on December 23, 2016. In April 2019, she was replaced by FSRU Turquoise.
