= Marmara Ereğlisi LNG Storage Facility =

Coordinates: 40.99350°N 27.97952°E

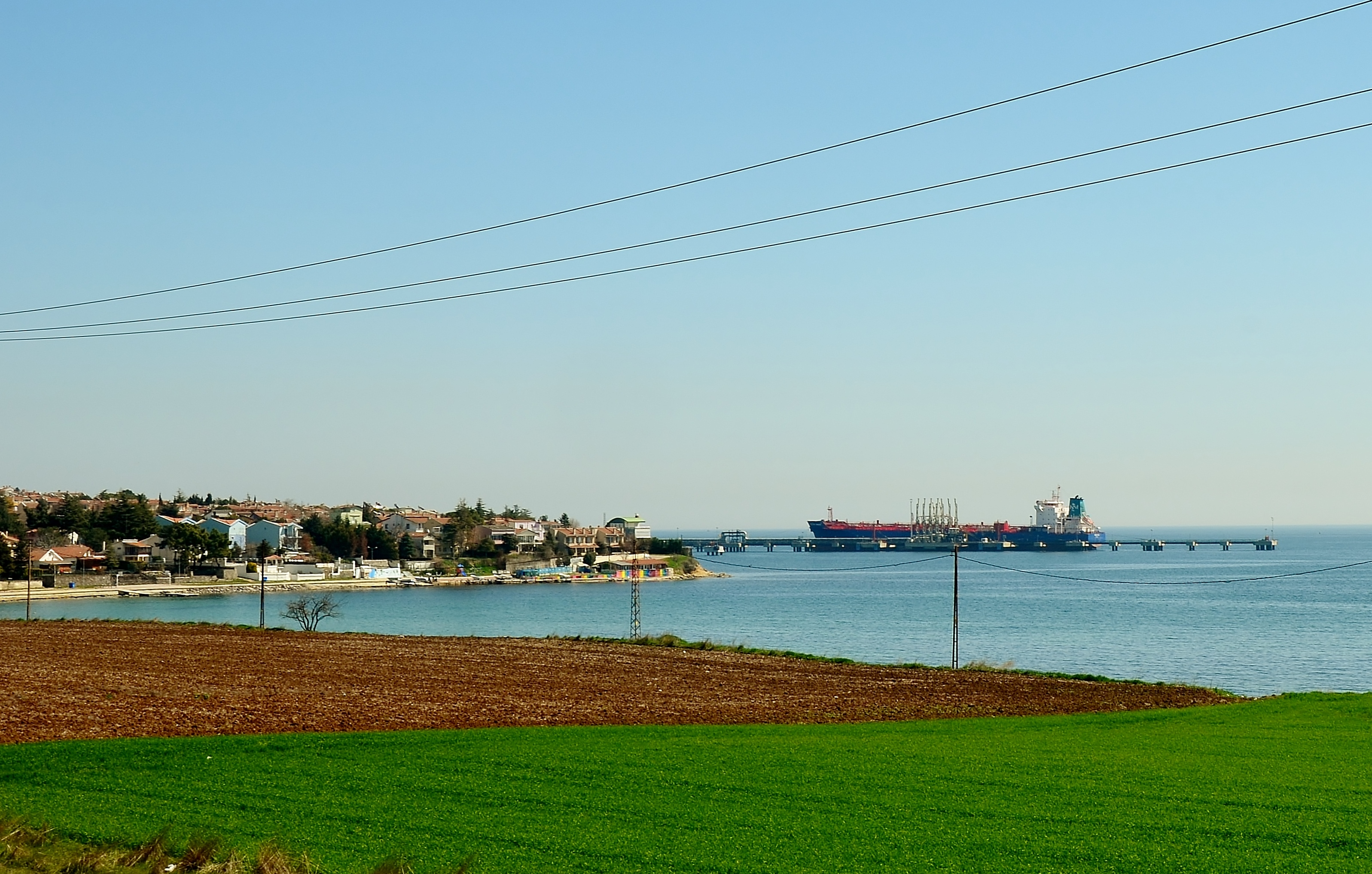
Marmara Ereğlisi LNG Storage Facility's pier with a tank vessel.

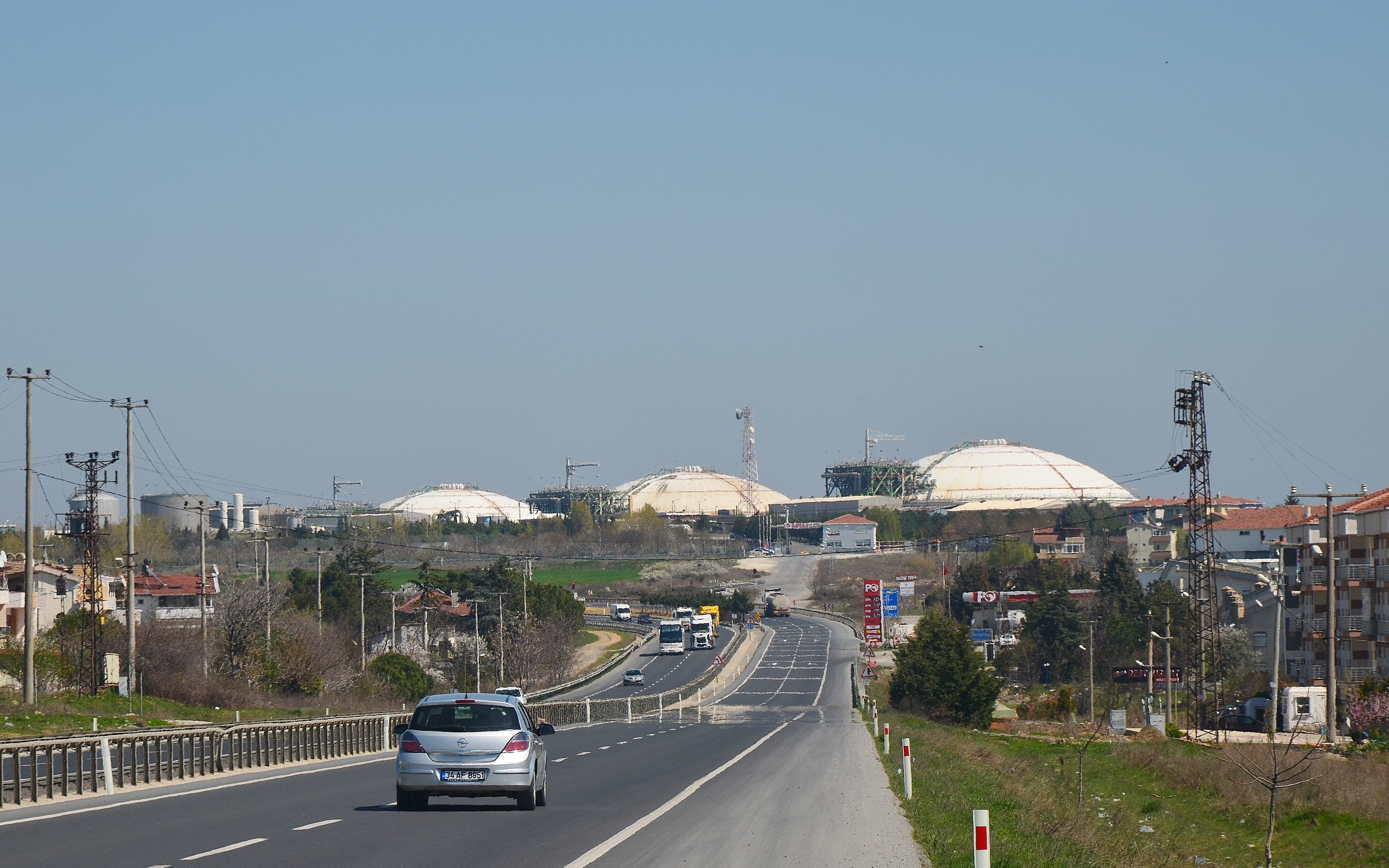
Marmara Ereğlisi LNG Storage Facility's tanks seen from the state highway D-110.

Marmara Ereğlisi LNG Storage Facility (Turkish: Marmara Ereğlisi LNG Terminali) is an above-ground liquefied natural gas (LNG) tanks facility in Tekirdağ Province, northwestern Turkey.

The LNG storage facility is located in Marmara Ereğlisi, 35 km (22 mi) east of Tekirdağ and 95 km (59 mi) west of Istanbul. It is part of an LNG terminal operated by the state-owned natural gas distributor BOTAŞ, where LNG carriers at a discharge port pump the imported cargo ashore. LNG is stored in tanks and regasified to convey to the main pipeline system as needed.

The project for the construction of the LNG storage facility was launched in 1984. The facility went into service in August 1994. In 2007, six filling platforms were added for tank trucks having 20–50 m^{3} (710–1,770 cu ft) capacity. Three filling platforms are able to fill up daily 75 tanker trucks.

With the completion of an additional fourth storage tank in 2019, the country's LNG storage capacity will increase by 30%. The expansion will increase the total storage capacity of the facility about 50% up to 27,000,000 m^{3} (950,000,000 cu ft) with extra 9,000,000 m^{3} (320,000,000 cu ft).

== See also ==
- Lake Tuz Natural Gas Storage,
- Northern Marmara and Değirmenköy (Silivri) Depleted Gas Reservoir,
- Egegaz Aliağa LNG Storage Facility.
- Botaş Dörtyol LNG Storage Facility
