= South Akcakoca Sub-Basin gas field =

Turkish gas field in the Black Sea

The South Akcakoca Sub-Basin (SASB) is a gas field in the Turkish part of the Black Sea.
