= BOTAŞ =

Turkish energy company

BOTAŞ Petroleum Pipeline Corporation
- Type: State-owned
- Industry: Energy
- Founded: 1974
- Founder: Türkiye Petrolleri Anonim Ortaklığı
- Headquarters: Ankara, Turkey
- Key people: Abdulvahit Fidan (Chairman of the Board of Directors and General Manager)
- Services: Oil and Natural Gas Transmission, Natural Gas Storage, Natural Gas Trade
- Owner: Turkey Wealth Fund
- Divisions: Natural Gas Operations District Management, Petroleum Operations District Management, Dörtyol Operation Management, LNG Operation Management
- Website: www.botas.gov.tr

BOTAŞ Petroleum Pipeline Corporation (BOTAŞ) is the state-owned crude oil and gas pipelines and trading company in Turkey. The company was established in 1974 as a subsidiary of TPAO. Since 1995, BOTAŞ is a wholly state-owned company.

== History ==
BOTAŞ was originally established in 1974 for the construction and operation of the Kirkuk–Ceyhan Oil Pipeline. Since 1987, BOTAŞ has also been involved in the natural gas transportation and trade activities. From February 9, 1990, until May 2, 2001, BOTAŞ had monopoly rights on natural gas import, distribution, sales and pricing. In practice, the gas distribution monopoly of BOTAŞ ended only in 2007, when Royal Dutch Shell and Bosphorus Gaz, a joint venture of Gazprom and Tur Enerji, started to sell natural gas in the market.

== Pipeline operations ==
In addition to the Kirkuk–Ceyhan Oil Pipeline, BOTAŞ owns and operates Ceyhan–Kırıkkale, Batman–Dörtyol, and Şelmo–Batman crude oil pipelines. It also owns and operates the national gas grid of Turkey with total length of 4,500 kilometres (2,800 mi), and Marmara Ereğlisi Liquefied Natural Gas (LNG) Import Terminal. Internationally, BOTAŞ participates in the Baku–Tbilisi–Ceyhan pipeline, Arab Gas Pipeline section between Syria and Turkey, and Turkey–Greece gas pipeline. It was also a partner in the Nabucco Pipeline project.

== Finance ==
Energy analysts think that imports from Azerbaijan are being bought at a discounted spot price until 2024. In 2019 BOTAŞ made an operating loss of 2 million 3 hundred thousand lira for each of its 2700 employees. The company is on the Global Oil & Gas Exit List.

== Fleet ==
Name	Built by	Type	Acquired	Note
Ertuğrul Gazi	(South Korea) Hyundai Heavy Industries	Floating Storage Regasification Unit (FSRU)	2021	
VASANT-1	(South Korea) Hyundai Heavy Industries	Floating Storage Regasification Unit (FSRU)	2021	Leased
-	(Turkey) ASFAT	Marine Cleaning and Oil Collection Vessel		On order.
Sultanhanı	(Turkey) UZMAR Shipyard	Tugboat	2025	
Silivri	(Turkey) UZMAR Shipyard	Tugboat	2025	

== See also ==
- Marmara Ereğlisi LNG Storage Facility
- Northern Marmara and Değirmenköy (Silivri) Depleted Gas Reservoir
- Lake Tuz Natural Gas Storage
- Botaş Dörtyol LNG Storage Facility
- Botaş Saros FSRU Terminal, under construction as of 2022
- MT Botaş FSRU Ertuğrul Gazi
