= Luciu =

- Commune
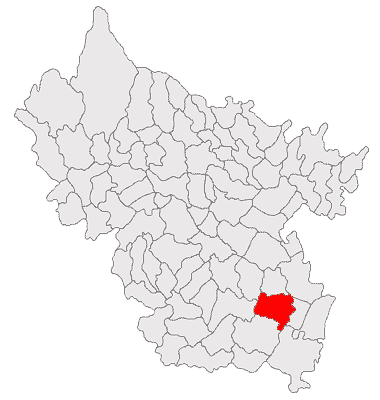
- Location in Buzău County

- Location in Romania
- Coordinates: 44°58′10″N 27°4′45″E
- Country: Romania
- County: Buzău
- Established: 54
- Subdivisions: Caragele, Luciu

Government
  - Mayor (2020–2024): Mircea Frățilă (PSD)
- Area: 83.74 km^{2} (32.33 sq mi)
- Population (2021-12-01): 2,591
  - Density: 30.94/km^{2} (80.14/sq mi)
- Time zone: EET/EEST (UTC+2/+3)
- Postal code: 127315
- Area code: +(40) 238
- Vehicle reg.: BZ
- Website: www.primaria-luciu.ro

Luciu is a commune in Buzău County, Muntenia, Romania. It is composed of two villages, Caragele and Luciu.

The Caragele gas field (with the largest onshore gas reserves in Romania) is located on the administrative territory of the commune.

Historical population
Year	Pop.	±%
2002	2,977	—
2011	2,911	−2.2%
2021	2,591	−11.0%
Source: Census data
