= List of caravanserais =

A caravanserai was a roadside inn where caravans and travelers could rest overnight.

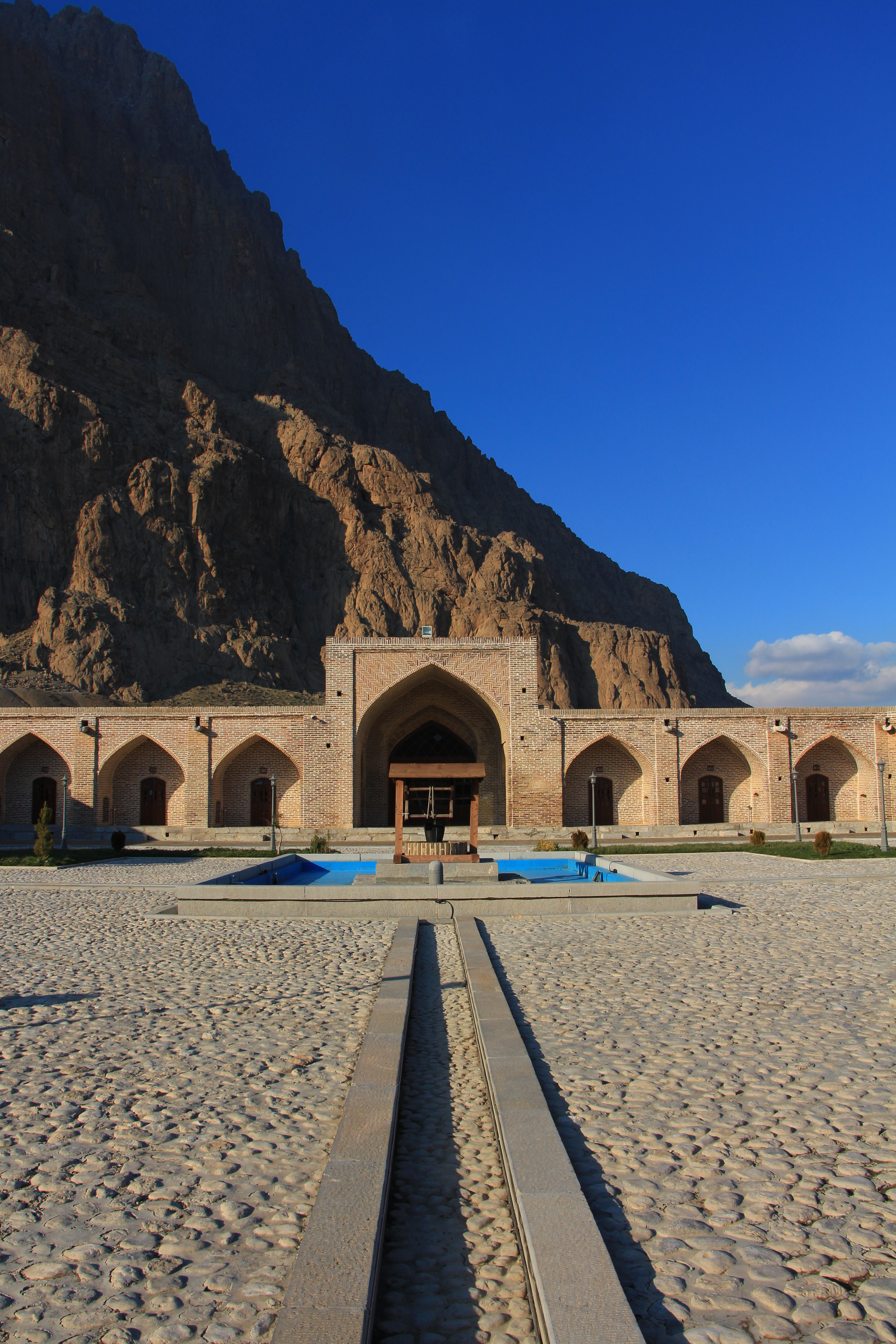
Shah Abbasi Caravansarai, Bisotun, Iran

Caravanserais are typically constructed around a central courtyard, can be used as markets and are found from North Africa and the Aegean to India and Western China; although the majority are found between Iran and Turkey. Hundreds of these structures were built over the centuries.

The following is a partial list in 22 nations:

== Albania ==
- Elbasan Inn, Korçë, Albania

== Armenia ==
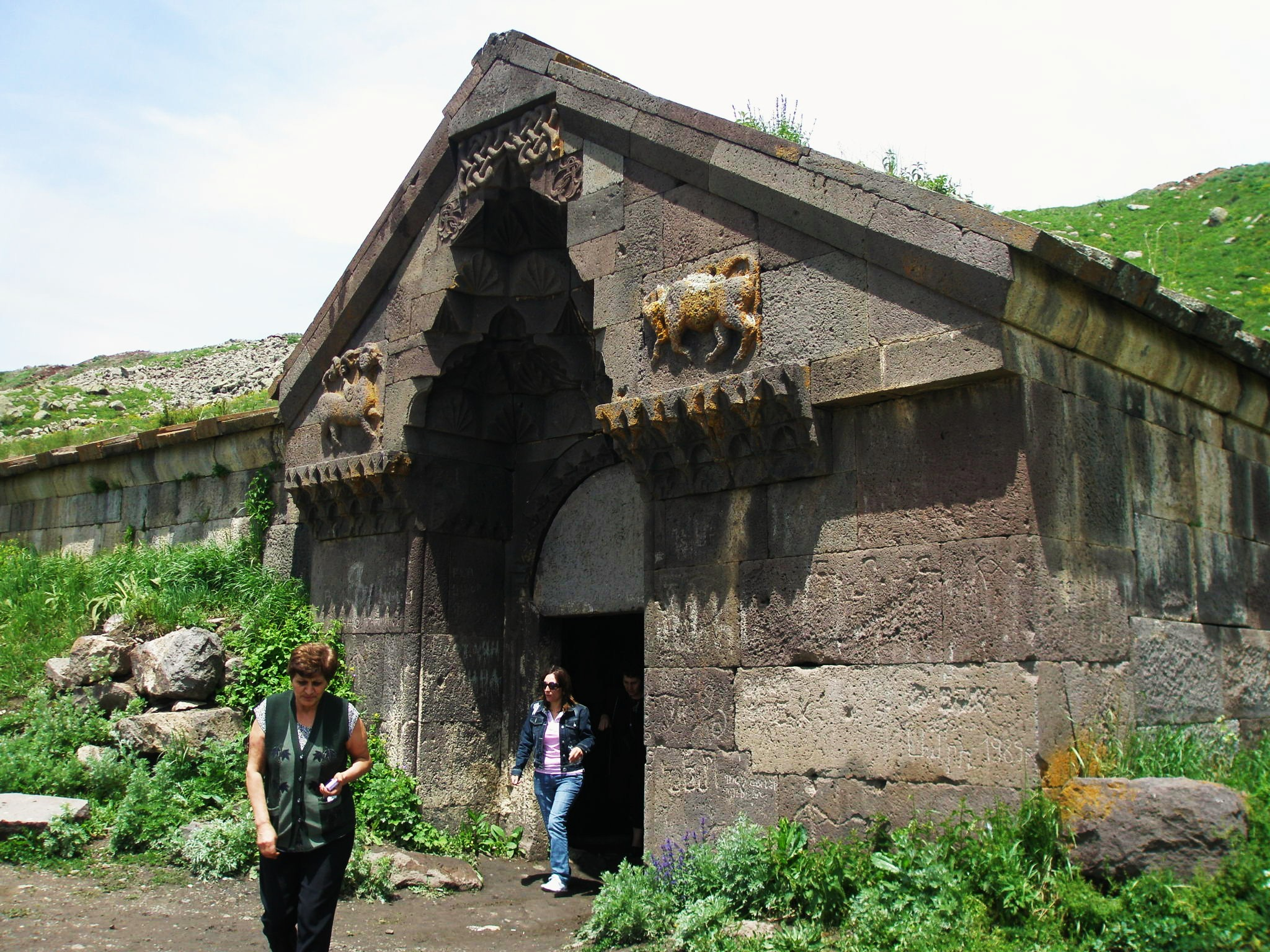
Orbelian's Caravanserai, Armenia

- Orbelian's Caravanserai, Vayots Dzor Province
- Aruch Caravansarai, Aragatsotn Province
- Talin Caravansarai, Aragatsotn Province
- Jrapi Caravansarai, Shirak Province

== Azerbaijan ==
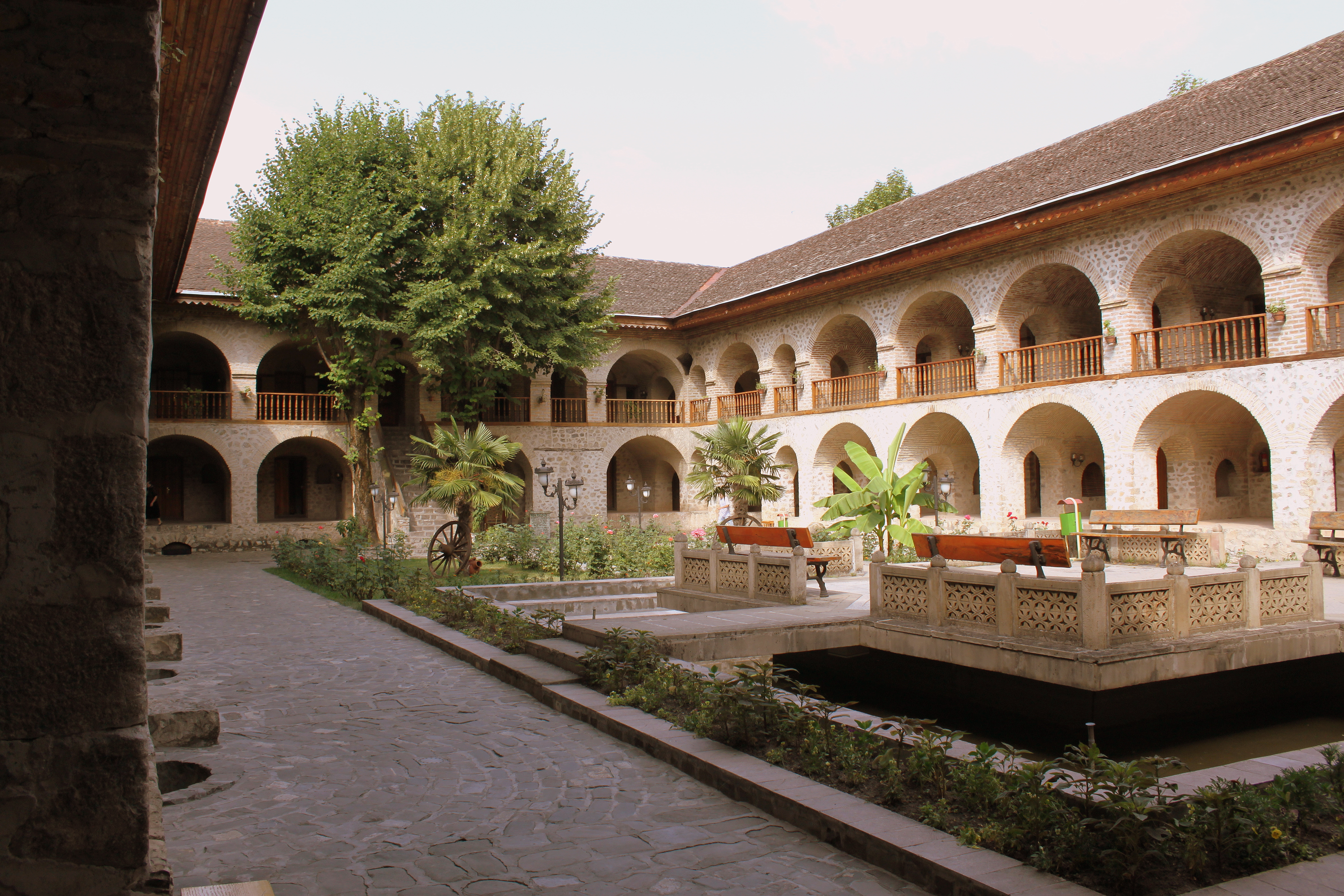
Shaki Caravanserai in Shaki, Azerbaijan

- Caravanserai of Agha Gahraman Mirsiyab
- Ashaghy caravanserai, Shaki
- Bukhara Caravanserai
- Garghabazar Caravanserai
- Khanlig Mukhtar caravanserai
- Multani Caravanserai, Baku
- Sangachal caravanserai
- Shah Abbasi Caravanserai, Ganja
- Shah Sefi's Caravanserai
- Shaki Caravanserai, Shaki
- Small Caravanserai
- Two-Storeyed Caravanserai
- Two-Storeyed Caravanserai (Shusha)
- Upper Caravanserai (Shaki)

== Bangladesh ==
- Bara Katra, Dhaka
- Chhota Katra, Dhaka

== Bosnia and Herzegovina ==
- Morića Han, Sarajevo

== Cyprus ==
- Büyük Han, Nicosia
- Kumarcilar Han, Nicosia

== Egypt ==
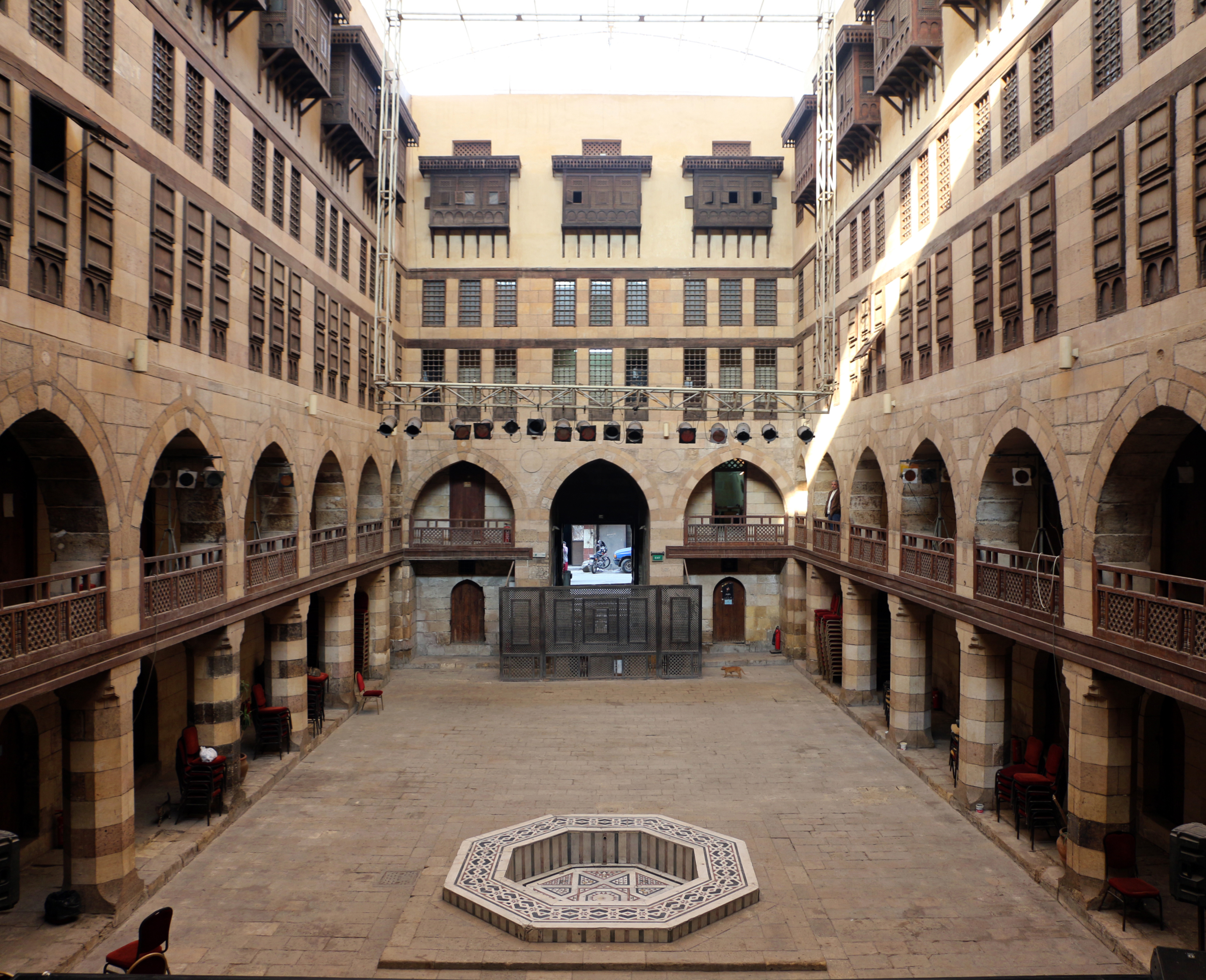
Wikala of al-Ghuri, Cairo, Egypt

- Wikala of al-Ghuri, Cairo
- Wikala of Nafisa al-Bayda, Cairo
- Wikala of Sultan Qaytbay (Bab al-Nasr), Cairo
- Wikala and Sabil-Kuttab of Sultan Qaytbay (al-Azhar), Cairo
- Wikala Bazar'a, (al-Azhar) Cairo

== Greece ==
- Evrenos Bey Han

== India ==
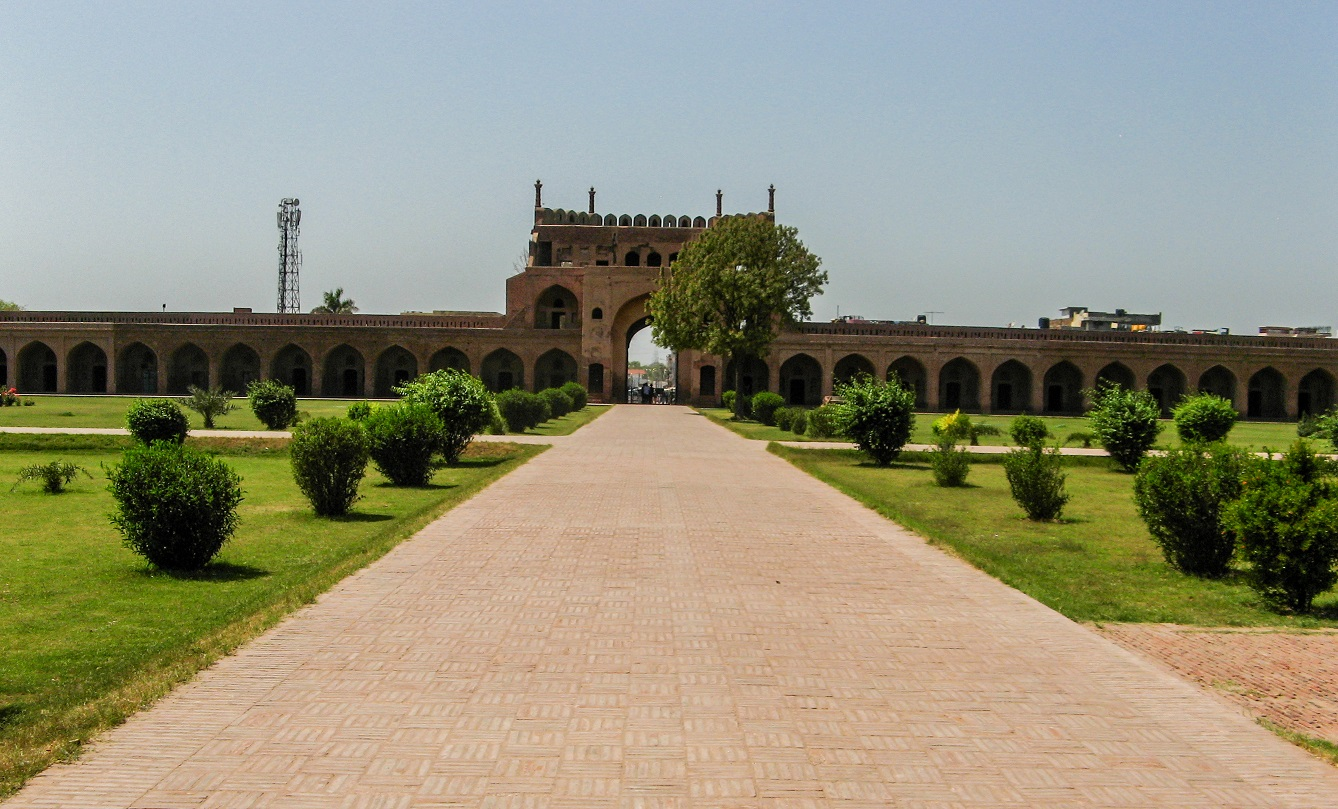
Serai Nurmahal, India

- Arab Serai
- Begu Sarai
- DalSingh Sarai
- Katri Sarai
- Laheria Sarai
- Lakhi Sarai
- Mughal Serai
- Mughal Serai, Doraha
- Mughal Sarai, Surat
- Nampally Sarai
- Purab Sarai
- Sarai Amanat Khan
- Sarai Kale Khan
- Serai Lashkari Khan
- Serai Nurmahal
- Shaikpet Sarai
- Taramati Baradari
- Dakhni Sarai

== Iran ==
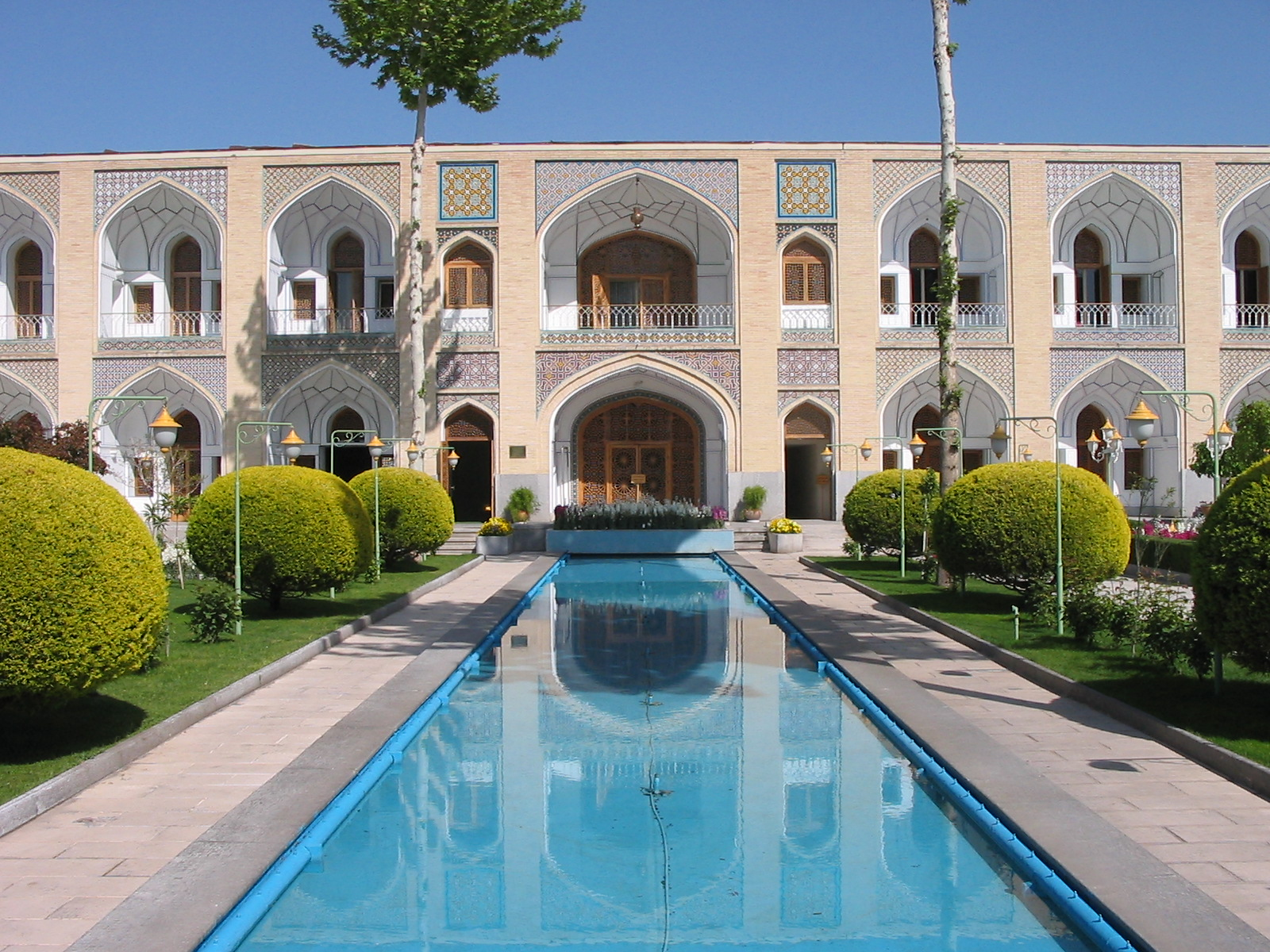
Abbasi Hotel in Isfahan, converted from a former caravanserai, Iran

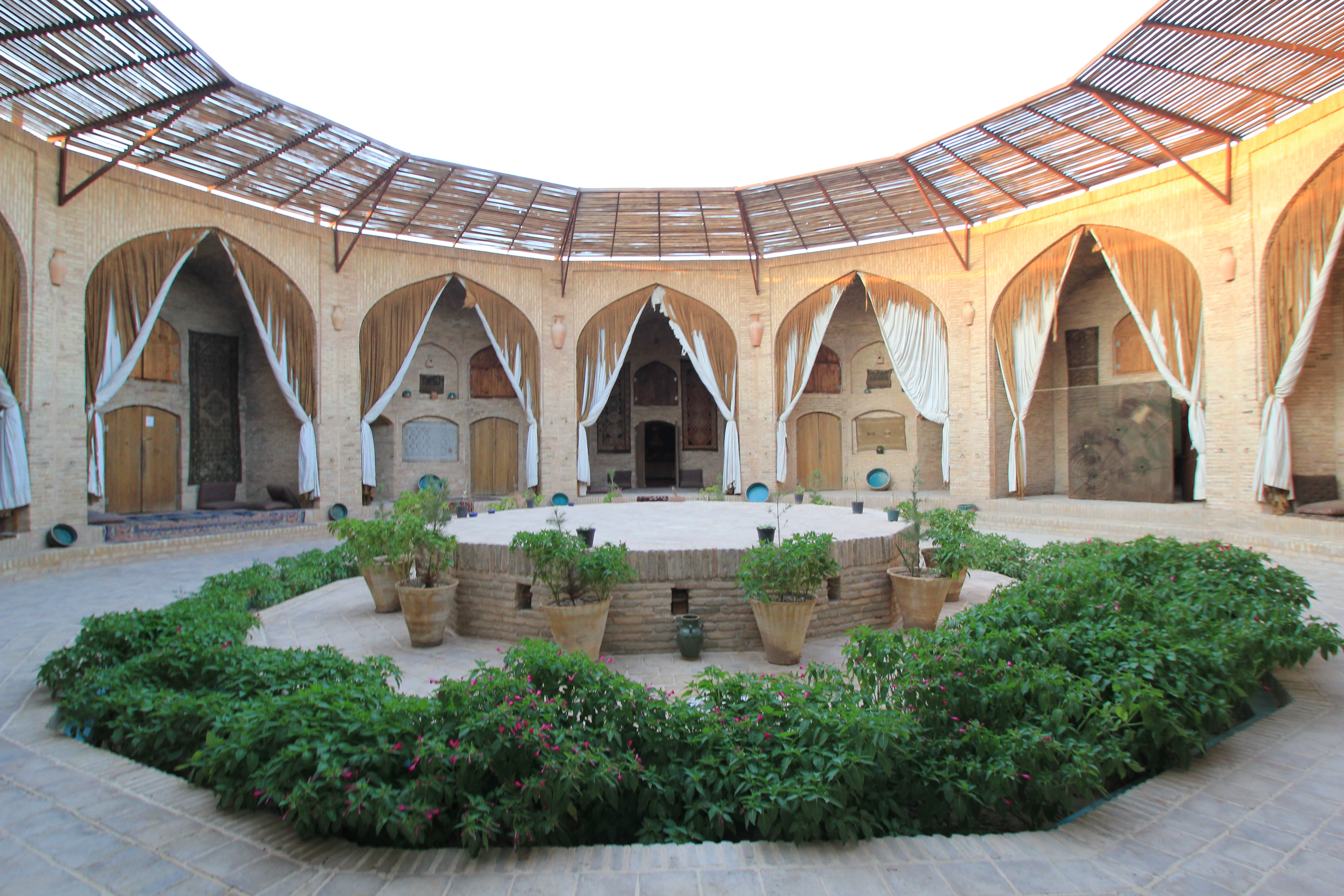
Ribat of Zein-o-din in Yazd

- Amin od-Dowleh Caravansarai, Kashan
- Amin al-tojar Caravansarai, Kashmar
- Amir Chakhmaq Complex, Yazd
- Baba Ghodrat Caravansarai, Mashhad
- Borazjan Castle, Dashtestan County
- Dayr-e Gachin , Qom
- Ganjali Khan Complex, Kerman
- Gaz Caravanserai, Borkhar County
- Izadkhast Caravanserai, Izadkhast
- Jamalabad Caravanserai, Jamalabad
- Khajeh Nazar Caravansarai, Jolfa County
- Madar-e Shah Caravanserai (today's Abbasi Hotel), Isfahan
- Maranjab Caravansarai, Aran and Bidgol
- Mehr Caravanserai, Mehr
- Ribat-i Sharaf, Sarakhs
- Ribat of Zein-o-din, Yazd province
- Sa'd al-Saltaneh Caravanserai, Qazvin
- Sa'in Caravanserai, Nir County
- Sarayan Caravanserai, Sarayan
- Shah Abbasi Caravansarai, Bisotun
- Shah Abbasi Caravanserai, Farsafaj
- Shah Abbasi Caravanserai, Karaj
- Shah Abbasi Caravanserai, Nishapur
- Shah Abbasi Caravanserai, Ray
- Titi Caravanserai, Siahkal County
- Yengi Emam Caravansari, Yengi Emam
- Zafaraniyeh Caravanserai, Zafaraniyeh

== Iraq ==
- Khan al-Gumruk, Mosul
- Khan al-Rubu', Karbala
- Khan Murjan, Baghdad

== Kazakhstan ==
- Kulish Caravanserai
- Ushkan Caravanserai

== Kyrgyzstan ==
- Tash Rabat

== North Macedonia ==
- Kapan Han, Skopje
- Suli An, Skopje
- Kuršumli An, Skopje

== Lebanon ==
- Khan al-'Askar, Tripoli
- Khan al-Franj, Tripoli
- Khan al-Sabun, Tripoli

== Morocco ==
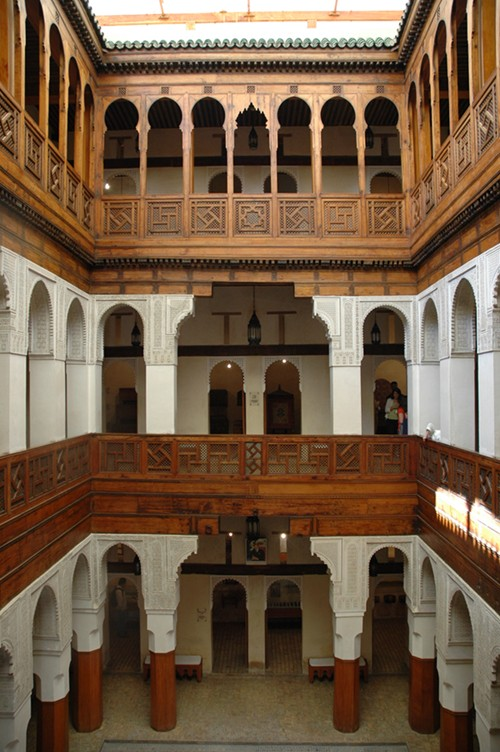
Funduq al-Najjarin in Fes, Morocco

- Funduq Kettanin, Fes
- Funduq al-Najjarin (Fondouk Nejjarine), Fes
- Funduq Sagha, Fes
- Funduq Shamma'in & Funduq Sbitriyyin, Fes
- Funduq al-Tetwaniyyin (Funduq al-Staouniyine), Fes

== Pakistan ==
- Akbari Sarai, Lahore
- Pakka Sarai, Gujar Khan
- Rawat Sarai, Rawat
- Begum Ki Sarai, Attock
- Gorkhatri Sarai, Peshawar

== Palestine and Israel ==
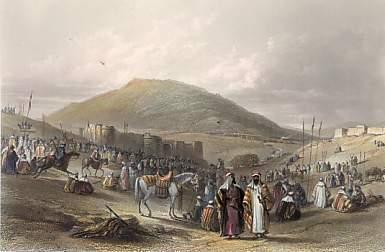
Fair at Khan al-Tujjar, Palestine, c. 1850

Alphabetically, without taking article into consideration (el-, al-, etc.).

- Arab Suqrir, Israel
- Barquq Castle, Gaza Strip, Palestine (also known as Younis al-Nuruzi Caravansari and Khan Younis)
- Caravanserai at Daughters of Jacob Bridge (Gesher Bnot Ya'akov/Jisr Benat Ya'kub): ruins of Mamluk khan; Israel
- Caravanserai at Jisr el-Majami (Old Gesher): Mamluk khan; Israel
- Jubb Yussef (Joseph's Well)
- Khan al-Lubban between al-Lubban ash-Sharqiya and Sinjil, West Bank, Palestine
- Khan al-Tujjar (Mount Tabor), Israel
- Khan al-Tujjar (Nablus), West Bank, Palestine
- Khan al-Umdan, Acre, Israel
- Khirbat al-Minya: Umayyad qasr reused as a khan; Israel
- Monastery of Euthymius, known in Arabic as Khan el-Ahmar; West Bank, Palestine

== Romania ==
- Hanul lui Manuc, Bucharest
- Hanul Gabroveni, Bucharest

== Serbia ==
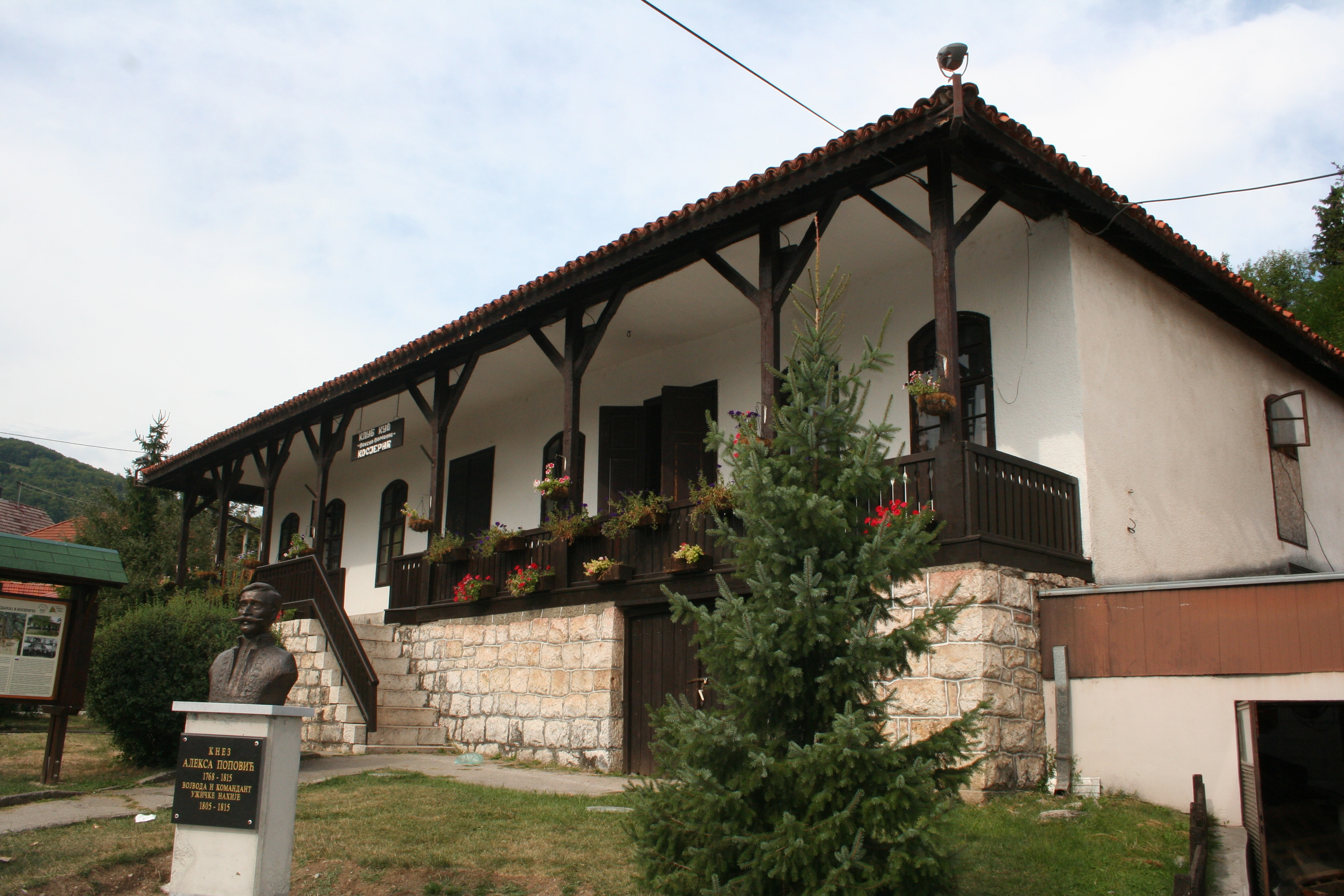
Stari Han in Kosjerić, Serbia

- Stari Han, Kremna, Užice
- Stari Han, Kosjerić
- Ram Caravanserai, Ram

== Spain ==
- Corral del Carbón

== Syria ==
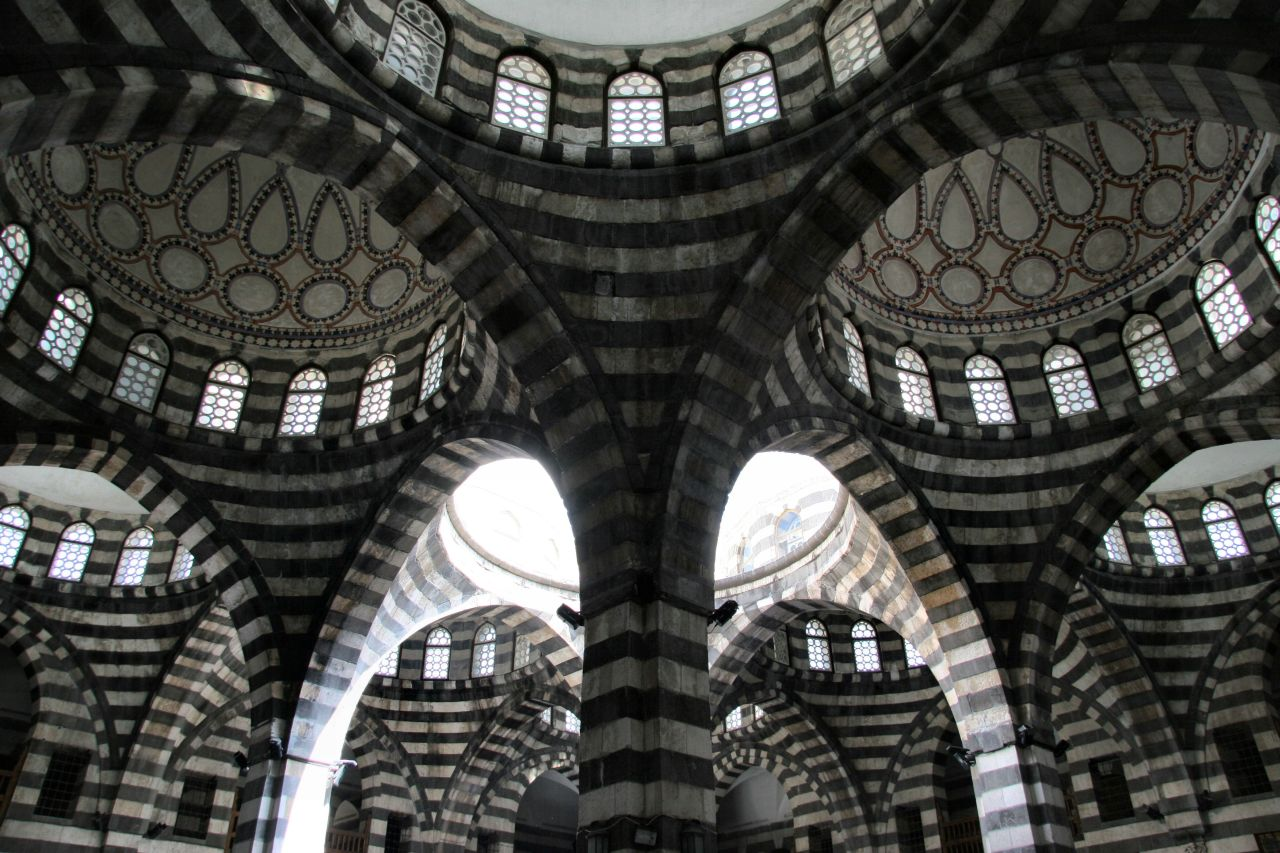
Khan As'ad Pasha in Damascus, Syria

- Khan Tuman
- Khan As'ad Pasha, Damascus
- Khan al-Farrayin, Aleppo
- Khan al-Harir, Damascus
- Khan Jaqmaq, Damascus
- Khan al-Jumruk, Aleppo
- Khan Murad Basha, Maarat al-Numan (now, Maarat al-Numan museum)
- Khan al-Nahhasin, Aleppo
- Khan Nur-al-Din, Al-Qutayfah
- Caravanserai of Qalat el-Mudiq, Qalaat al-Madiq
- Qara Khan
- Khan Al-Rastan
- Khan al-Sabil
- Khan al-Sabun, Aleppo
- Khan al-Salihiyya, Aleppo
- Khan Shaykh 'Abd-Allah, Aleppo
- Khan Sulayman Pasha, Damascus
- Khan al Wazir, Aleppo
- Khan al-Arous, Al-Qutayfah

== Tunisia ==
- Fondouk El Attarine

== Turkey ==
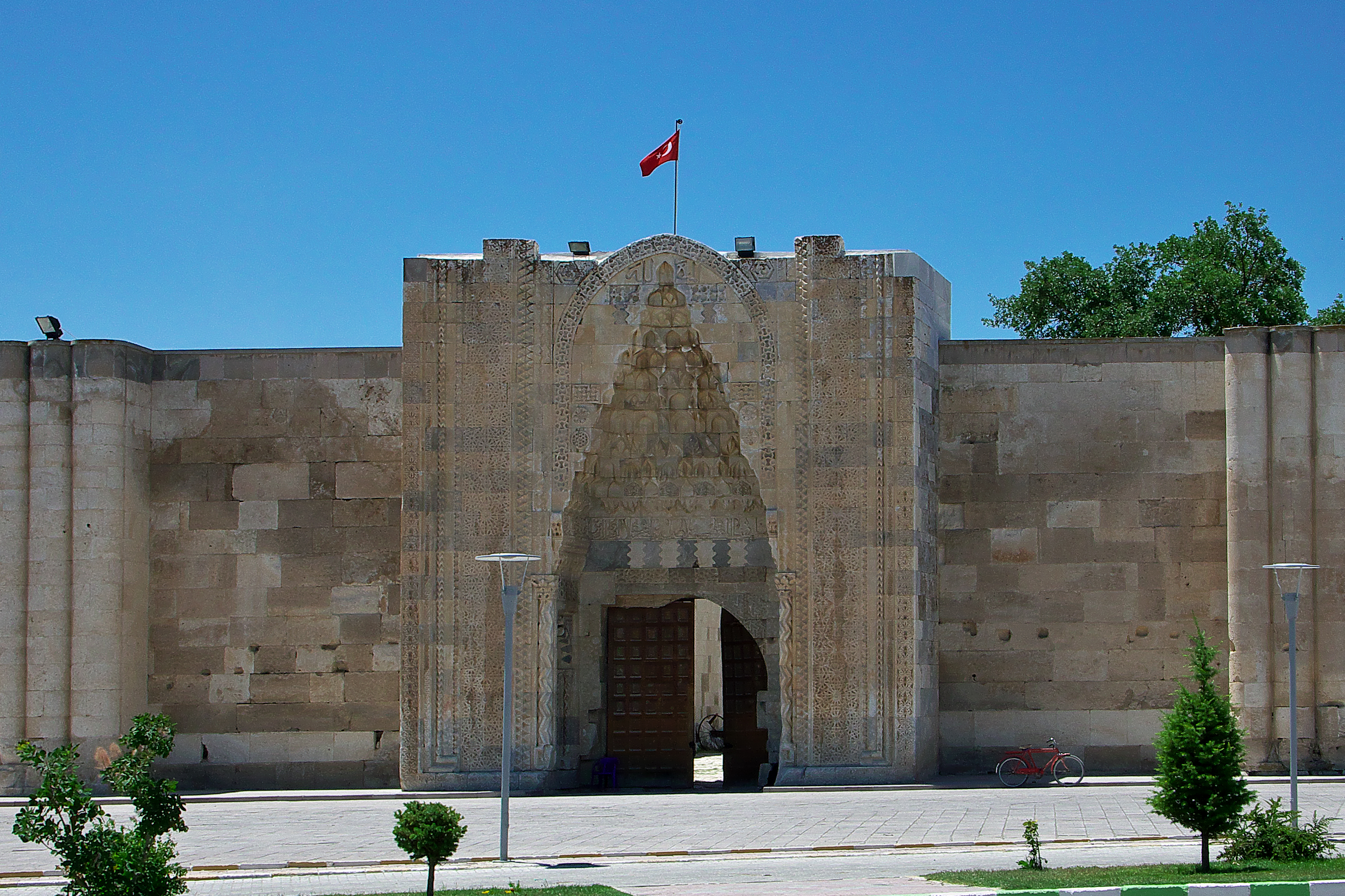
Sultan Han in the eponymous town of Sultanhanı, Turkey

- Ağzıkara Han, Aksaray Province
- Büyük Valide Han, Istanbul
- Büyük Yeni Han, Istanbul
- Caravanserai of Zor, Iğdır
- Hafsa Sultan Caravanserai, Marmaris
- Hanabad caravanserai, Çardak
- Hasan Pasha Han, Diyarbakır
- Koza Han, Bursa
- Kürkçü Han, Istanbul
- Kurtkulağı Kervansarayı, Ceyhan
- Öküz Mehmed Pasha Caravanserai, Kuşadası
- Öküz Mehmet Pasha Complex, Ulukışla
- Rüstem Pasha Caravanserai (Edirne)
- Rüstem Pasha Caravanserai (Ereğli)
- Rüstem Pasha Caravanserai, Erzurum
- Sokollu Mehmet Pasha caravanserai, Payas
- Sultan Han, Aksaray Province
- Sultan Han, Kayseri Province
- Suluhan, Ankara
- Taşhan caravanserai, Hekimhan

== Turkmenistan ==
- Dayahatyn

== Uzbekistan ==
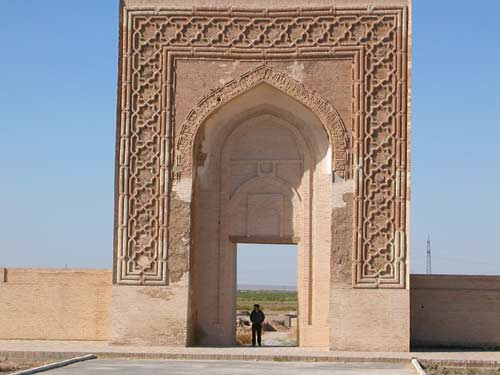
Entrance portal of Ribat-i Malik, Uzbekistan

- Kanka
- Ribat-i Malik
