= Shah Abbasi Caravanserai =

Shah Abbasi Caravansarai may refer to:

- Shah Abbasi Caravansarai, Bisotun
- Shah Abbas Caravanserai, Ganja
- Shah Abbasi Caravansarai, Karaj
- Shah Abbasi Caravansarai, Nishapur
- Shah Abbasi Caravansarai, Ray
- Shah Abbasi Caravanserai, Farasfaj
- Shah Abbasi Caravansarai, Deh Namak
