= List of caravanserais in Azerbaijan =

This is a list of caravanserais in Azerbaijan.

== List of caravanserais ==
Image	Name	State	Approximate construction date	Location
	Bukhara Caravanserai	Shirvanshah	15th century	Icheri Sheher-Baku
	Nizamaddin Caravanserai	Afsharid Empire	18th century	Icheri Sheher-Baku
	Gasim Bay's Caravanserai	Safavid Empire	17th century	Icheri Sheher-Baku
	Multani Caravanserai	Ilkhanate	14-15th century	Baku
	Eltakin Caravanserai	Eldiguzids	13th century	Khankendi
	Upper Caravanserai	Safavid Empire	18th century	Sheki
	Lower Caravanserai	Safavid Empire	18th century	Sheki
	Small Caravanserai	Shirvanshah	15th century	Baku
	Majid Caravanserai	Sajid dynasty	898	Khankendi
	Ugurlu Bay Caravanserai	Safavid Empire	17th century	Ganja
	Garghabazar Caravanserai	Safavid Empire	17th century	Fuzuli
	Khanlig Mukhtar Caravanserai	Karabakh Khanate	17-18th century	Shusha
	Caravanserai of Agha Gahraman Mirsiyab	Karabakh Khanate	18th century	Shusha
	Garachi Caravanserai	Safavid Empire	16th century	Absheron
