= Hasan Pasha Han =

Hasan Pasha Han or Hasanpaşa Han may refer to:

- Hasan Pasha Han in Diyarbakır
- Suluhan in Ankara, also known as Hasanpaşa Han
