= Mughal Serai =

Mughal Serai, Shambhu
- Interactive map of Mughal Serai, Shambhu
- Location: Shambhu, Patiala, Punjab

History
- Built: 16th century

Mughal Serai is a caravanserai situated at village Shambhu on Sher Shah Suri Marg, near Rajpura at 30.435°N 76.685°E.

== History ==
From the style of its construction, it can be inferred that it was built in the first quarter of the 17th century.

== Preserved landmark ==
It has been well-maintained by the Punjab Archaeology Department as a tourist spot.

== See also ==
- Tourism in Punjab, India
- Serai Nurmahal
