= Kulish Caravanserai =

- Interactive map of Kulish Caravanserai
- 47°33.966′N 52°01.103′E
- Location: Atyrau Region, Makhambet District, Kazakhstan

Kulish Caravanserai is a medieval archaeological monument in Kazakhstan dating to the 14th–15th centuries. It was located on a trade route connecting the city of Saraishyq with Khorezm.

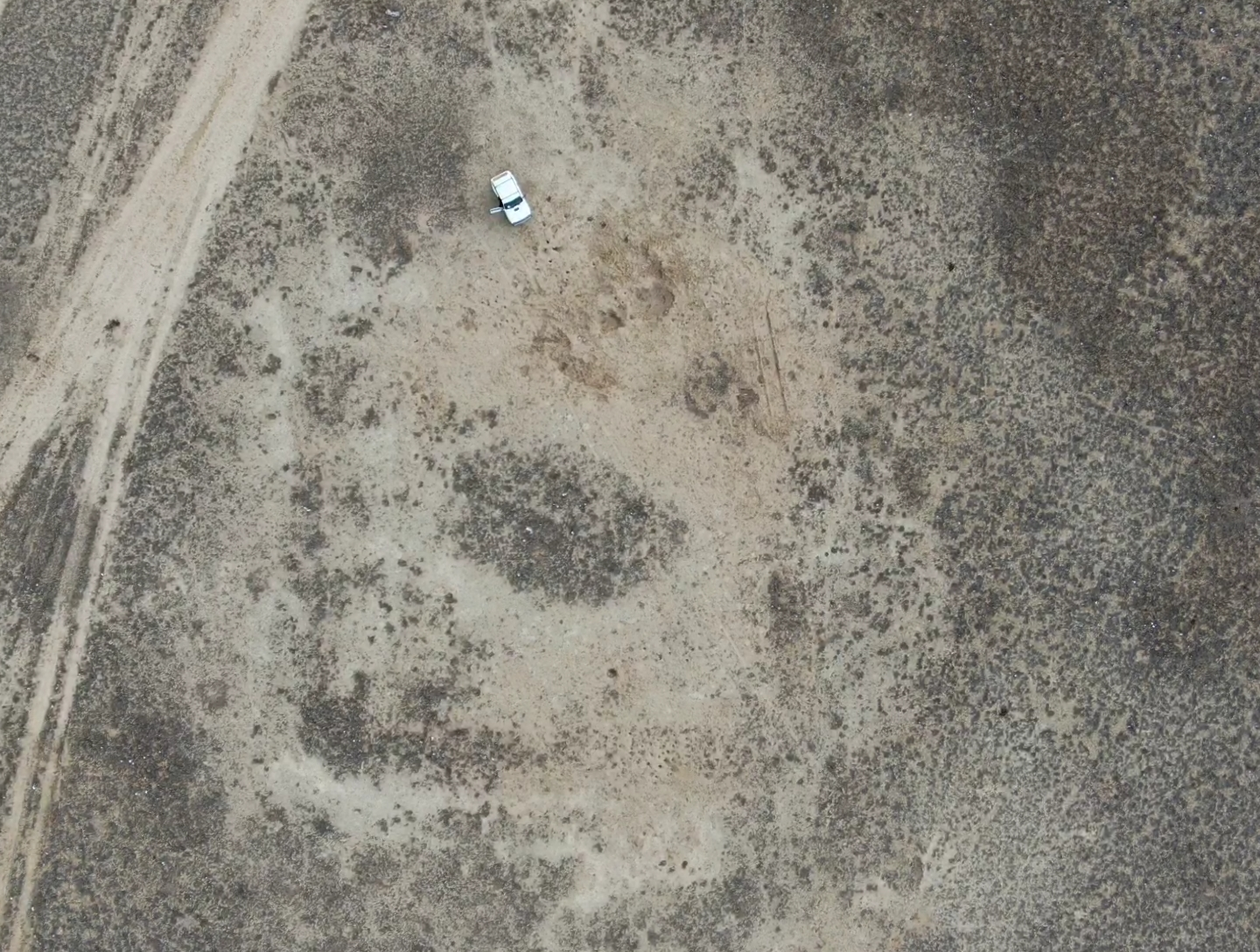
Kulish Caravanserai, 2023

== Location ==
The Kulish Caravanserai is located in the Atyrau Region, Makhambet District: 19 km northeast of the village of Alga and 21 km east of the village of Enbekshil. GPS coordinates: N 47°33.966′; E 52°01.103′.

== Archaeological research ==
In 2023, an archaeological expedition from the "Saraishyq" Museum-Reserve, conducting reconnaissance on the left bank of the Zhaiyk (Ural) River, identified the location of the Kulish caravanserai, approximately 10 km east of the Kulish well. The monument is situated about 22 km from the medieval settlement of Saraishyq in a northeast to east direction.

The monument appears as a 30–50 cm high, sub-square elevation, noticeably distinct from the surrounding terrain. The dimensions of the caravanserai ruins are approximately 42 × 38 m. The structure is oriented along a southwest-northeast line. Presumably, the gates were on the southwest side. Inner rooms were located along the walls. The central part contained a courtyard, about 20 × 12 m in size, which is a lowered platform easily distinguishable by its vegetation cover.

The caravanserai was constructed from sun-dried brick, with its walls now destroyed. The brick dimensions were approximately 42 × 25 × 7 cm. Magnetometric research indicated that the entrance was located in the southwest wall, with one room on each side of the gates. There were six living rooms each in the western and eastern wings, totaling 14 rooms. In the northern part of the structure, elongated utility and storage rooms arranged in two rows were recorded.

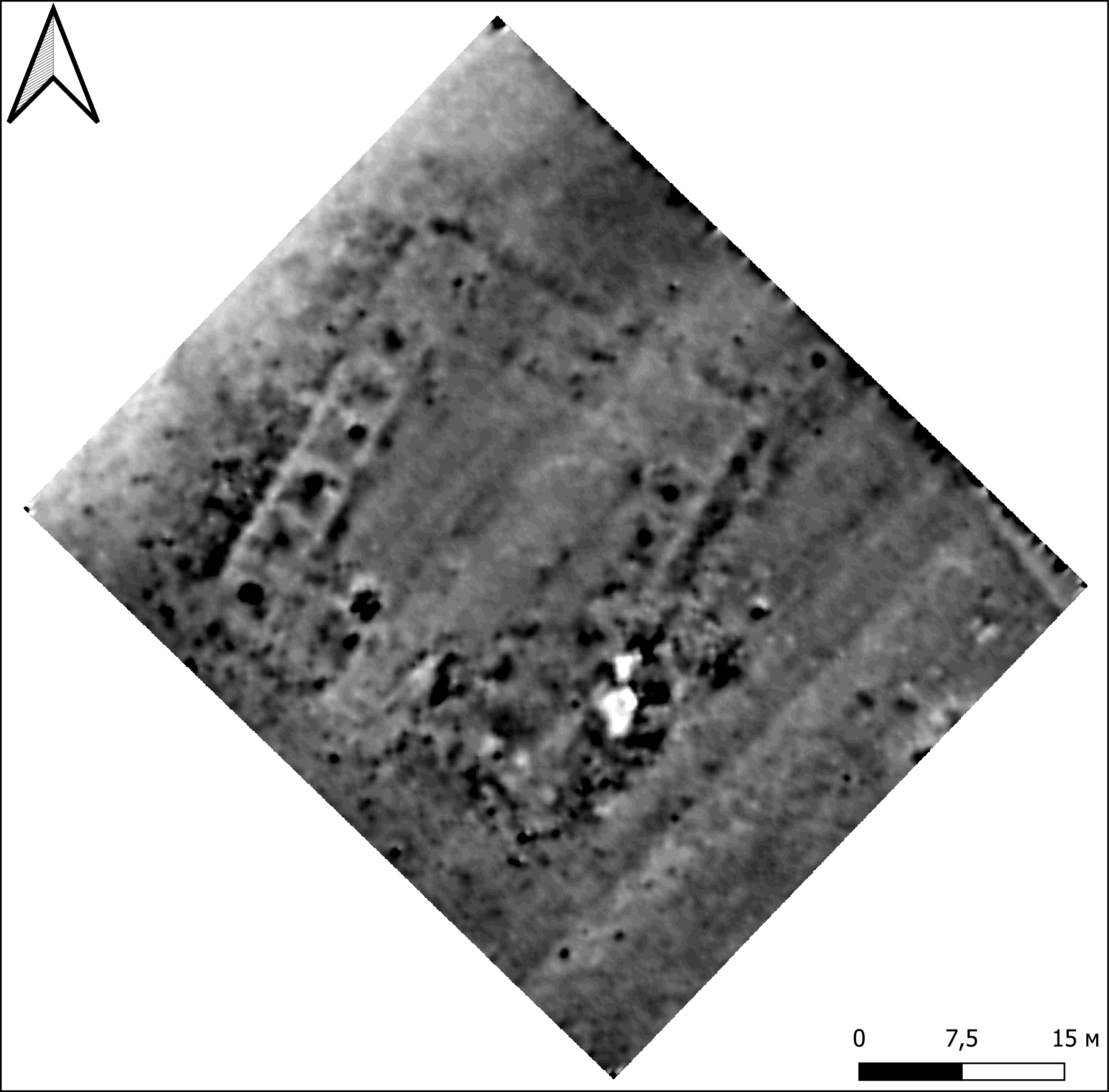
Kulish Caravanserai. Magnetic survey, 2023

The surface of the elevation and the adjacent area are saturated with fragments of ceramic vessels. Pieces of red-clay pottery predominate, with fragments of gray-clay and glazed ware found significantly less frequently. Analysis of the ceramic complex points to close connections with Khorezmian traditions of pottery production.

To the west and south of the caravanserai, along a gully, about 80 dug pits, interpreted as wells, have been recorded. Presumably, they were used not only for collecting water but also as quarries for extracting clay used in brick-making.

== Sources ==
- Reconstruction of the planigraphy of the Golden Horde-period Kulish caravanserai (Western Kazakhstan) based on magnetic survey
- Golden Horde Cities, Caravanserais, and Caravan Routes in Western Kazakhstan: interdisciplinary studies (13th–15th centuries)
