= Hafsa Sultan Caravanserai =

- Location within Turkey

General information
- Type: Caravanserai
- Architectural style: Ottoman
- Location: Marmaris ilçe (district) of Muğla Province, Turkey
- Coordinates: 36°51′05″N 28°16′25″E
- Named for: Hafsa Sultan
- Opened: 1545

Other information
- Number of rooms: 8

Hafsa Sultan Caravanserai (Turkish: Hafsa Sultan Kervansarayı) is a 16th-century caravansarai in Marmaris ilçe (district) of Muğla Province, southwestern Turkey. It is situated to the north of the Marmaris Castle and the harbor at 36°51′05″N 28°16′25″E.

== History ==
Caravanserais were medieval-age inns in the Islamic countries. Marmaris Caravanserai was commissioned by the Ottoman sultan Suleiman the Magnificent (reigned 1520–1566) during his campaign to Rhodes in 1522–23. In this campaign, the main Anatolian base of the Ottoman army was in Marmaris. The building, with one big and seven small rooms, was constructed to serve as headquarters. Following the conquest of the island, the building was transformed into a caravanserai. According to the inscription of the building, it was opened to service in 1545. It was named after Suleiman's mother Hafsa Sultan (1479–1534).

== Modern usage ==
Currently, the caravanserai is a private property and its rooms have been rented to touristic shops and taverns. However it is planned to restore the building and transform it to a museum.
