= Baba Ghodrat Caravansarai =

Iranian national heritage site

Coordinates: 36.271806°N 59.6196082°E

- کاروانسرای باباقدرت
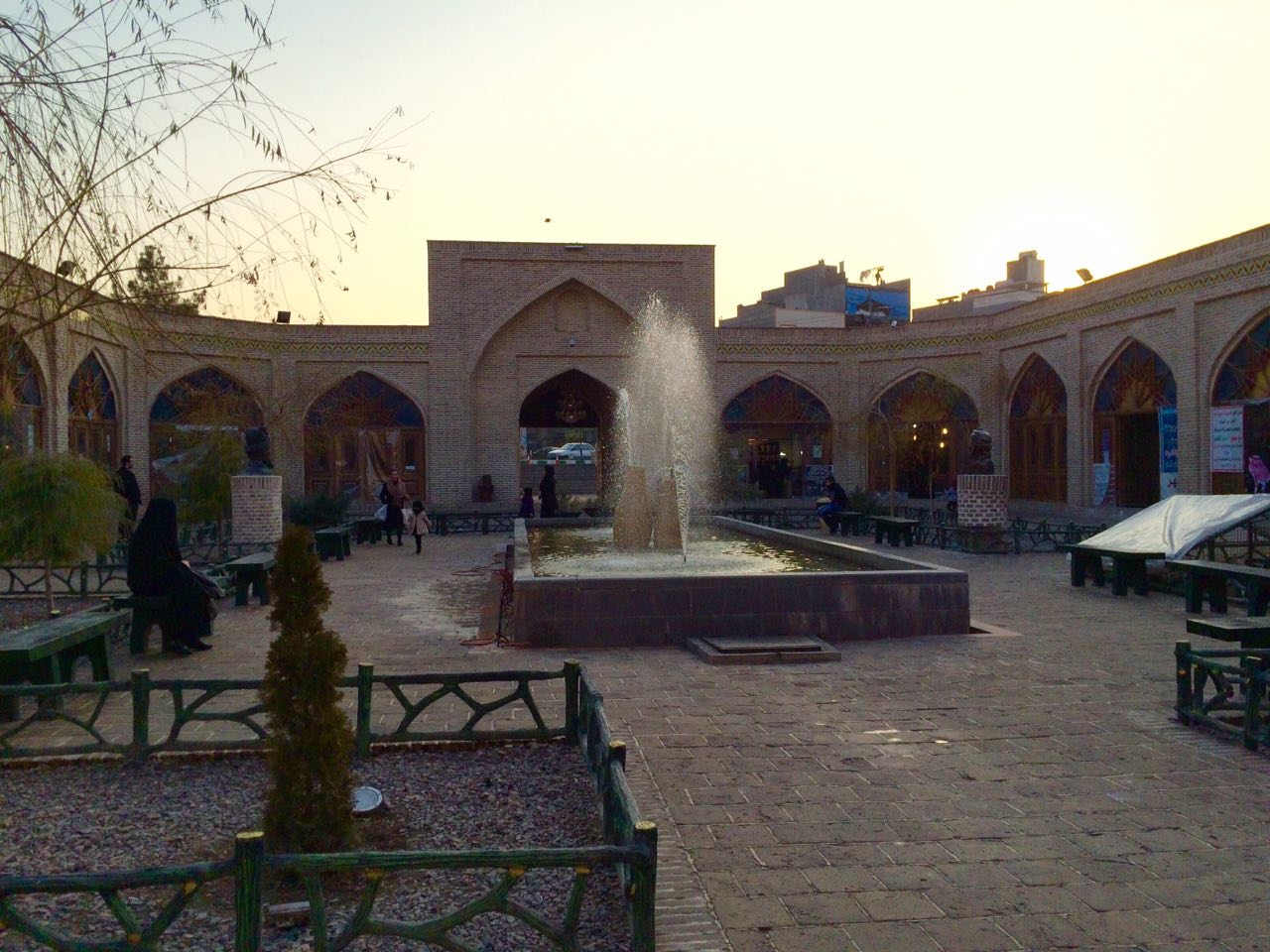
- Interactive map of the Baba Ghodrat Caravansarai area

General information
- Type: Caravanserai
- Architectural style: Qajar architecture
- Location: Mashhad, Razavi Khorasan province, Iran
- Construction started: Qajar Iran

The Baba Ghodrat Caravansarai (Persian: کاروانسرای باباقدرت) is a historic Qajar era caravanserai in Mashhad, Iran.
