= Two-Storeyed Caravanserai (Shusha) =

19th c. caravanserai in Shusha

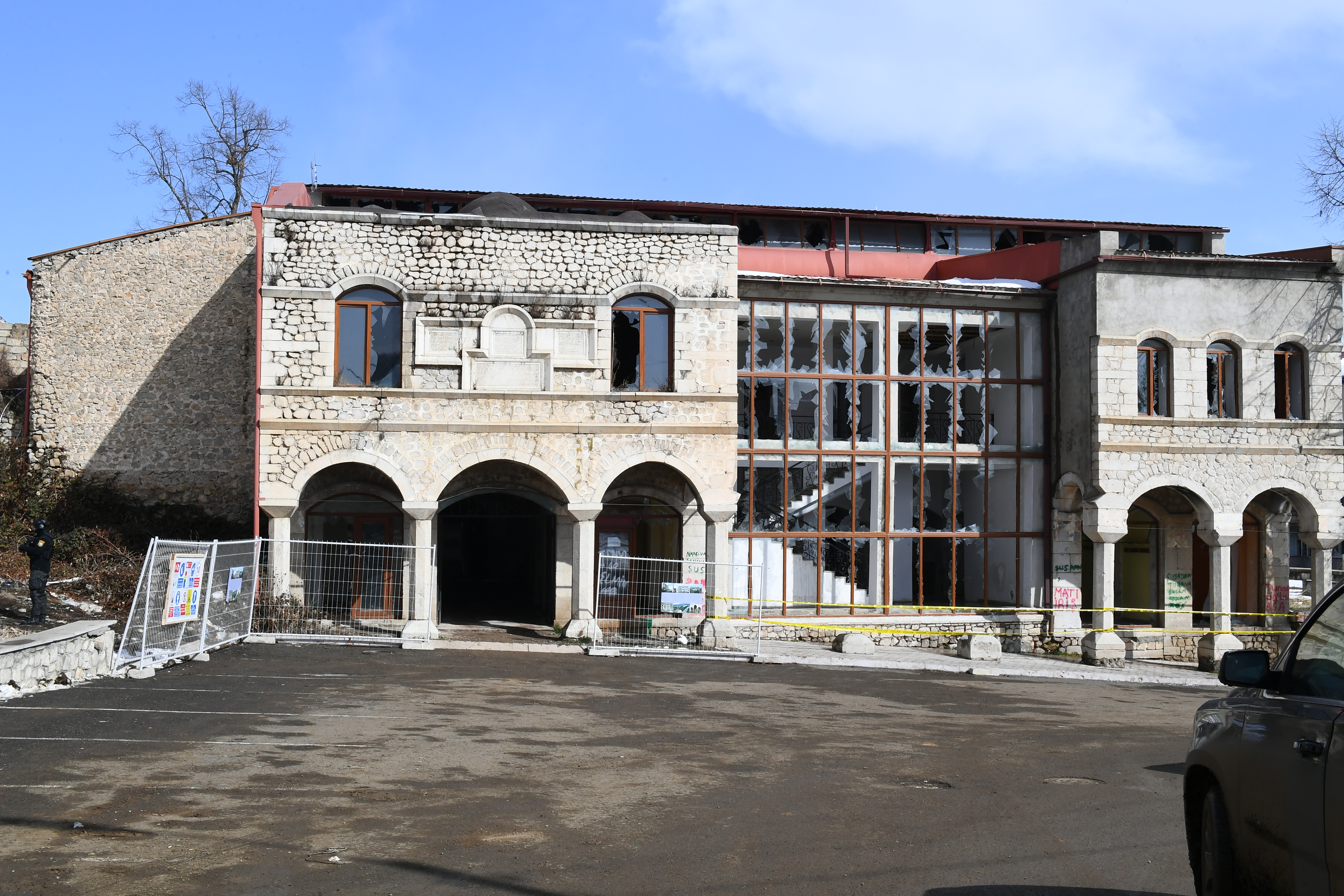
- Interactive map of the Two-Storeyed Caravanserai area

General information
- Location: H. Rzayeva 9, Shusha, Azerbaijan
- Coordinates: 39°45′47″N 46°45′23″E
- Completed: XIX century
- Owner: Mashadi Huseyn

Two-Storeyed Caravanserai (Azerbaijani: İkimərtəbəli karvansara, Armenian: Երկհարկանի քարավանատուն, Persian: کاروانسرای دو طبقه) is a caravanserai built in Shusha in the 19th century. It is a two-storeyed hotel-style caravanserai in the Sheytan Bazaar part of Shusha.

== About ==
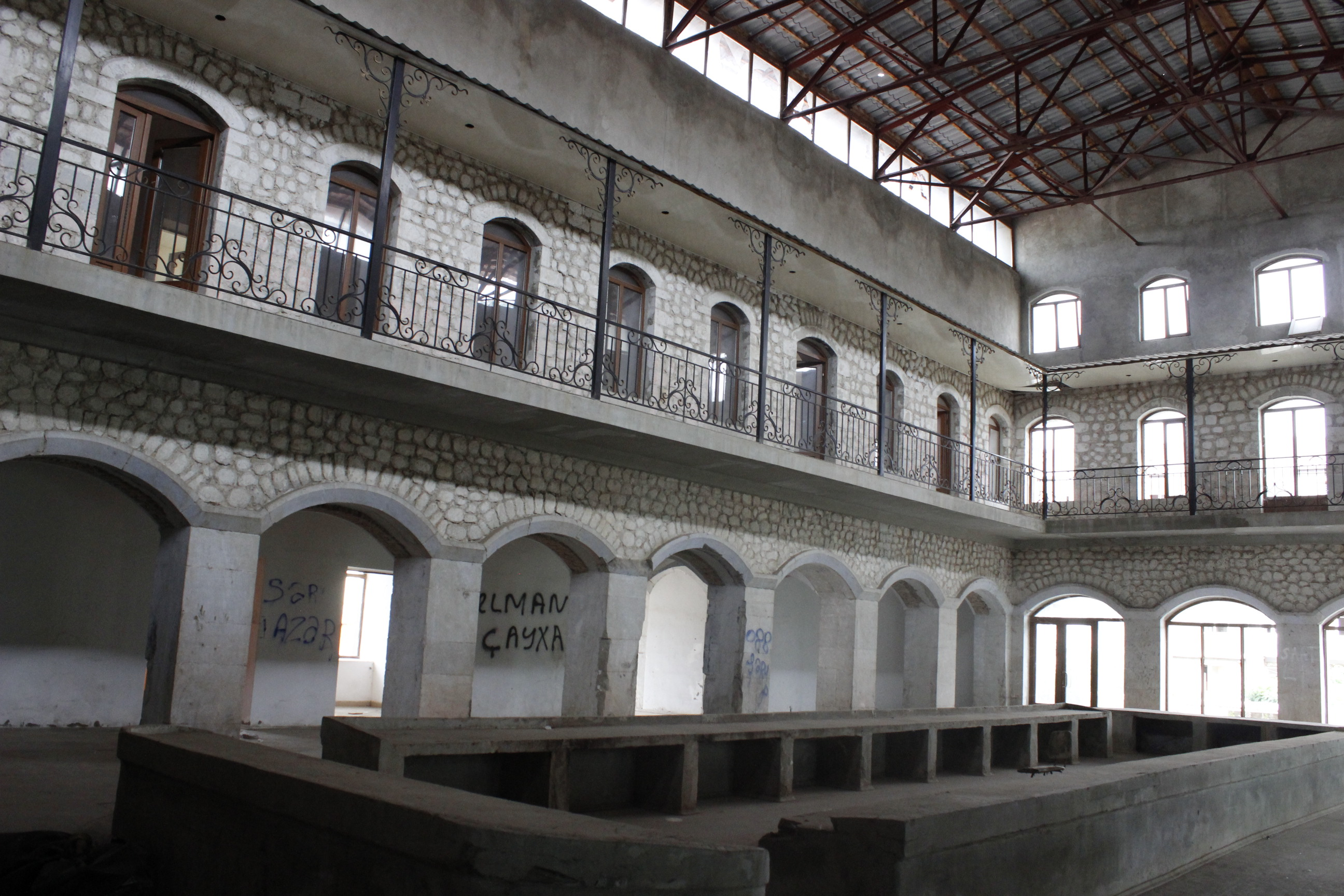
Interior of the two-storeyed caravanserai

In the second half of the 19th century (1888–1889), Mashadi Huseyn Mir Sayyaf oghlu, after buying the caravanserai of Haji Amiraslan bey, demolished it and built a new one in its place, and it was popularly known as Mir Sayyaf oghlu's caravanserai. After the death of Mashadi Huseyn, his sons Gahraman and Mashadi Shukur started to jointly run the caravanserai. The novelty of the new caravanserai was the presence of a three-nave mosque with a prayer hall measuring approximately 9x8 meters on the second floor of the building.

On the first floor, there were about twenty shops, a barber's shop, a shoemaker, a tailor, a tailor, a hatter, a farrier and other shops, several commercial shops, and a mosque for performing religious rites. On the second floor, there were 25 guest rooms. On the north side, there were 4 additional shops, 3 sidestreets and a weigher.

Merchants from not only the cities of the Caucasus, but also Iran, Iraq, Turkey, Arabia, Central Asia, Russia and other European countries stayed in caravanserai. Until recently, a covered city market operated here.
