= Stari Han (Kosjerić) =

Cultural Monument of Exceptional Importance in Kremna, Serbia

- Стари хан (Serbian)
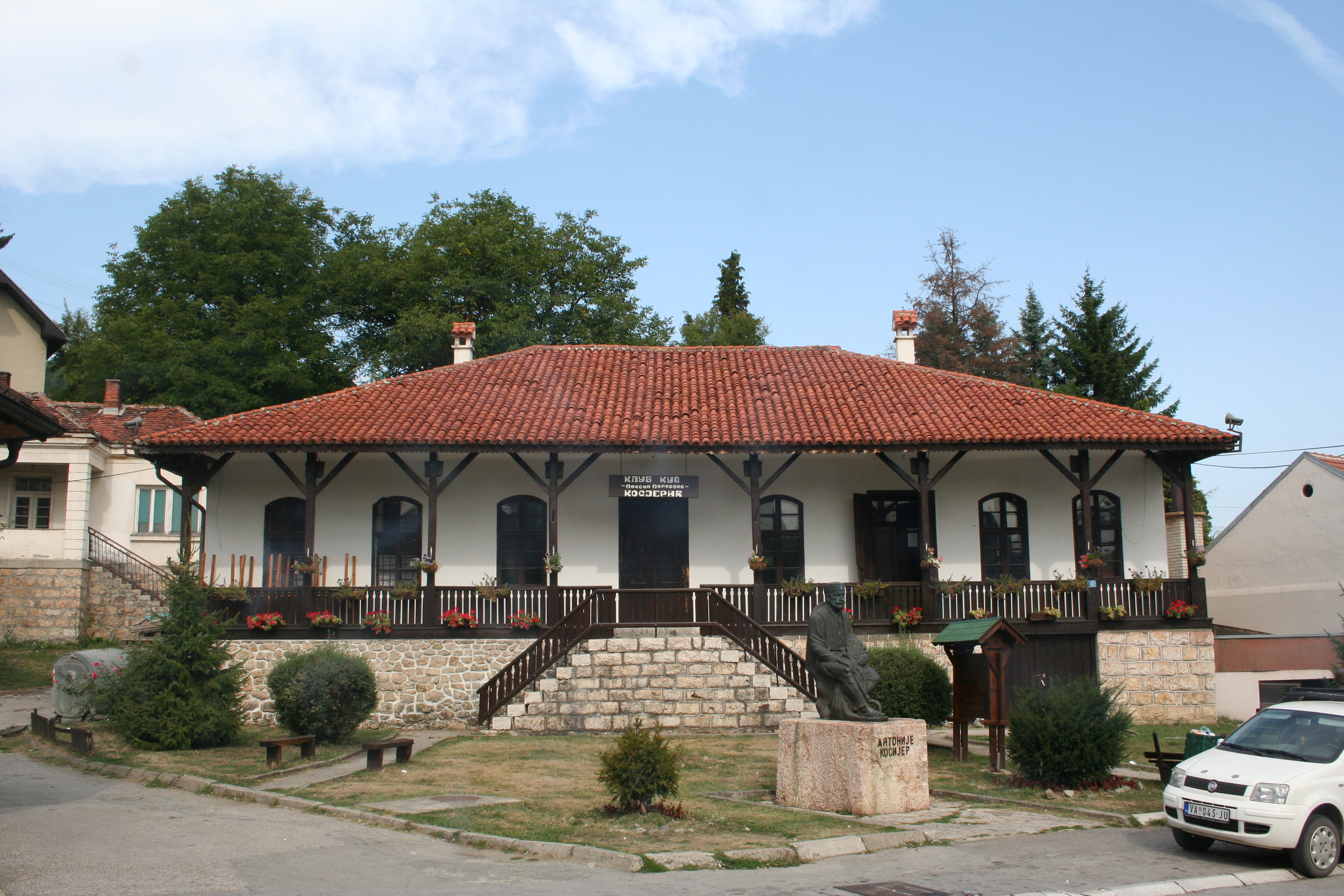

- Location within Serbia
- Location: Kosjerić, Zlatibor District, Serbia

History
- Built: 1854
- Original use: Caravanserai

The Stari Han (Serbian Cyrillic: Стари хан) is a former caravanserai in Kosjerić, Zlatibor District, Serbia. It was built in Ottoman style by Antonije Radojević in 1854 to serve travelers along the road from Dubrovnik to Belgrade. In 2019, ten million dinars were granted to renovate the building, which has been under state protection since the 1980s as a cultural monument.

== Gallery ==
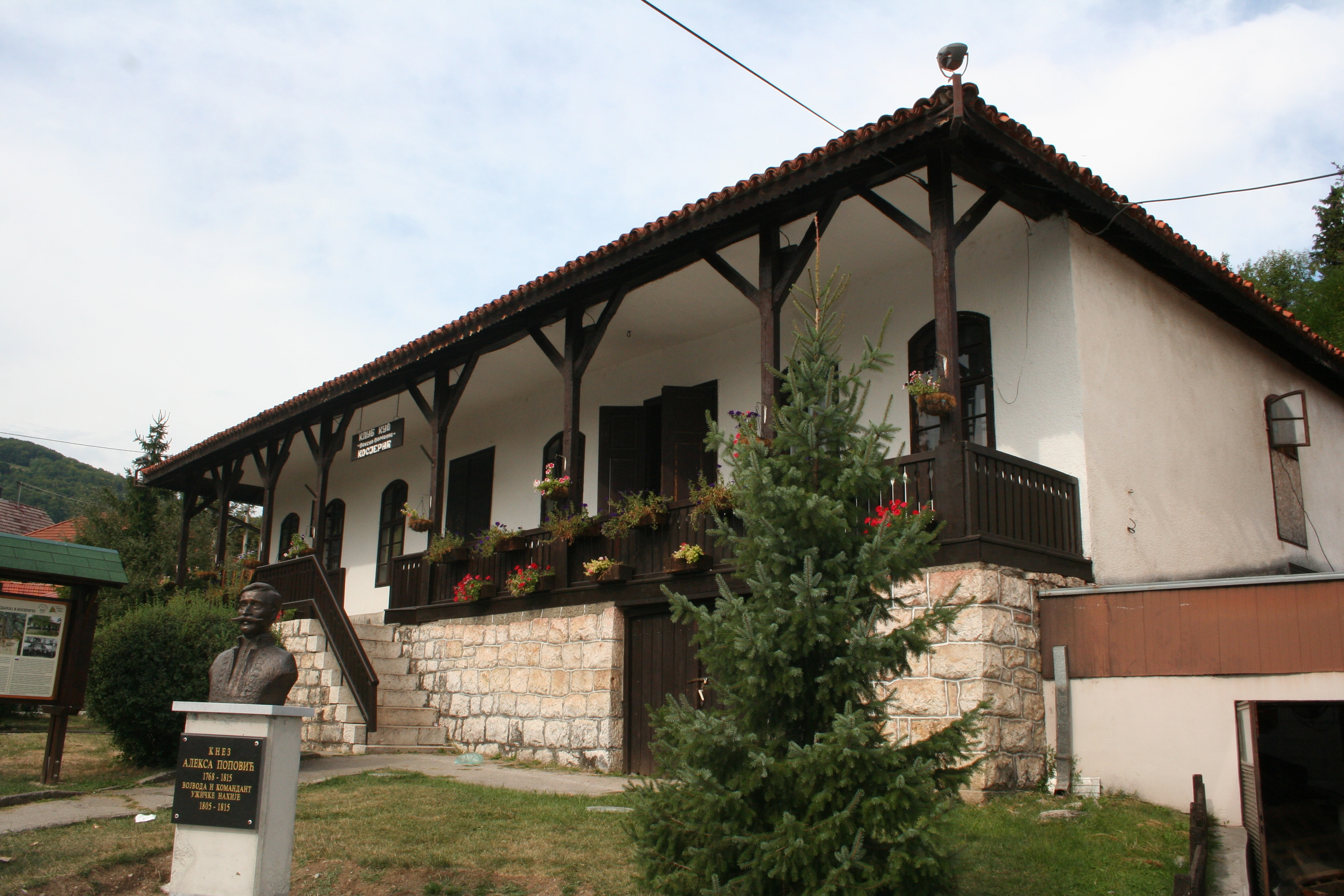

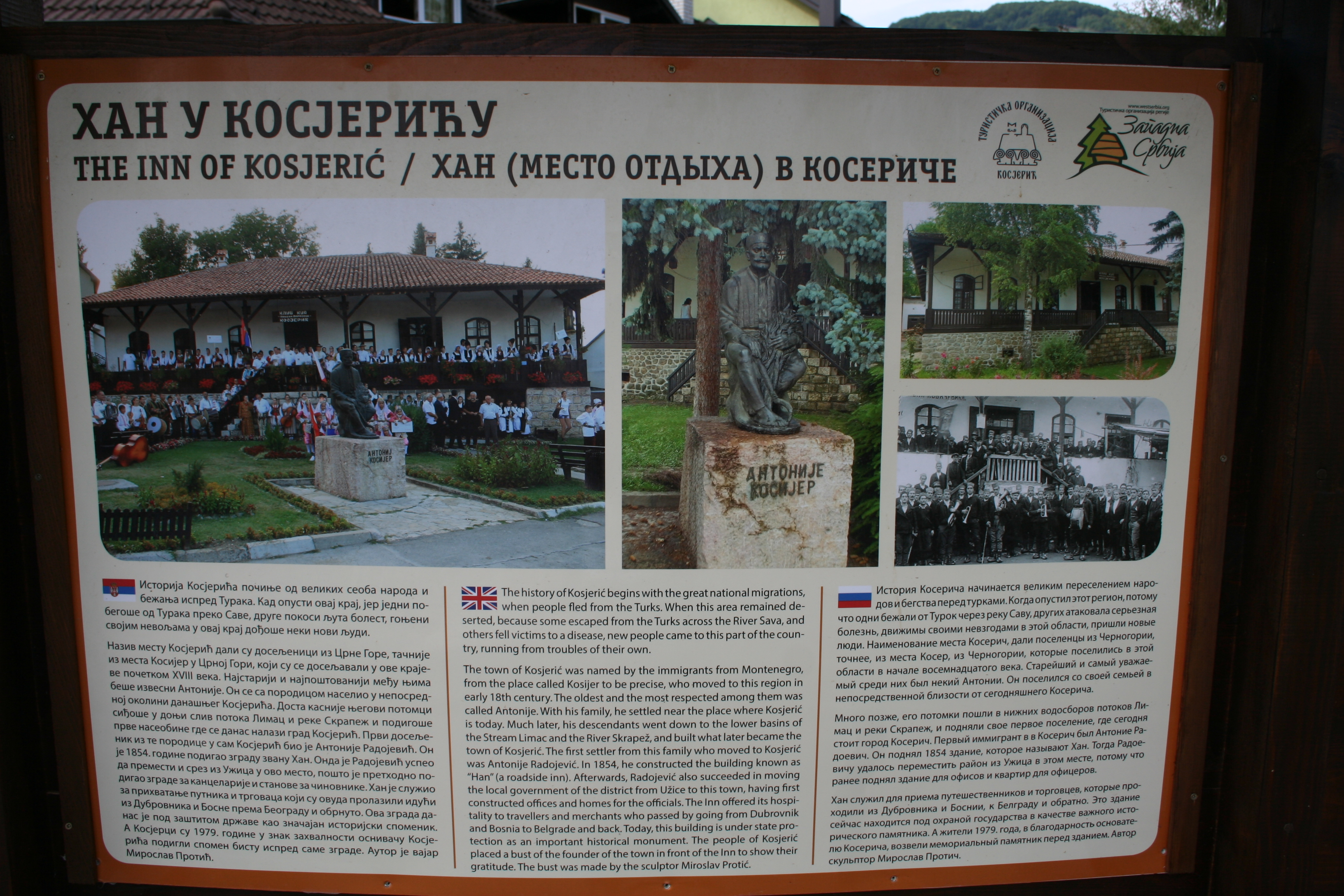

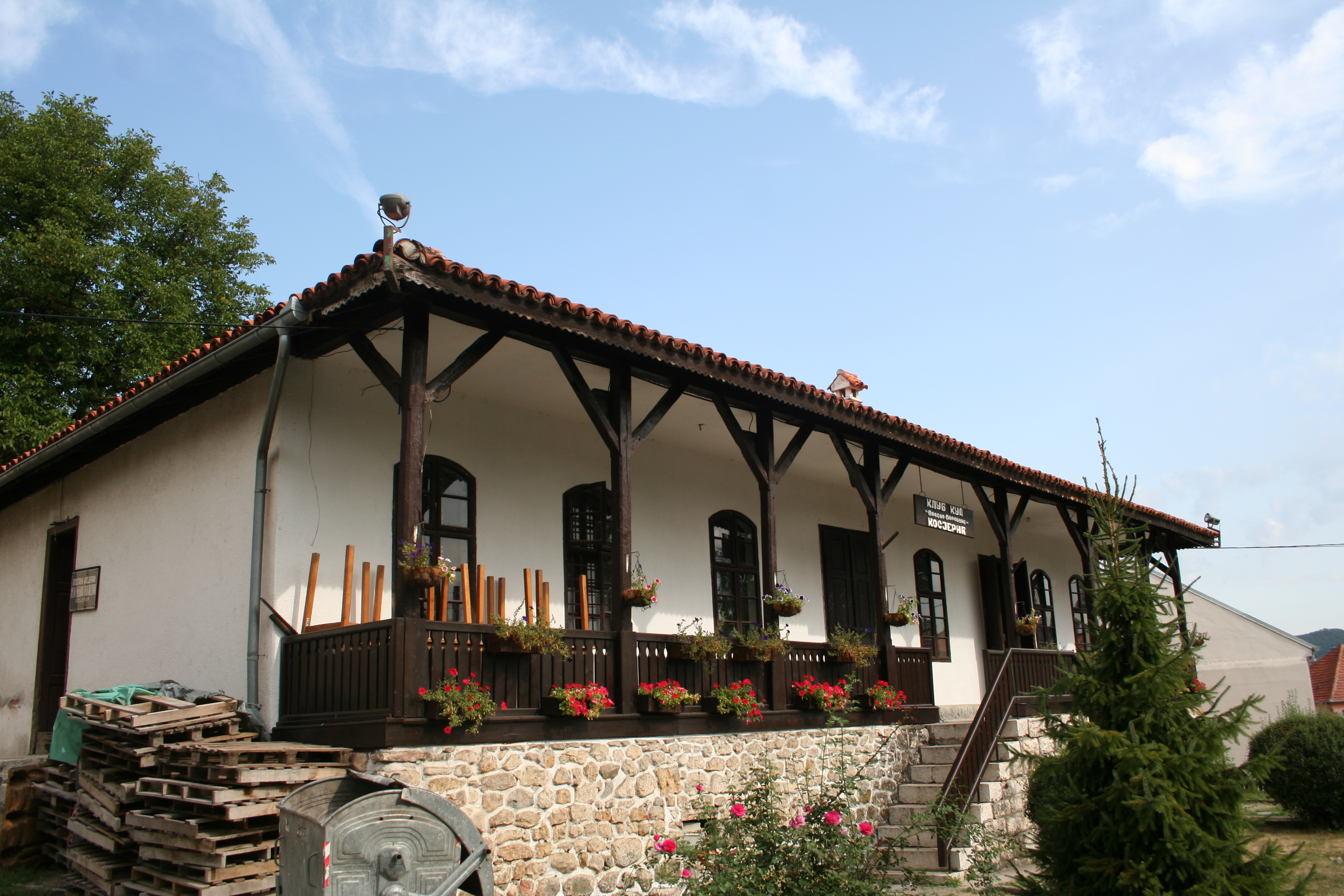

== See also ==
- Architecture of Serbia
