= Ashaghy caravanserai =

- Azerbaijani: Aşağı karvansara
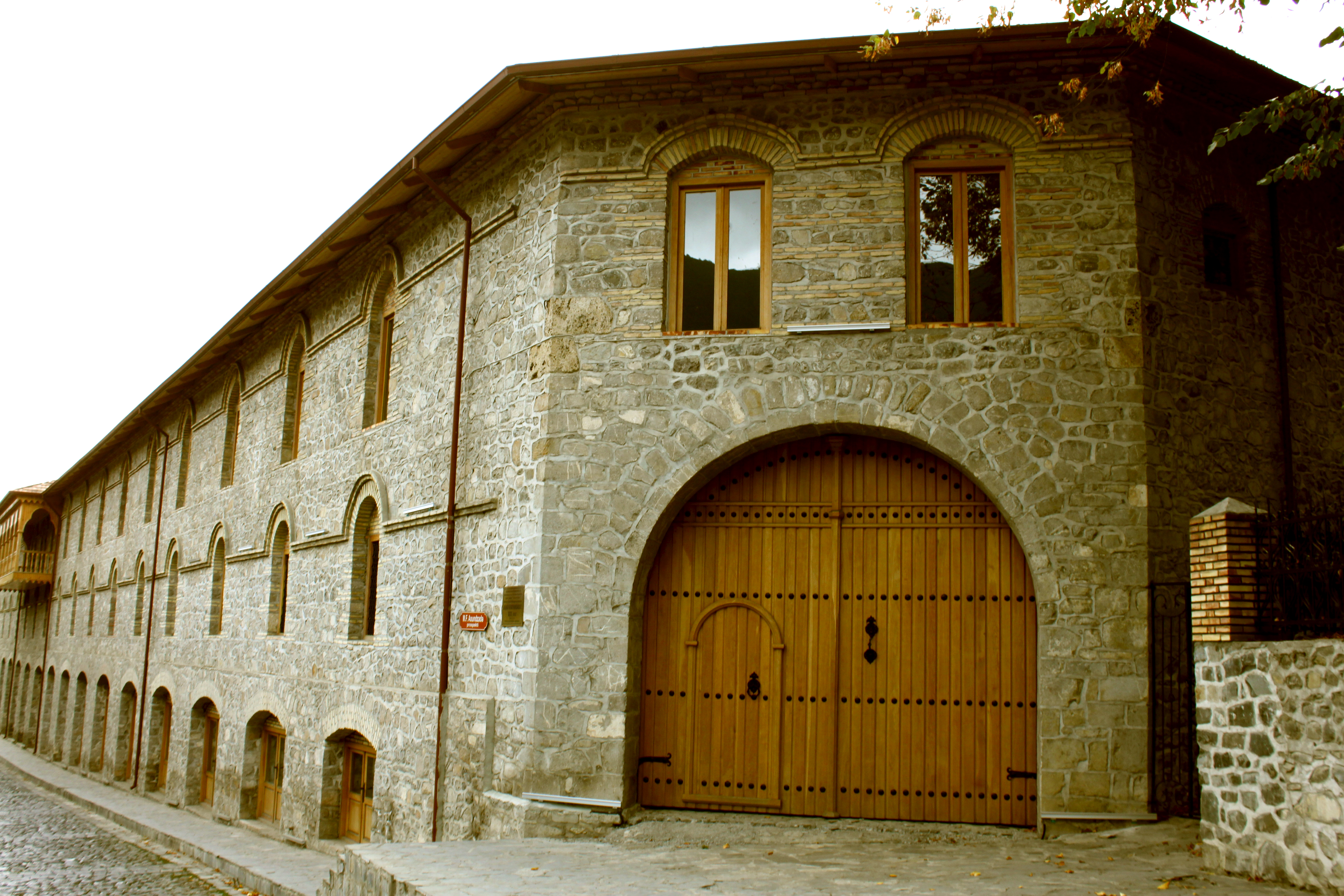

- Location within Azerbaijan

General information
- Location: Shaki, Azerbaijan
- Coordinates: 41°12′03″N 47°11′29″E
- Completed: 17th century

Ashaghy caravanserai or Lower Caravanserai (Azerbaijani: Aşağı karvansara) is a historical monument of the 17th century located in Azerbaijan, in the city of Sheki.

The caravanserai is placed on a difficult terrain (the fast-flowing river Gurjanachay flows next to the caravanserai) and has the shape of a trapezoid. The total area of the building is about 8000 m^{2}. It has a capacity of about 242 rooms.

The caravanserai has entrance gates on four sides. When the gates were closed, the caravanserai turned into an inaccessible fortress. The Ashaghy Caravanserai, like the Upper Caravanserai, has preserved the traits inherent in the caravanserais of the East.

The Lower and the Upper caravanserais, were built by local craftsmen, and in terms of their planning structure, large size and convenience for trade, are the largest ones recorded on the territory of Transcaucasia.

== See also ==
- Shaki Caravanserai
- Small Caravanserai
- Garghabazar Caravanserai

== Literature ==
- Salamzadeh, Abdulvahab; Məmmədzadə, Kamil (1987). Архитектурные памятники Шеки. Baku: Elm. p. 140.
