= Wikala of Bazar'a =

- وكالة بازرعة
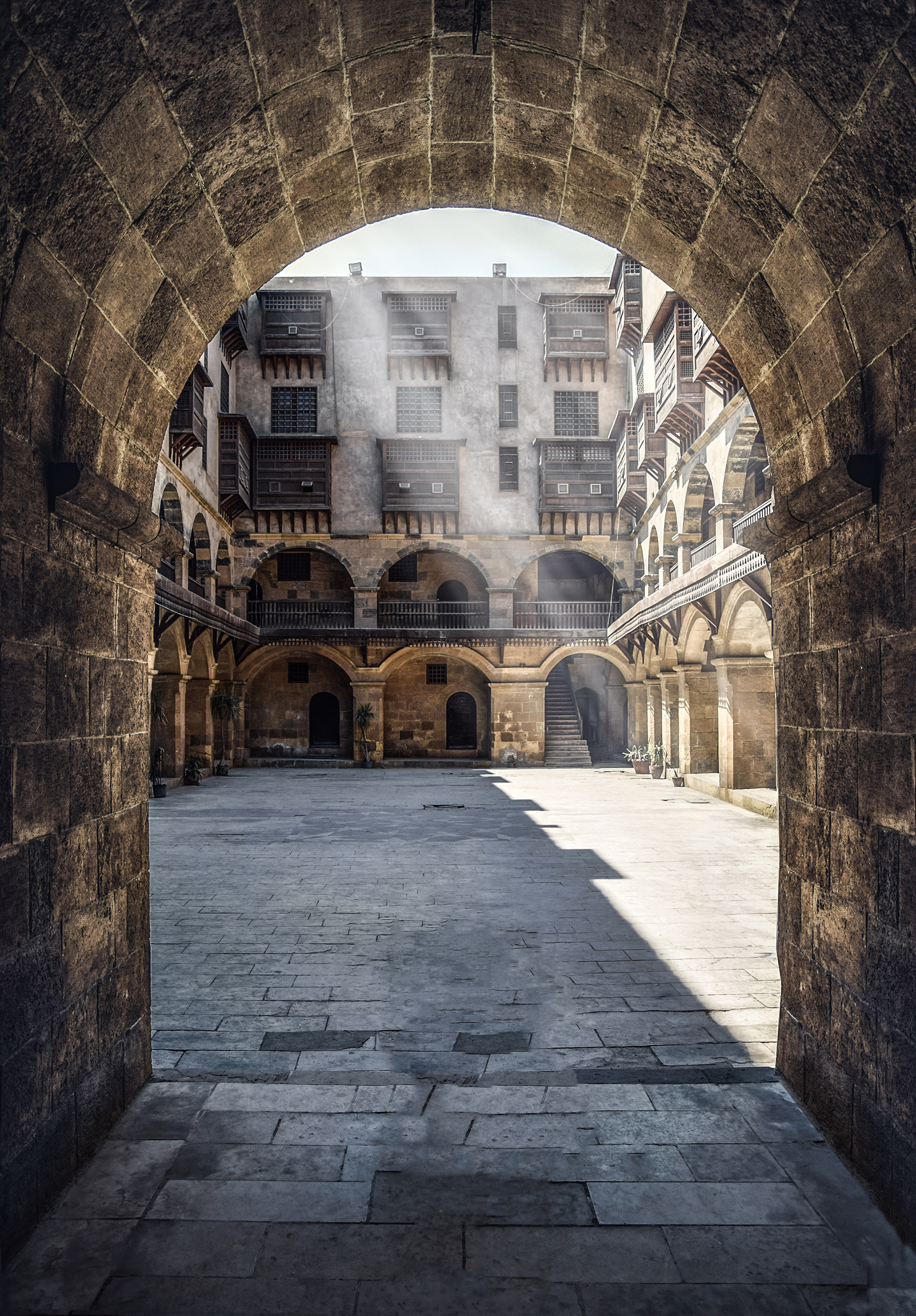
- Interactive map of the Wikala of Bazar'a area
- Former names: Wikala of Al-Kikhiya
- Alternative names: Wikalat Bazar'a

General information
- Type: Caravanserai, apartment complex
- Architectural style: mixed Mamluk-Ottoman architecture
- Location: Cairo, Egypt, El-Tambakshia Street - El-Gamaleya area - Al-Azhar neighborhood, Cairo Governorate, Egypt
- Coordinates: 30°03′02″N 31°15′46″E
- Completed: 17th century
- Renovated: 2002
- Client: Muhammad Bazar'a

The Wikala of Bazar'a (Egyptian Arabic: وكالة بازرعة) or Wikala of Al-Kikhiya (وكالة الكيخيا) is located on El-Tambakshia Street in El-Gamaleya area, in the Al-Azhar neighborhood in Cairo. It is one of the most famous archaeological wikalat built in Egypt during the period of Ottoman rule in the 11th century AH (17th century AD). The wikala was previously known as Wikala of Al-Kikhiya, after Hassan Katkhuda, nicknamed “Al-Kikhiya,” and it was intended to sell timber. It remained known by this name until the late 19th century, when it was bought by Muhammad Bazar'a, a merchant of Hadrami origin. Then he called it “Wikala of Bazar'a” and devoted it to selling Nabulsi soap and Yemeni coffee.

== Function and description ==
The wikala (Arabic: وكالة; sometimes wakala or wekala) is a term for an urban caravanserai, a building which housed merchants and their goods and served as a center for trade, storage, transactions and other commercial activity. Merchants could thus base themselves here to do business in the city. The word wikala means roughly "agency" in Arabic; in this case, a commercial agency, which may also have been a reference to the customs offices that could be located here to deal with imported goods.

The layout of the Wikala of Bazar'a was drawn up on the basis of the layout of the interior, so that the elements of the wikala and its units are organized around a courtyard or an open rectangular courtyard, according to the style that prevailed in the Mamluk era. The wikala consists of two parts: the first is commercial, which includes partitions organized around the courtyard on the ground and first floors, in addition to the shops overlooking the main facade of the agency on El-Tambakshia Street on the ground floor.

As for the second part, it is a residential wing consisting of two floors at the top of the partitions. Each residential unit consists of a first floor with an entrance, a bathroom, a small kitchen, a staircase, a reception hall, and a living room two floors high.

The wikala has two entrances: the first is a main entrance that leads to the wikala’s courtyard, and the second is a private entrance that leads to the upper residential units and is not connected to the courtyard. It ascends directly to the residential floors, taking into account privacy and separating commercial traffic from guest traffic. The two entrances are located on the wikala's northern facade, while the rest of the agency's facades are adjacent to neighboring buildings. The most important feature that distinguishes the main facade of the agency is the entrance block, which is about 5.40 meters wide and crowned by a “semicircular” motor arch made up of stone castanets. Topping the entrance block is an opening containing the main door, which consists of two unadorned wooden leaves. Surrounding the entrance block and the main door is a “jaft la'eb” (جفت لاعب), which is a type of decoration that spread in the Mamluk and Ottoman era using the letter “M” in a geometric manner, and here we find it forming hexagonal M's.

The length of the courtyard of the wikala is 27.65 meters and its width is 10.75 metres. As for its four walls, it consists of baikat (arches), each of the baika (arch) consisting of two rows of arches, one above the other. These arches carry square stone supports that represent the facade of the corridor that precedes the partitions in the courtyard on the ground and first floors. Above the partitions of the first floor there is a wooden shelf decorated on its facade with floral decorations. This decoration is carried on wooden kawabil (كوابيل).

As for the residential parts and their annexes, they overlook the courtyard through window openings. Each opening is closed with either a veil window made of lathe wood or a wooden mashrabiya made of lathe wood. Each mashrabiya carries a set of wooden kawabil. Strong stones were used in building the ground and first floor of the agency as load-bearing walls, while the rest of the agency was built of Al-Ajar Al-Ahmar (red bricks) and covered with a layer of lime. The "Al-Mashhar" (المشهر) color scheme was also used on the facade of the wikala, the facade of the ground floor, and the first floor of the interior, which is the use of yellow and black colors in painting the stone, which is a type of decoration that has been used since the beginning of the Mamluk era.

== Renovation ==
In March 2002, restoration and maintenance work began at the wikala, which took about three years and cost about 5 million Egyptian pounds. It was decided to transform it into an international center for traditional and artistic crafts. Maintenance work included careful architectural restoration of walls and partitions. It included cleaning all the “arabesque” wood, including mashrabiyat, windows, and doors, painting it with materials that preserve the nature of the wood and not affecting its antique nature, changing the bank tiles that had eroded over time, and providing the wikala with lighting systems of the highest level.
