= Elbasan Han =

Coordinates: 40.6182°N 20.7750°E

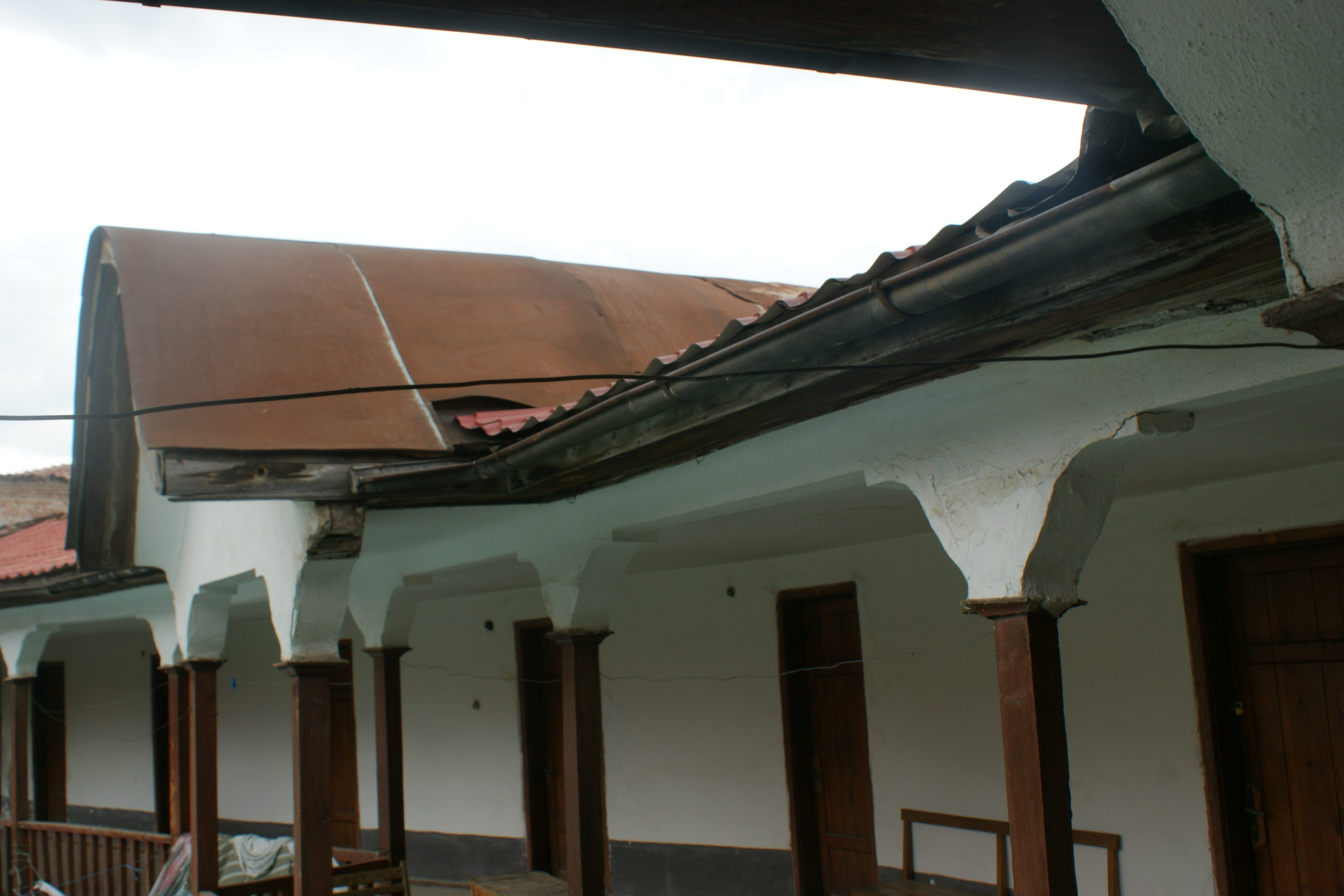
Elbasan Han

Elbasan Inn is a historic inn in Korçë, Albania. It is said to be several centuries old and the oldest hotel in the city. It is built in the Ottoman architectural style. The inn used to serve the merchants and tradesmen who sold their wares in the outside bazaar.

Around the year 2018, the building was rebuilt to the boutique hotel.
