= Serai Nurmahal =

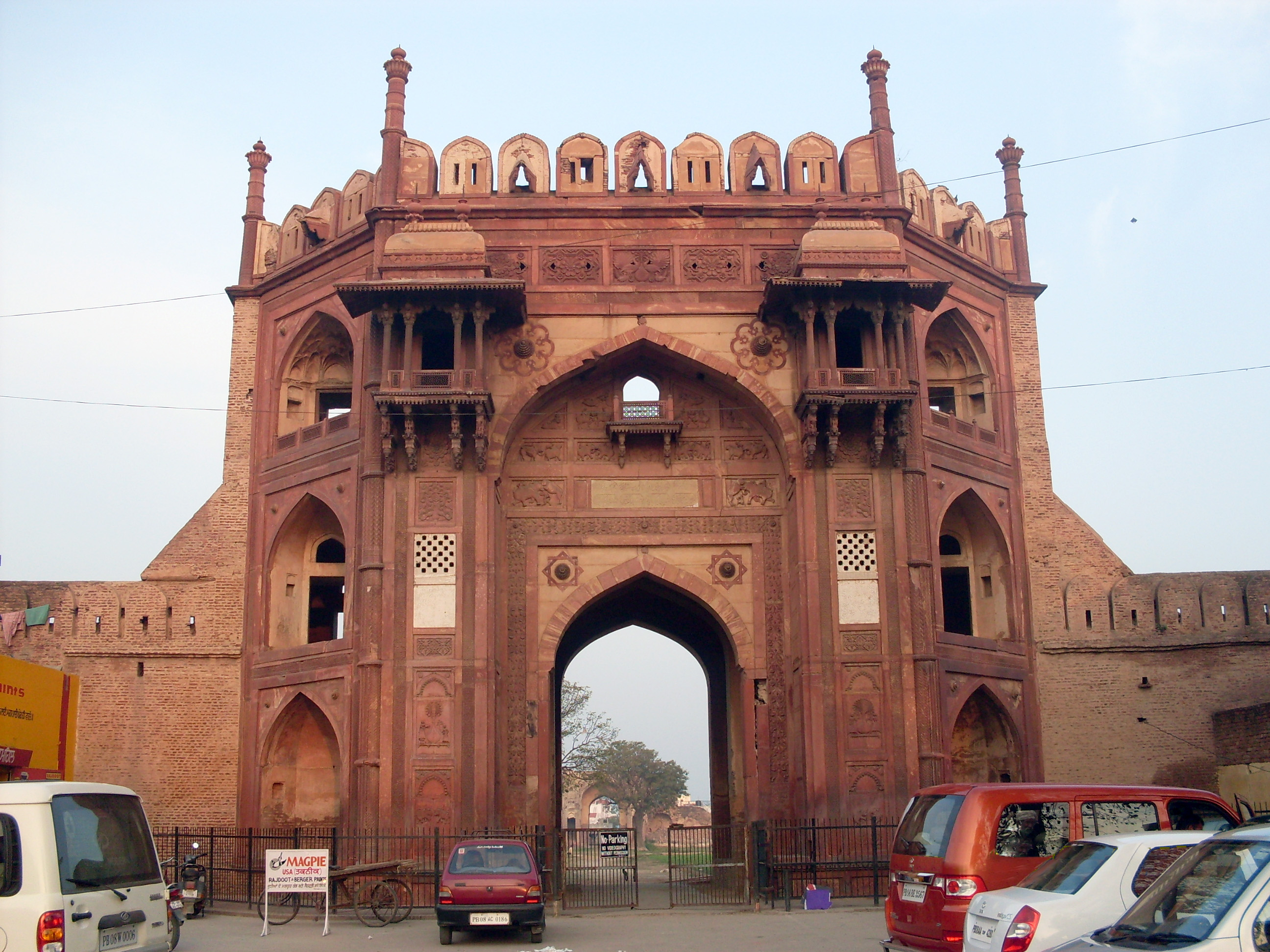
- The Nurmahal Sarai
- Interactive map of Serai Nurmahal
- Type: caravanserai
- Location: Nurmahal, Punjab

History
- Built: 1618

Site notes
- Architectural style: Mughal architecture

Serai Nurmahal (Mughal Serai) is an inn of historical importance located at Nurmahal, near Jalandhar.

== History ==
The Mughal age was an age of development in almost every field including economy. The growing importance of trade and commerce and politics, led to the construction of a network of roads that connected places of commercial and political interests. Along the sides of these roads shady trees were planted, wells dug out and resting places for travellers called serais were constructed.

The serai was constructed on the orders of Noor Jahan, wife of the Mughal Emperor Jahangir under the supervision of Zakariya Khan in 1618AD, then Governor of the Doab. Nurmahal got its name from Noor Jahan, who is said to have been brought up here.

== Location And Design ==
Nurmahal is situated 16 miles south of Jalandhar, 25 miles east south-east of Sultanpur and 13 miles west of Pahlor.

The serai was built on a site measuring 551 square feet. It had octagonal towers at the corners. The western gateway, called Lahore gate is double-storied and built in red sandstone. Its front is divided into panels ornamented in sculptured relief. There were figures of angels, lotuses, nymphs, lions, elephants, birds, peacocks, men on horseback, etc. The scenes represented by many of these had scenes of elephant fight or four horsemen playing Chaugan. Over the entrance to the gateway is an inscription, flanked by scenes of fighting animals and sculpted lotus mounds. The inscription written in four rhyming verses, reads as follows:

1. During the just rule of Jahangir Shah, son of Akbar Shah, whose neither heaven nor earth remembers.
2. The Nur Saray was founded in the district of Phalor by command of that angel, Nur Jahan Begam.
3. The poet happily discovered this date of its foundation: this Saray was founded by Nur Jahan Begam in 1028.
4. Knowledge of the date of its completion was found in the words: "This Saray was erected by Nur Jahan Begam" 1030.

There were plenty of rooms, Emperor's quarters, a well and a mosque inside the serai area. Jahangir mentions this serai in his memoirs when he says:

...I took up my quarters in Nur-Saray. At this spot the Vakils of Nur Jahan Begam had built a lofty house, and made a royal garden. It was now completed. On this account the Begam, having begged for an entertainment, prepared a grand feast, and by the way of offering, with great pains produced all kinds of delicate and rare things. In order to please her I took what I approved. I halted two days at this place.

In his memoirs, Jahangir mentions this place at another time also. Nur Jahan's Serai was quite famous during those times and "Serai Noor Mahal" in local usage came to mean some spacious and important edifice.

== Protected monument ==
The sarai is remarkable specimen of oriental architecture. Nurmahal Sarai is perhaps the only known monument in Jalandhar. This historical monument is now looked after by the Archaeological Survey of India.

== See also ==
- Tourism in Punjab, India
