= Shah Abbasi Caravanserai, Farasfaj =

Caravanserai in Farasfaj, Iranian national heritage site

Shah Abbasi Caravansarai
- کاروانسرای شاه‌عباسی
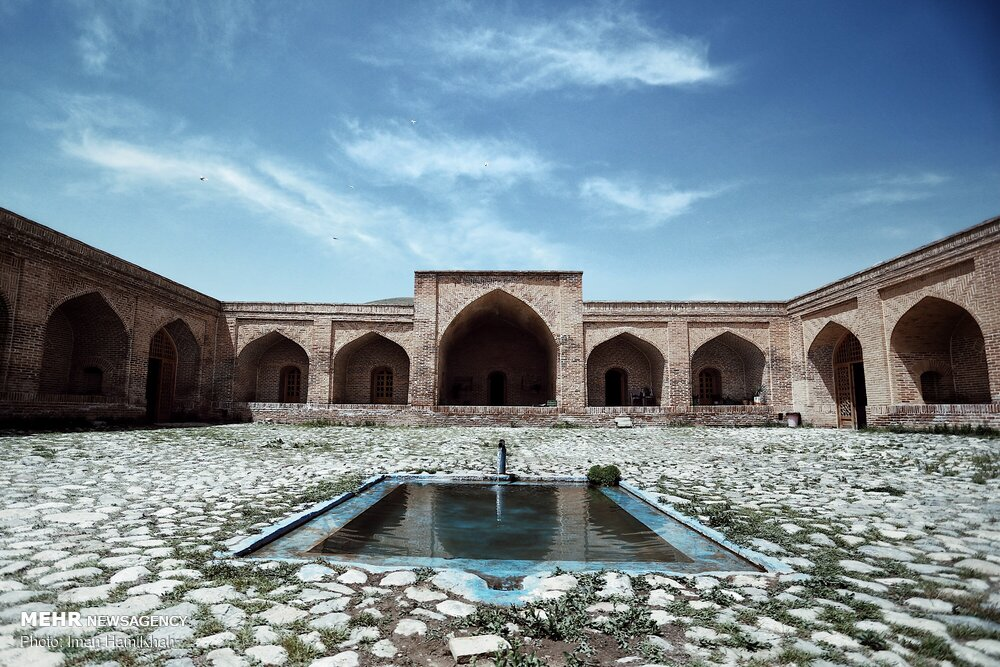
- Interactive map of the Shah Abbasi Caravansarai area

General information
- Type: Caravanserai
- Architectural style: Safavid style
- Location: Farasfaj, Hamadan Province, Iran

The Shah Abbasi Caravansarai (Persian: کاروانسرای شاه‌عباسی) is a historic caravanserai from the Safavid era and is located in Farasfaj, Iran.
