= Khanlig Mukhtar caravanserai =

Coordinates: 39°45′47″N 46°45′03″E

- Interactive map of Khanlig Mukhtar caravanserai
- Location: Shusha, Azerbaijan

History
- Built: 18th century

Khanlig Mukhtar caravanserai (Azerbaijani: Xanlıq Muxtar karvansarası, Persian: کاروانسرای خانلیق مختار) is a nationally important caravanserai belonging to the Shusha State Historical-Architectural Reserve, located at 29 M.F. Akhundov Street, Shusha. The caravansary was registered by the Ministry of Culture and Tourism of the Azerbaijan Republic as a historical and cultural monument of national importance.

== History ==
The caravanserai was built in the city of Shusha in the 18th century by Khanlig Mukhtar. Although there is not much written information about Khanlig Mukhtar in history, it is known that he served in the Khan's palace and was one of the respected people of the city.

Near the end of the 19th century, one of the 10 caravansary operating in Shusha was the Khanlig Mukhtar caravanserai. After the city came under Armenian control in 1992, the Islamic elements and Arabic inscriptions in the caravanserai were replaced by Armenian crosses and inscriptions.
