= Shah Abbasi Caravansarai, Bisotun =

UNESCO World Heritage Site in Iran

Shah Abbasi Caravansarai
- کاروانسرای شاه عباسی (Persian)
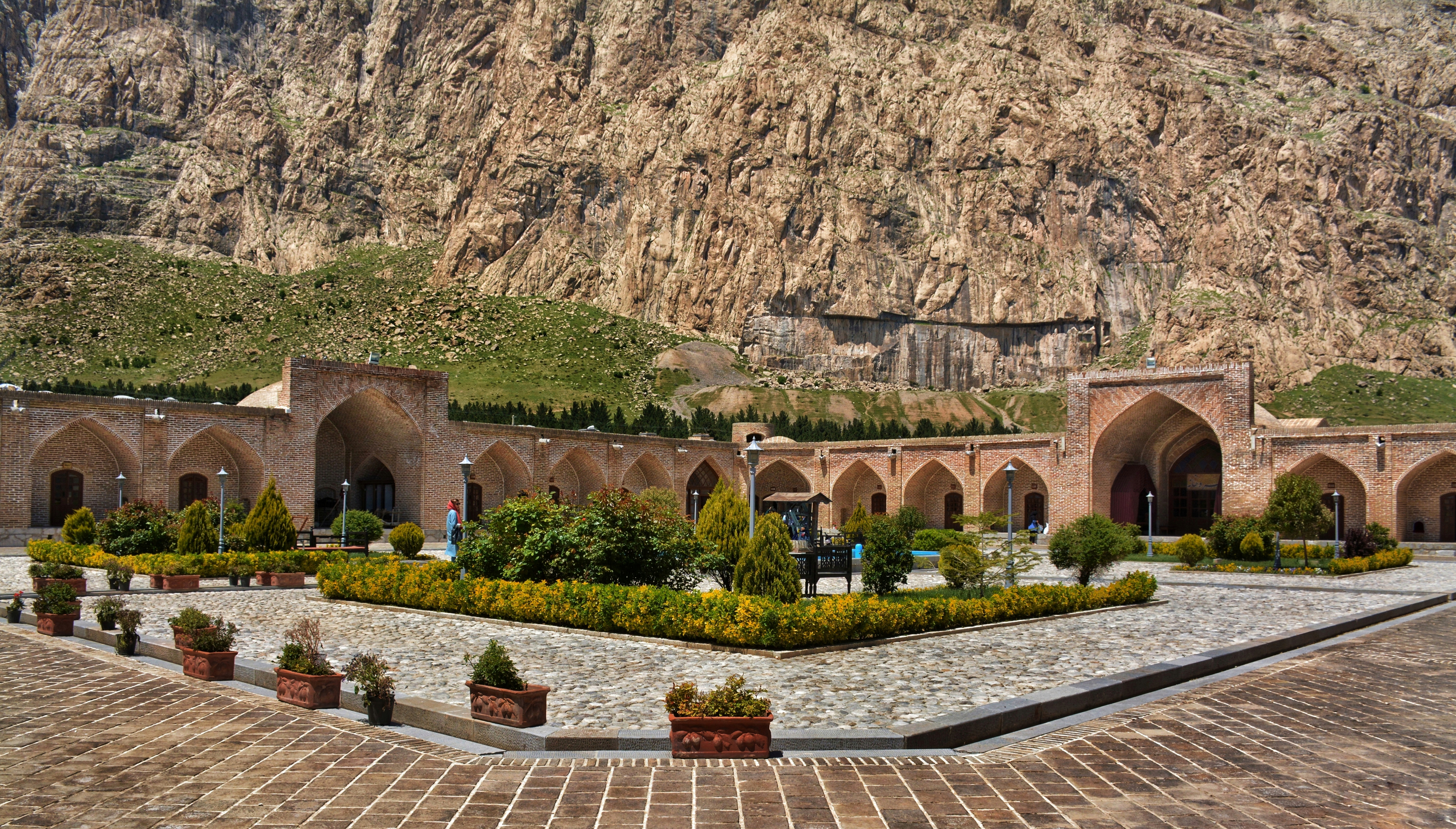
- The courtyard of the caravanserai
- Interactive map of Shah Abbasi Caravansarai
- 34.3844°N 47.4349°E
- Type: Caravanserai
- Location: Bisotun, Kermanshah province, Iran

History
- Built: Safavid era

UNESCO World Heritage Site
- Type: Cultural
- Designated: 2023
- Part of: The Persian Caravanserai
- Reference no.: 1668-032

The Shah Abbasi Caravansarai is a historic caravanserai located in Bisotun, Kermanshah province, Iran. This caravanserai was listed as an Iranian national heritage site on 4 August 1974.

== Gallery ==
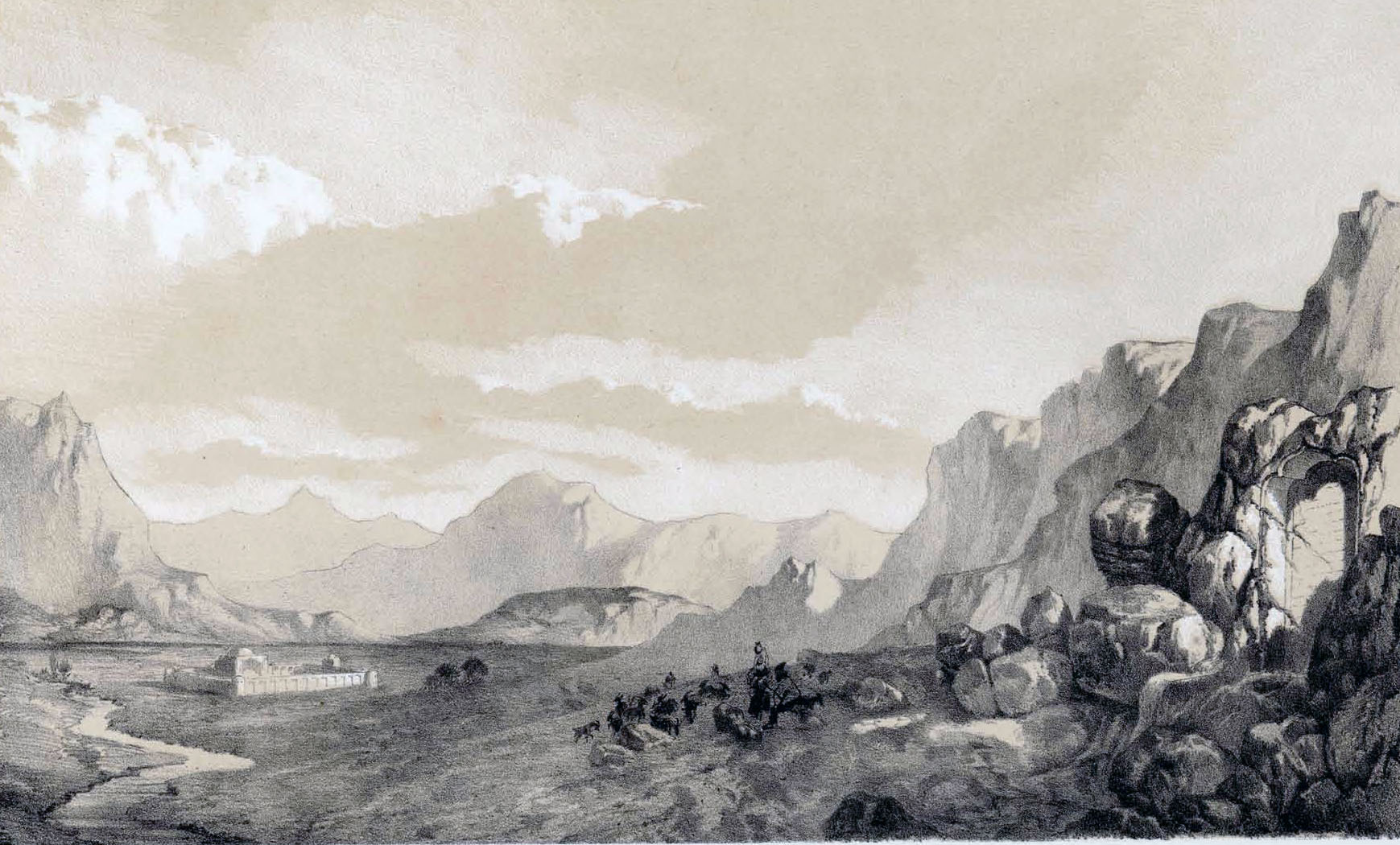
Illustration of the caravanserai by Eugène Flandin, 1840

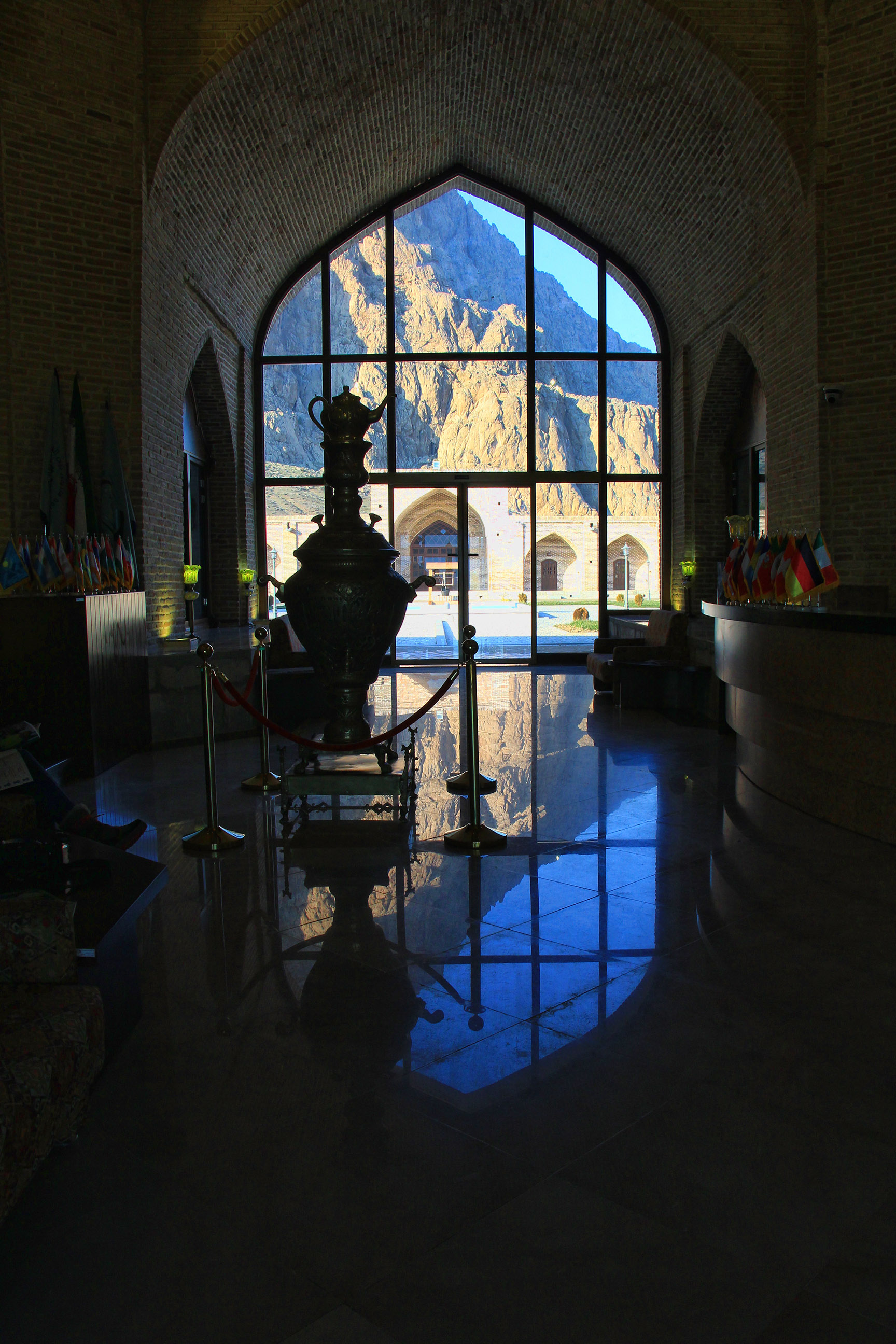
Interior of the caravanserai

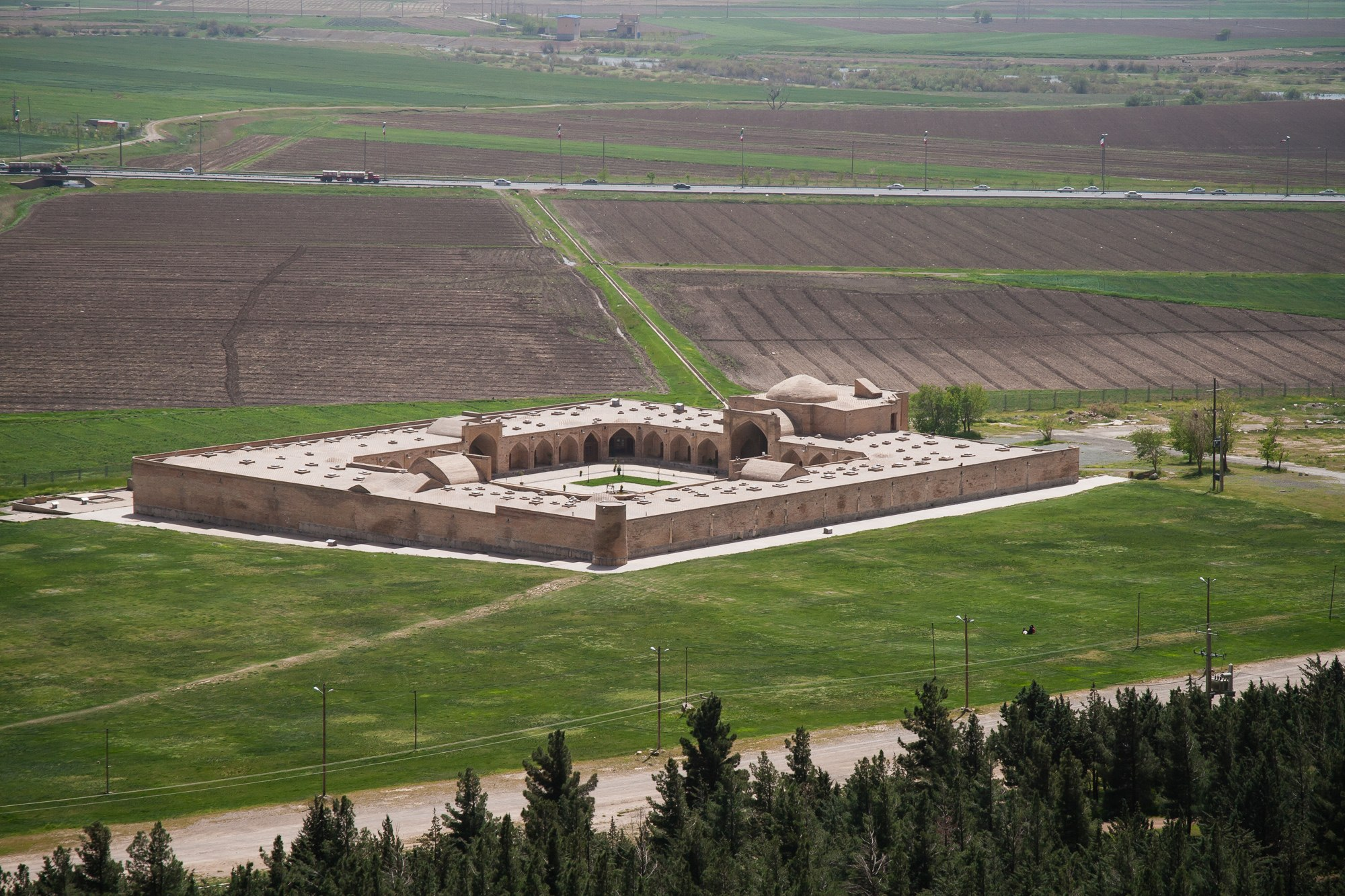
The caravanserai from afar

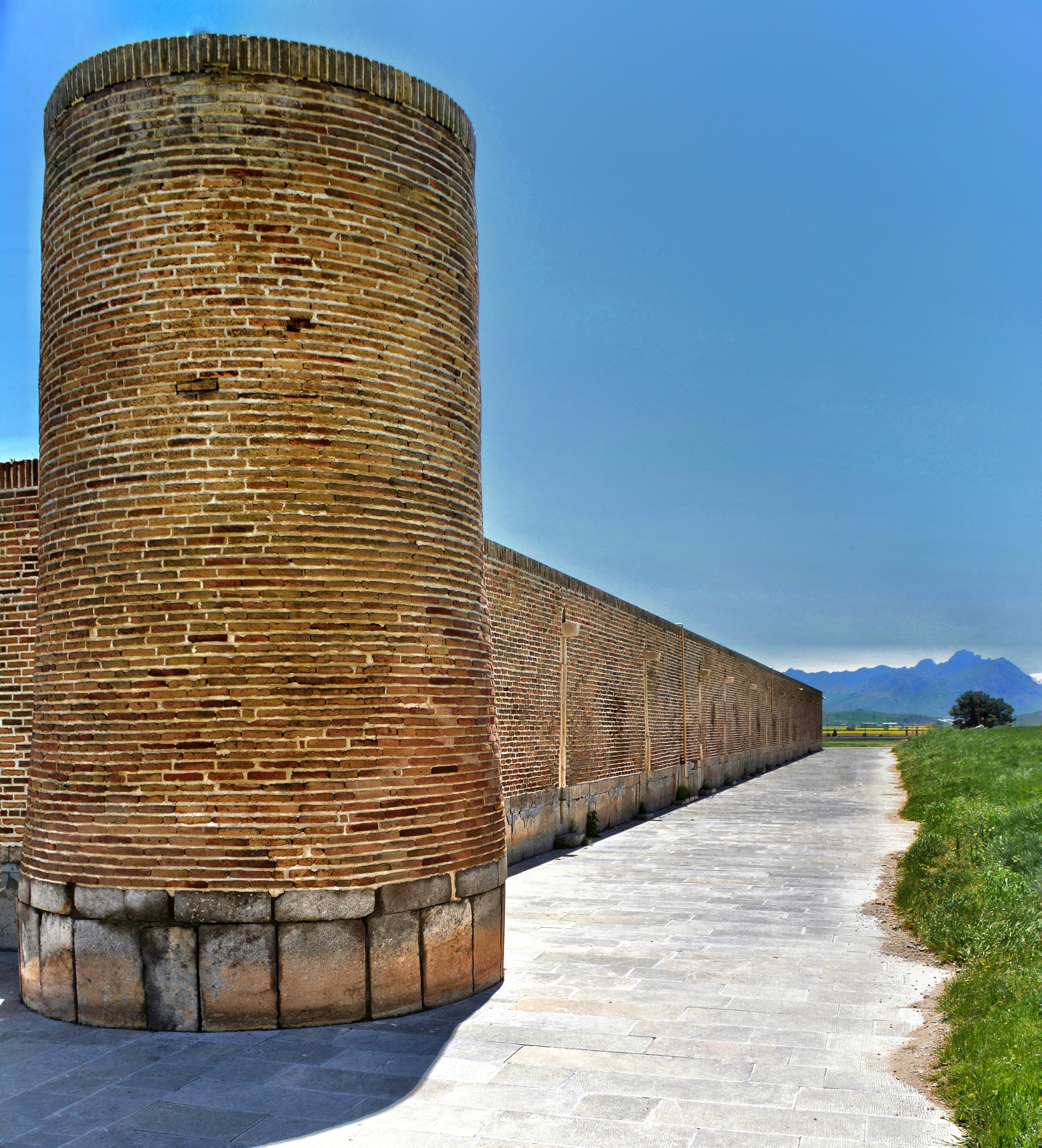
The outer walls of the caravanserai
