= Shah Abbasi Caravansarai, Ray =

Caravanserai in Ray, Iran

Shah Abbasi Caravansarai
- کاروانسرای شاه‌عباسی
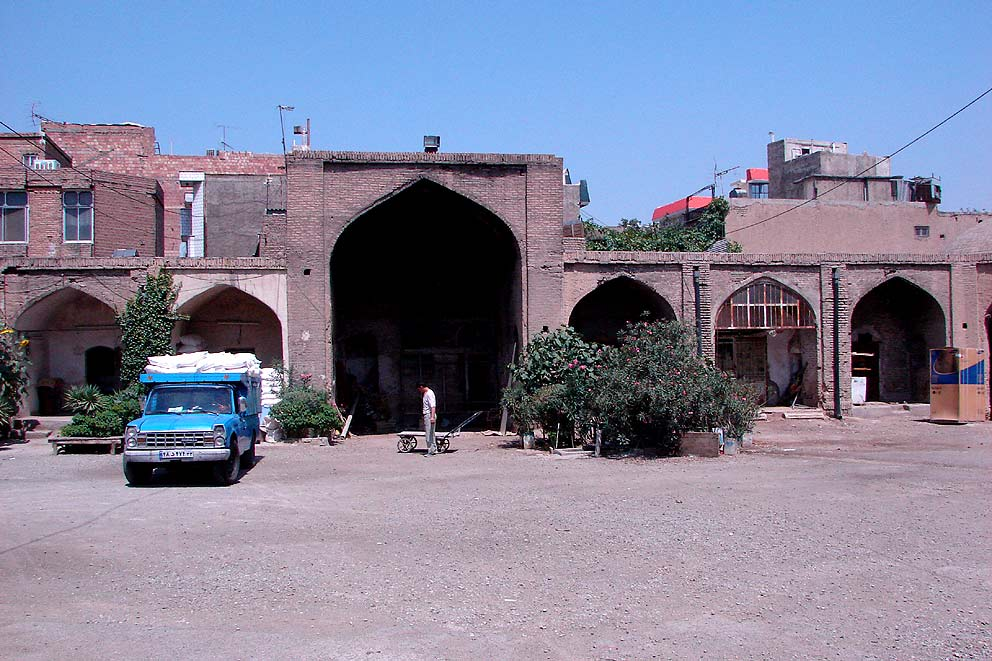
- Interactive map of the Shah Abbasi Caravansarai area

General information
- Type: Caravanserai
- Architectural style: Safavid style
- Location: Ray, Tehran Province, Iran
- Coordinates: 35°35′20″N 51°26′13″E

The Shah Abbasi Caravansarai (Persian: کاروانسرای شاه‌عباسی) is a historic caravanserai from the Safavid era and located in Ray, Iran.
