= Suluhan =

Historical caravanserai in Ankara, Turkey

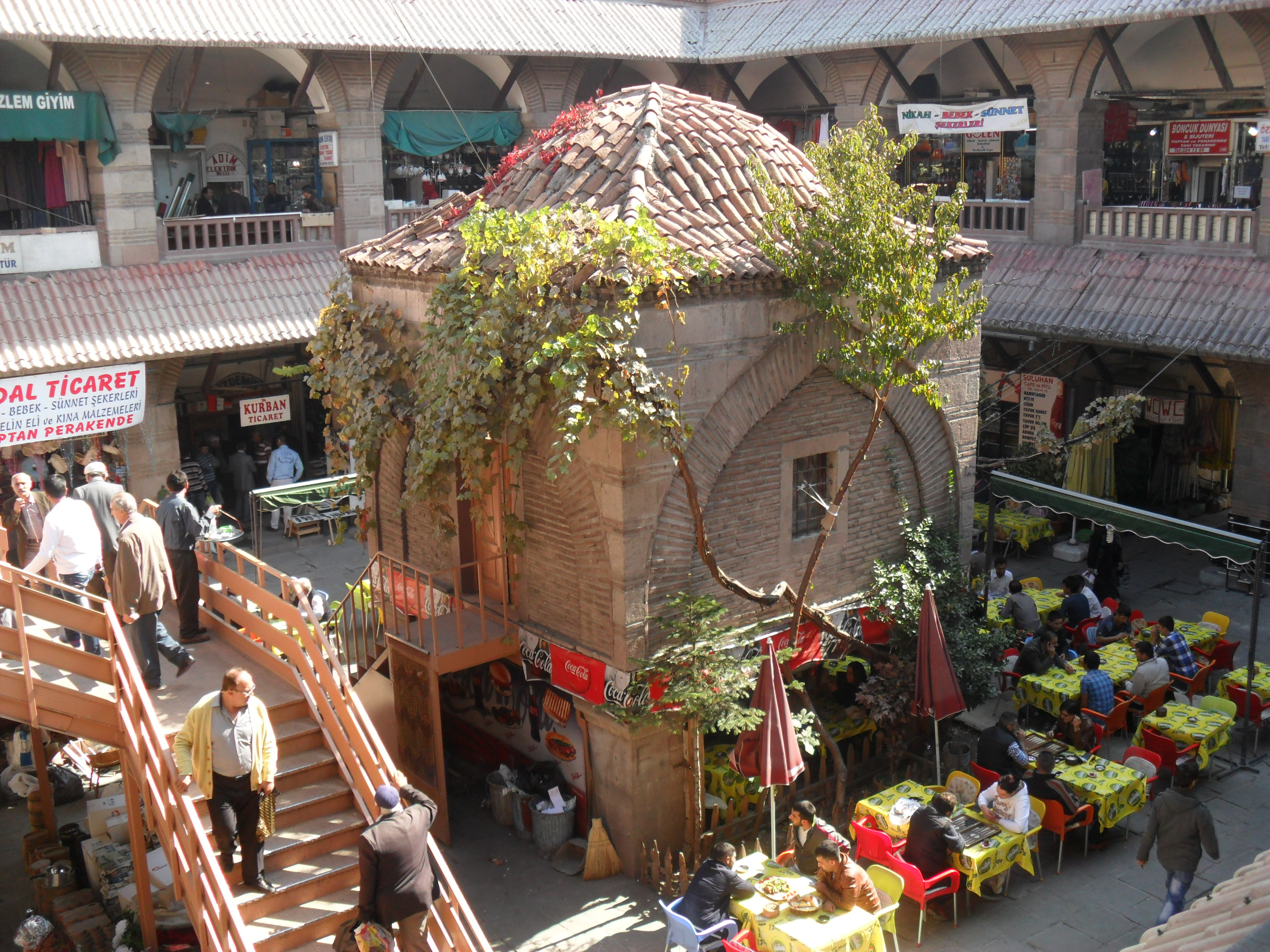
Köşk Mescit in Suluhan caravanserai, Ankara.

Suluhan is a historical caravanserai (han) in Ankara, Turkey. It is also called the Hasanpaşa Han.

== Geography ==
Suluhan is at 39°56′23″N 32°51′30″E in the urban fabric of Ankara. It is about 400 metres (1,300 ft) southeast of Ulus Square and situated in Hacıdoğan, a busy neighbourhood known for its small shops and grocery stores.

== History ==
Ottoman buildings usually have a vakfiye (inscription) of endowment. According to the vakfiye of Suluhan, the building was commissioned by Hasan Pasha, a regional beylerbey, and was constructed between 1508 and 1511. According to other sources, it was commissioned by Mehmet Emin Bey, a Şeyhülislam, in 1685. The later date may be the reconstruction date. In 1929, the han was largely damaged as a result of fire. The remaining sections were used as a greengrocery marketplace. However, in 1984, a reconstruction was carried out by the General Directorate of Foundations and the han now is mainly used for tourism and leisure, with cafés and souvenir shops.

== Technical details ==
The building material is mostly rubble stone and partially facade stone. The roof is covered with domestic tiles. The two-storey han has two yards. The yard in the north is square-shaped, while the yard in the south is rhombic. The total area is more than 2,500 square metres (27,000 sq ft). There are 102 rooms (now shops) which face the two yards. In each room there is a window, a niche and a chimney.

== Köşk Mescit ==
Mescit means little mosque in Turkish. Köşk Mescit is in the middle of the northern yard and its gate faces north.
