= Small Caravanserai =

Small caravanserai
- Azerbaijani: Kiçik karvansaray
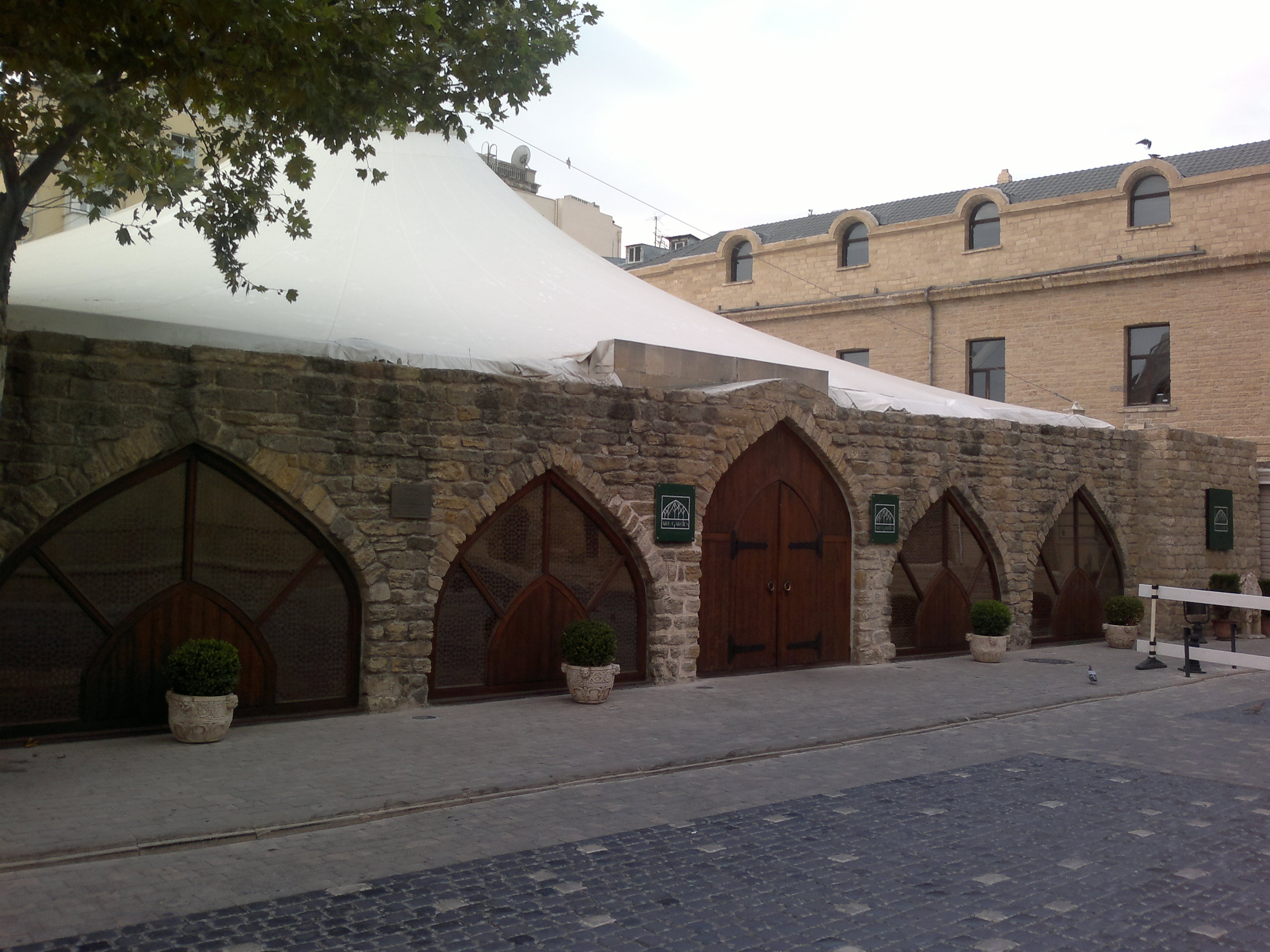

- Location within Azerbaijan

General information
- Status: Restaurant
- Type: Mausoleum
- Architectural style: Architectural school of Shirvan-Absheron
- Location: Hagigat Rzayeva Street, Baku, Azerbaijan
- Coordinates: 40°27′49″N 49°55′12″E
- Completed: Late 15th – early 16th centuries

Technical details
- Material: Stone

The Small Caravanserai in Baku, Azerbaijan has a square shape and an inner quadrangular courtyard with cut corners. This caravanserai was built in the 12th century. There is a long balcony which surrounds the building of the caravanserai. The north and south entrances of the caravanserai are portal-shaped. During the Middle Ages, there was a main entrance from the sea. The caravanserai has a defensive construction and two floors on the southern side.

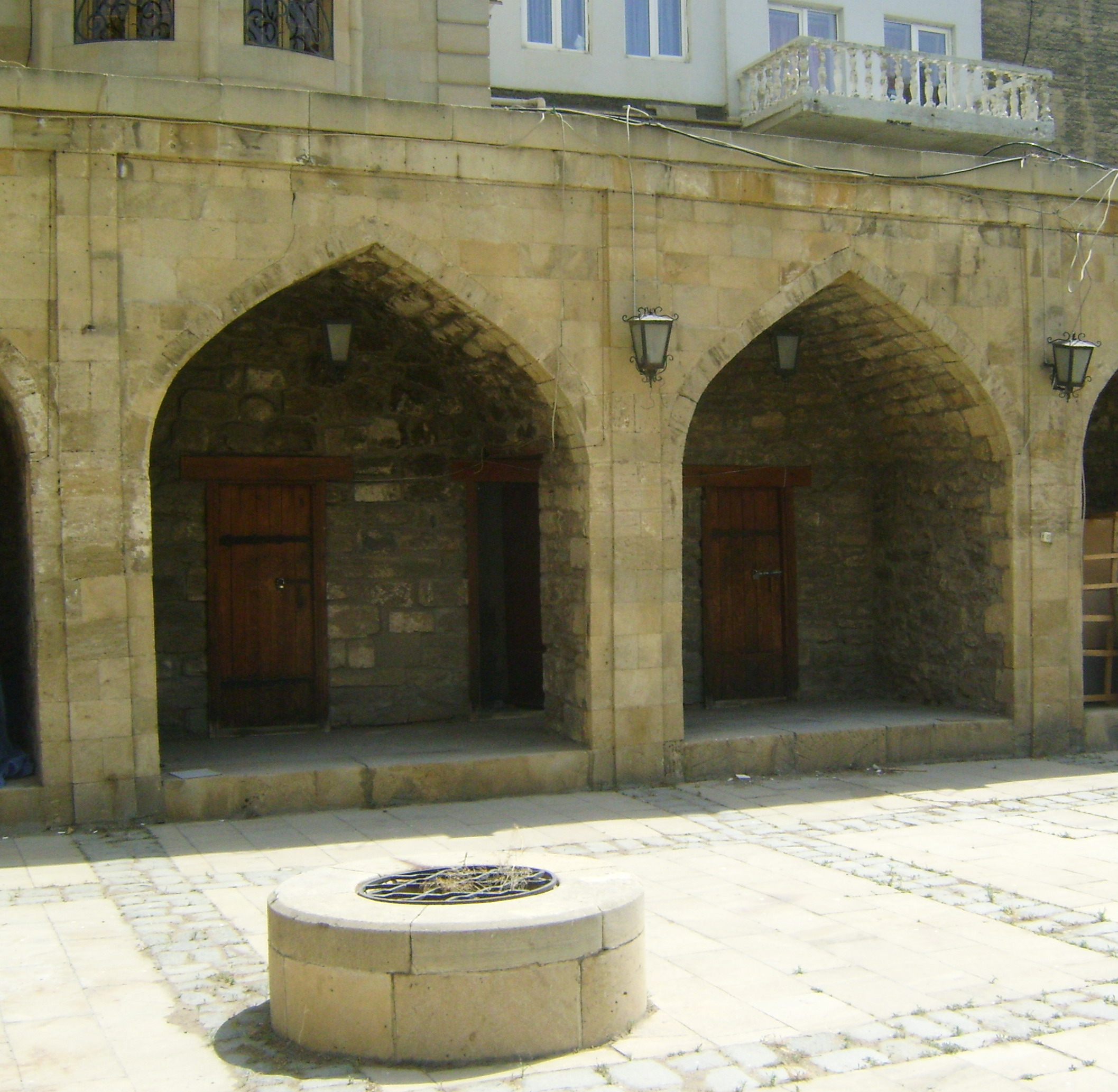
Small caravanserai, old city of Baku, Azerbaijan 17th century

It is a monument of national importance. The caravanserai consisted of counters from the shopping street that did not have direct communication with the courtyard. However, it is believed that there used to be a functioning Madrasah nearby which was part of the Jameh (Juma) complex and the rooms of the caravanserai were considered for students studying in Madrasah.

The caravanserai now features an "Art garden" which includes art galleries, several workshops of artisans and a restaurant of both national and European cuisines. Each room of the monument has been decorated by a different Azerbaijani artist.
