= Dayr-e Gachin =

UNESCO World Heritage Site in Iran

UNESCO World Heritage Site
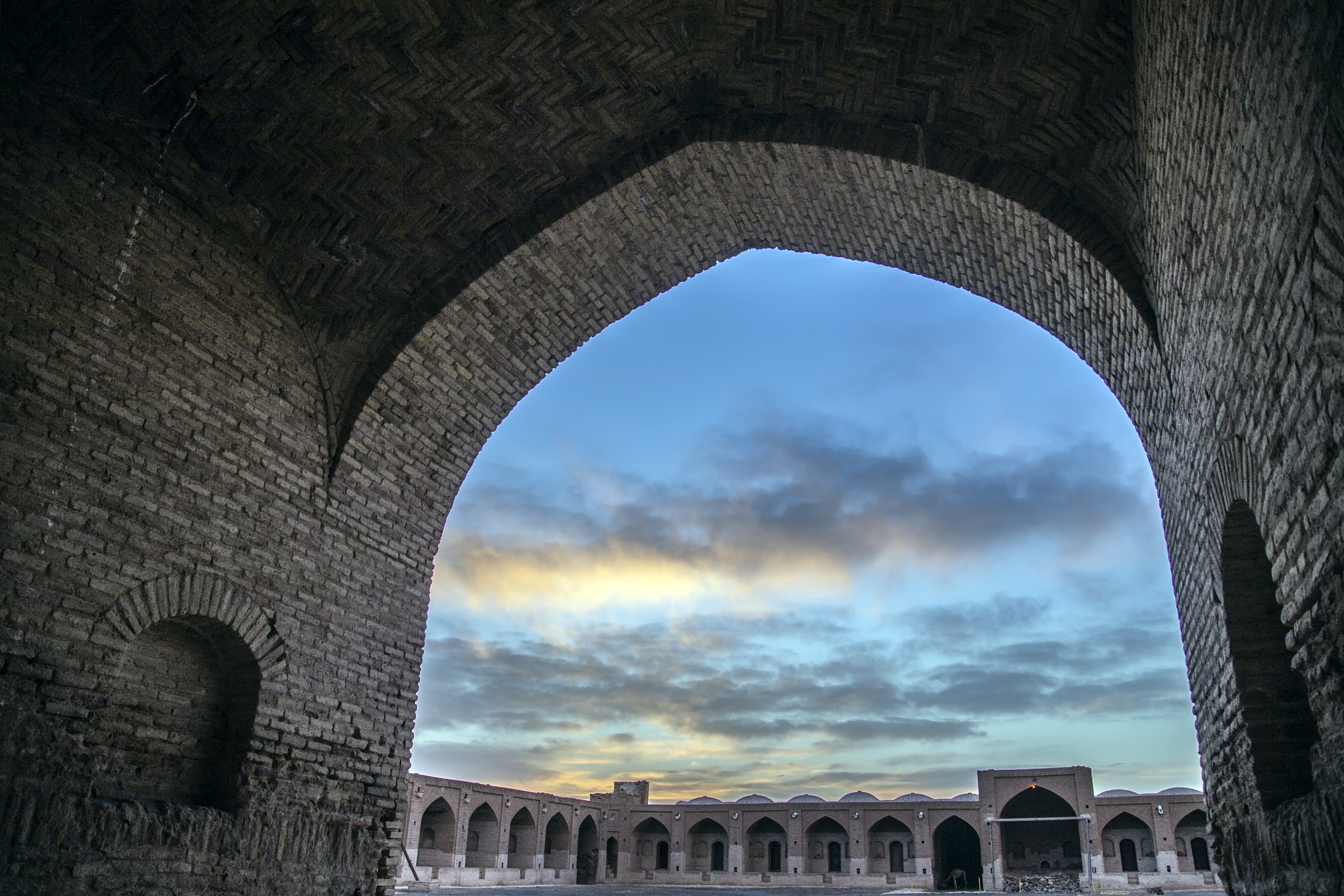
- Interactive map of Dayr-e Gachin
- Location: Qom
- Part of: The Persian Caravanserai
- Criteria: Cultural: ii, iii
- Reference: 1668-001
- Inscription: 2023 (45th Session)
- Coordinates: 35.0583°N 51.4202°E

Deir-e Gachin Caravanserai (Persian: کاروانسرای دیر گچین) is a historic caravansarai in Iran, located in the center of Kavir National Park. Due to its historical significance and unique features, it is sometimes called the "Mother of Iranian Caravanserais." Situated in the Central District of Qom County, it lies 80 kilometers northeast of Qom (60 kilometers along the Garmsar Freeway) and 35 kilometers southwest of Varamin. This monument was added to Iran's National Heritage List on 23 September 2003. Along with 53 other sarais, Dayr-e Gachin was registered as The Persian Caravanserai of World Heritage Sites in 2023.

Originally built during the Sasanian era, the caravanserai underwent restorations and reconstructions during the Seljuk, Safavid, and Qajar eras. Its current form dates back to the Safavid era. Deir-e Gachin Caravanserai is located on the ancient route from Ray to Isfahan.

The structure of this caravanserai follows the Persian four-iwan design and spans an area of 12,000 square meters. The interior spaces include dedicated areas for people, livestock, services, convenience, and security. The caravanserai features four circular towers at each corner and two half-oval towers on either side of the main gate, which is located at the center of the southern wall. Inside, there are 44 rooms or chambers, four large halls (stables), a mosque, a private shabestan, a fodder barn, a gristmill, and bathroom facilities.

The materials used in constructing Deir-e Gachin include brick, lime, adobe, and plaster. The mosque of the caravanserai likely occupies the site of a former Sasanian fire temple and has no decorative elements. Surrounding the caravanserai are various structures, including two ab anbars (water reservoirs) near the bathroom on the western side, a brick furnace, a dam, and a graveyard to the southwest with graves covered in bricks, dating back to the Islamic era.

Additionally, there is a brick-and-clay fort-like structure approximately 500 meters east of the caravanserai, featuring a single entrance gate, and dating back to the Qajar era.

== Etymology ==
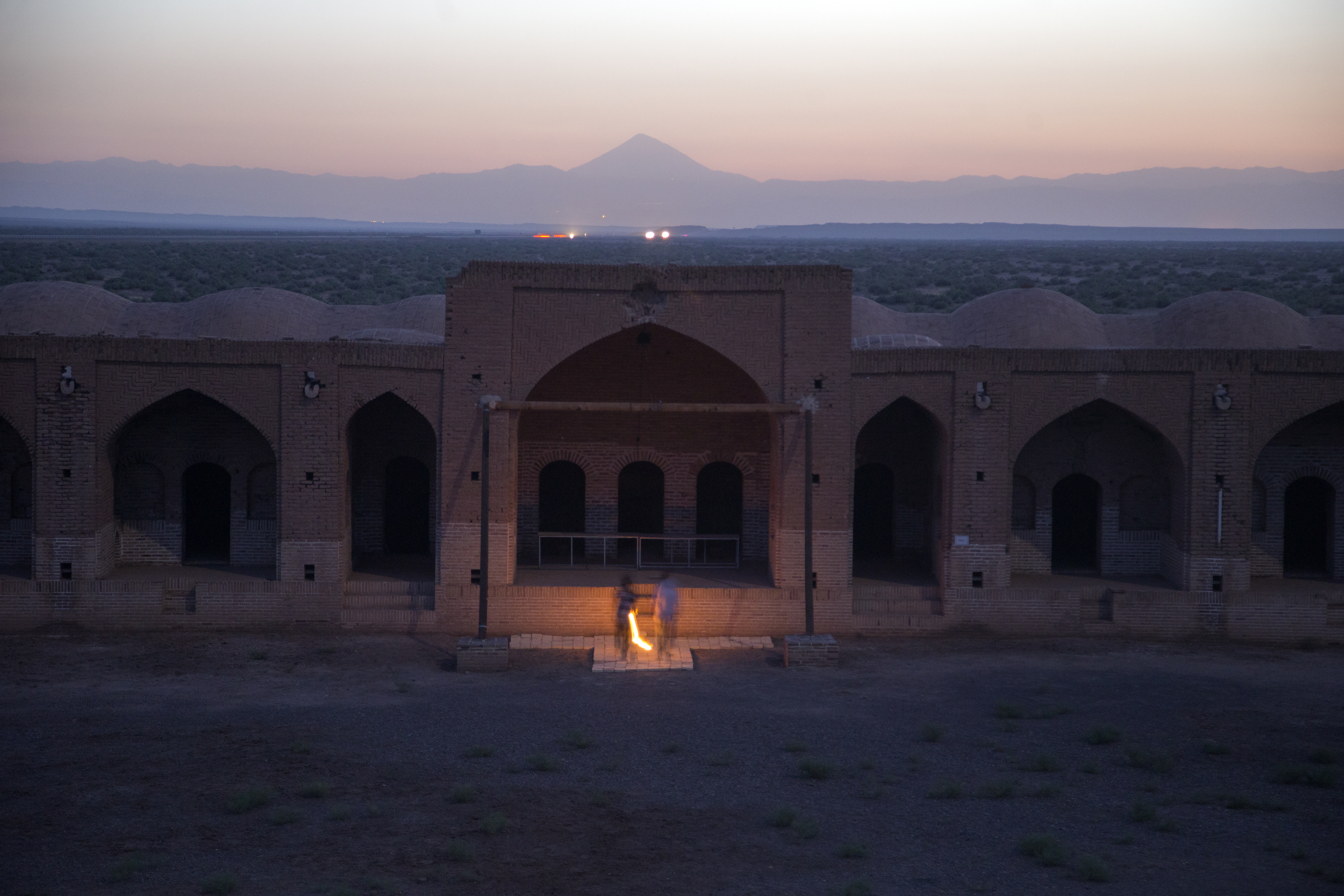
The gate, 2017

In Middle Persian (Pahlavi), the word deir, as noted by Shams Gheis-e Razi in the Shams Gheis Dictionary, refers to a gonbad in Persian (or dome in English), built for prayer. The structure was named Deir-e Gachin because it originally featured a dome made of plaster (gach). However, today, no such dome remains in the structure.

== History ==
The construction of this structure is attributed to Ardashir-e Babakan (Ardashir I), which is why it has also been referred to as Kardashir (meaning "done by Ardashir"). However, historian Ya'qubi attributes the structure to Anushiruwan (Khosrow I). In The History of Qom by Hasan ibn Mohammad Qomi, it is similarly attributed to Anushiruwan, though the text suggests he did not build the original structure. It is likely that the structure was initially built at the beginning of the Sasanian era (under Ardashir I) and was later rebuilt during Anushiruwan's reign.

According to Qomi, the king of Rûm sent a group of Amalek—the last of the ʿĀd tribe, known for their great stature—to Anushiruwan to serve him, and he appointed them to construct this structure.

After the Sasanian era, the caravanserai underwent significant restoration and reconstruction on at least two occasions. During the reign of the Seljuk Sultan Sanjar (r. 1118–1157), the vizier Abu Nasr Ahmad Kashi repaired the road from Ray to Qom and restored the caravanserai. He established an endowment (waqf) funded by revenues from the nearby village of Kaj, specifically for the caravanserai's maintenance.

In the Safavid era, the structure was restored again. Many of its vaults were rebuilt with smaller, new bricks, while numerous older Sasanian bricks were reused in other buildings.

In 2024, Parastoo Ahmadi, not wearing the compulsary hijab, broadcast her performance of the Caravanserai Concert at Deyr-e Gachin live on her YouTube channel and garnered widespread attention. For this, she was sentenced to 74 lashes by an Iranian criminal court.

== Location and importance ==
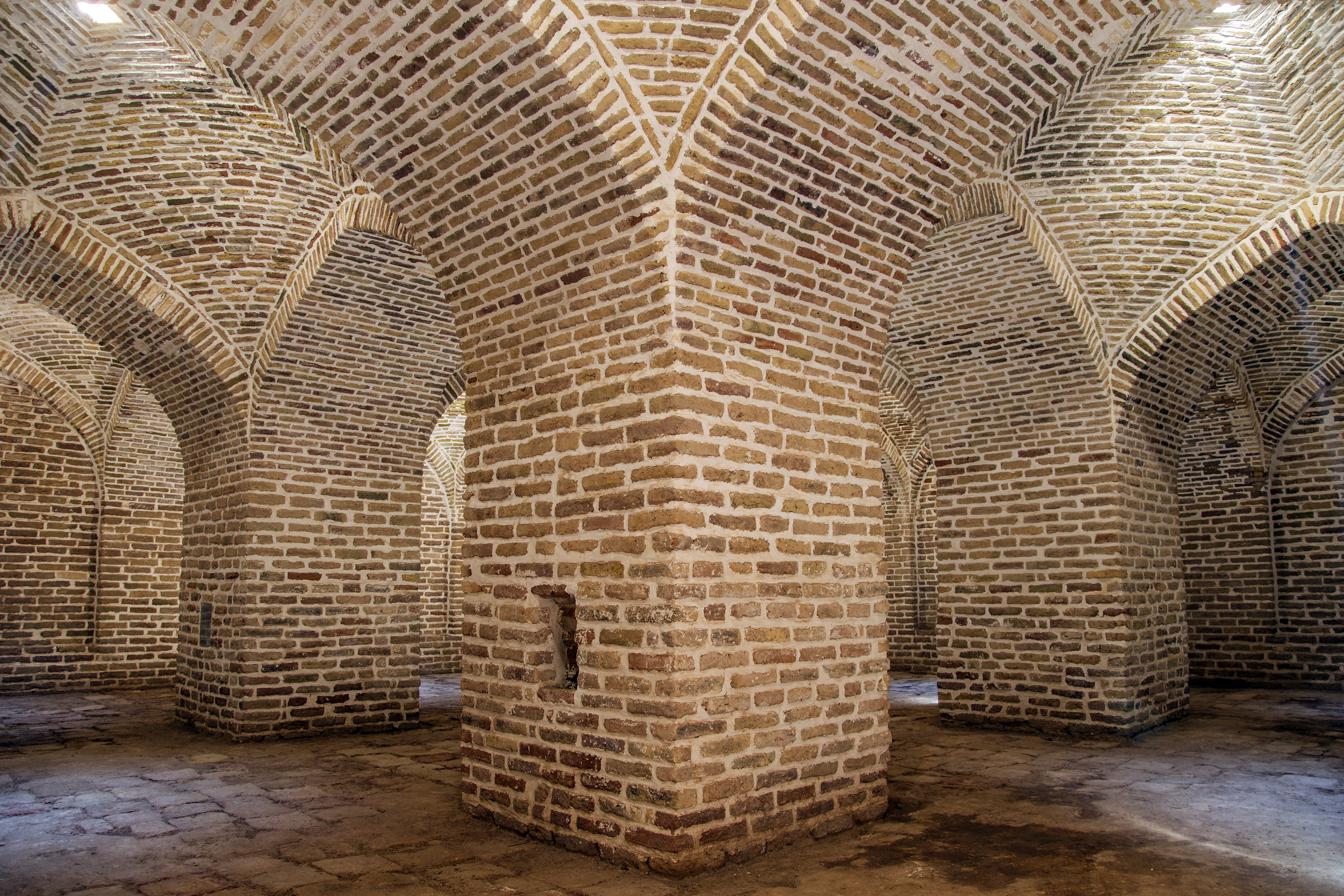
The interior, 2018

Deir-e Gachin Caravanserai, one of the largest caravansarais in Iran, is located in the center of Kavir National Park. Its unique features have earned it the title of the "Mother of Iranian Caravanserais."

For centuries, Deir-e Gachin's location on the ancient route from Ray to Isfahan has served as a central hub where connecting routes between the east and west intersected. The northern, western, southern, and eastern routes to Ray all passed through this spot. During the Median and Achaemenid eras, this location connected the eastern, northern, southern, and western regions, giving it strategic defensive importance. In the Seleucid, Parthian, and Sasanian eras, the site’s commercial significance also grew.

Deir-e Gachin was part of the Silk Road, extending from Ctesiphon to Balkh, Samarkand, and Bukhara. This route began in the Chinese capital (Xi'an) and continued through Hotan and Kashgar, reaching Ray and Deir-e Gachin. From there, it traveled through Saveh or Qazvin to Kermanshah and Hamadan, then on to Ctesiphon and Babylon, before continuing to Antakya on the Mediterranean coast.

== Structure ==
The structure plan

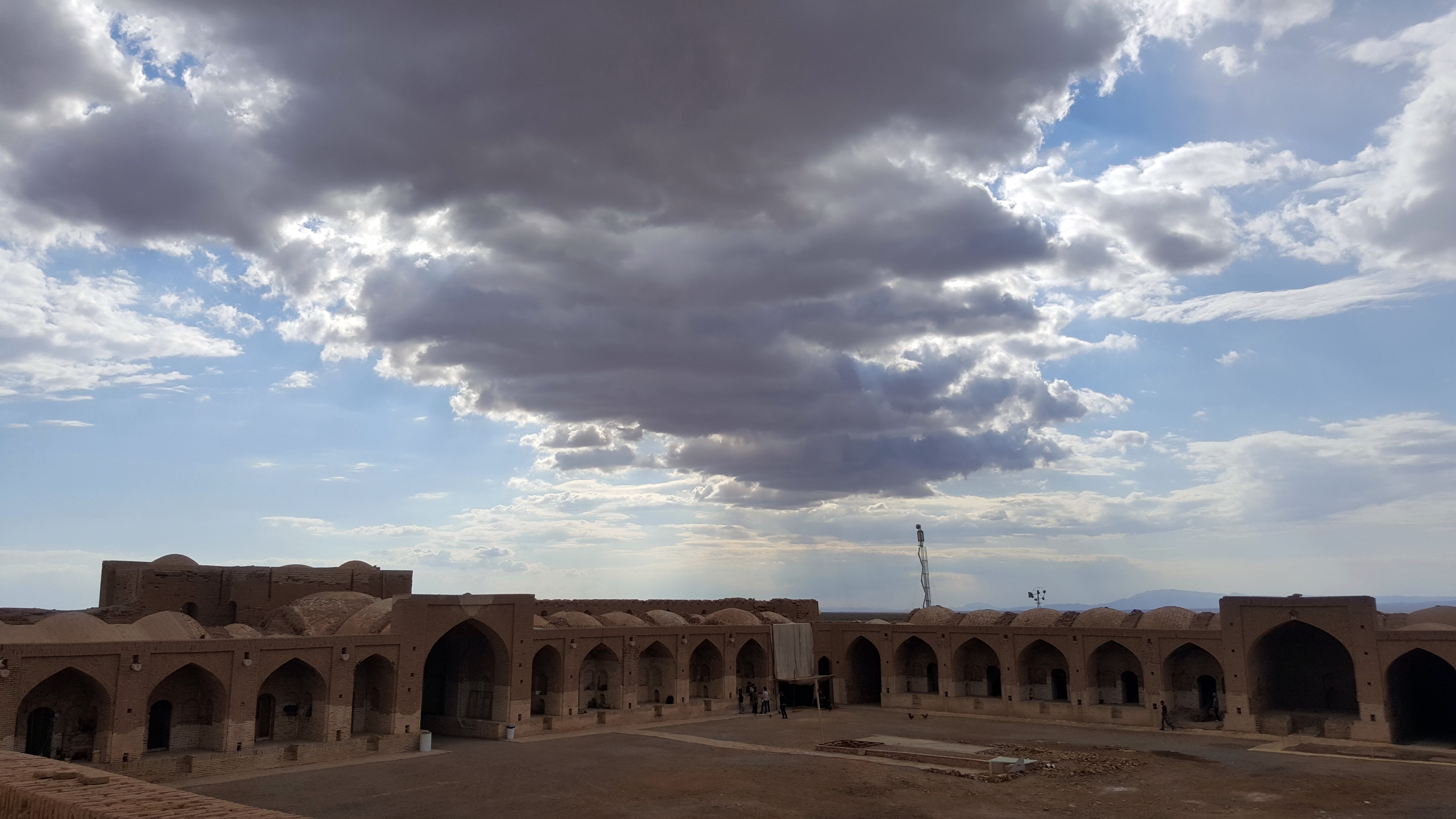
Interior view of the southern and western side of the yard of Deir-e Gachin Caravansarai, 2018

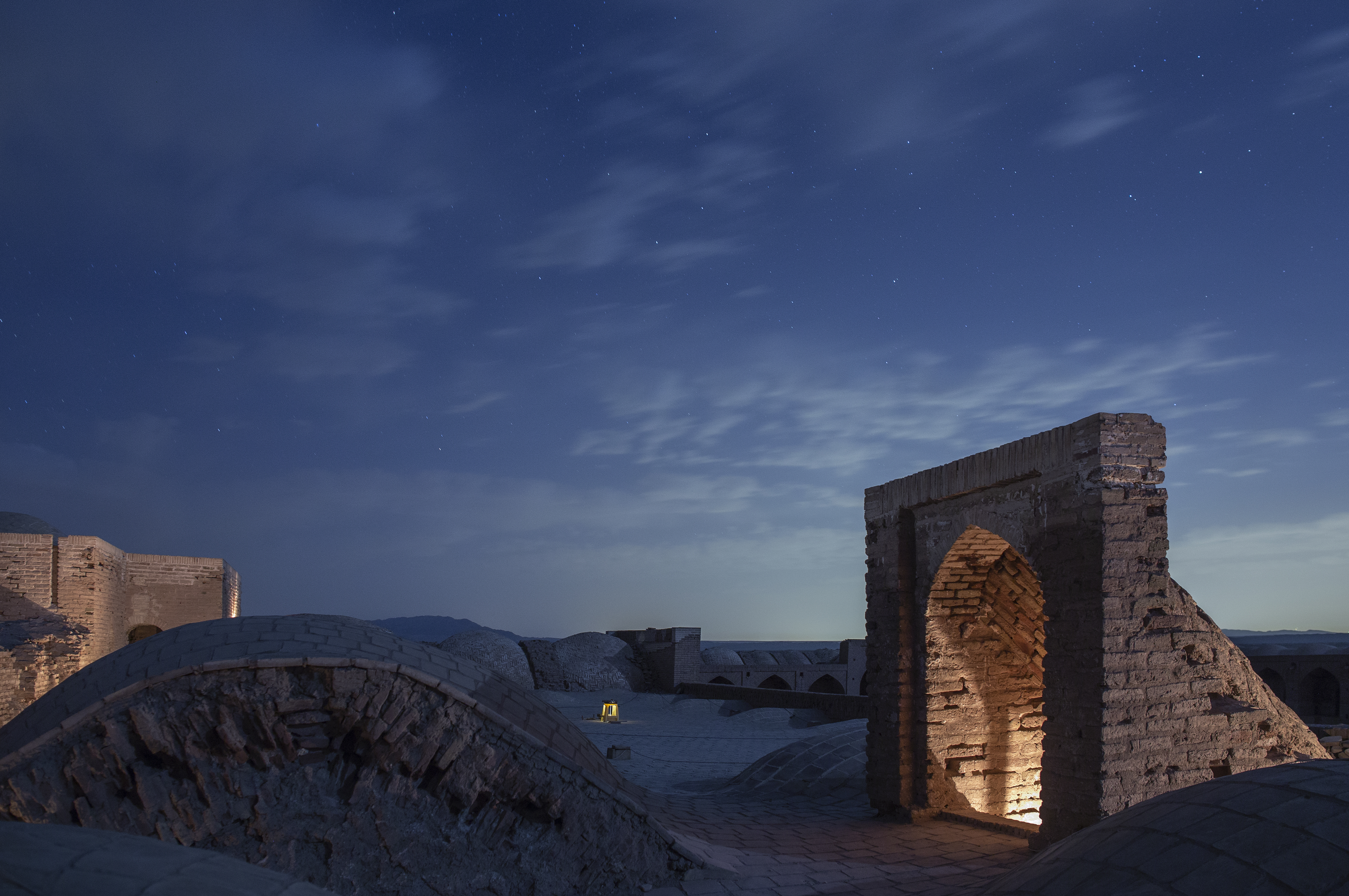
View from rooftop at night, 2018

The structure of the caravanserai measures 109 by 108 meters (approximately 12,000 square meters) and features four circular towers at the corners, along with two half-oval towers on either side of the main entrance, located in the middle of the southern wall. The architecture follows a four-iwan design, which includes 44 rooms or chambers, four large halls (stables), a mosque, a private shabestan, a fodder barn, a gristmill, and bathroom facilities.

The materials used in Deir-e Gachin include brick, lime, adobe, and plaster. Rock is utilized only in the gristmill, the mihrab of the mosque, and the upper part of the now-nonexistent gate. Wood is not used in this structure, and the chambers lack doors and windows; however, it is presumed that the gate, which no longer exists, was made of wood.

The exterior walls are more than three meters thick, making them resistant to natural dangers and disasters. The interior courtyard measures 69 square meters, with an iwan on each side and 10 chambers (rooms). Each chamber features a small iwan, approximately 1 to 1.5 meters high, designed for the convenience of loading and unloading passengers' luggage, as well as enhancing the interior view of the structure.

In the square layout of this caravanserai, the fixed elements, such as the chambers and main iwans, are positioned along the sides next to each other, while the movable elements are located in the four corners of the square and at the midpoints of the sides. The main gate is situated in the middle of the southern side, with iwans or shahneshins at the center of the remaining sides. Service spaces are located in the four corners of the structure: the mosque is in the right corner of the southern side, the private shabestan in the right corner of the northern side, the bathroom in the left corner of the southern side, and the barn and gristmill in the left corner of the northern side.

The northern iwan, or shahneshin, of the structure is more spacious than the other iwans and features a lobby with three chambers at its back. Behind the chambers on each side are the stables, designed as a long corridor with arched vaults that connect to the courtyard through two exits.

=== Interior Spaces ===
==== Human Spaces ====
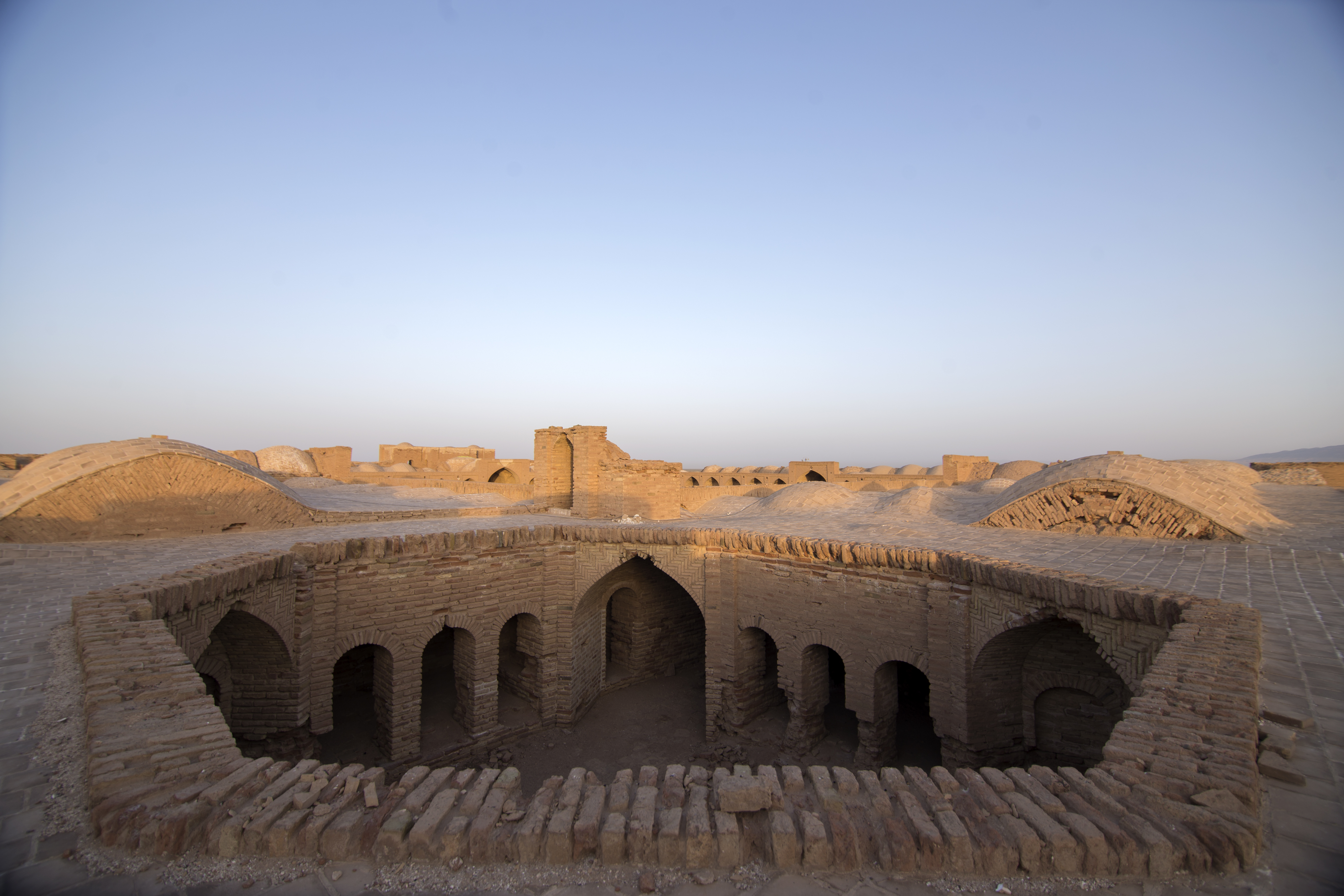
one of the small protected spaces

The caravanserai contains 44 chambers and residential rooms, which are nearly uniform in design. Each room features nine niches set one meter above the floor, and a fireplace is built into the wall opposite the entrance. The entrances to the rooms are small and arched at the top, which helps with heat retention. The rooms do not have windows leading to the stables, and each room has a small iwan (porch).

There are holes in the walls between the iwans that serve as drawbars, allowing travelers to care for their animals in front of the rooms before moving them to the stables. The walls of the iwans also have niches, similar to those in the rooms. Additionally, there are 66 iwans or small platforms within the stables for the lodging of the caravan crew. The size of these platforms varies, accommodating either one person or a group. Like the rooms, each platform is equipped with a fireplace at a convenient height from the stable floor.

==== Livestock Spaces ====
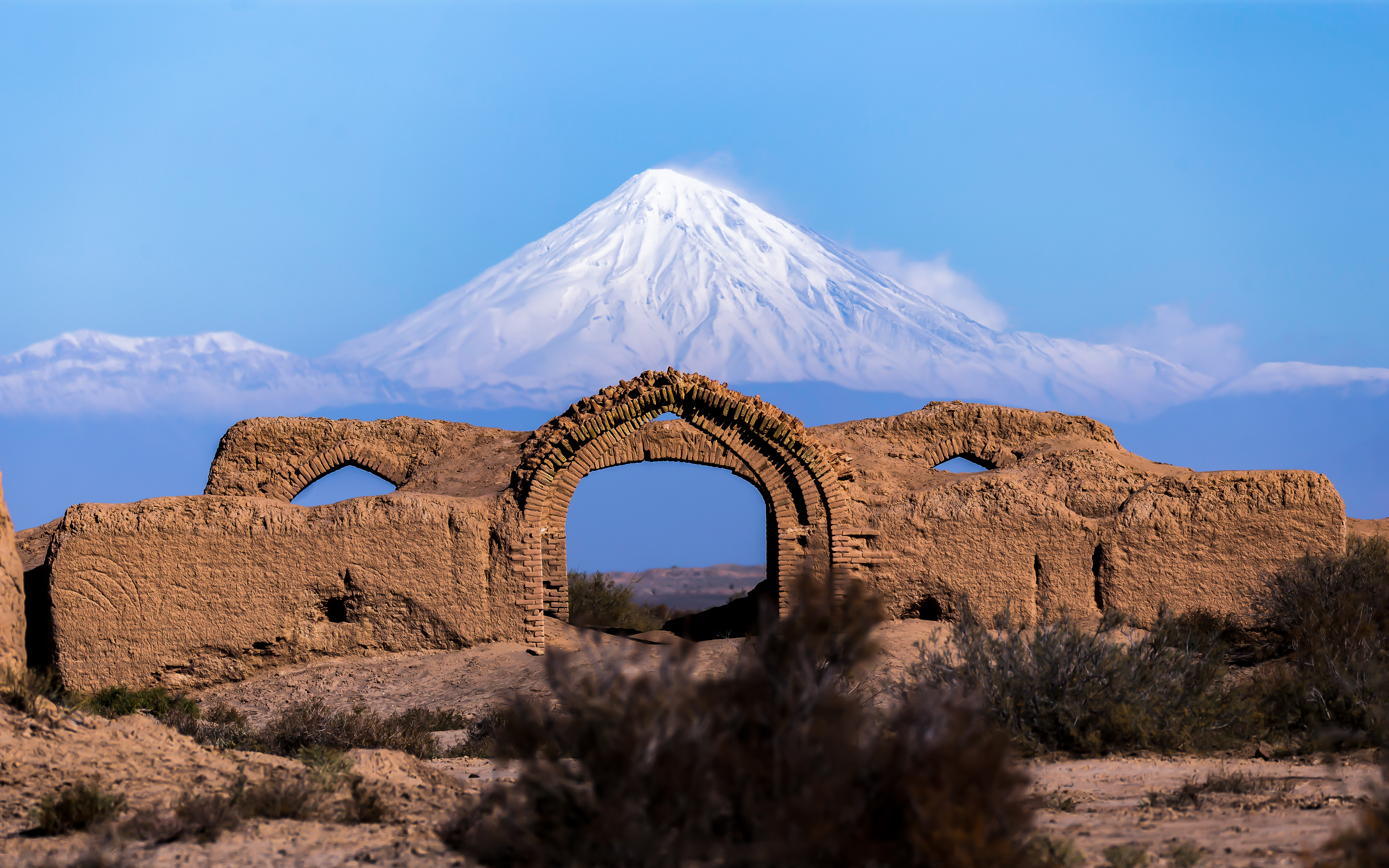
The ruined sections, 2018

The livestock spaces and stables are located behind the rooms, with L-shaped entrances designed to prevent animals from easily escaping if they run off. The stables are roofed, and natural light is provided through skylights in the ceiling. The width of the stables is sufficient for two camels with luggage to pass each other comfortably. In this caravanserai, all the animals were kept together, and there were no separate areas designated for different types of animals.

==== Service and Convenience Spaces ====
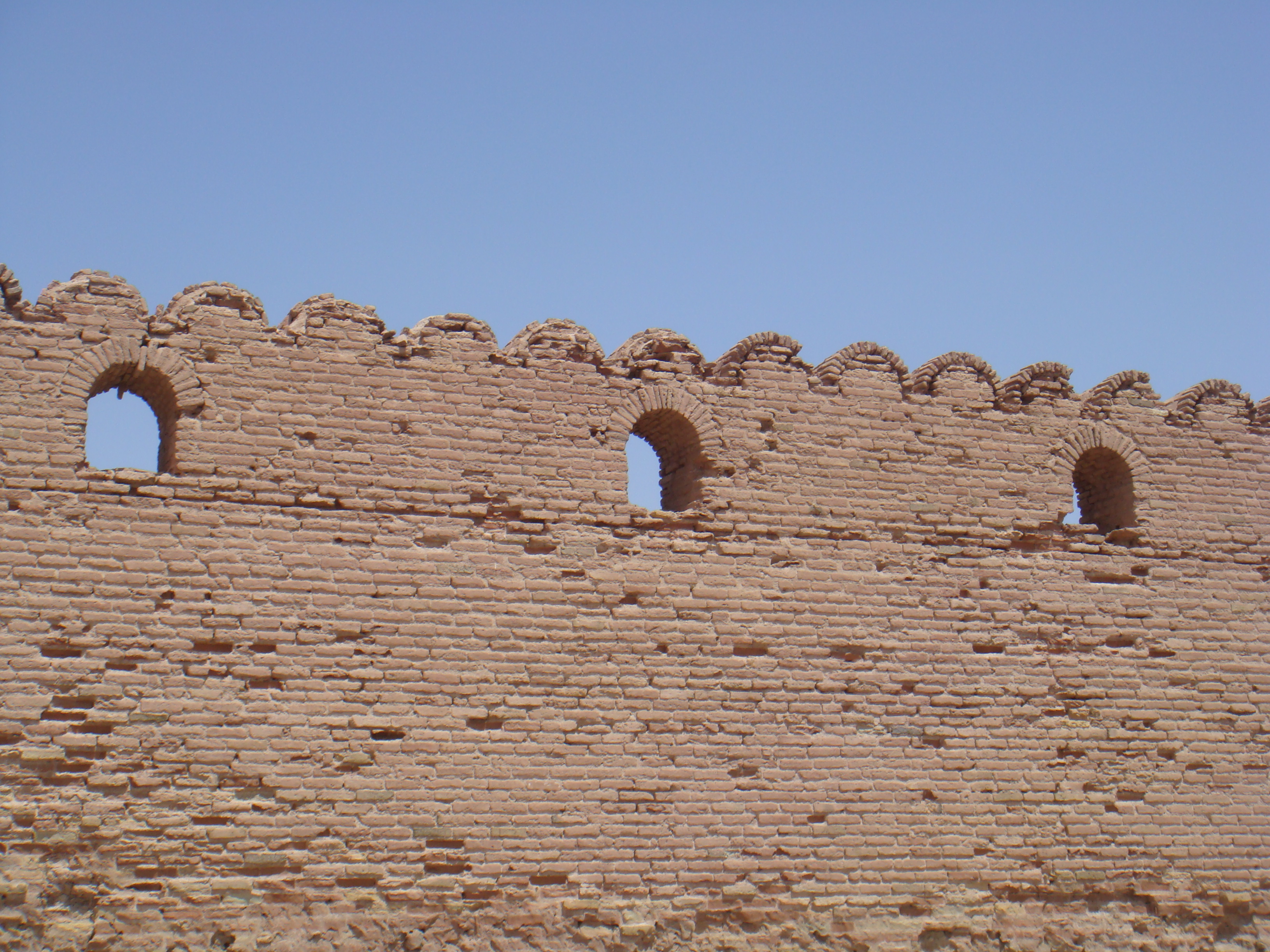
Detail of a wall, 2012

The mosque is located in the far right corner of the southern side and features four columns, each 1.5 meters high. As noted by Iranica, it was likely built on the site of a Sasanian fire temple. The mosque has no decorative elements. In the middle of the southern side, which faces the Qibla, there is a designated space for a mihrab.

The bathroom is situated in the left corner of the southern side and is as wide as the mosque. This part of the structure has experienced more erosion than the rest; the ceiling is damaged, and some of the walls have collapsed.

In the northeastern corner of the structure, there is a separate shabestan with an octagonal courtyard. This area, featuring a unique design and complete amenities, is the most aristocratic section of the caravanserai and was intended for high-ranking individuals.

==== Security Spaces ====
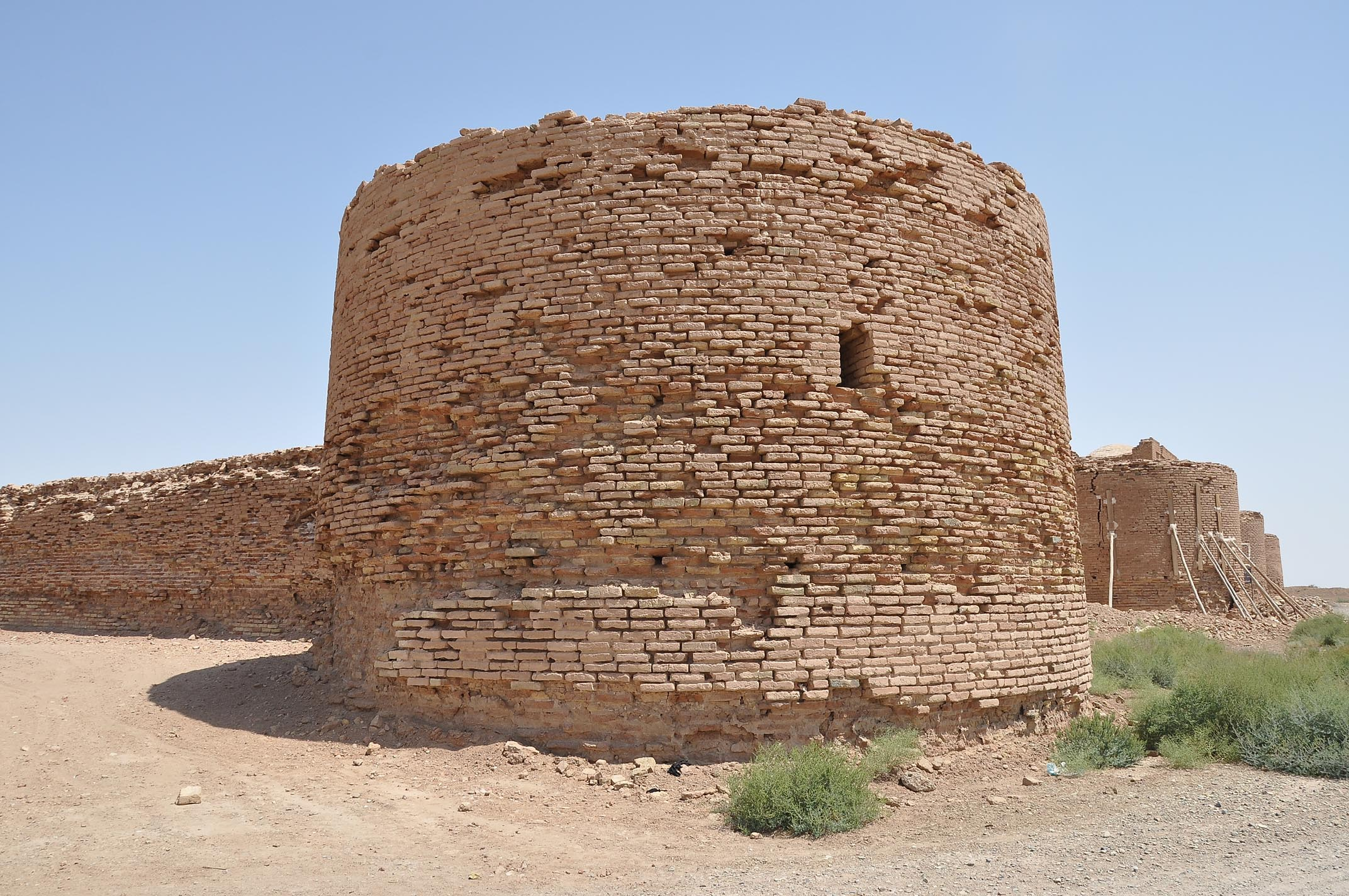
The towers

There are four large towers at each corner and two half-towers on either side of the main gate. These towers were used for both guarding the caravanserai and lighting torches to help locate it at night. As noted by the Encyclopedia of Islamic History, it can be imagined that during the Sasanian era, there were gonbads atop these four prominent towers.

=== Exterior Structures ===
There are several structures surrounding the caravanserai, forming a collection. These include two ab anbars located behind the western side and near the bathroom, a brick furnace, a dam, and a graveyard in the southwestern corner, where the graves, covered with bricks, date back to the Islamic era. Additionally, there is a brick-clay structure in the form of a fort, located 500 meters east of the caravanserai, which has only one entrance gate and dates back to the Qajar era. Most of this structure is now in ruins.

== External linkls ==
- Media related to Dayr-e Gachin at Wikimedia Commons
