= Titi Caravanserai =

UNESCO World Heritage Site in Iran

Coordinates: 37°02′41″N 49°54′08″E

- تی تی کاروانسرا
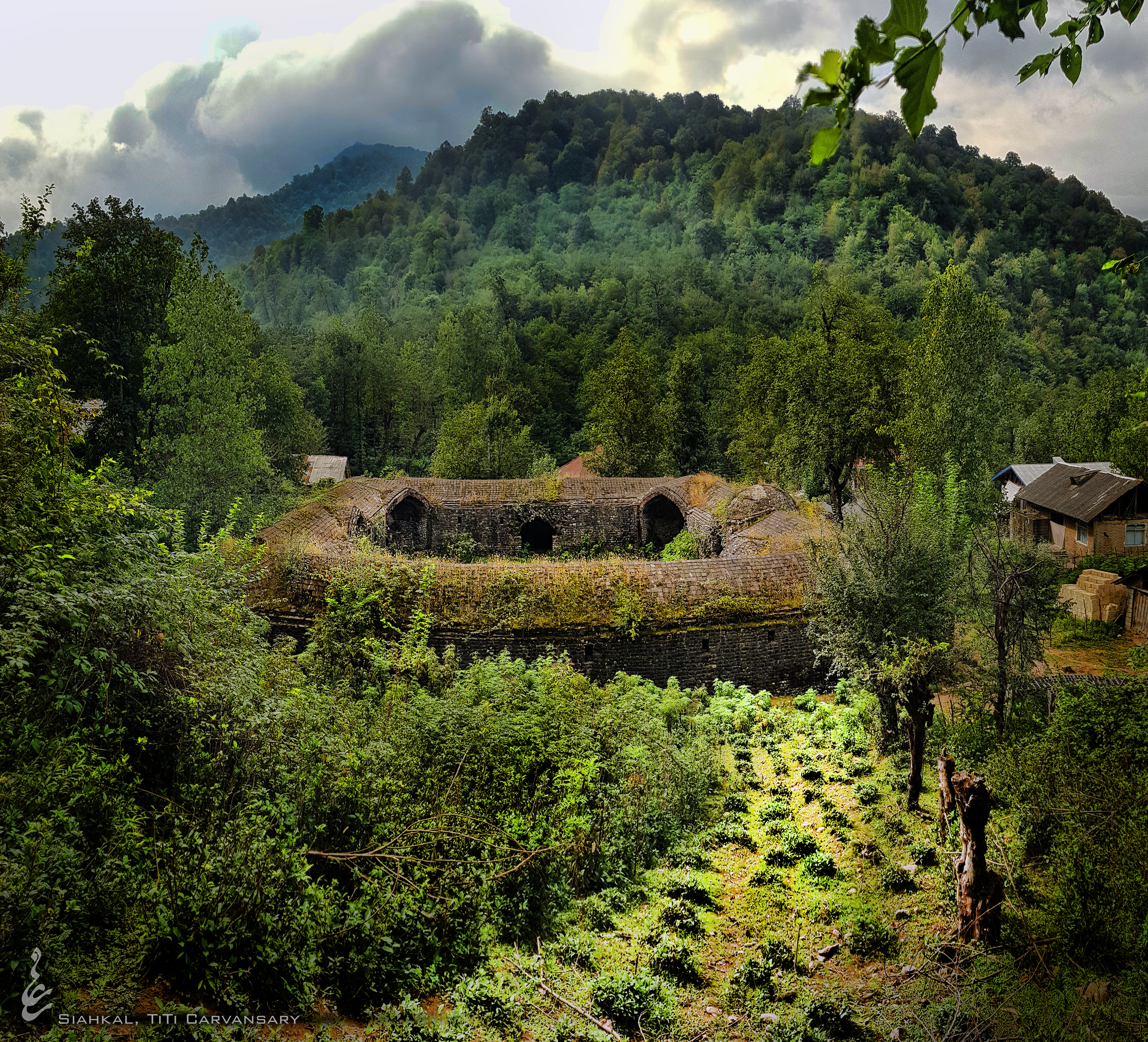
- Interactive map of the Titi Caravanserai area

General information
- Location: Siahkal County, Iran

Technical details
- Size: 398 m^{2} (4,280 sq ft)

UNESCO World Heritage Site
- Part of: The Persian Caravanserai
- Criteria: (ii)(iii)
- Reference: 1668
- Inscription: 2023 (45th Session)

The Titi Caravanserai (Persian and Gilaki: تی تی کاروانسرا) Is a Caravanserai in Siahkal County, Iran. Dating back to Safavid era, it was enlisted in the Iran national heritage sites list with the registration number 1784 on 2 December 1996.

== Description ==
It was constructed using bricks, gypsum, and stones by the order of Titi Khanum, a Safavid ruler's aunt.

== Gallery ==
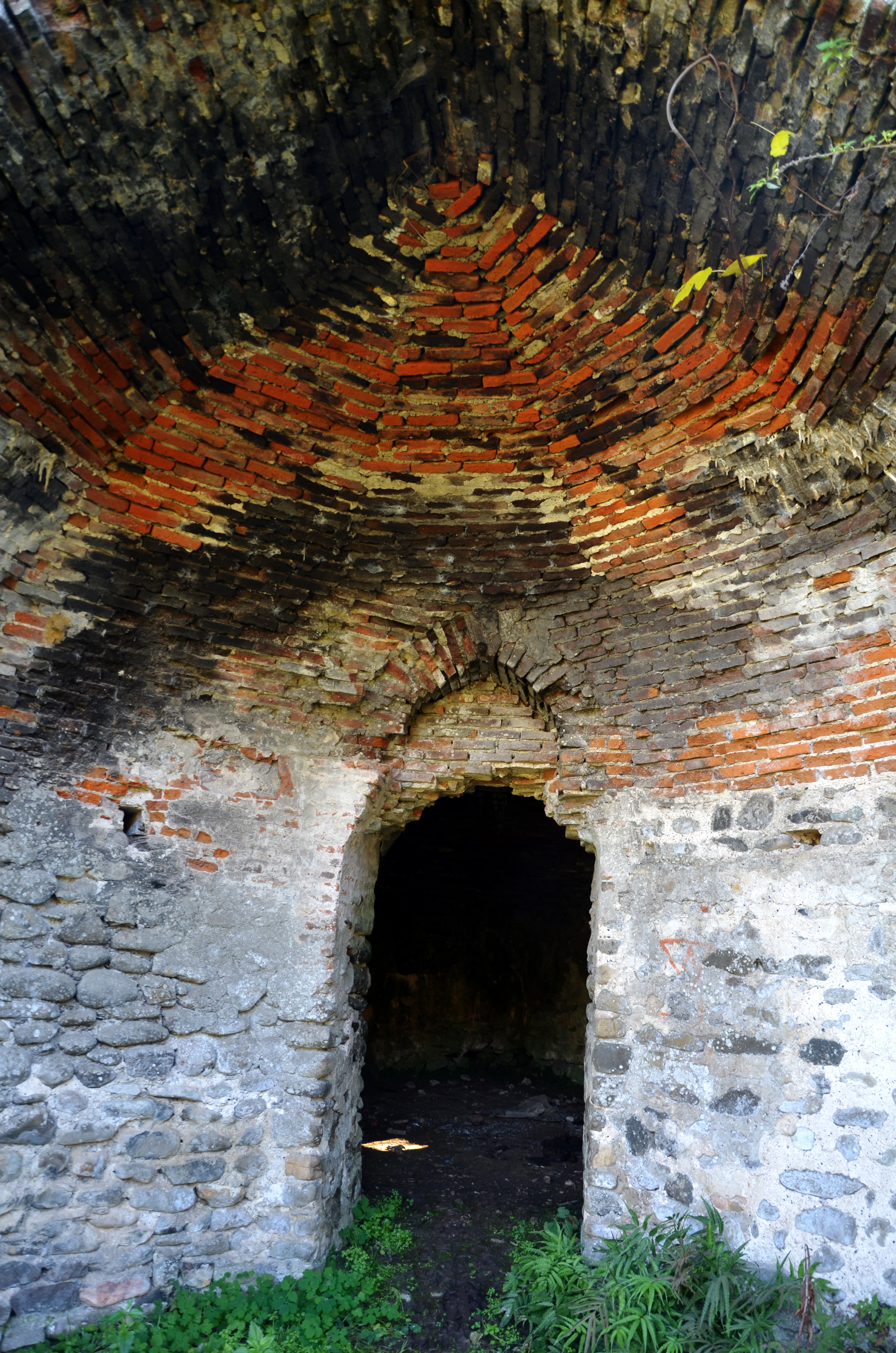

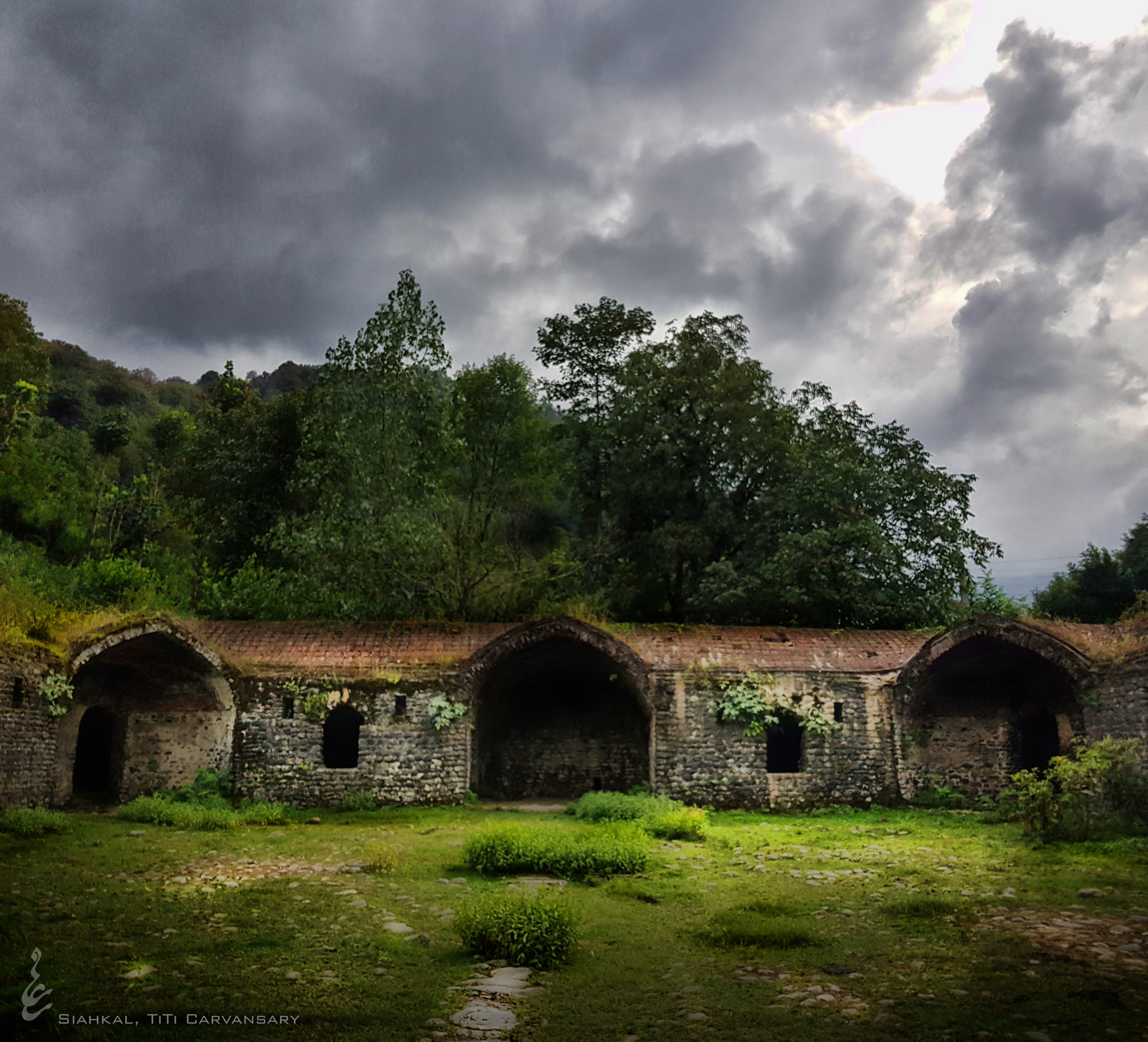

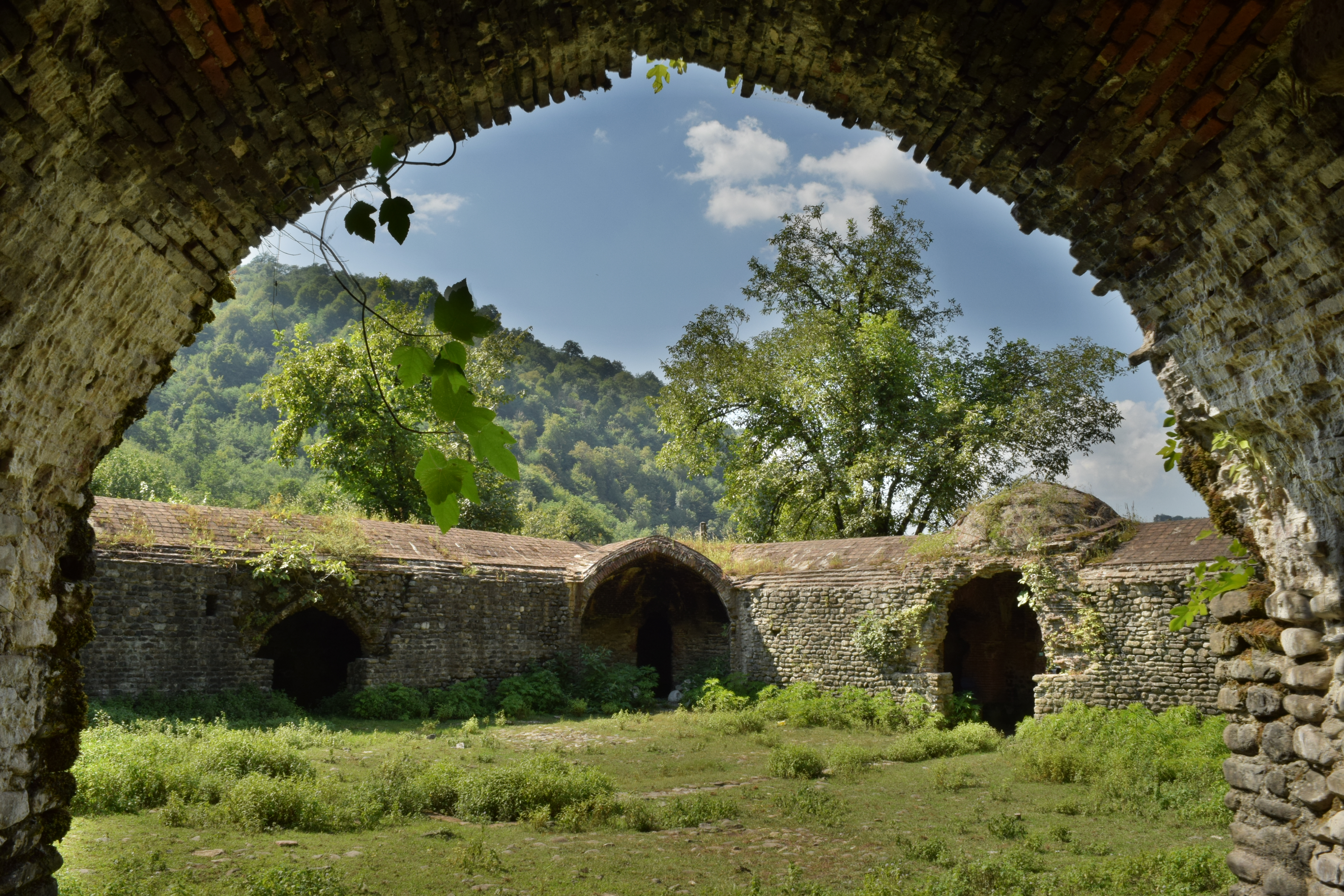

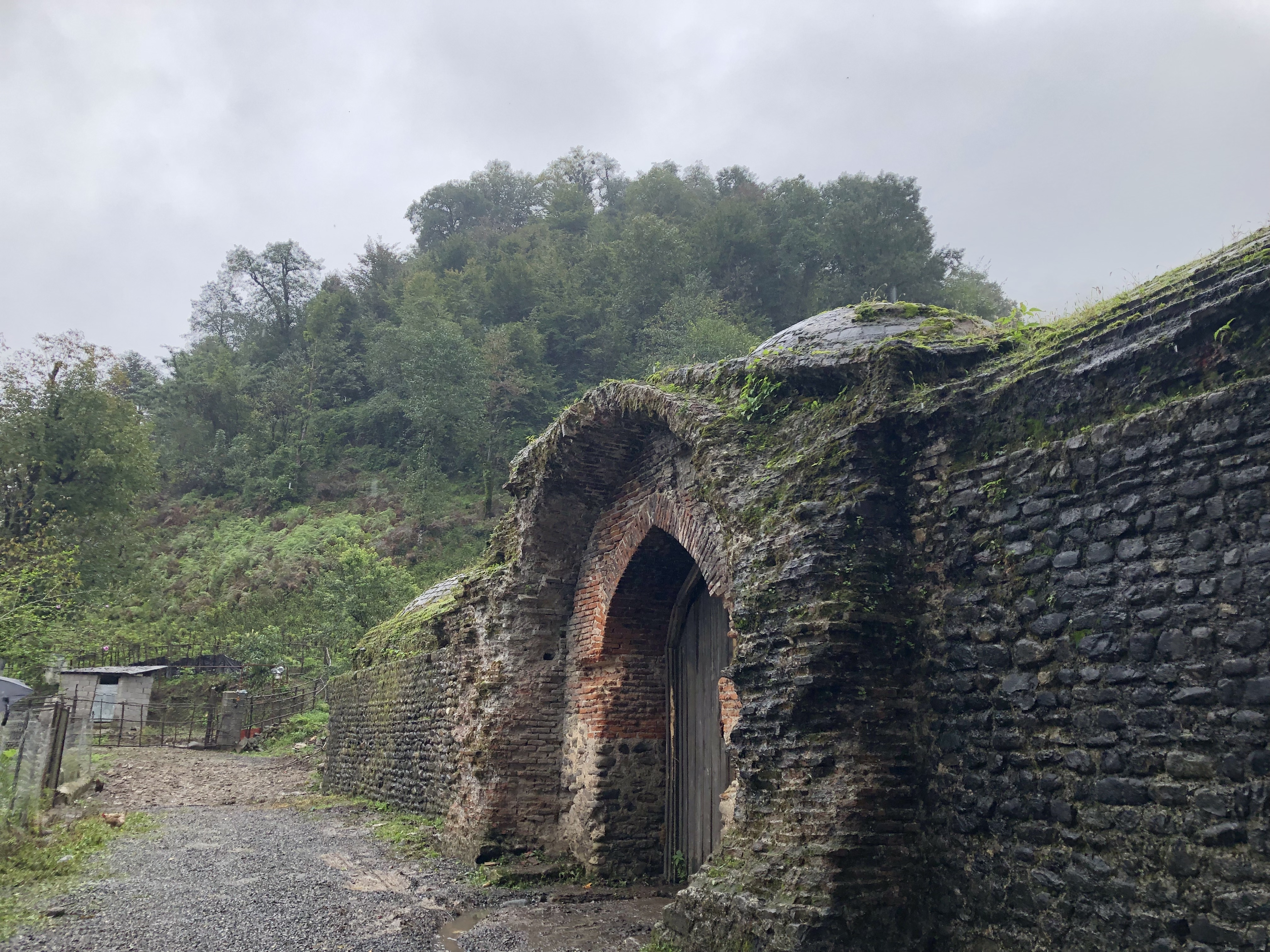
