= The Persian Caravanserai =

UNESCO World Heritage Site
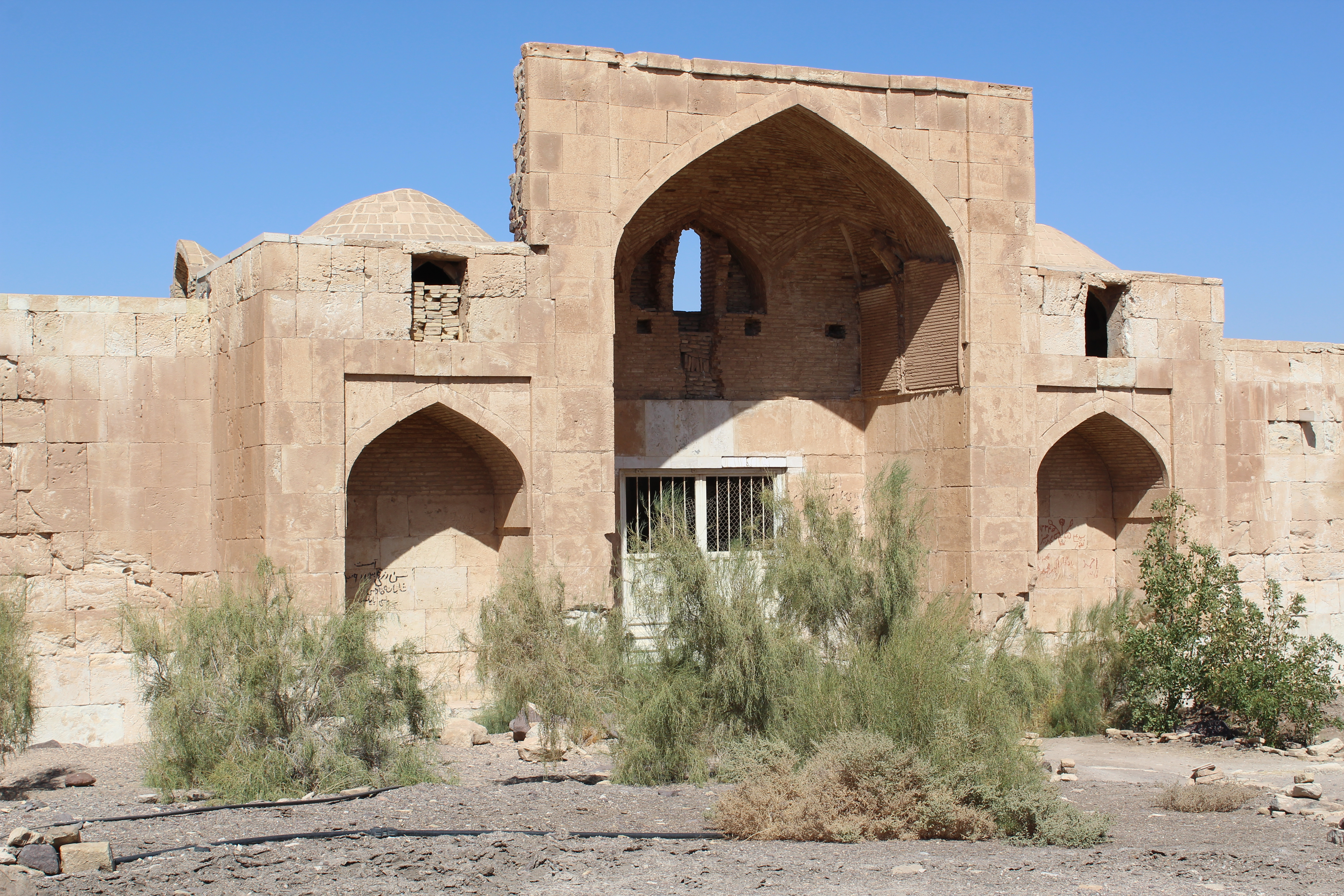
- Qasr-e-Bahram
- Interactive map of The Persian Caravanserai
- Criteria: (ii)(iii)
- Reference: 1668

The Persian Caravanserai (Persian: کاروانسراهای ایرانی) is a UNESCO World Heritage Site composed of 54 different caravanserais. It was inscribed in 2023. Caravanserais were roadside inns, which would provide shelter to travelers.

== List ==
ID (UNESCO)	Image	Name	Province	Notes and citations
1668-001		Deyr-e Gachin	Qom	
1668-002		Noushirvān	Semnan	
1668-003		Āhovān	Semnan	
1668-004		Parand	Tehran	
1668-005		Ribat-i Sharaf (Robāt-e Sharaf)	Razavi Khorasan	A Seljuk caravanserai originally built in 1114–5, converted into a palace in 1154. Transliterated as Robāt-e Sharaf in its UNESCO designation.
1668-006		Anjireh Ājori	Yazd	
1668-007		Anjireh Sangi	Yazd	
1668-008		Abbās Ābād Tāybād	Razavi Khorasan	
1668-009		Jamāl Ābād	East Azerbaijan	
1668-010		Qelli	North Khorasan	
1668-011		Fakhr-e Dāvūd	Razavai Khorasan	
1668-012		Sheikhali Khān	Isfahan	
1668-013		Maranjāb	Isfahan	
1668-014		Amin Ābād	Isfahan	
1668-015		Gabr Ābād	Isfahan	
1668-016		Mahyār	Isfahan	
1668-017		Gaz	Isfahan	
1668-018		Kūhpāyeh	Isfahan	
1668-019		Mazinān	Razavai Khorasan	
1668-020		Mehr	Razavai Khorasan	
1668-021		Zafarāniyeh	Razavai Khorasan	
1668-022		Fakhr Ābād	Razavai Khorasan	
1668-023		Sarāyān	South Khorasan	
1668-024		Qasr-e Bahrām	Semnan	
1668-025		Mayāmey	Semnan	
1668-026		Abbās Ābād	Semnan	
1668-027		Miāndasht	Semnan	
1668-028		Zeynoddīn	Yazd	
1668-029		Meybod	Yaza	
1668-030		Farasfaj	Hamedan	
1668-031		Īzadkhāst	Fars	
1668-032		Bisotūn	Kermanshah	
1668-033		Ganjali Khān	Kerman	
1668-034		Yengeh Emām	Alborz	
1668-035		Khājeh Nazar	East Azerbaijan	
1668-036		Goujebel	East Azerbaijan	
1668-037		Sa'in	Ardabil	
1668-038		Titi	Gilan	
1668-039		Dehdasht	Kohgiluyeh and Boyer-Ahmad	
1668-040		Khoy	West Azerbaijan	
1668-041		Bāgh-e Sheikh	Markazi	
1668-042		Neyestānak	Isfahan	
1668-043		Chehel Pāyeh	Kerman	
1668-044		Khān	West Azerbaijan	
1668-045		Deh Mohammad	South Khorasan	
1668-046		Tāj Ābād	Hamedan	
1668-047		Chāh kūrān	Kerman	
1668-048		Kharānaq	Yazd	
1668-049		Rashti	Yazd	
1668-050		Borāzjān	Bushehr	
1668-051		Chameshk	Lorestan	
1668-052		Afzal	Khuzestan	
1668-053		Bastak	Hormozgan	
1668-054		Saʿadossaltaneh	Qazvin	

== See also ==
- Iranian architecture
- List of caravanserais
