= Ribat of Zein-o-din =

UNESCO World Heritage Site in Iran

- رباط زين الدين
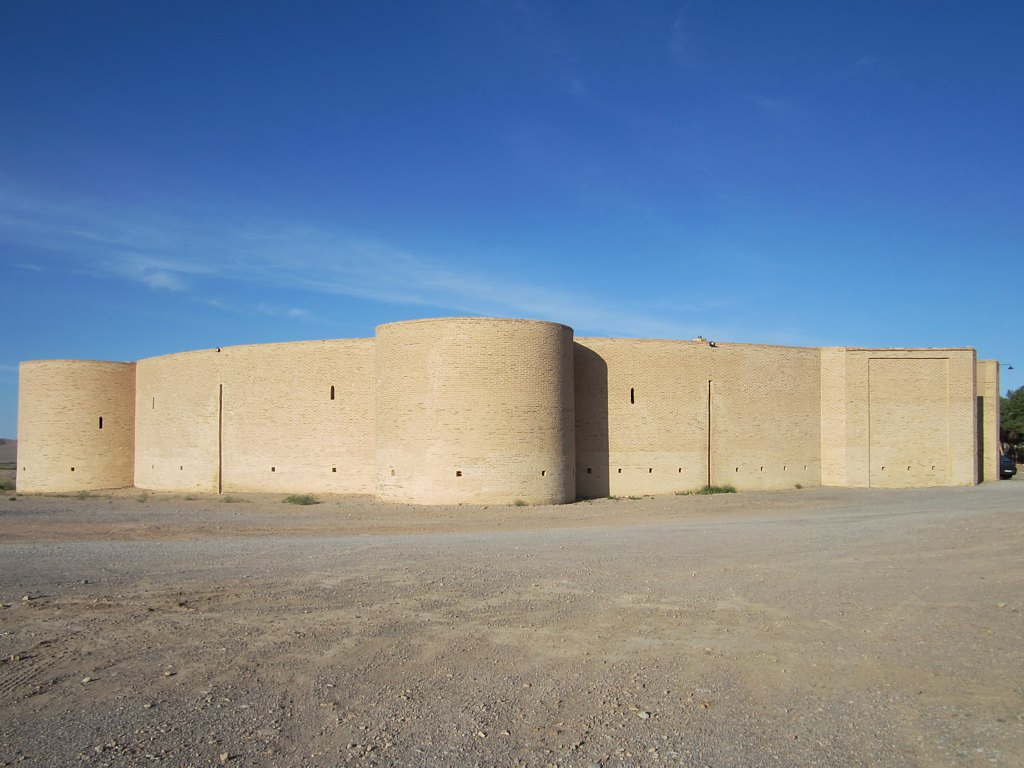

General information
- Type: Ribat, Caravanserai
- Architectural style: Safavid style
- Location: Zein-o-din, Yazd, Iran, Yazd – Kerman Road, The Silk Road
- Coordinates: 31.411653°N 54.706872°E
- Construction started: 16th century
- Client: Abbas the Great

Technical details
- Floor count: 2

UNESCO World Heritage Site
- Part of: The Persian Caravanserai
- Criteria: Cultural: ii, iii
- Reference: 1668-028
- Inscription: 2023 (45th Session)

The Ribat of Zein-o-din or Zein-o-Din Caravanserai is located in Zein-o-din, Yazd, Iran. The Ribat dates to the 16th century and is situated on the ancient Silk Road. It is one of 999 such inns that were built during the reign of Abbas the Great to provide facilities to travelers. Of these, Zein-o-din is one of two caravanserais built with circular towers. After its refurbishment, it has operated as an inn. A similarly built caravanserai near Isfahan is in ruins.

== Geography ==
The Caravanserai is situated on the Silk Road which was, until 1500, the main trade route between Europe and Asia. A motorway to Yazd passes through Zein-o-din. In earlier centuries, it was reached after a two-day camel ride from south of Yazd, about 60 kilometres (37 mi) on the main road to Kerman.

== Background ==
The caravanserai's exterior view appears like a "derelict ruin" though its interior is well refurbished in its original form making it an "atmospheric and fascinating" place to stay.

== History ==
The first caravanserais were reported 2,500 years ago, when Persia was ruled by the Achaemenid Empire. During the Safavid era in Iran, caravanserais were established at convenient sites at a distance of every 20 to 30 miles along the trade routes across the country. Many such buildings were built on old and new caravan routes under the reigns of Abbas the Great (1587–1629) and Shah Abbas II (1642–66). The caravanserai is one of the 999 such hostels built to promote trade.

An entry fee was charged along with a daily fee for an 8 ft-square room. The rooms were fitted with a fireplace, and servants had a separate place in which to stay. The caretaker of the caravanserai was legally authorized to collect sales tax and oversee all transactions; they sometimes tended to overcharge and cheat the merchants. It was incumbent on the caretakers to provide security to the merchants and their goods against theft. The running of the caravanserais in Iran was considered at par with those that were run in the Ottoman Empire.

== Architecture and fittings ==
The caravanserai is a two-storied structure, square in plan, with a 16-sided courtyard and a water pool. Only two caravanserais have been built with circular towers. One of these is the Zein-o-din Caravanserai and the other, in a ruined state, is near Isfahan. This caravanserai has withstood inclement weather as it was initially well built.

Its recent renovation took three years to complete, and included the use of 13,000 pumice stones to remove the grime on the interior walls. Restored to a near original state, the rooms are on a raised base and mattresses are provided on the floor, which are covered with carpets. There is no door separating the rooms from the corridor, with only a curtain providing privacy to the occupants. However, the common bathroom facility is well fitted. The building accommodates 60 to 80 tourists daily; tourists from 70 countries are reported to have stayed here.

== Features ==
As the caravanserai is located away from the city, the noise level is minimum and the night skies are clear and star studded. An amateur astronomer conducts astronomy lectures on the rooftop.

== Gallery ==
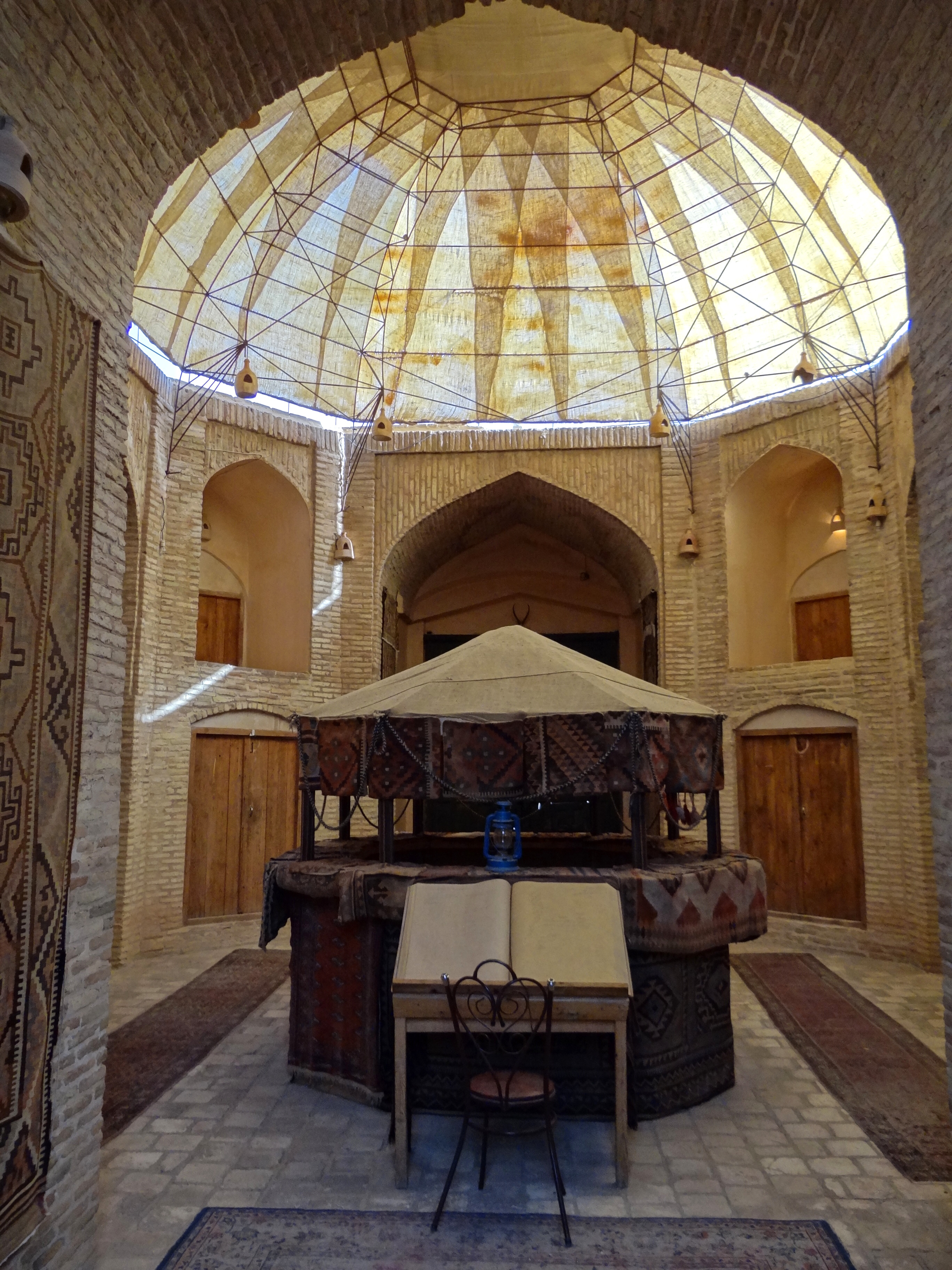

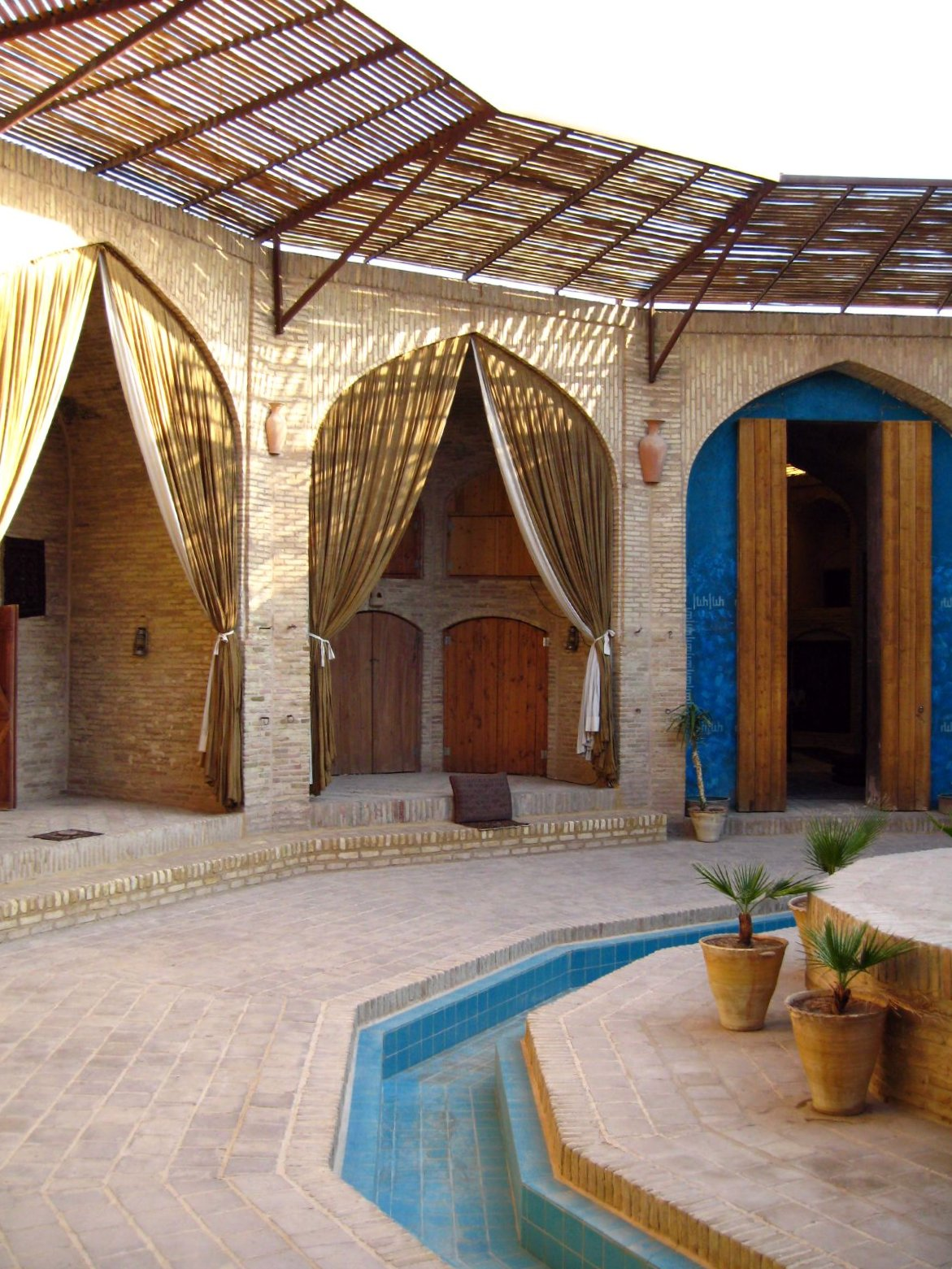

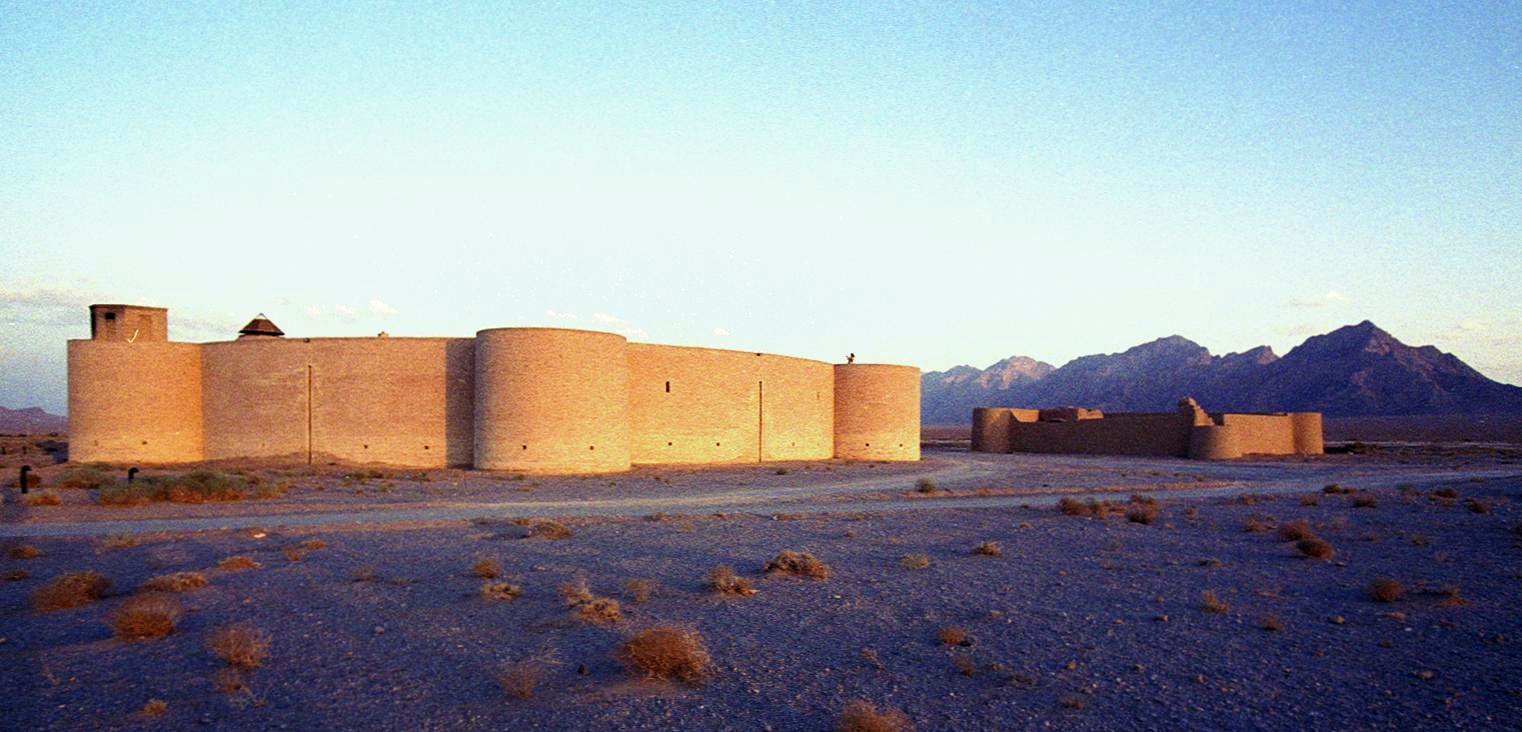

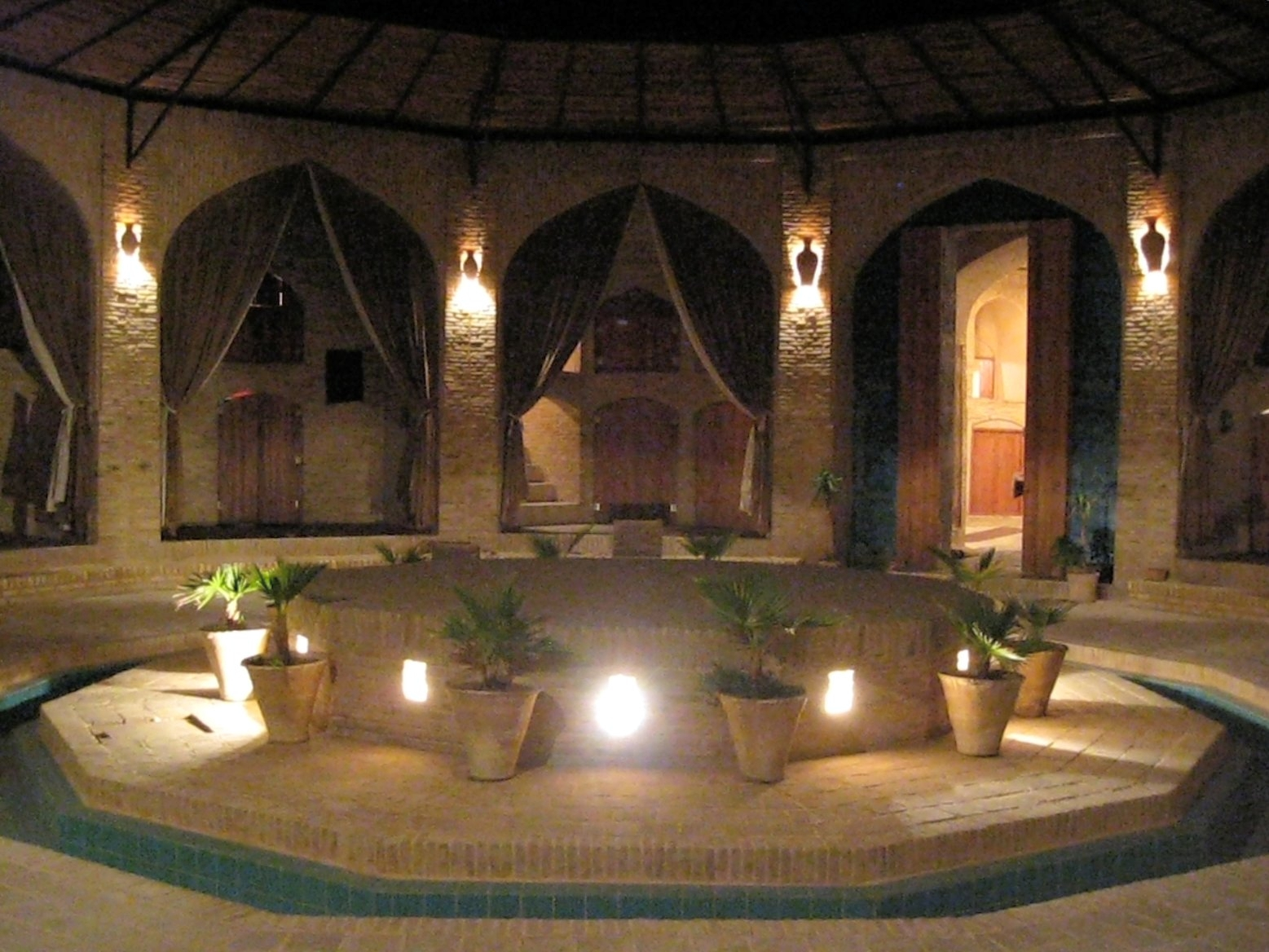

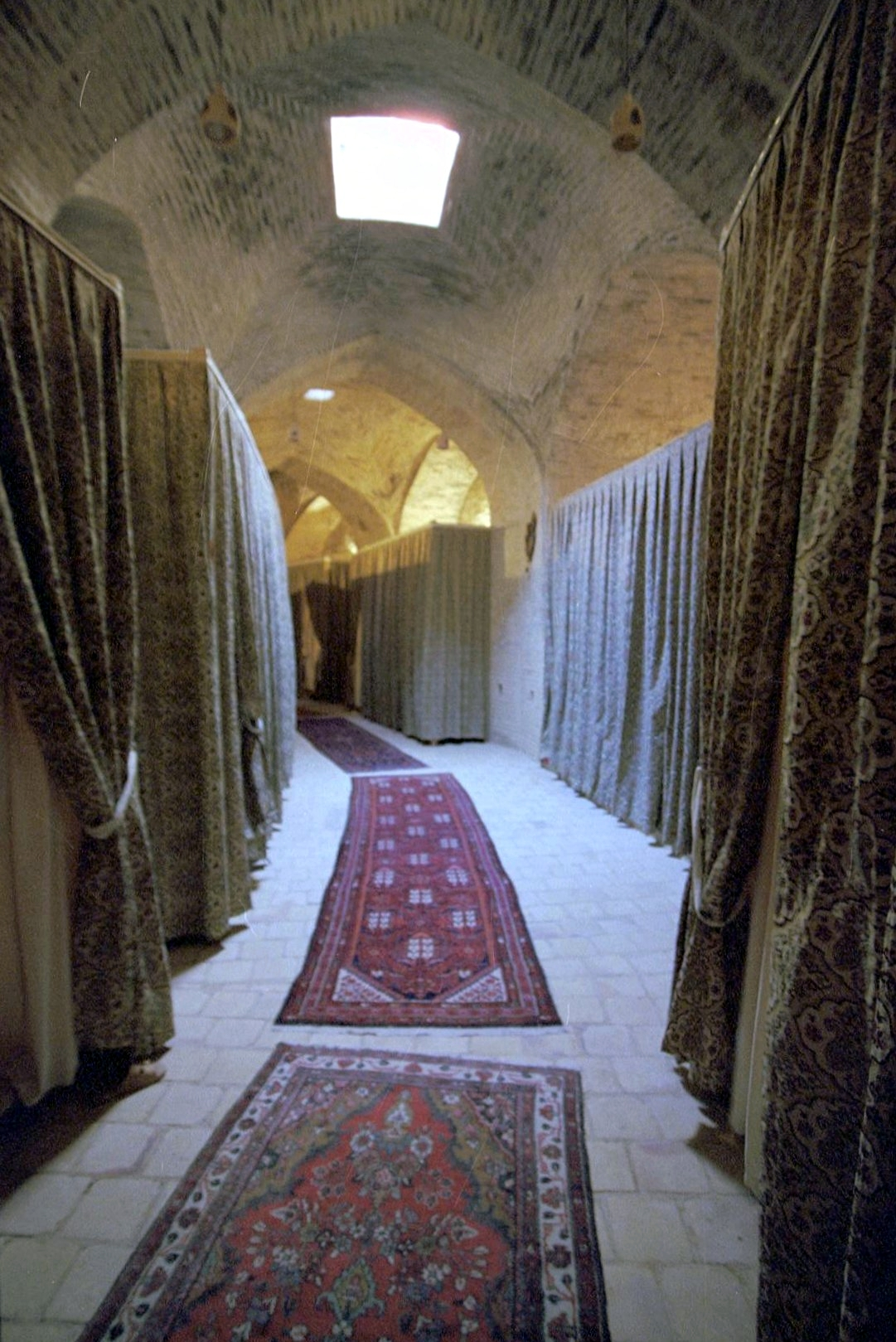

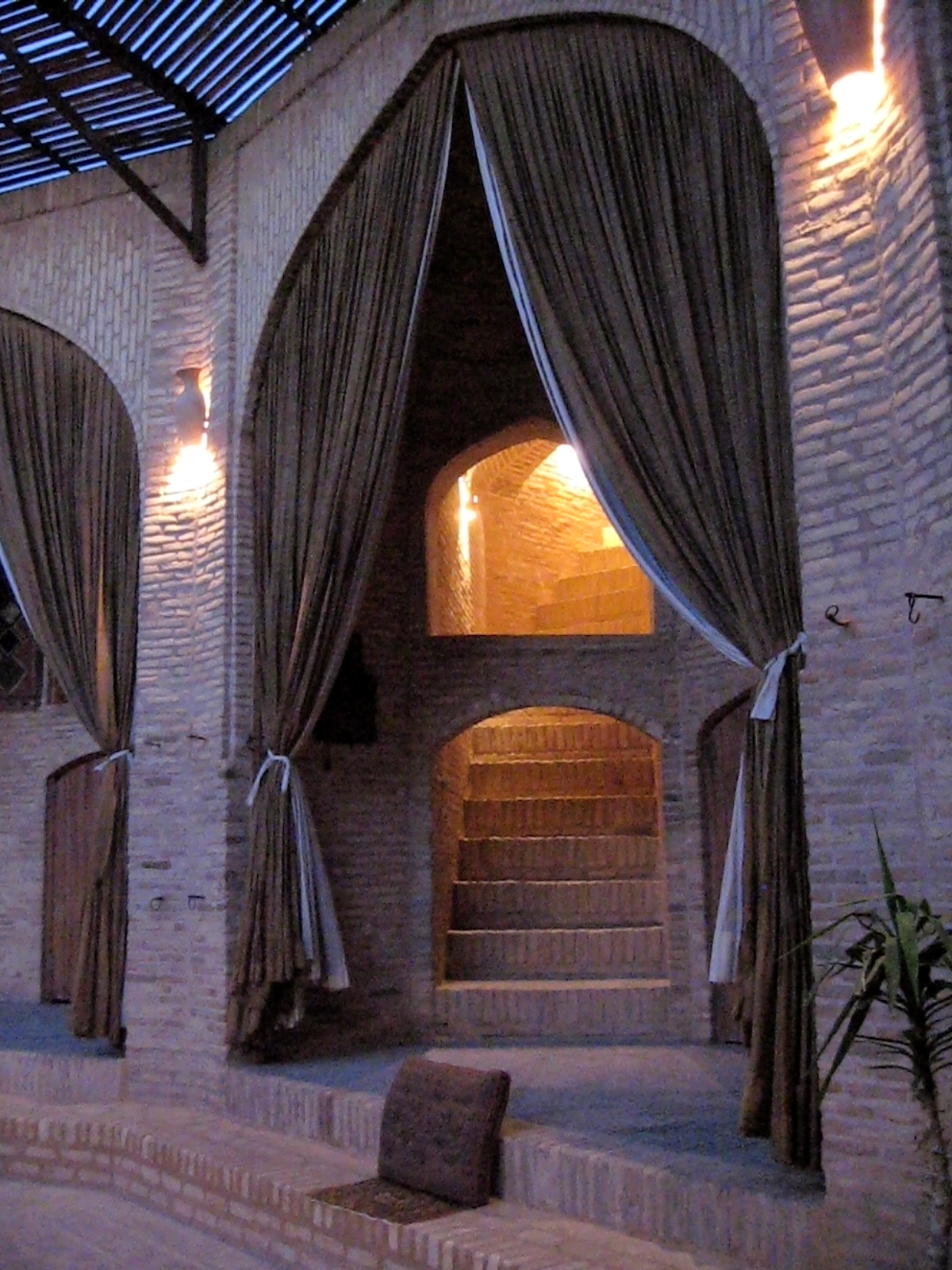

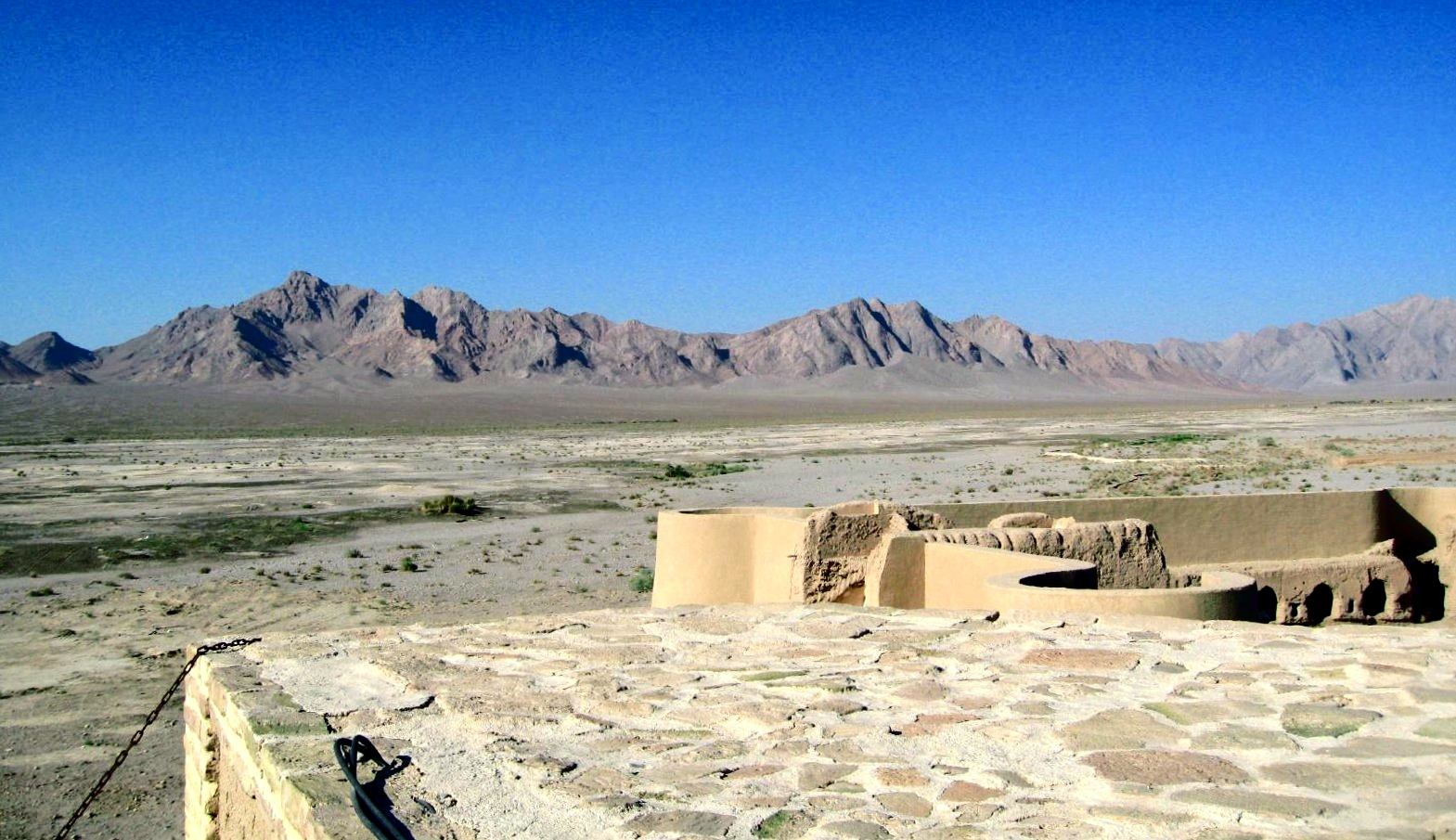

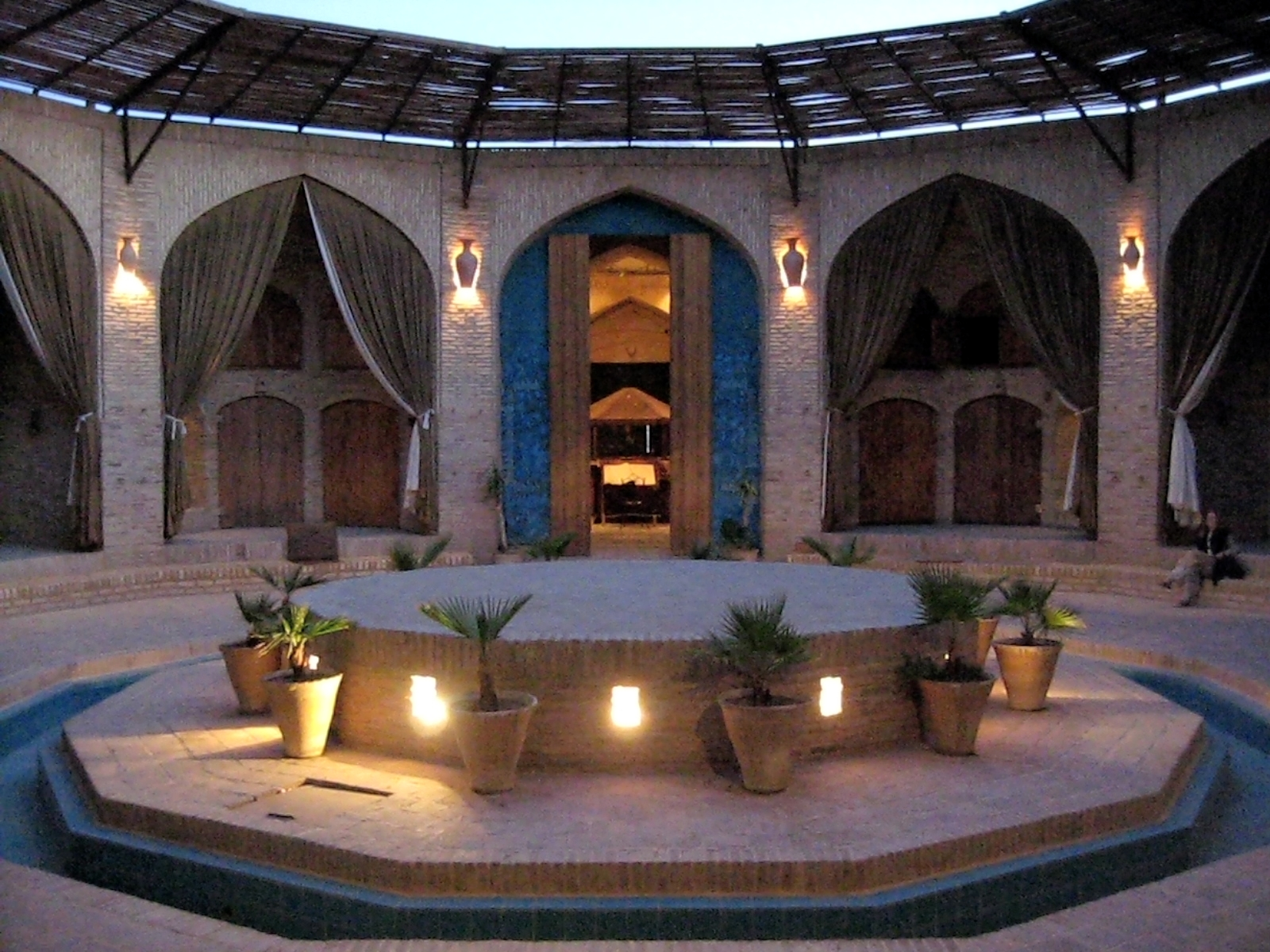

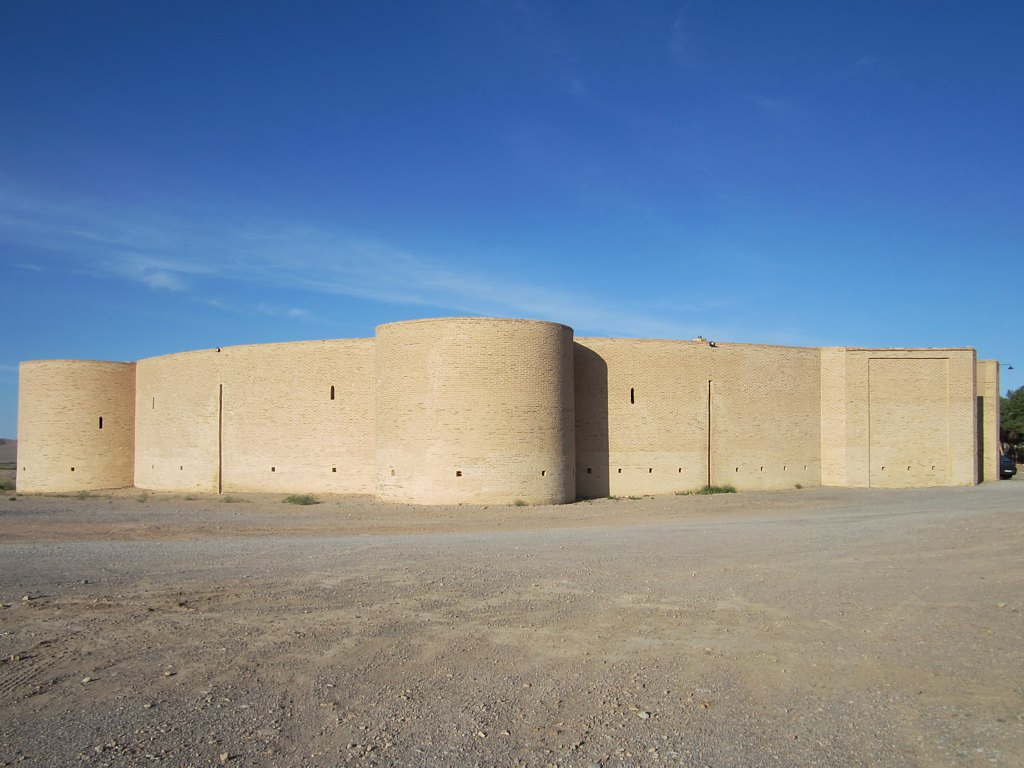

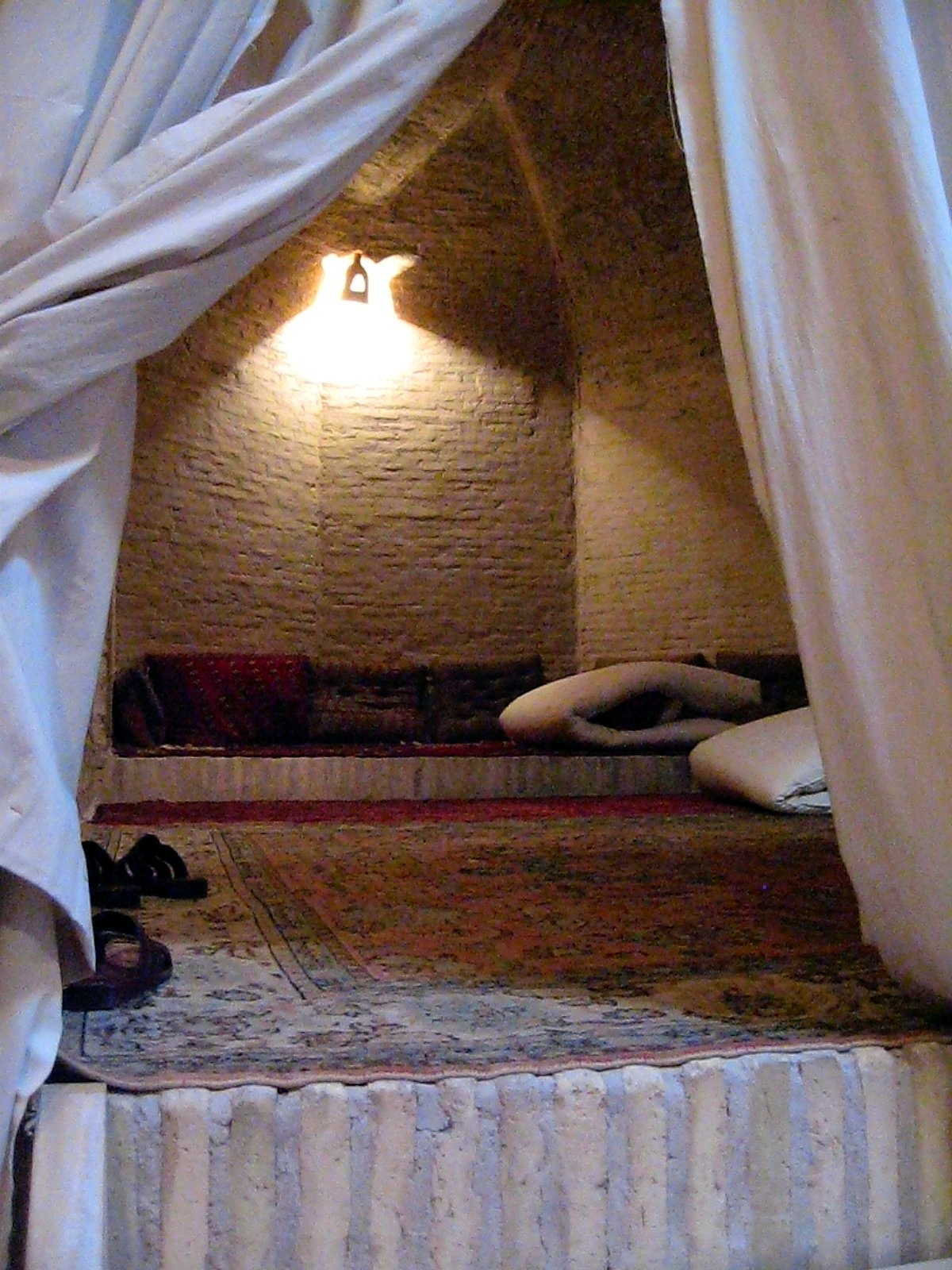

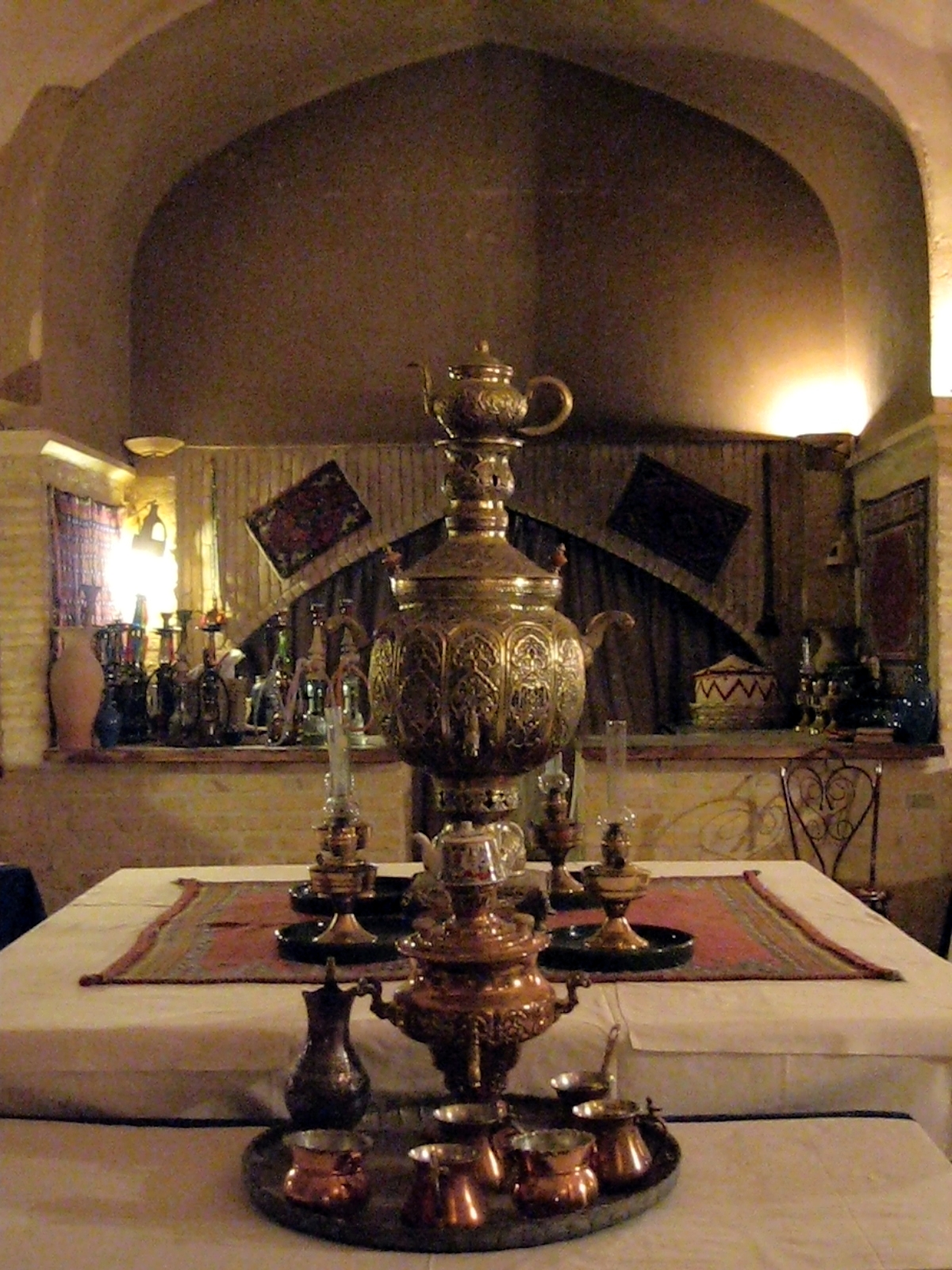
