= Sarayan Caravanserai =

UNESCO World Heritage Site in Iran

Coordinates: 33°51′19″N 58°31′05″E

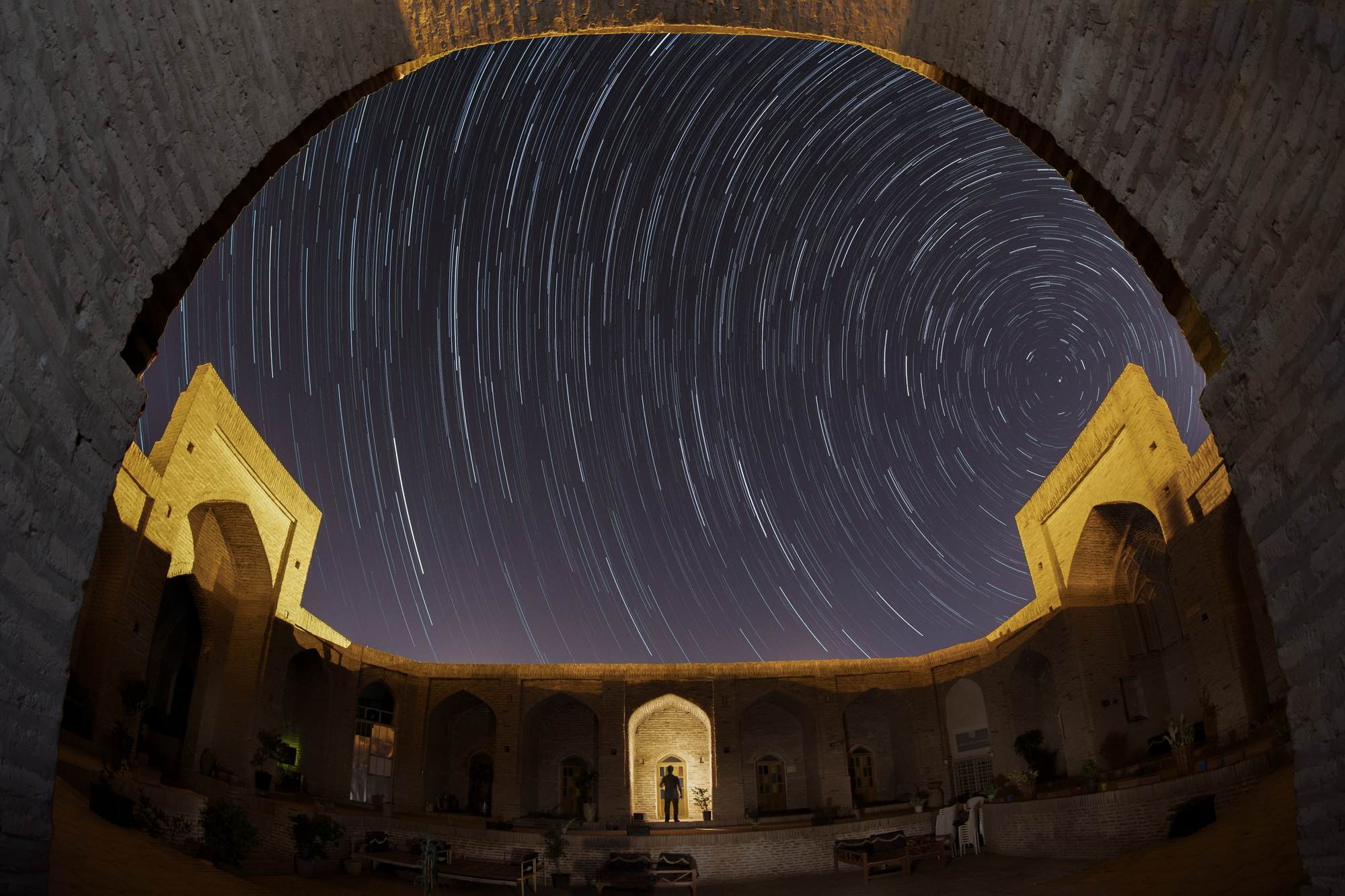
- Interactive map of the Sarayan Caravanserai area

General information
- Type: caravanserai
- Location: Sarayan

UNESCO World Heritage Site
- Part of: The Persian Caravanserai
- Criteria: (ii)(iii)
- Reference: 1668
- Inscription: 2023 (45th Session)

Sarayan Caravanserai (Persian: کاروانسرای سرایان) is a caravanserai located in the city of Sarayan, South Khorasan province, Iran.

== History ==
The caravanserai was built during the Safavid era.

== Description ==
A public bathhouse, a mudbrick cistern, and a bazaar are situated adjacent to the caravanserai.
