= Zafaraniyeh Caravanserai =

UNESCO World Heritage Site in Iran

- کاروانسرای زعفرانیه (Persian)
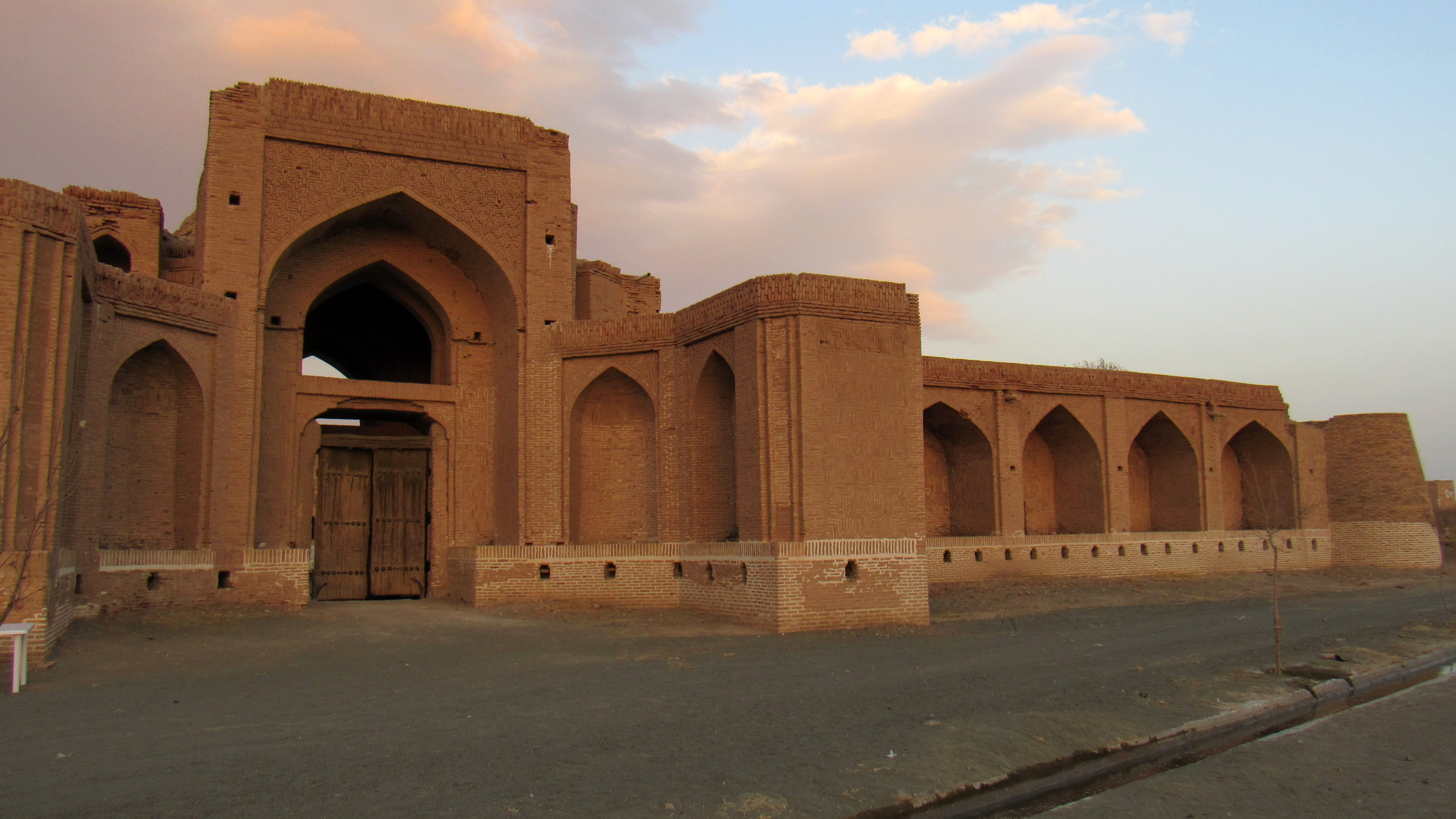

- Location within Iran
- 36.16572°N 58.08628°E
- Location: Zafaraniyeh, Iran

History
- Built: Safavid era

Site notes
- Restored: Qajar era

UNESCO World Heritage Site
- Type: Cultural
- Criteria: ii, iii
- Designated: 2023
- Part of: The Persian Caravanserai
- Reference no.: 1668-021

Zafaraniyeh Caravanserai (Persian: کاروانسرای زعفرانیه) is a historic caravanserai belonging to the Safavid and Qajar eras in Zafaraniyeh, Iran.

It was listed in the national heritage sites of Iran with the number 1696 on 8 December 1985.

== Gallery ==
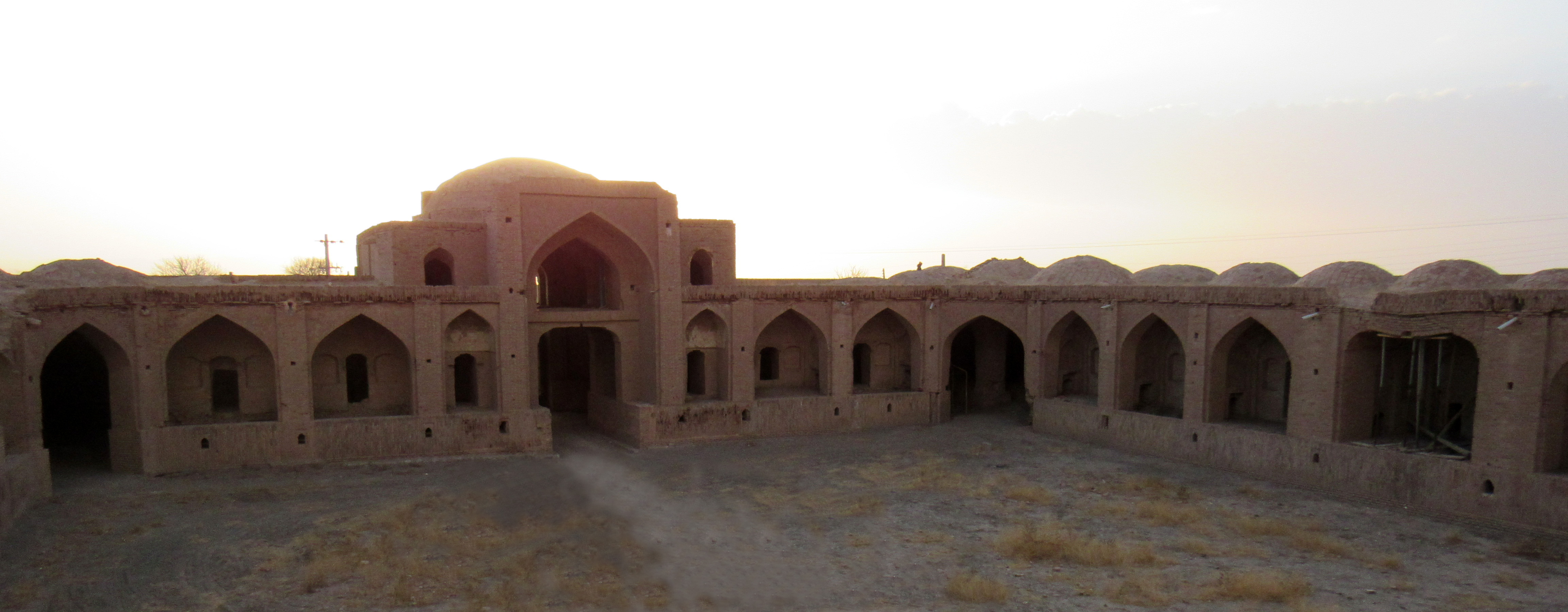

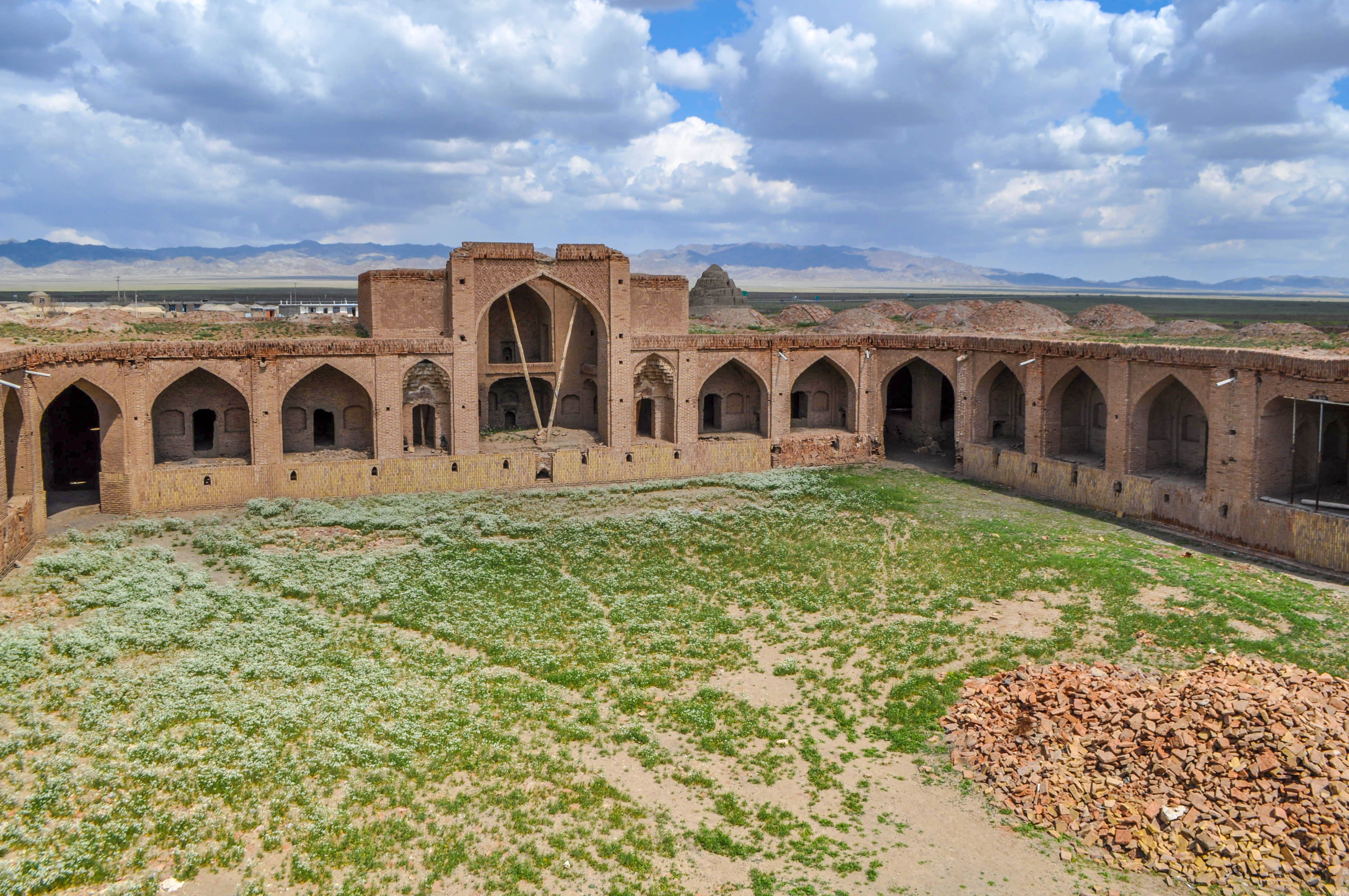

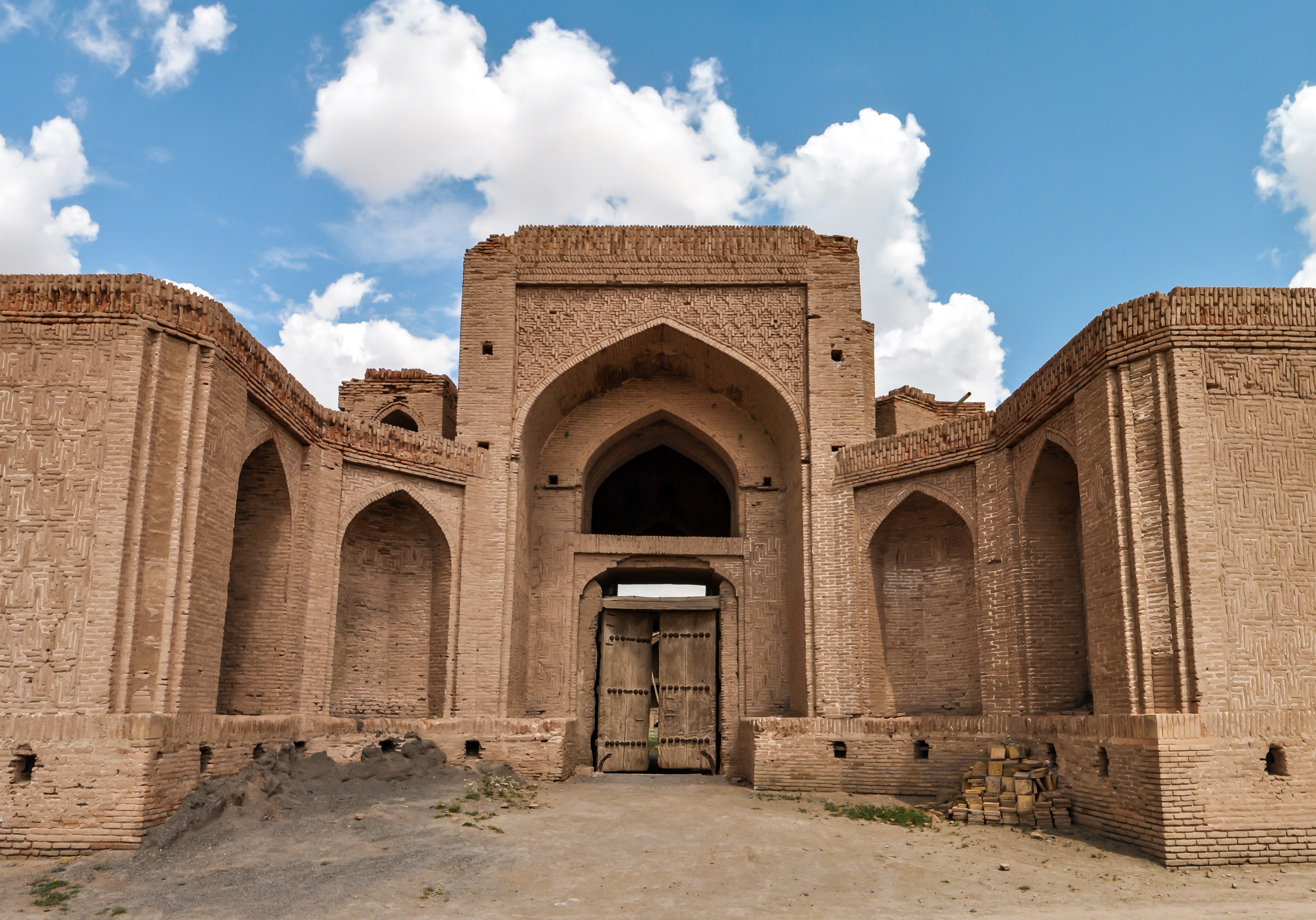

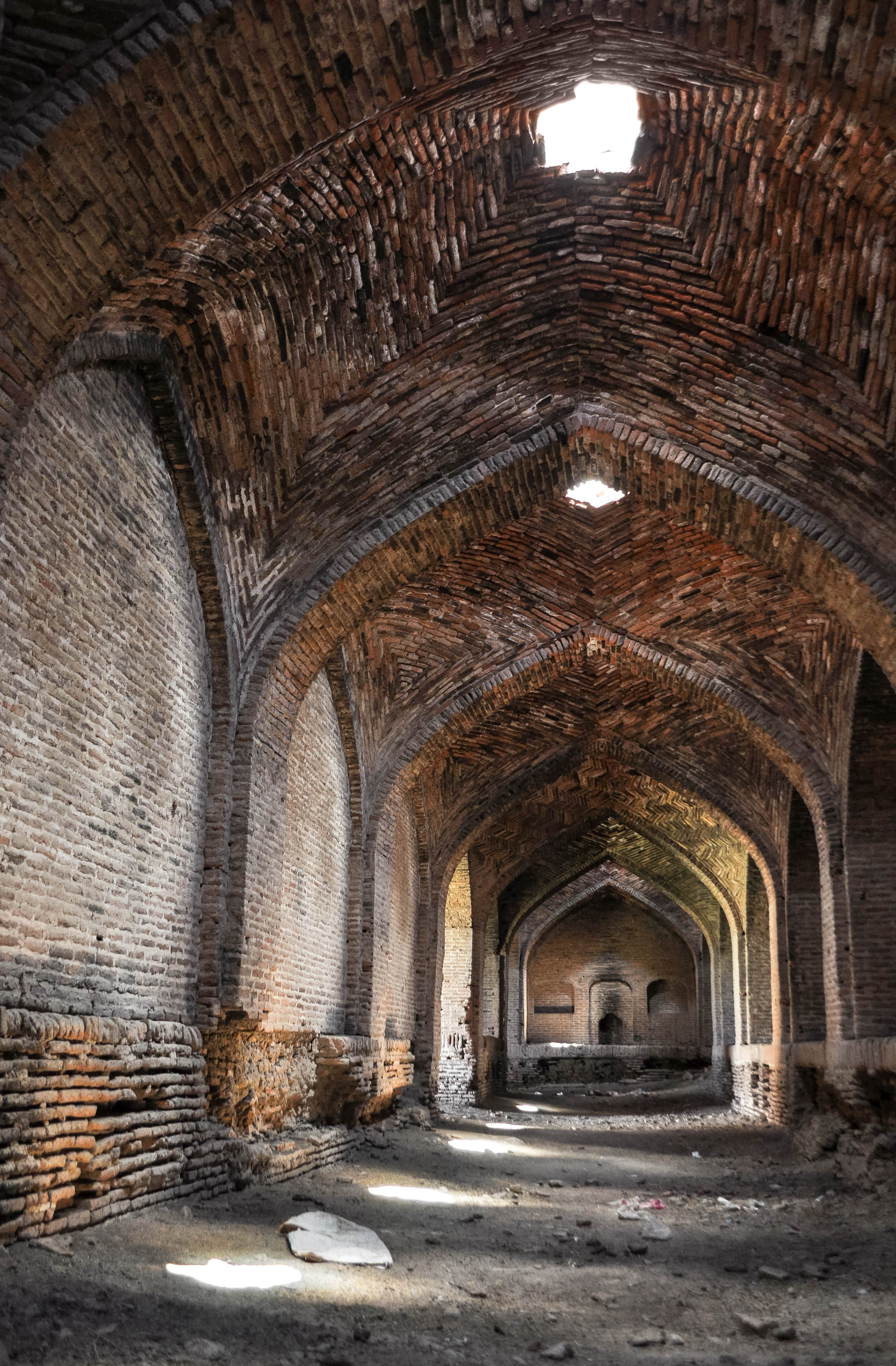
