= Borazjan Castle =

Castle in Bushehr province, Iran

- دژ برازجان
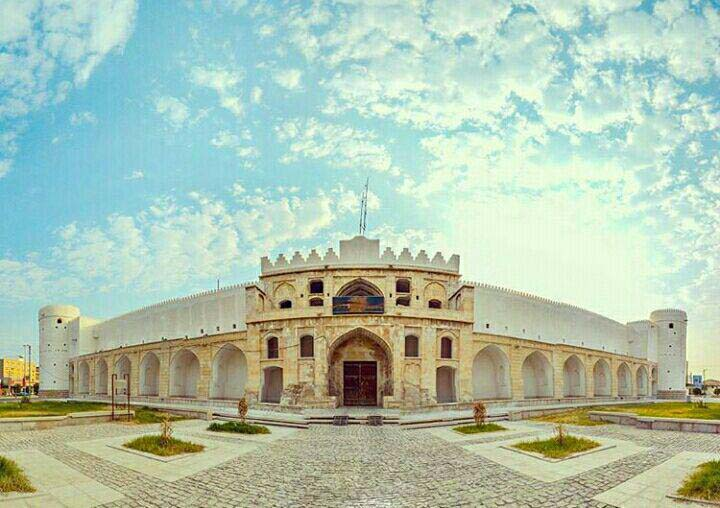

- Location within Iran
- Interactive map of the Borazjan Castle area

General information
- Type: Castle, Caravanserai
- Location: Dashtestan County, Iran
- Coordinates: 29°16′02″N 51°12′30″E

UNESCO World Heritage Site
- Part of: The Persian Caravanserai
- Criteria: Cultural: ii, iii
- Reference: 1668-050
- Inscription: 2023 (45th Session)

Borazjan Castle (Persian: دژ برازجان) is a Qajar era castle and caravanserai located in Dashtestan County, Bushehr province, Iran. It was constructed during the reign of Naser al-Din Shah Qajar and is the only caravanserai in Iran built of stone and mortar.
