= Zafaraniyeh, Razavi Khorasan =

Zafaraniyeh زعفرانيه
- Village
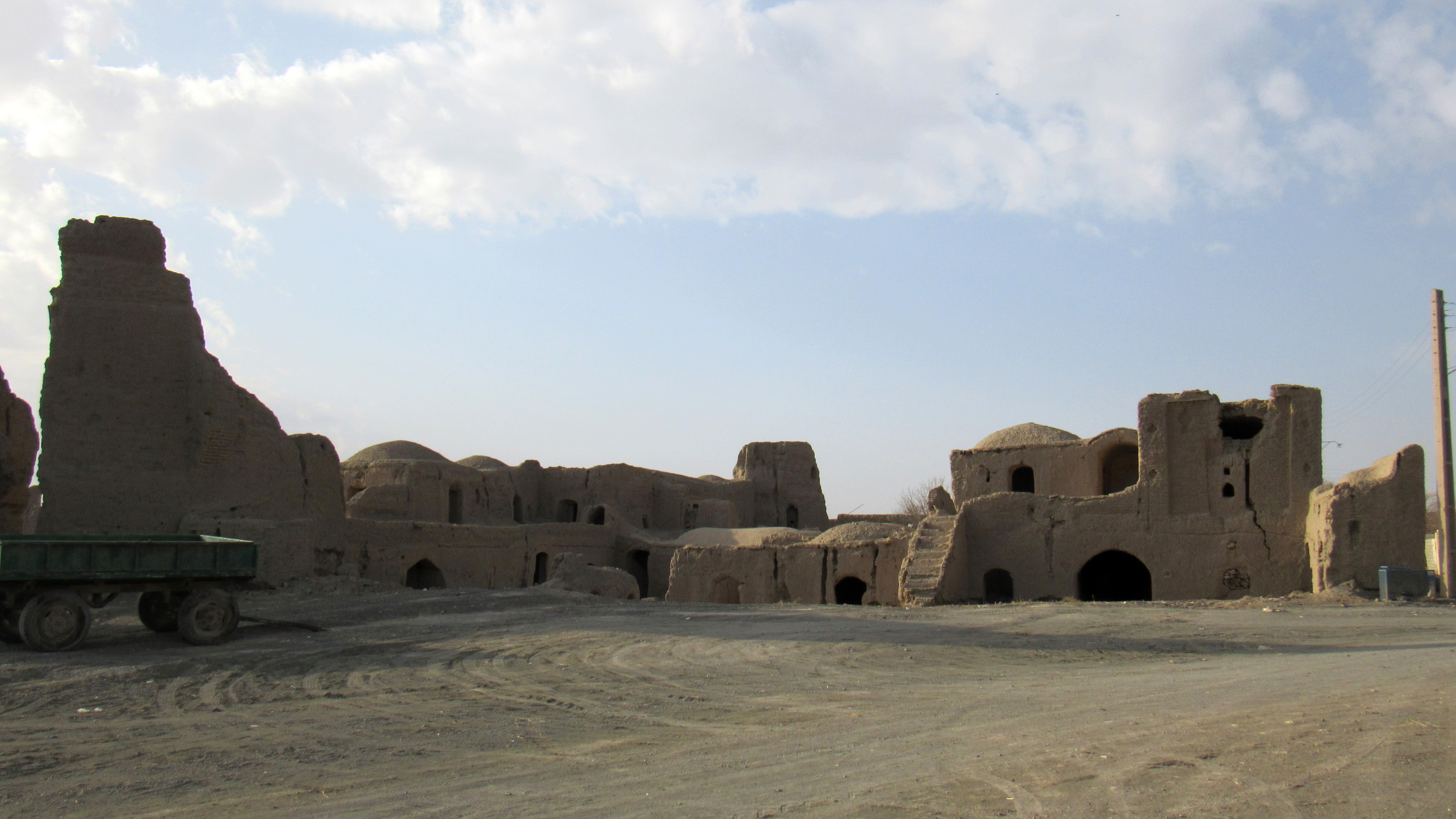

- Location within Iran
- Coordinates: 36°09′53″N 58°05′08″E
- Country: Iran
- Province: Razavi Khorasan
- County: Sabzevar
- Bakhsh: Central
- Rural District: Robat

Population (2006)
  - Total: 232
- Time zone: UTC+3:30 (IRST)
  - Summer (DST): UTC+4:30 (IRDT)

Zafaraniyeh (Persian: زعفرانيه, also Romanized as Za‘farānīyeh; also known as Za‘afarāni) is a village in Robat Rural District, in the Central District of Sabzevar County, Razavi Khorasan Province, Iran. At the 2006 census, its population was 232, in 70 families.

Zafaraniyeh Caravanserai is located near this village.
