= Khajeh Nazar Caravansarai =

UNESCO World Heritage Site in Iran

- کاروانسرای خواجه نظر (Persian)
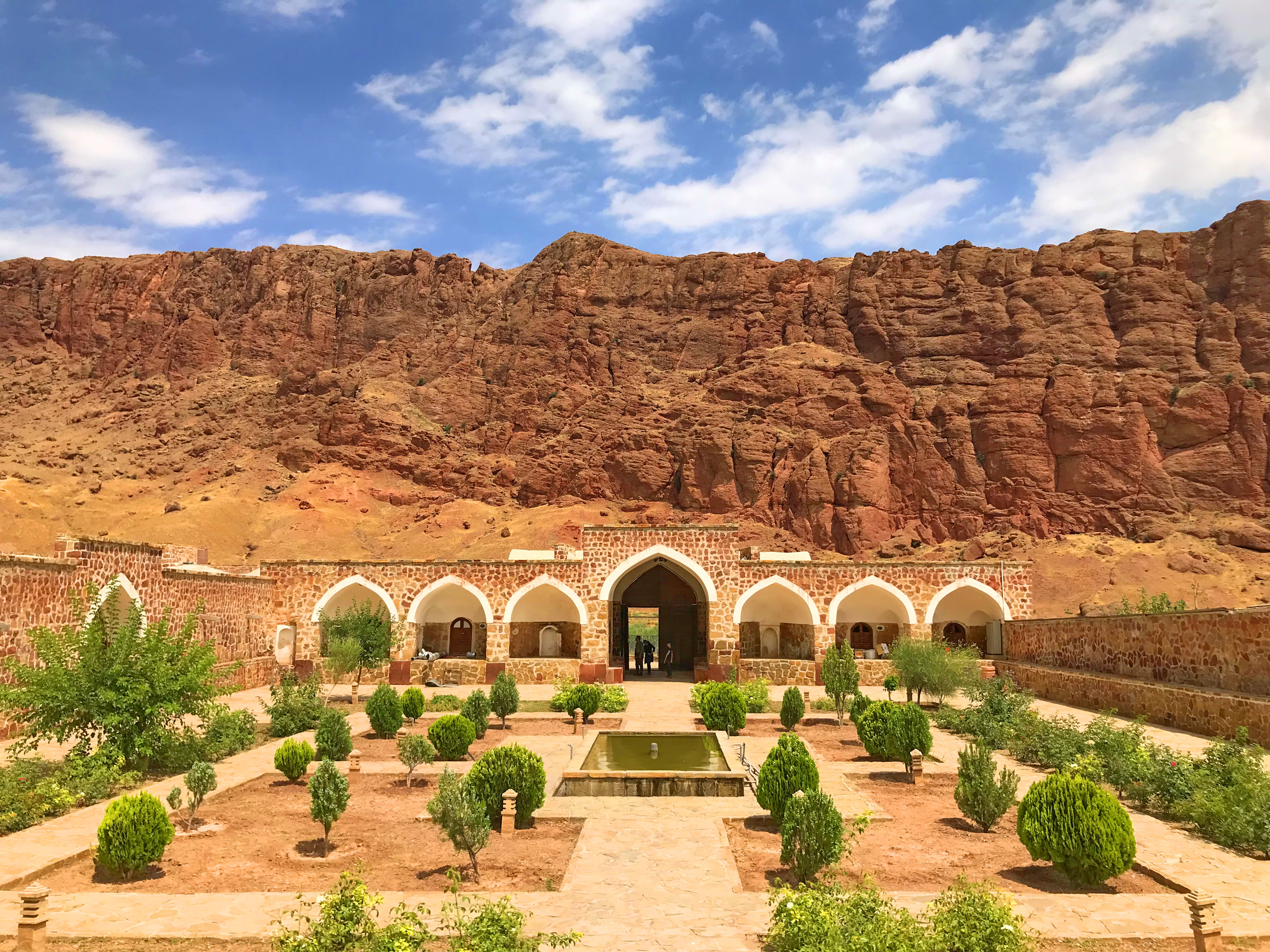

- Location within Iran
- 38.9775°N 45.576944°E
- Location: Jolfa County, Iran

History
- Built: Safavid era

UNESCO World Heritage Site
- Type: Cultural
- Criteria: ii, iii
- Designated: 2023
- Part of: The Persian Caravanserai
- Reference no.: 1668-035

Khajeh Nazar Caravansarai (Persian: کاروانسرای خواجه نظر) is a restored caravanserai in East Azerbaijan province, Iran. It is located above a bend of the Aras border River 5 km west of the city of Jolfa.

The caravanserai was registered on Iran's National Cultural Monument List in 2002 under the number 7744. In September 2023 it was inscribed as UNESCO World Heritage Site as one of the 54 Caravanserais of Iran with the registration number 1668-035.

== Architecture and fittings ==
The caravanserai was constructed in the Safavid era by the Armenian tradesman Khajeh Nazar. It was built using brick and sandstone. The structure is rectangular and has a central courtyard with three Iwans on either side of the courtyard and dome-shaped covers with curved arches.
