= Kavir National Park =

Protected ecological zone in northern Iran

- پارک ملی کویر
- IUCN category II (national park)
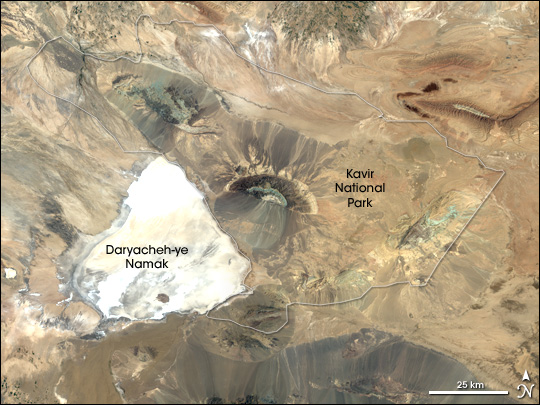
- Landsat 7 image of Kavir National Park
- Location in Iran
- Location: Iran
- Coordinates: 34.6347°N 52.4333°E
- Area: 4,000 km^{2} (1,500 sq mi)
- Established: 1982
- Governing body: Department of the Environment

UNESCO Biosphere Reserves in Iran

Kavir National Park (Persian: پارک ملی کویر) is a national park in northern Iran with an area of 4,000 km^{2} (1,500 sq mi) located on the western end of the Kavir Desert. It encompasses desert and steppe landscapes harbouring native goats (Capra aegagrus), sheep (Ovis orientalis), striped hyenas, Indian wolves, gazelles, Asiatic cheetah and the Persian leopard.
