= List of caravanserais in Armenia =

This is a list of caravanserais in Armenia.

== Caravanserais ==
#	Image	Name	Date	Province	Location
1	Արուճի քարավանատուն Aruch Caravansarai	Aruch Caravansarai	13th century	Aragatsotn Province	Aruch
2		Arayi Caravansarai	1213	Aragatsotn Province	Arayi
3	Թալինի քարավանատուն Talin Caravansarai	Talin Caravansarai	13th century	Aragatsotn Province	Talin
4		Sotk Caravansarai	7th century	Gegharkunik Province	Sotk
5		Geghasar Caravansarai	12th-13th century	Lori Province	Geghasar
6	Հրազդանի քարավանատուն Hrazdan Caravansarai	Hrazdan Caravansarai	13th century	Kotayk Province	Hrazdan
7		Krasar Caravansarai	19th century	Shirak Province	Krasar
8	Ջրափիի քարավանատուն Jrapi Qaravansarai	Jrapi Caravansarai	10th-11th century	Shirak Province	Jrapi
9		Agarak Caravansarai	17th century	Syunik Province	Agarak
10	Բարձրավանի քարավանատուն Bardzravan Caravansarai	Bardzravan Caravansarai	17th-18th century	Syunik Province	Bardzravan
11		Goris Caravansarai	17th-18th century	Syunik Province	Goris
12		Tsav Caravansarai	16th-17th century	Syunik Province	Tsav
13	Կոտրած քարավանատուն Kotrats Caravansarai	Kotrats Caravansarai	1319	Syunik Province	Harzhis
14	Օրբելյանների իջևանատուն Orbelian's Caravanserai	Orbelian's Caravanserai	1332	Vayots Dzor Province	Aghnjadzor
15		Aghnjadzor Caravansarai	14th century	Vayots Dzor Province	Aghnjadzor
16		Ijevan Caravansarai	10th-13th century	Tavush Province	Ijevan
17	Առաքելոց գյուղատեղու քարավանատուն Caravansarai in Araqelots village	Acharkut Caravansarai	13th-14th century	Tavush Province	Acharkut

== See also ==
- List of castles in Armenia
- List of monasteries in Armenia
- Caravanserai of Zor
