= Caravanserai of Zor =

Medieval Armenian Caravanserai

Coordinates: 39.8368°N 43.8392°E

- Զորի քարավանատուն
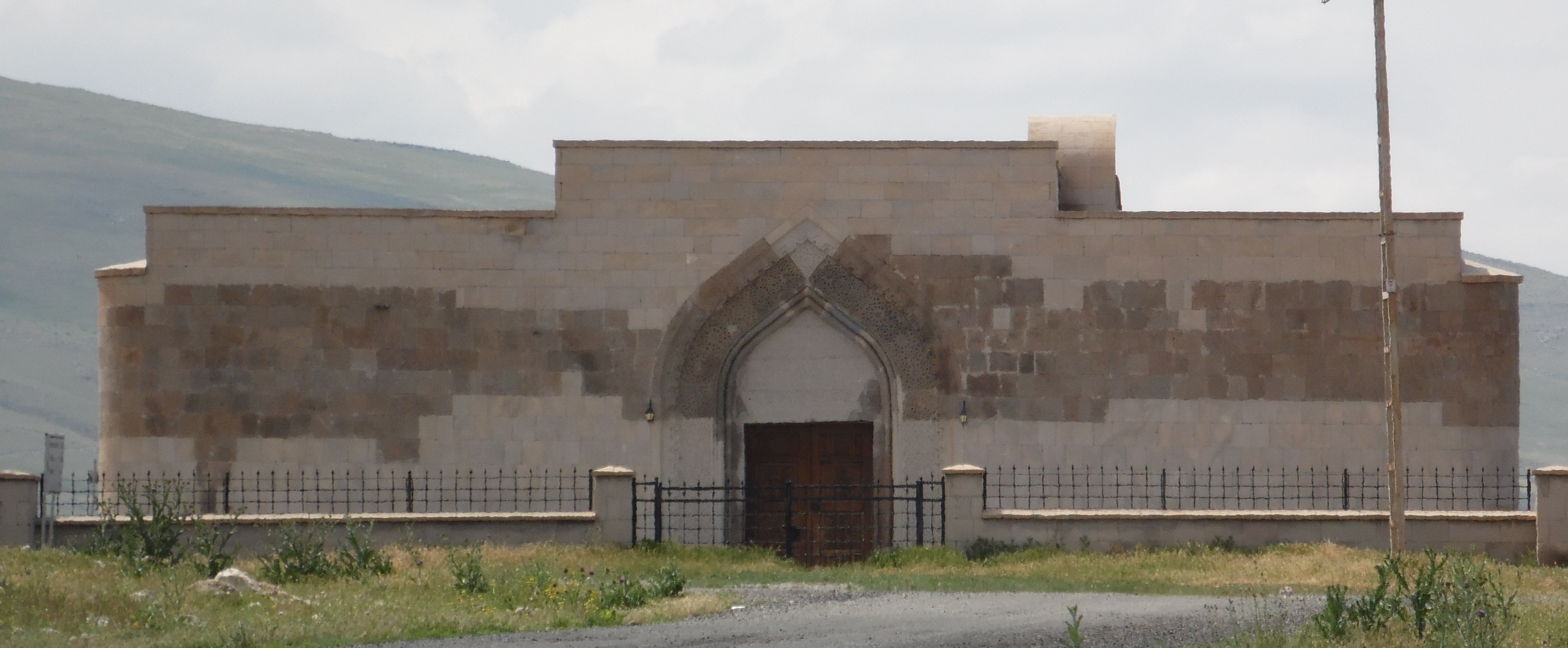
- Entrance of the caravanserai
- Alternative names: Iğdır Kervansarayı

General information
- Type: Caravanserai
- Architectural style: Armenian architecture
- Location: Iğdır, Turkey
- Completed: 13th century

Design and construction
- Architect(s): Ashot

The Caravanserai of Zor (Armenian: Զորի քարավանատուն; Turkish: Iğdır Kervansarayı) is a 13th-century Armenian caravanserai located 35 kilometers southwest of modern-day Iğdır. Built during the period of Zakarid Armenia, it was commissioned by the Zakarian-Mkhargrdzeli princes and designed by an Armenian architect named Ashot. It was an important stop in the trade routes to the city of Ani and the Silk Road.

Its architectural style is connected to those of the churches and caravanserais in Ani and the Aragatsotn Province of Armenia of the period. It also shows similarities to Seljuk architecture, showing the growing influence of Armenian architecture on the Seljuk empire. The present-day structure is a result of a controversial restoration by the Turkish government.

== History ==
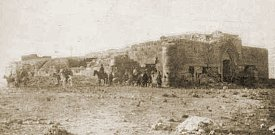
The caravanserai in 1913

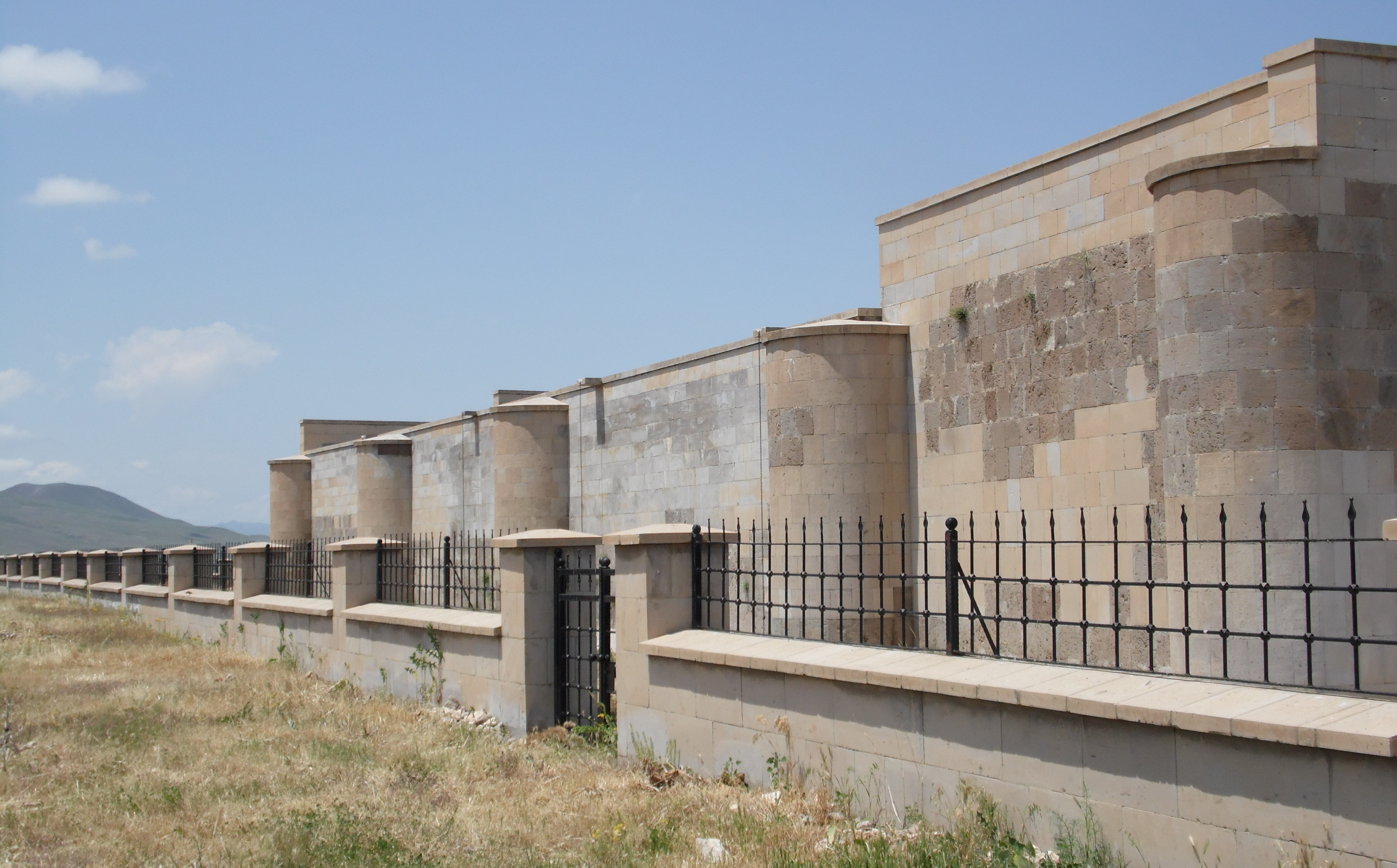
External walls of the caravanserai

Most scholars state that the Caravanserai of Zor was commissioned in the 13th century by the Zakarid princes of Armenia. On the other hand, French art historian Jean-Michel Thierry believes that the caravanserai was commissioned by the Mongols during the period of Mongol Armenia and was built by an Armenian architect. Certain Turkish authors have attempted to attribute the building to the Seljuks, however, this hypothesis has been widely rejected. The structure was built by the medieval Armenian architect Ashot. The Caravanserai was located on a road that served as an alternate route to Ani, that diverged from the traditional Erzurum-Tabriz route, and was also linked to trade routes from the south that connected the Lake Van region to the silk road.

The structure was first studied by the Armenian archaeologist Ashkarbek Loris-Kalantar in 1913, who gave it the name “Zor” after the nearby village of Zor, 15 kilometers away. Its original name is unknown. Loris-Kalantar noted an inscription in Arabic, carved on the ceiling of the southern room, that said "Constructed by Ashot.” The only surviving inscription is Russian graffiti dating back to 1845.

== Architecture ==
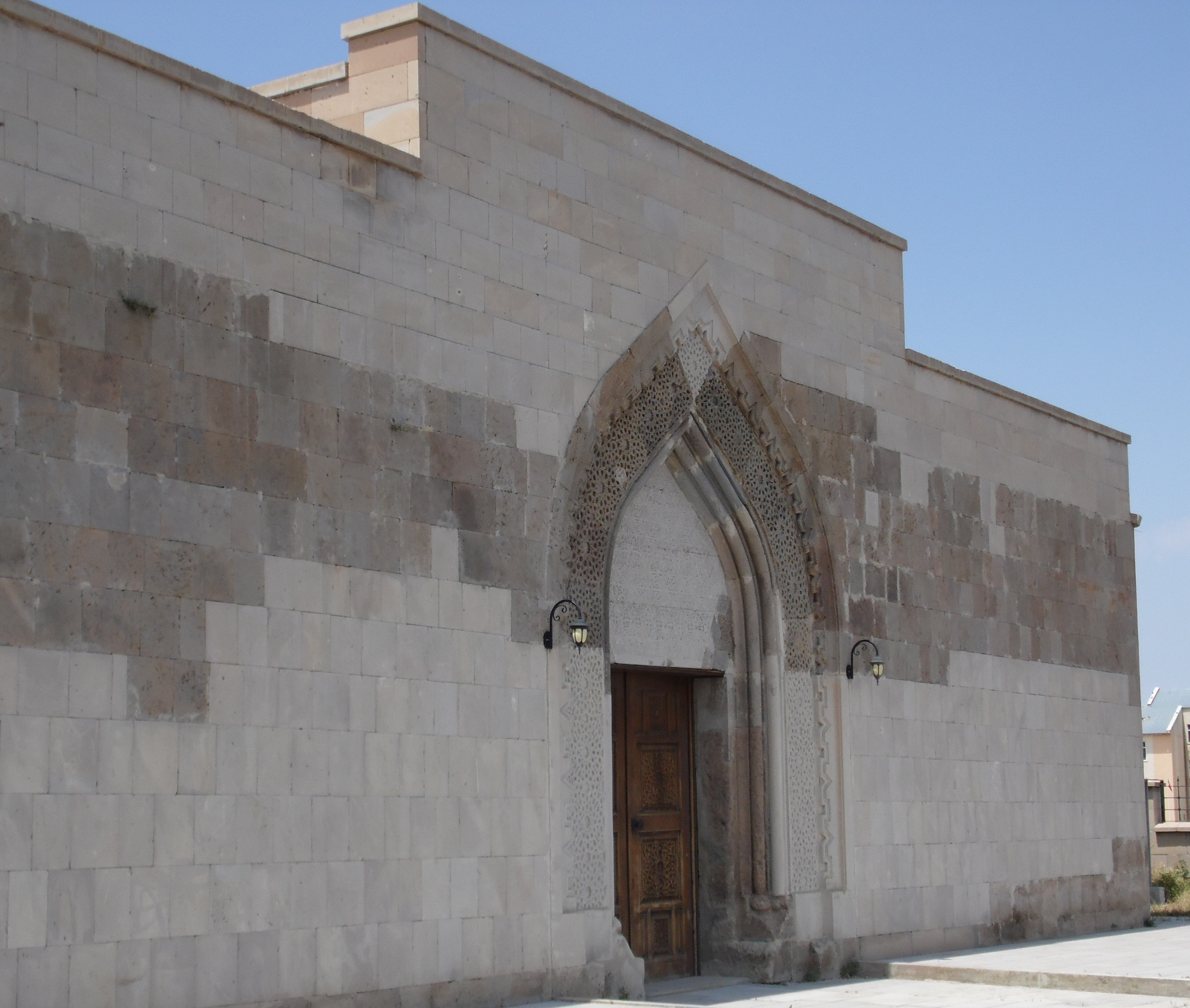
Side view of entrance portal

Archaeologist Loris-Kalantar describes the caravanserai as “a rare and exceptional example of Armenian medieval art and architecture.” The architecture resembles that of the Aruch and Talin caravanserais in Armenia, while the entrance portal resembles that of Armenian church architecture, especially the Tigran Honents and Holy Apostles churches in Ani. In addition, these styles show similarities with Seljuk constructions to the west, showing the influence of Armenian architecture in the architectural style of the Seljuks in Anatolia. The masonry of the entrance portal is ornate, decorated with geometric stars, lacework, and three vaulted rooms similar to that found in Ani. The interior consists of a rectangular hall with two zones, an eastern and western chamber. The external walls each have five semicircular walls which may have served a defensive function. The caravanserai was completely renovated in 2008 as part of an initiative by the Turkish government to increase tourism in the region.

== See also ==
- List of caravanserais in Armenia

== Bibliography ==
- Ani, Virtual (2006). "Zor caravanserai". virtualani.org.
- Bayat, Gülşen (2019). Akkuş, Gülizar; Erciş, Mehmet (eds.). Rural Tourism Potential of Igdir. Selected Studies on Rural Tourism and Development. Newcastle: Cambridge Scholars Publishing. p. 61. ISBN 978-1-5275-0793-7.
- Cowe, S. Peter (2016). "Patterns of Armeno-Muslim Interchange on the Armenian Plateau in the Interstice between Byzantine and Ottoman Hegemony". In Peacock, A.C.S.; De Nicola, Bruno (eds.). Islam and Christianity in Medieval Anatolia. United Kingdom: Routledge. p. 117. ISBN 9781317112686.
- Eastmond, Anthony (2017). Tamta's World: The Life and Encounters of a Medieval Noblewoman from the Middle East to Mongolia. Cambridge, United Kingdom: Cambridge University Press. pp. 169, 297. ISBN 9781316739174.
- Franklin, Kate (2021). "Traveling through Armenia: Caravan Inns and the Material Experience of the Silk Road". Everyday Cosmopolitanisms: Living the Silk Road in Medieval Armenia (1 ed.). Oakland: University of California Press. p. 96. ISBN 978-0-520-38093-6. JSTOR j.ctv2rb75kr.10.
- Hakobyan, Tadevos Kh.; Melik-Bakhshyan, Stepan T.; Barseghyan, Hovhannes Kh. (1986). Հայաստանի և հարակից շրջանների տեղանունների բառարան [Dictionary of Toponyms of Armenia and Adjacent Territories] (in Armenian). Vol. 2. Yerevan State University Press. p. 319. OCLC 65130496.
- Kalantar, Ashkharbek (1994). Karakhanian, G. (ed.). Armenia: From the Stone Age to the Middle Ages. Civilisations du Proche Orient. Vol. 2. Translated by Gurxzadyan, V. G. Neuchâtel, Paris: Recherches et Publications. pp. 73–74. ISBN 978-2-940032-01-3.
- Rogers, J.M. (1976). "The Mxargrdzelis between East and West". Bedi Kartlisa. 34. Paris: Editions du Centre National de la Recherche Scientifique: 315–326. ISSN 0373-1537.
- Thierry, Jean-Michel (1985). "A Propos de Quelques Monuments Chrétiens du Vilayet de Kars (IV)". Revue des Études Arméniennes (in French). 19. France: Sorbonne University: 293–307. doi:10.2143/REA.19.0.2017280. ISSN 0080-2549.
