= Aghkend =

Aghkend may refer to:

- Aghnjadzor, Armenia
- Ashotavan, Armenia
