= Talin Caravansarai =

Medieval ruins near Talin

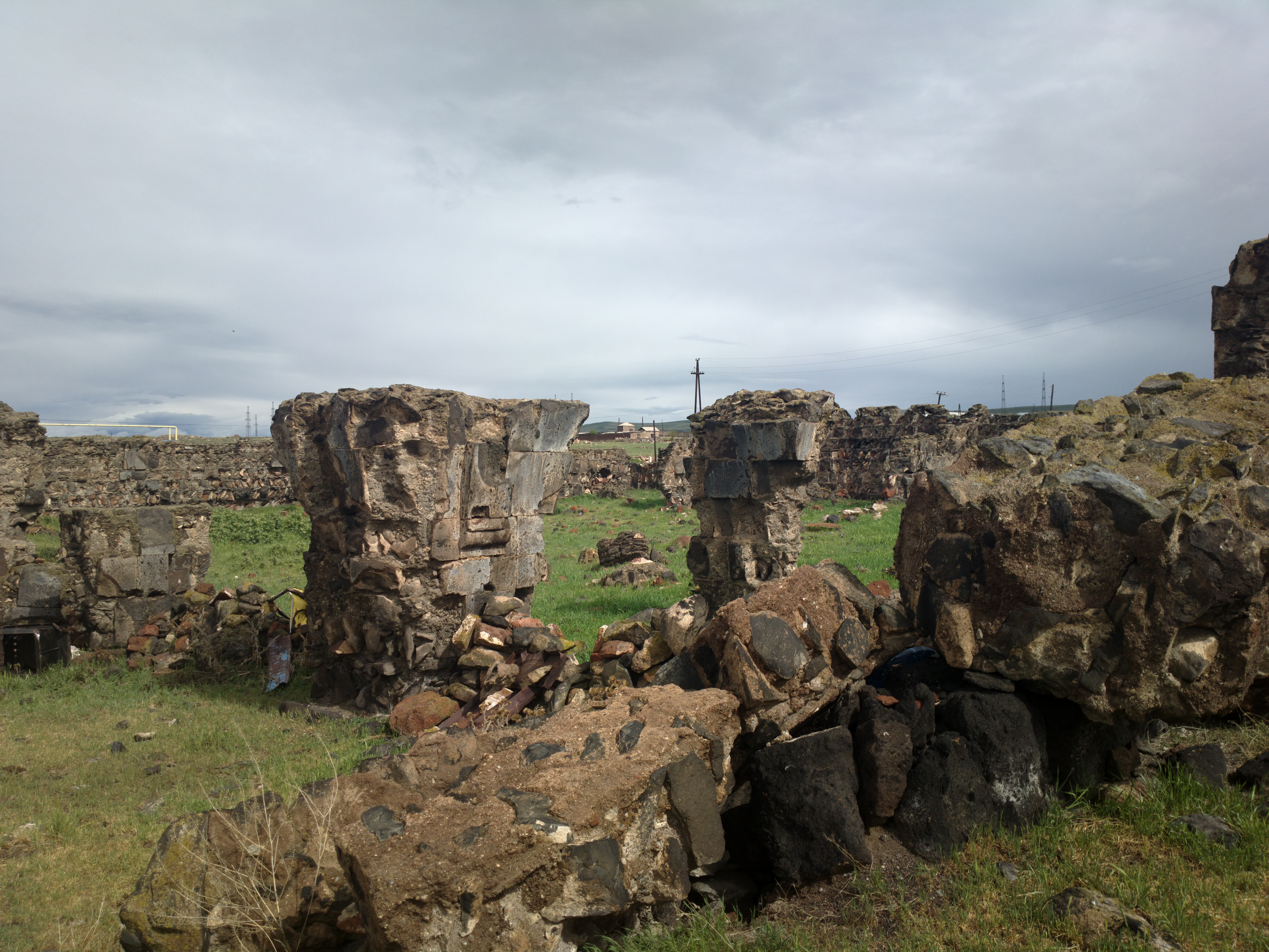
Caravansarai ruins near Talin

The Talin Caravansarai was a 13th century caravansarai located south of Talin, Armenia. The structure dates to the period of the Zakarid Dynasty and was a component of the Seljuk-inspired caravansarai network built by the Zakarids. This network was intended to draw trade towards Ani, and it also included sites like the Aruch Caravansarai. The rectangular structure near Talin is considered large for its type, and it consists of a central common area flanked by two dormitory-like structures. It is a ruin in the modern period.

== See also ==
- List of caravanserais in Armenia
