= Jrapi Caravansarai =

Structure in Jrapi

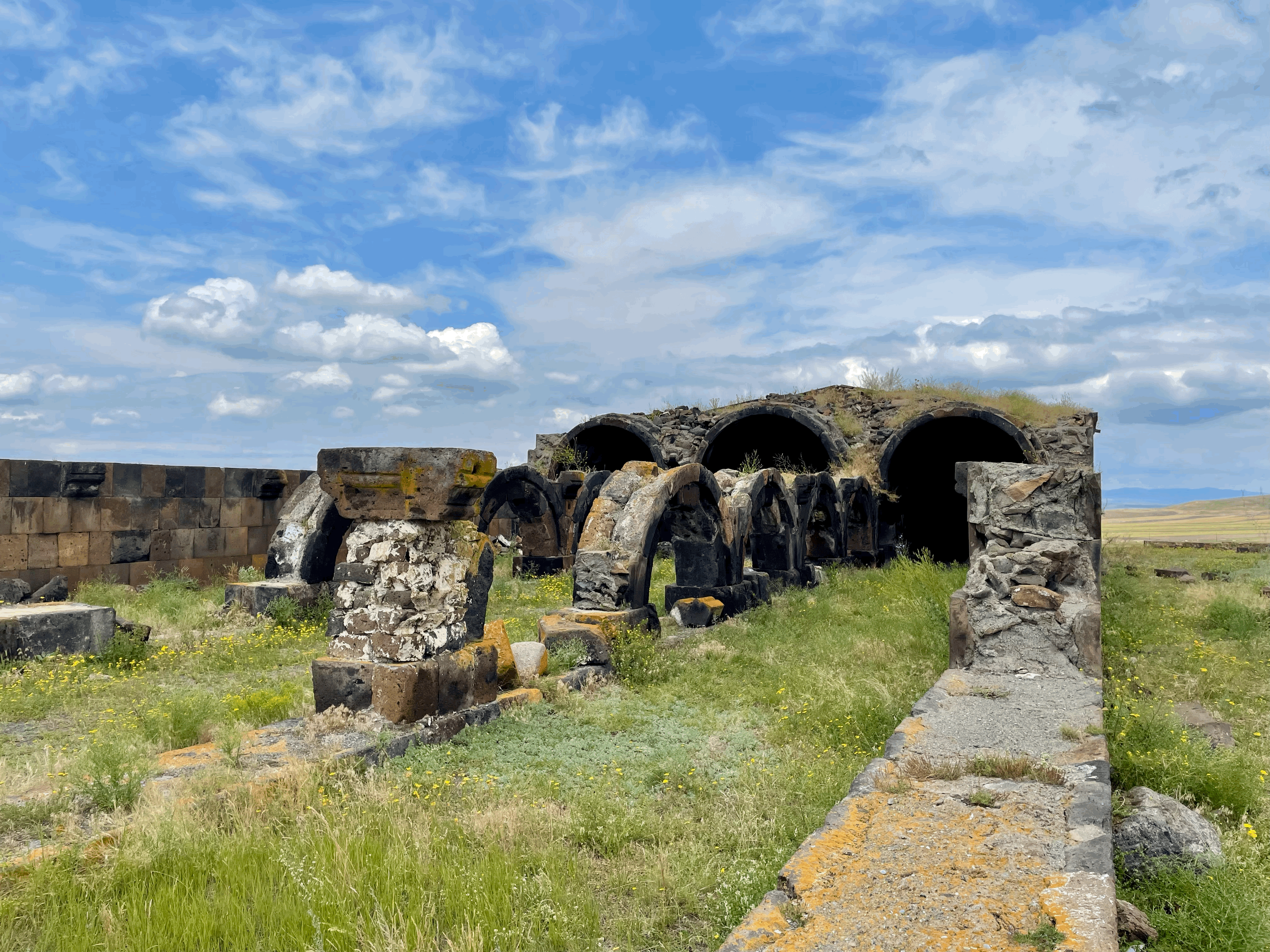

The Jrapi Caravansarai is a medieval caravansarai located near Jrapi, Armenia. The Jrapi structure is similar to the Aruch Caravansarai, with the latter featuring stone arches, three parallel chambers, and a single entrance for people and animals. In the 1970s, the Jrapi Caravansarai was moved in its entirety to its current location due to the damming of the Akhurian River. The caravansarai is currently adjacent to two medieval church buildings.

== See also ==
- List of caravanserais in Armenia
