= Aruchavank =

Historical church in Armenia

Aruchavank Արուճավանք
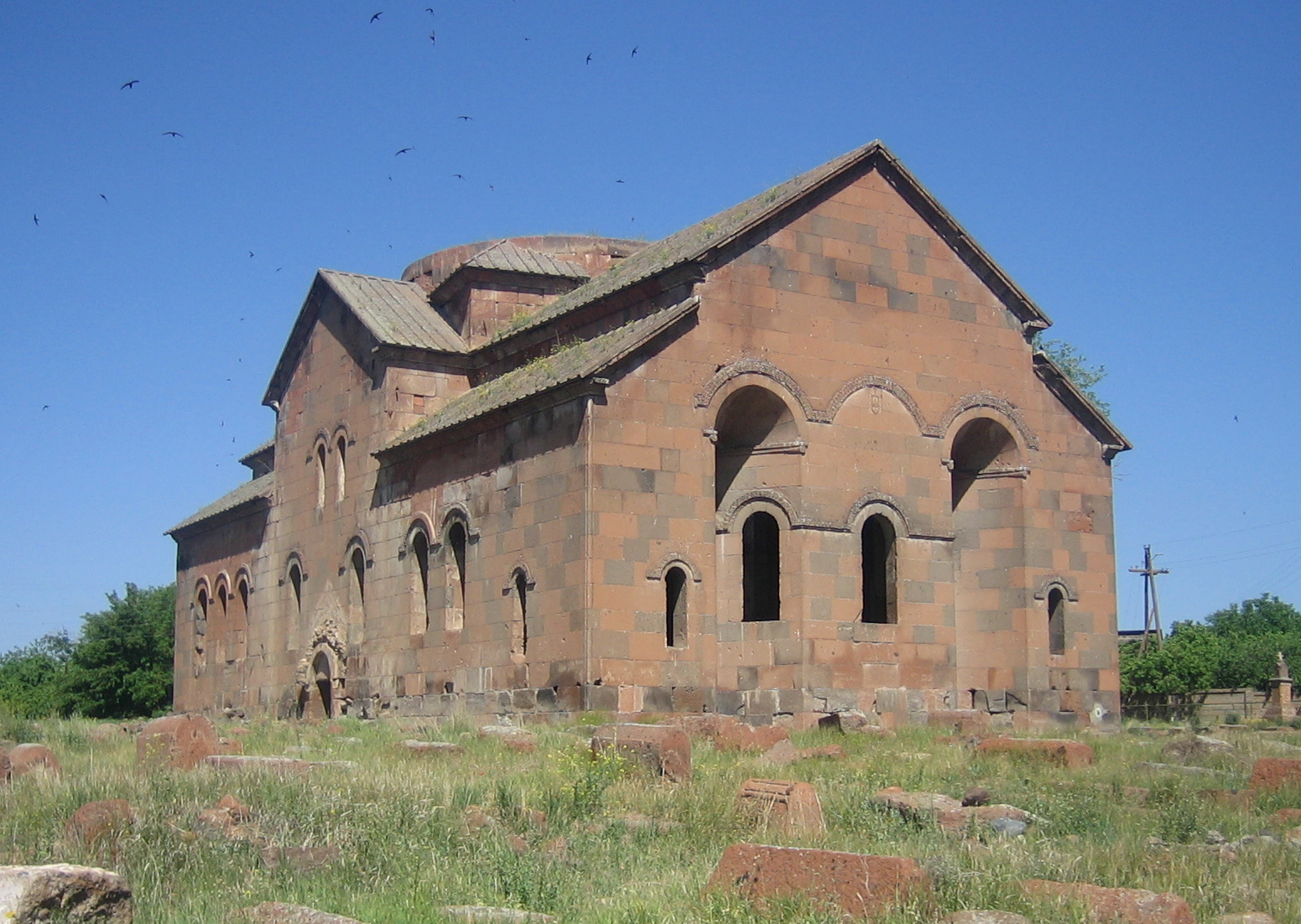
- The Church of Aruch with collapsed dome, 2008.

- Location within Armenia Location within Aragatsotn

Religion
- Affiliation: Armenian Apostolic Church

Location
- Location: Aruch, Aragatsotn Province, Armenia
- Coordinates: 40.289078°N 44.080572°E

Architecture
- Type: Domed hall single-nave basilica
- Style: Armenian
- Completed: 660s
- Dome: 1 (collapsed)

Aruchavank or the Cathedral of Aruch (Արուճավանք; also Surb Grigor) is situated on a rocky plateau at the western foot of Mount Aragats in the village of Aruch in the Aragatsotn Province of Armenia. According to wall inscriptions on the east wall and manuscripts written by historians Ghevond, Hovhannes Draskhanakerttsi, and Stepanos Asoghik, the church and adjoining building for residence (the palace) were commissioned by Prince Grigor Mamikonian and his wife Heghine/Heline between 661 and 682 AD. Architecturally it is one of the most important Armenian churches of the Middle Ages and also one of the largest.

== History ==
Aruch became a citadel in the later Middle Ages. The ruins of the palace were excavated in 1947 and between 1950 and 1952. The remains of two structures of the palace complex of Prince Grigor Mamikonian were found on the south side of the church of St. Grigor.

There is some controversy as to the exact date of the completion of this church because of the reference in the inscription to the reign of the Byzantine Emperor Constantine III (641). According to Marr, Haroutyunyan, and Manutcheryan, it is believed that there is confusion with the emperor Constans II (641-668).

The church was restored during 1946–1948, except for the drum and cupola. The church had been extensively damaged by earthquakes and possibly by its use as a fortress in the 16th and 17th centuries (Oramanian, 1948).

== Architecture ==
Aruchavank is a domed hall single-nave basilica type structure. Its drum and dome have since collapsed prior to restoration efforts.

== Gallery ==
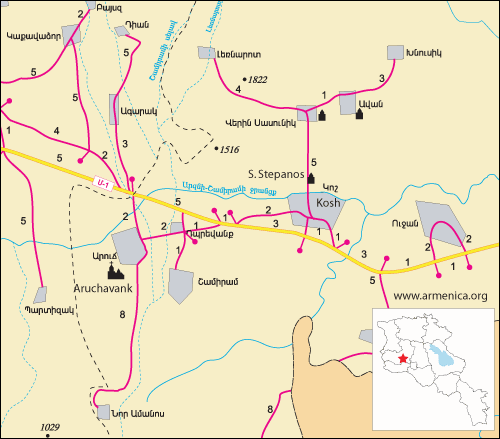
Map of Aruchavank and surrounding region.

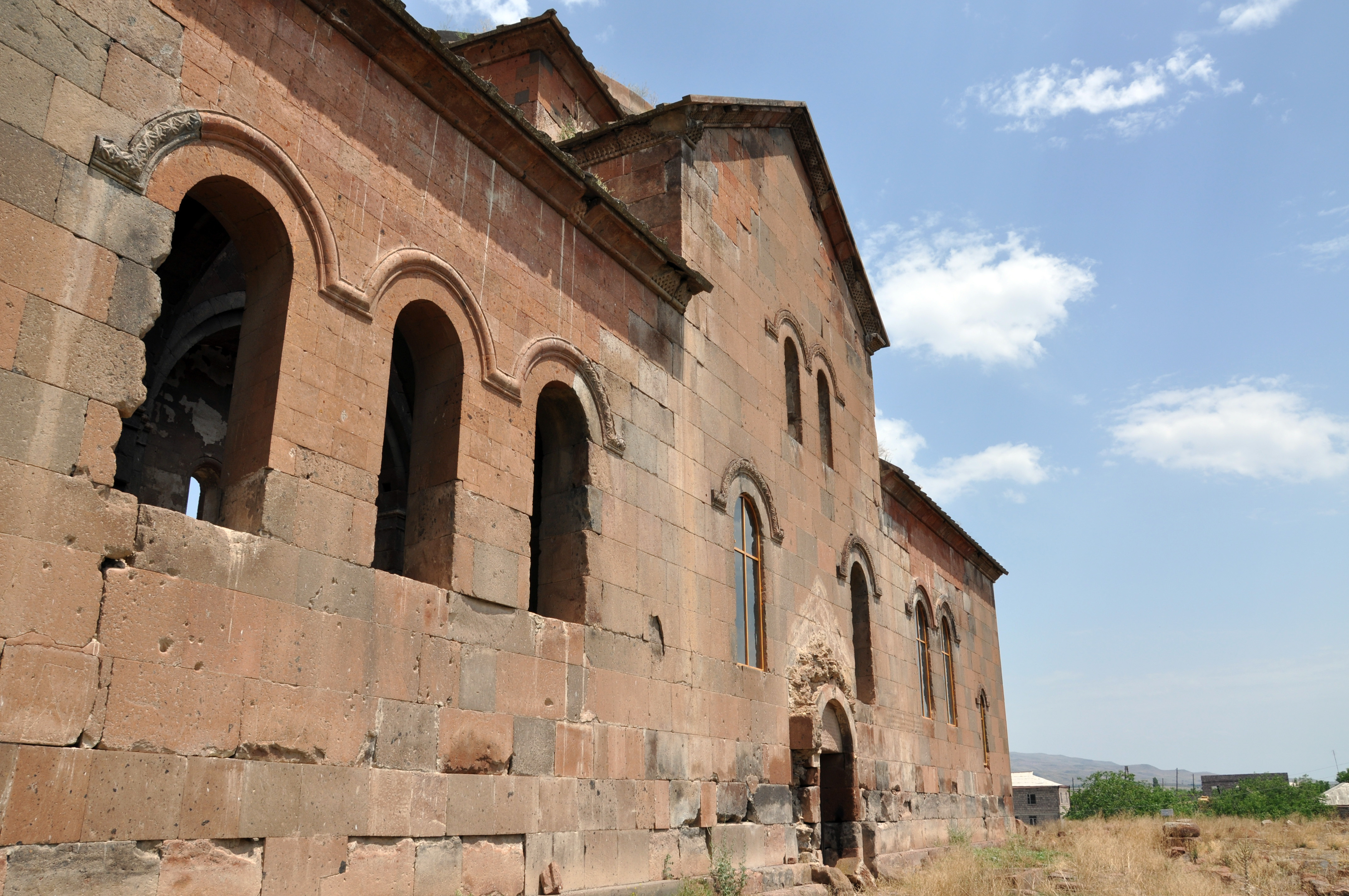
South façade of the cathedral.

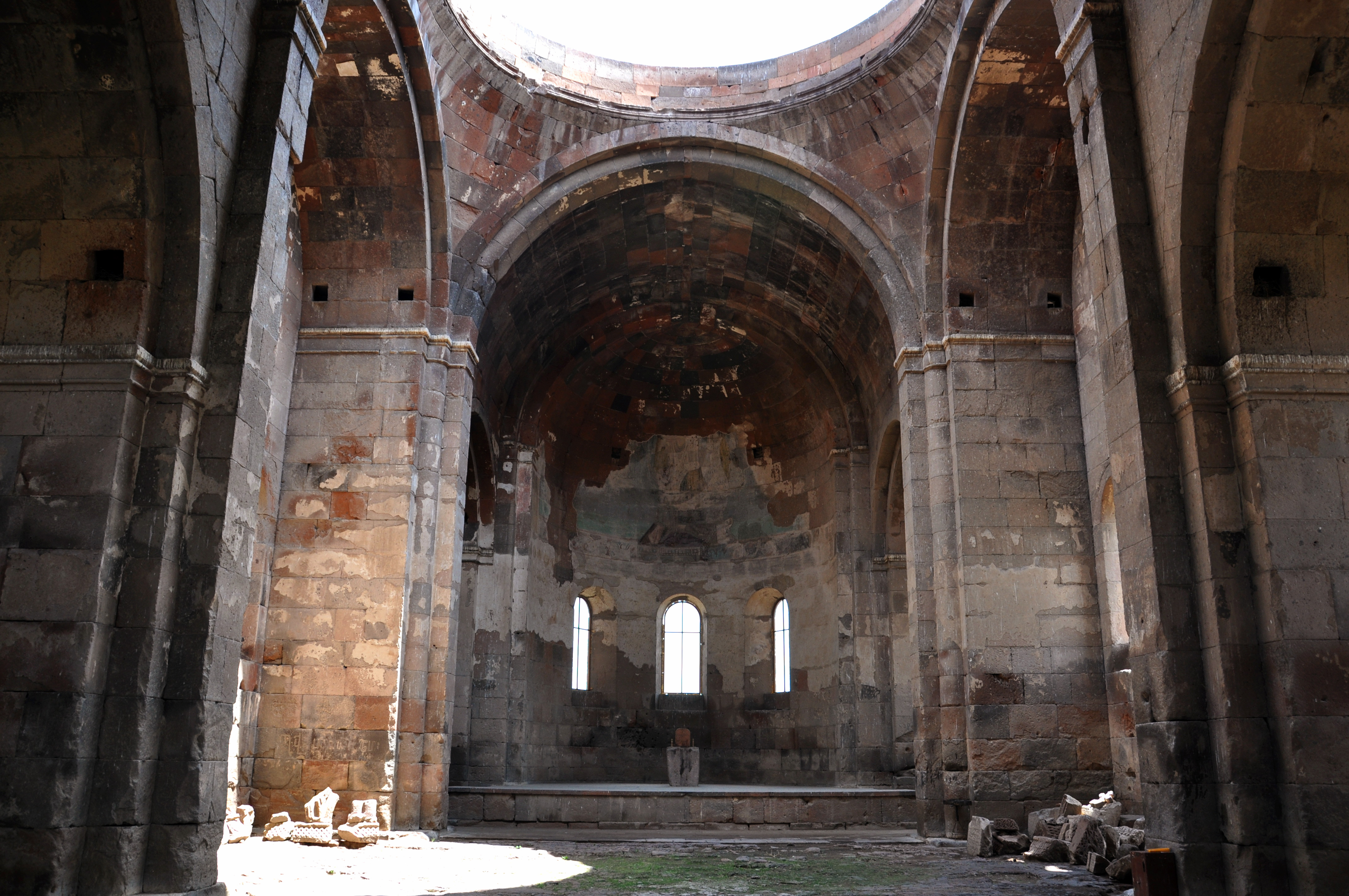
Apse of Aruch cathedral.

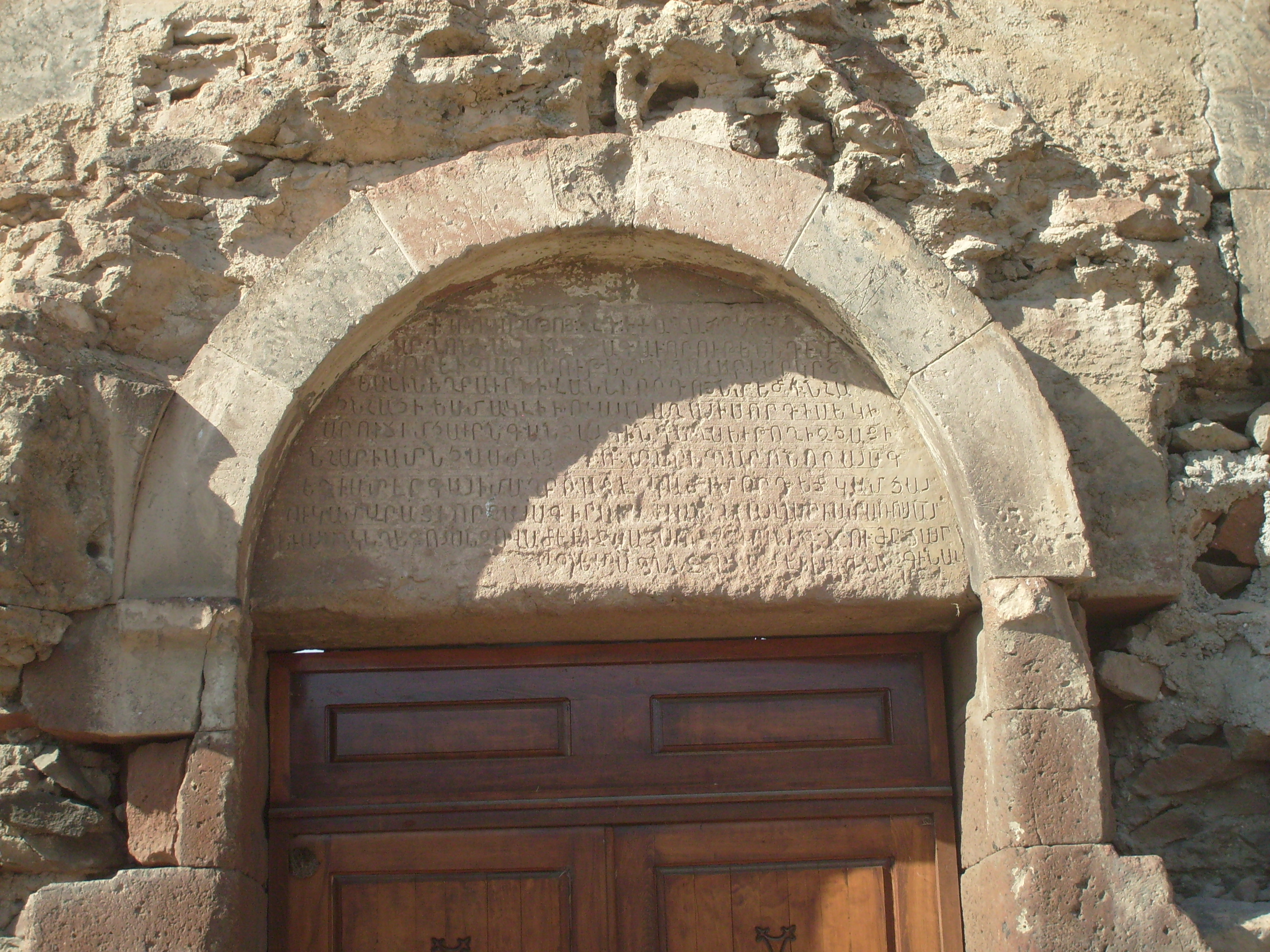
Inscription on the tympanum over the main portal.

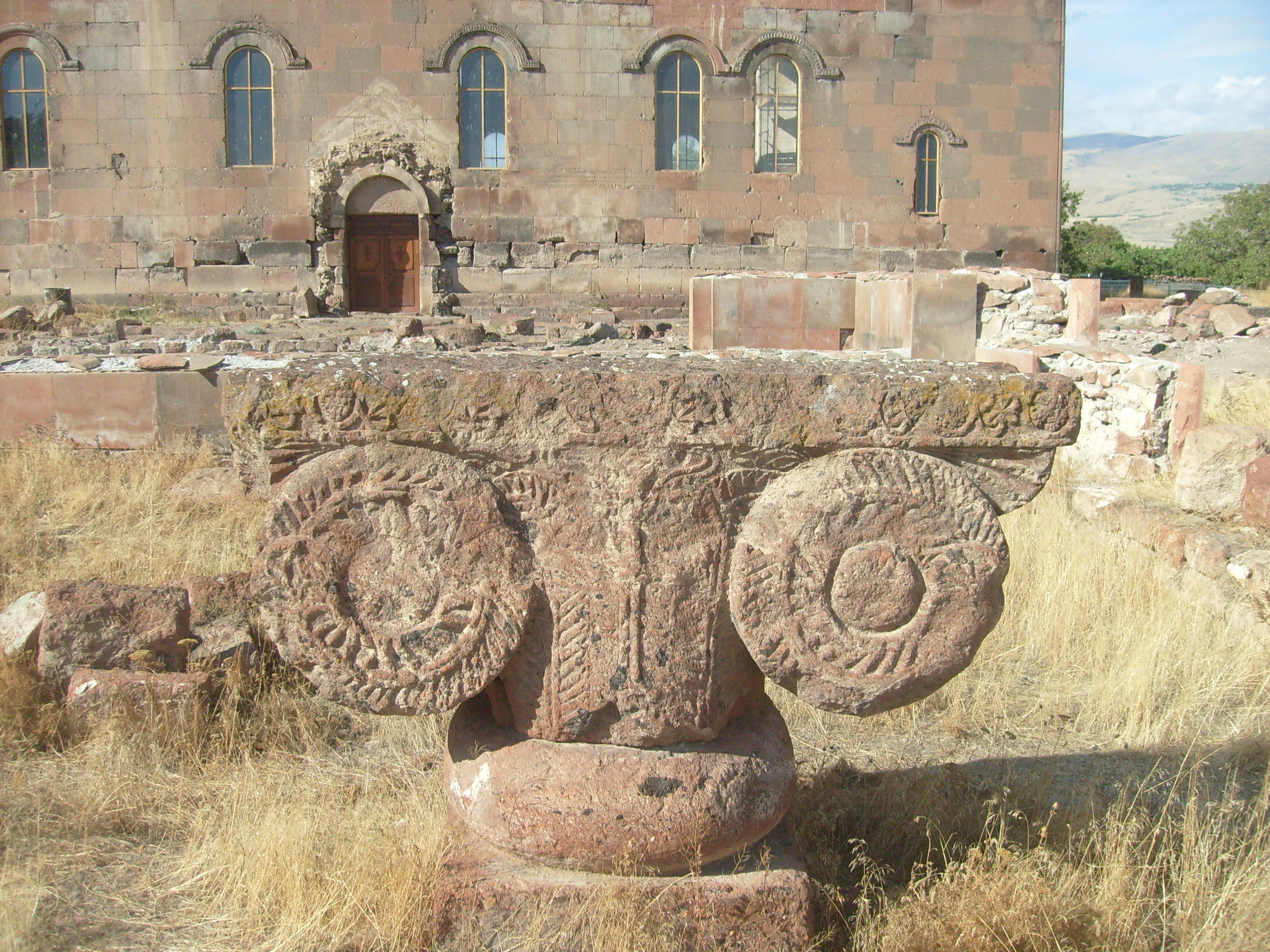
One of two capitals from the ruins just outside the church.
