= Geghasar =

Geghasar Գեղասար
- Location within Armenia
- Coordinates: 40°50′57″N 44°11′02″E
- Country: Armenia
- Marz (Province): Lori Province
- Elevation: 1,660 m (5,450 ft)

Population (2011)
  - Total: 916
- Time zone: UTC+4 ( )
  - Summer (DST): UTC+5 ( )

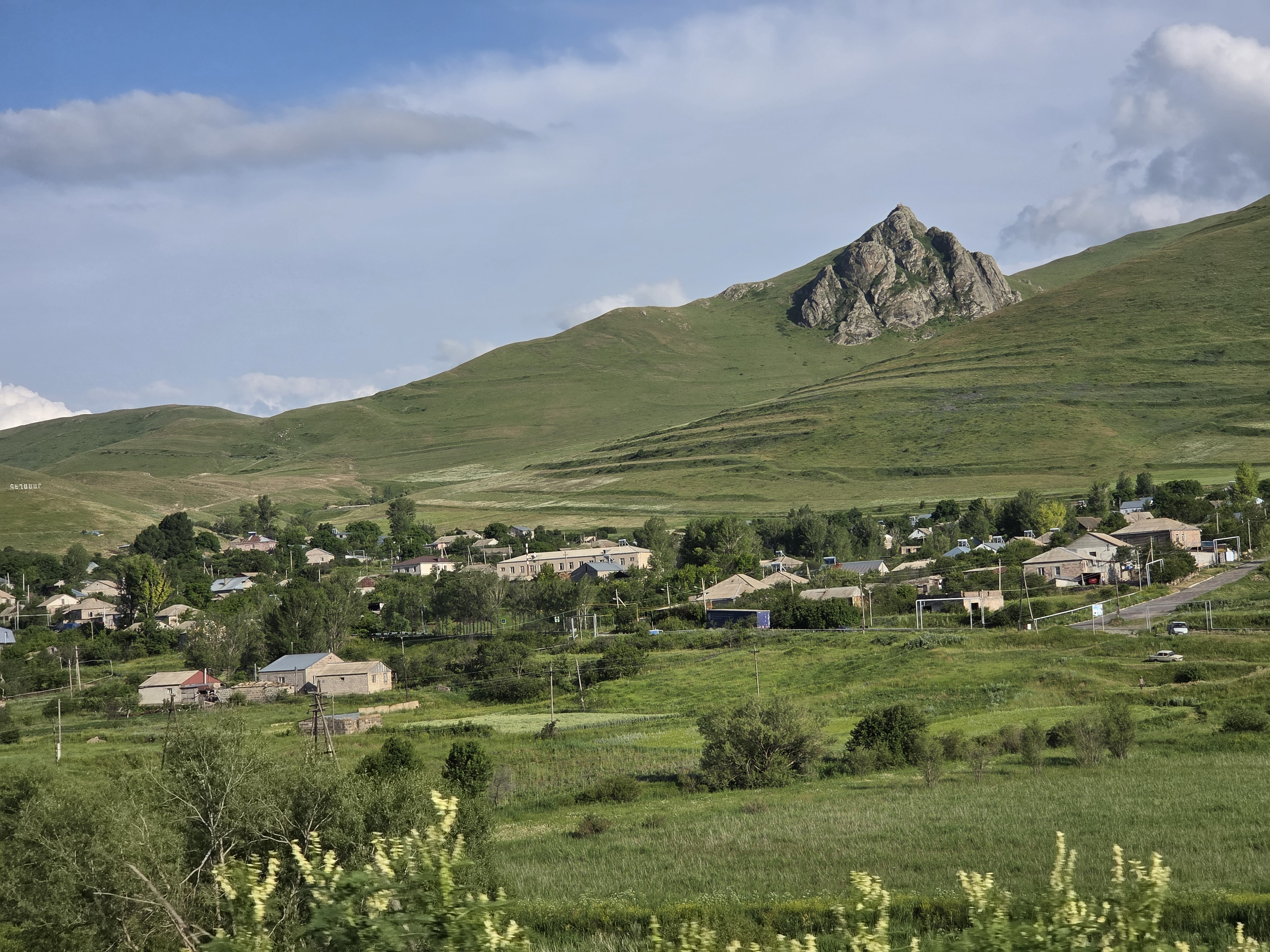
Village Geghasar

Geghasar (Armenian: Գեղասար) is a town in the Lori Province of Armenia.
