= Aruch Caravansarai =

13th century lodging

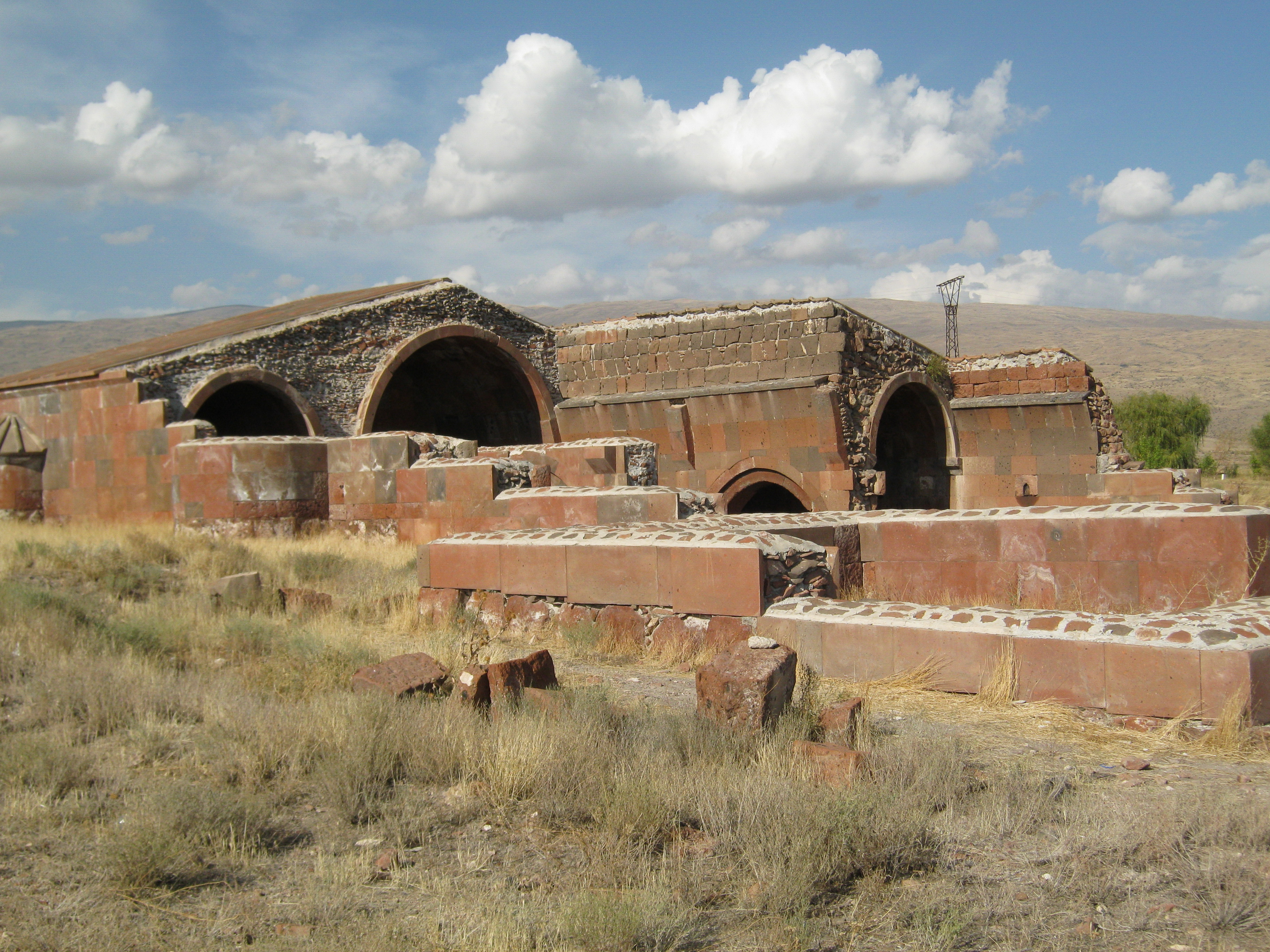
- Interactive map of the Aruch Caravansarai area

General information
- Location: Aruch, Armenia
- Coordinates: 40.30411°N 44.07723°E
- Year built: 13th century
- Renovated: 1960

Technical details
- Material: Stone
- Size: 450 m^{2}

The Aruch Caravansarai is a 13th century caravansarai near Aruch, Armenia. The site is a protected monument.

== Description ==
According to historian Antony Eastmond, the existence of a caravansarai in Aruch dates to the period of the Zakarid dynasty, during which time the Zakarids built a network of Seljuk-inspired caravansarais to draw trade towards Ani. Talin and Chrplu fell into this network alongside Aruch. Historian Anthony Bale described the current structure in Aruch as "beautiful" and built around a central hall where the animals could have been kept. He contrasted this caravansarai with more elaborate examples that accommodate human travelers on higher floors. Other elements of the structure include a single southern entrance, buttressed walls, and arches. Travel writers suggest that the Aruch caravansarai is possibly the most visible in Armenia given its prominent position near the M1 (Armenia) highway.

== Architecture ==
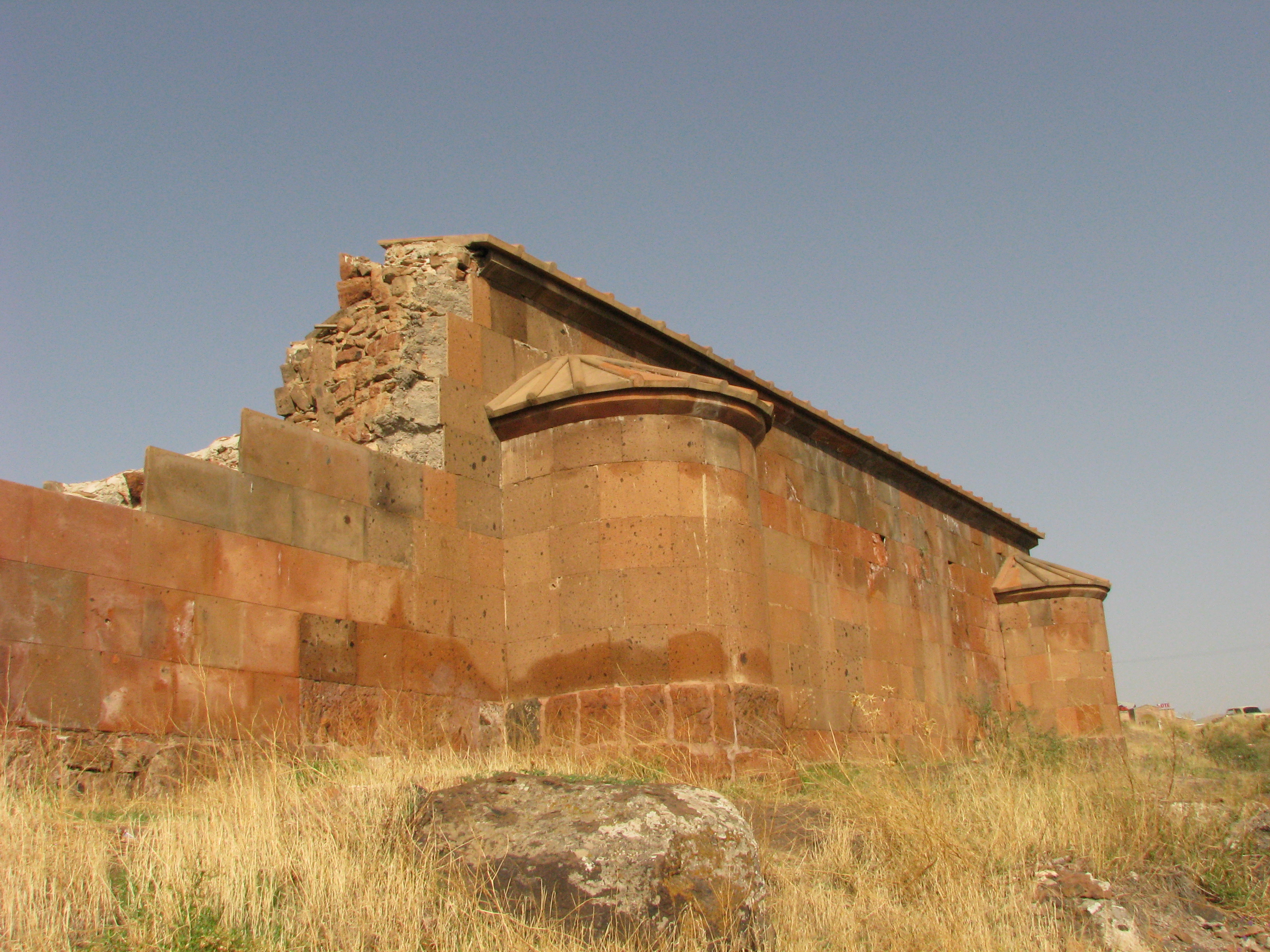
Round buttresses

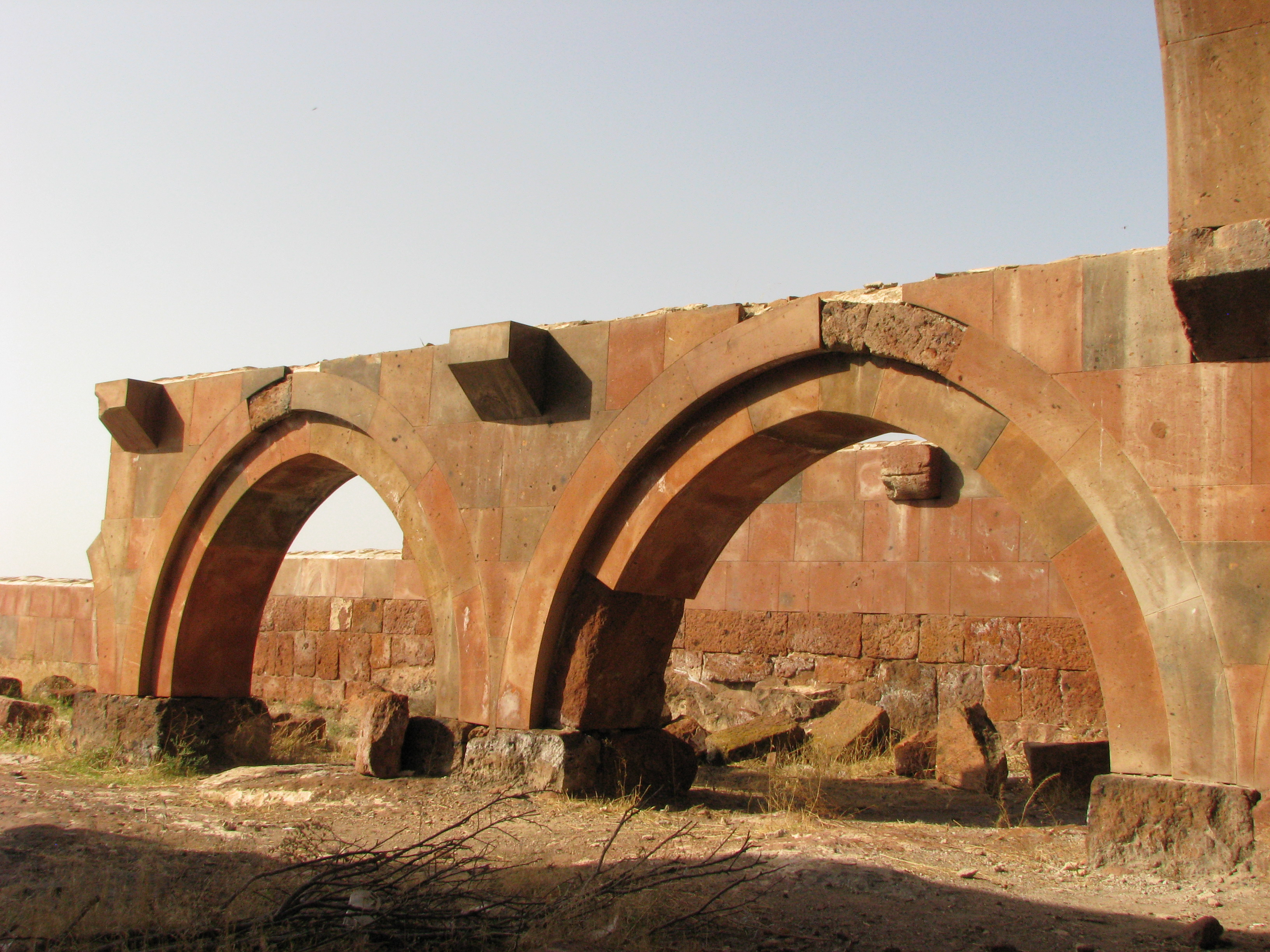
Interior arches

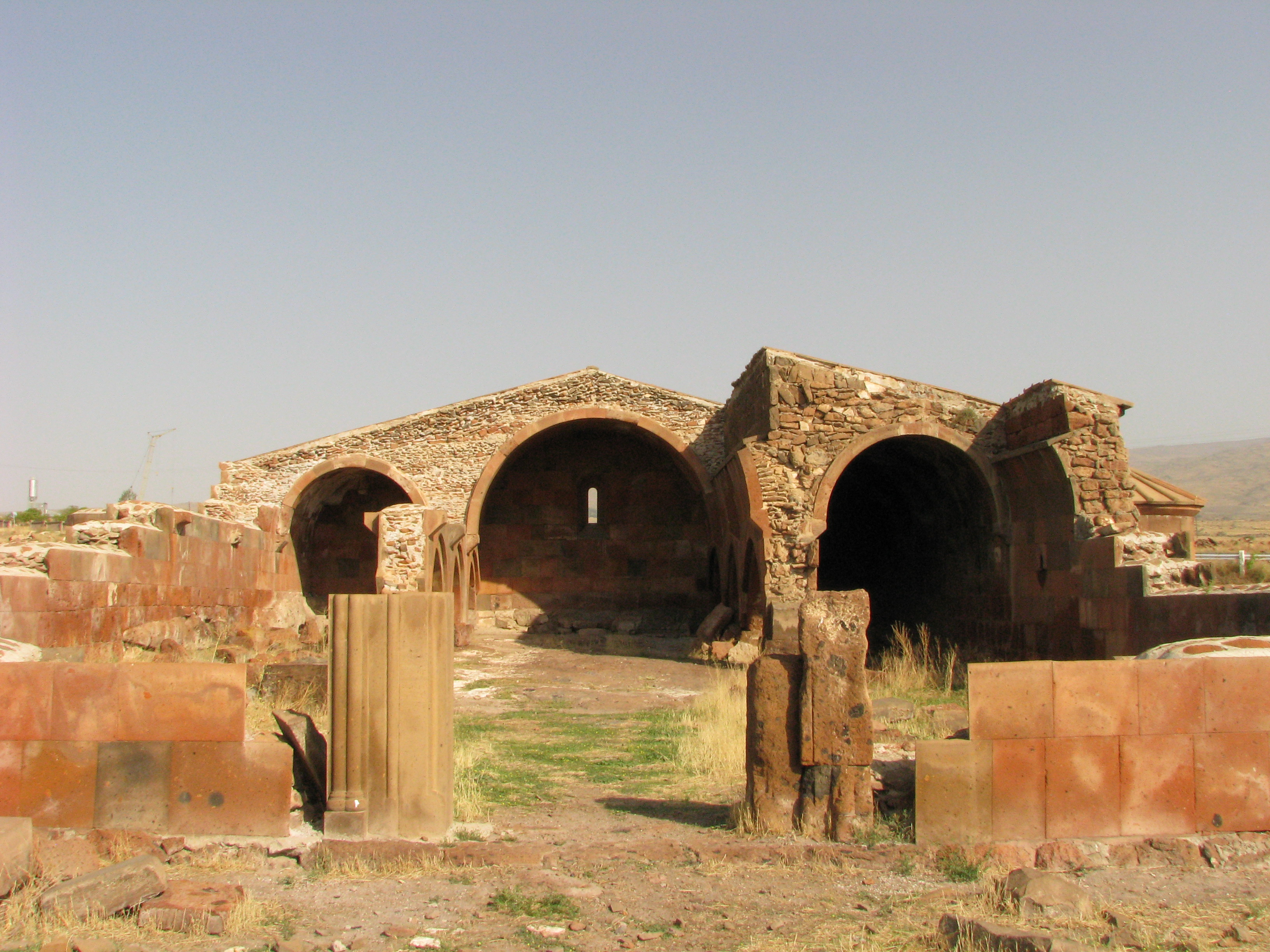
Entryway

== See also ==
- List of caravanserais in Armenia
