= Krasar =

Village in Shirak, Armenia

Krasar Կրասար
- Location within Armenia Location within Shirak
- Coordinates: 41°01′04″N 43°49′24″E
- Country: Armenia
- Province: Shirak
- Municipality: Ashotsk

Population (2011)
  - Total: 466
- Time zone: UTC+4
  - Summer (DST): UTC+5

Krasar (Armenian: Կրասար) is a village in the Ashotsk Municipality of the Shirak Province of Armenia. The village is mainly populated by Armenians but has a Kurdish minority.

== Demographics ==
The population of the village since 1897 is as follows:

Historical population
Year	Pop.	±% p.a.
1897	311	—
1926	349	+0.40%
1939	604	+4.31%
1959	350	−2.69%
1970	387	+0.92%
1979	352	−1.05%
2001	512	+1.72%
2011	466	−0.94%
