= Aghnjadzor =

Aghnjadzor Աղնջաձոր
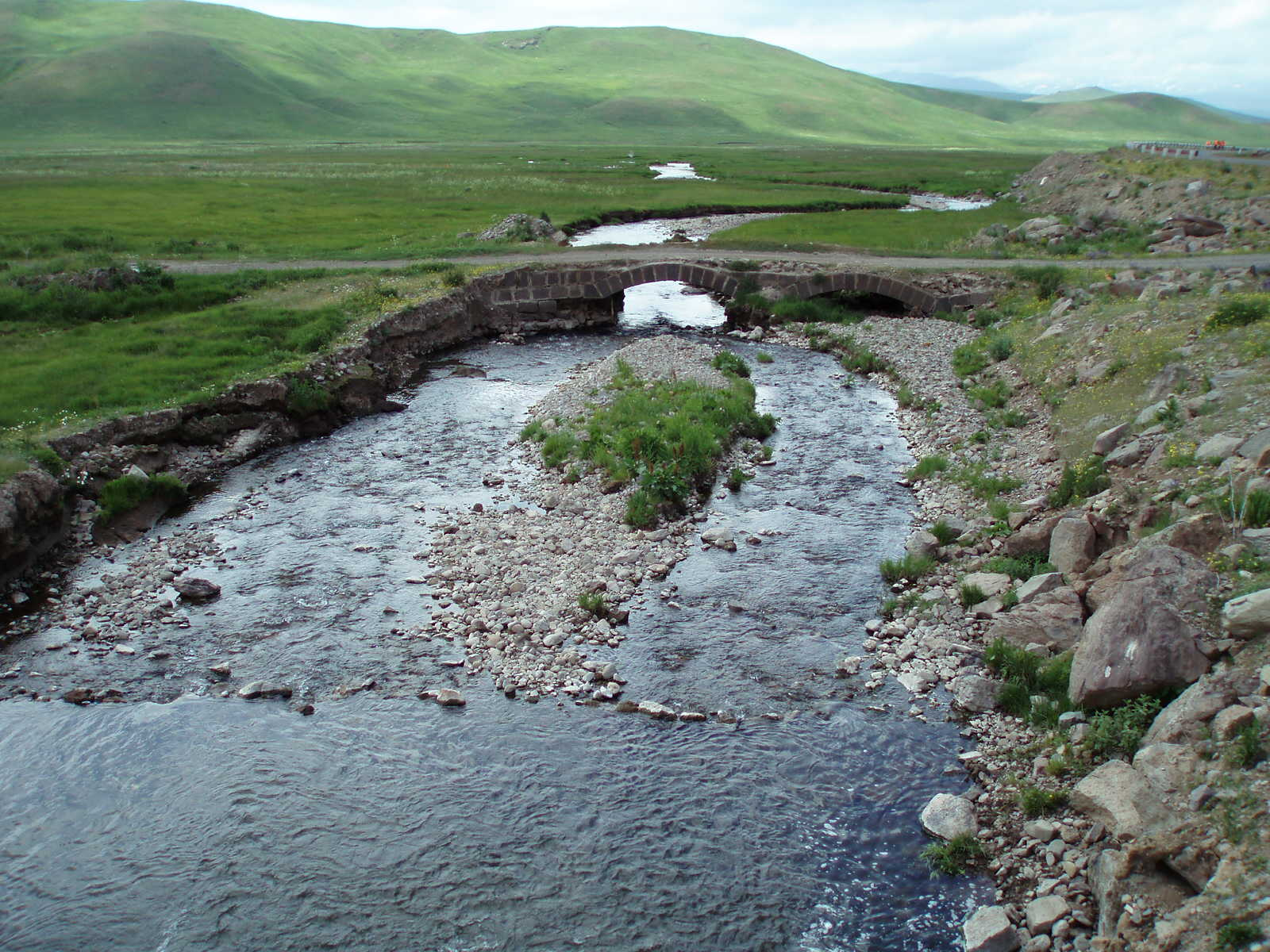
- Silk Road bridge at Selim Pass near Aghnjadzor

- Location within Armenia Location within Vayots Dzor
- Coordinates: 39°54′08″N 45°14′51″E
- Country: Armenia
- Province: Vayots Dzor
- Municipality: Yeghegis

Population (2011)
  - Total: 412
- Time zone: UTC+4 (AMT)

Aghnjadzor (Armenian: Աղնջաձոր; Azerbaijani: Ağkənd) is a village in the Yeghegis Municipality of the Vayots Dzor Province in Armenia. The village had a mixed population of Azerbaijanis and Armenians before the exodus of Azerbaijanis from Armenia after the outbreak of the Nagorno-Karabakh conflict.

== Cultural heritage ==
One kilometer north is the site of the notable Lernantsk Caravanserai, appearing east of the road like a half-buried Quonset hut. It was built at approximately the same period as Orbelian's Caravanserai, which is also located near the village, but Lernantsk Caravanserai is smaller in size and more crudely built. Four kilometres north are the ruins of Kapuyt Berd ("Blue Fortress").

== Gallery ==
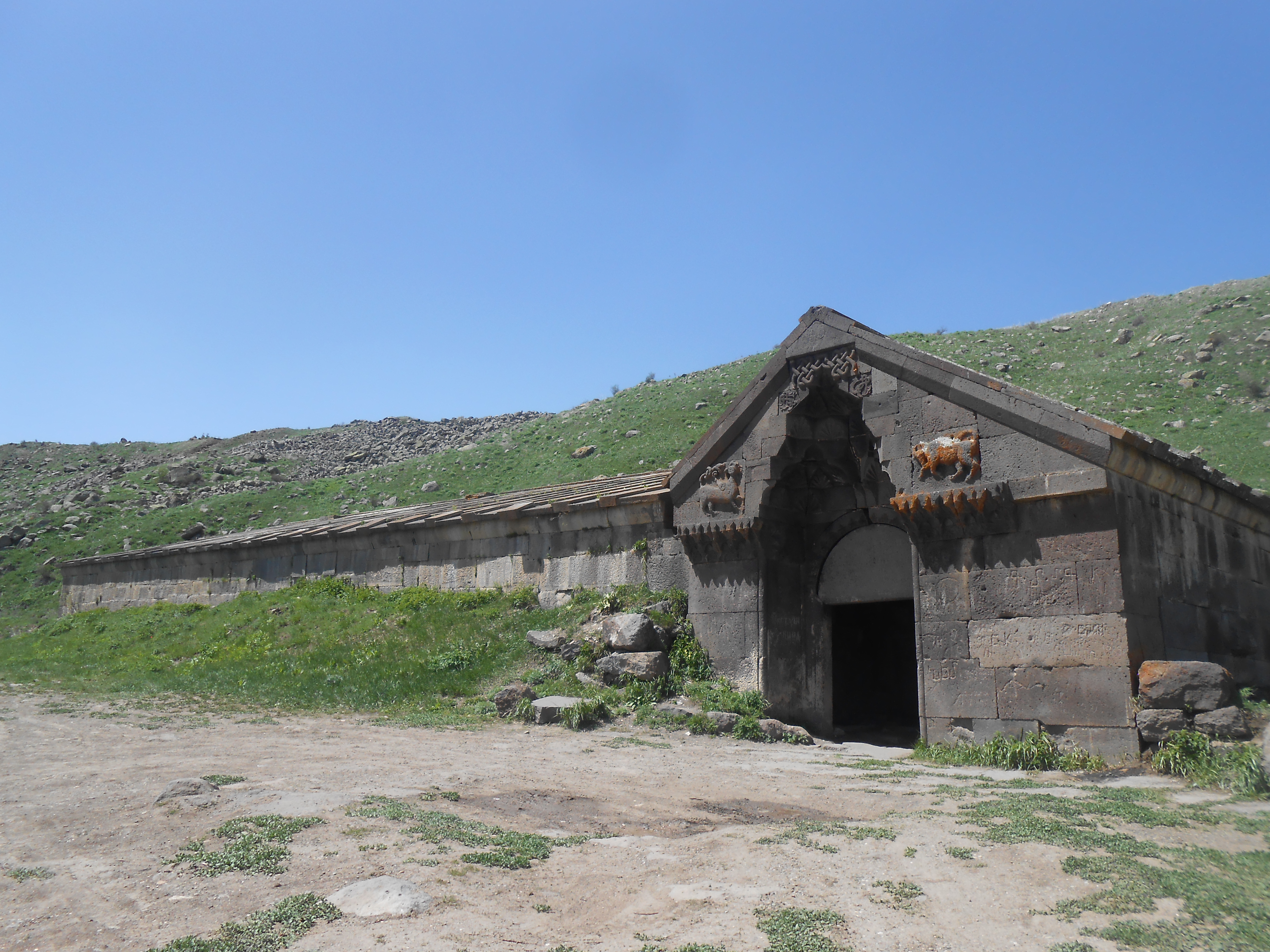
Orbelian's Caravanserai

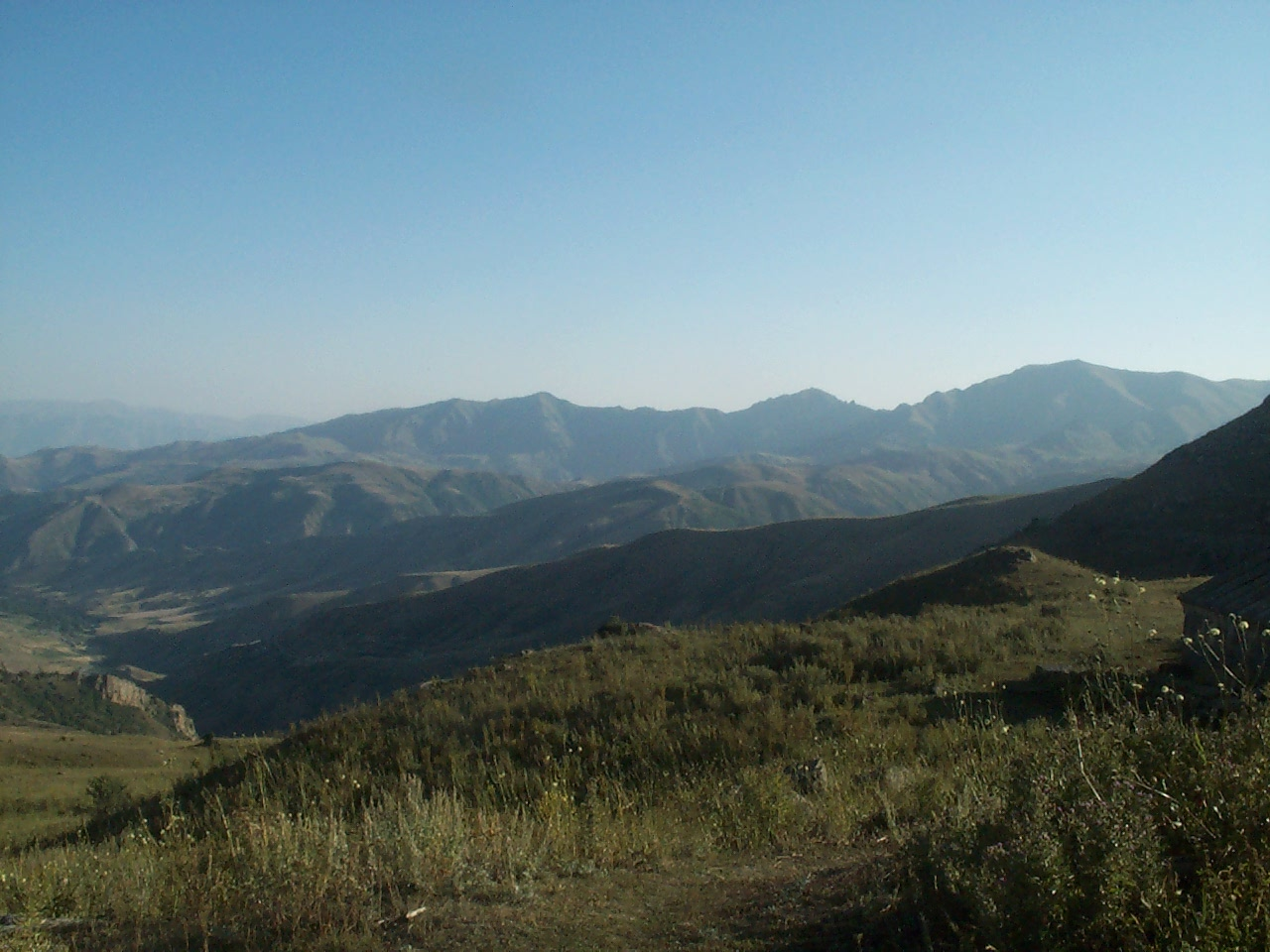
Scenery

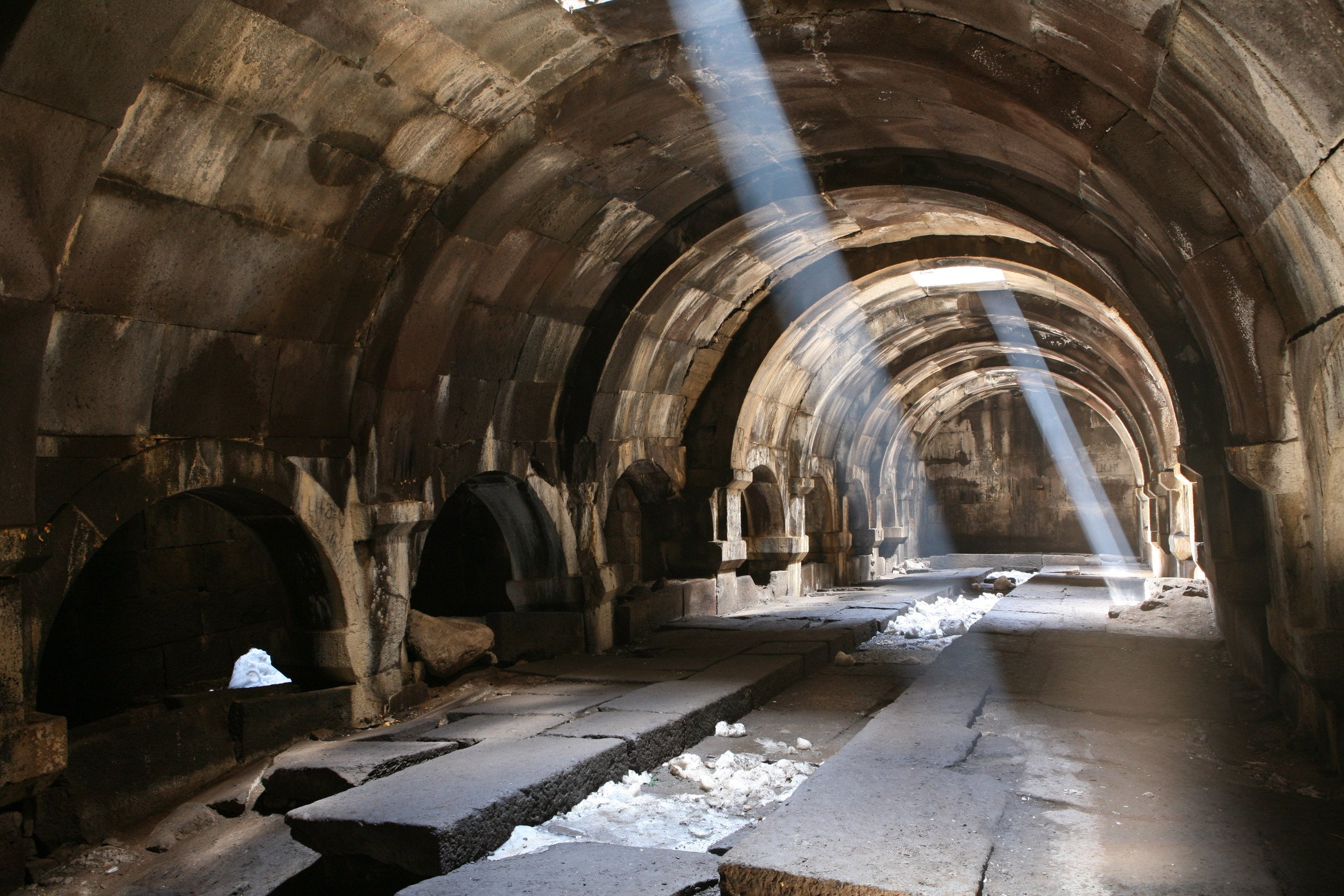
Inside Orbelian's Caravanserai

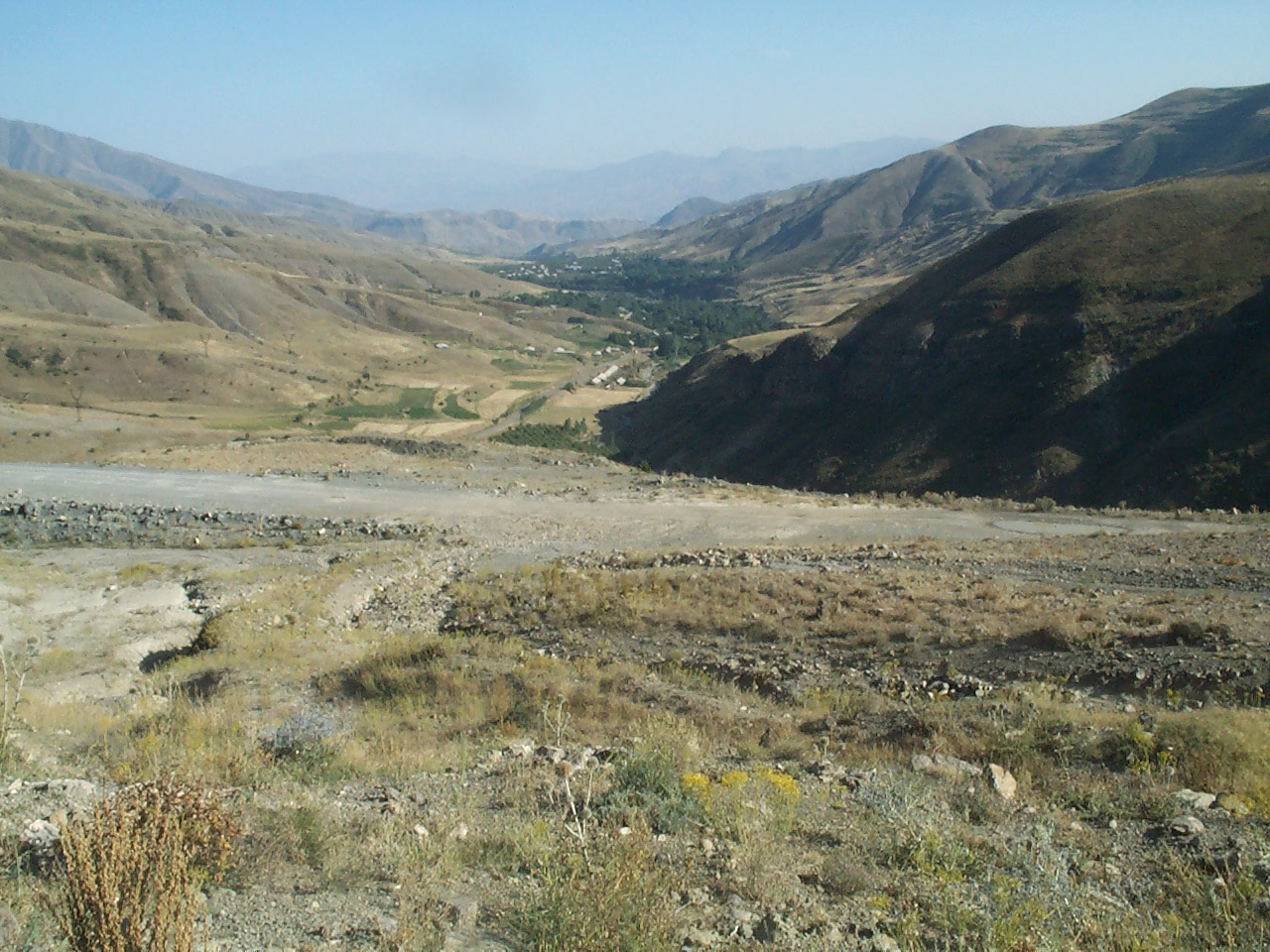
Scenery
