= Orbelian's Caravanserai =

14th-century caravanserai in Armenia

Orbelian’s Caravanserai
- Օրբելյանների Քարվանսարա
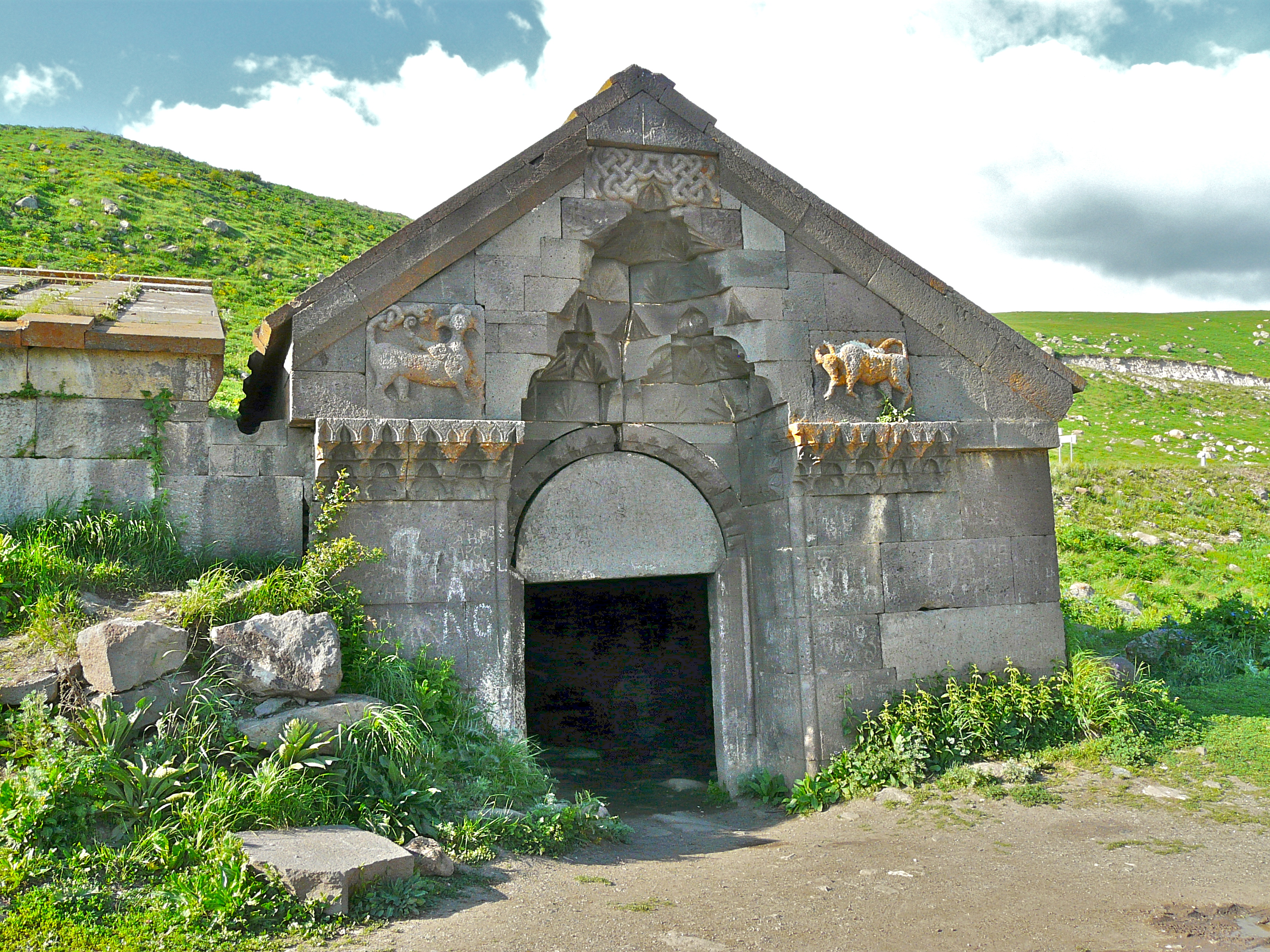
- Entrance of the caravanserai
- Alternative names: Selim Caravanserai

General information
- Type: Caravanserai
- Architectural style: Armenian architecture
- Location: Vayots Dzor, Armenia
- Coordinates: 39°56.97′N 45°14.20′E
- Completed: 1332

Orbelian's Caravanserai (Armenian: Օրբելյանների Քարվանսարա; also known as Selim Caravanserai, Armenian: Սելիմ), is a caravanserai in the Vayots Dzor Province of Armenia. It was built along the Vardenyats Mountain Pass (also known as the Selim Mountain Pass) in 1332, by prince Chesar Orbelian to accommodate weary travelers and their animals as they crossed from, or into, the mountainous Vayots Dzor region. Located at the southern side of Vardenyats Mountain Pass at a height of 2,410 metres (7,910 ft) above sea level, it has been described as perhaps the best-preserved caravanserai among Armenia's medieval monuments.

== Architecture ==
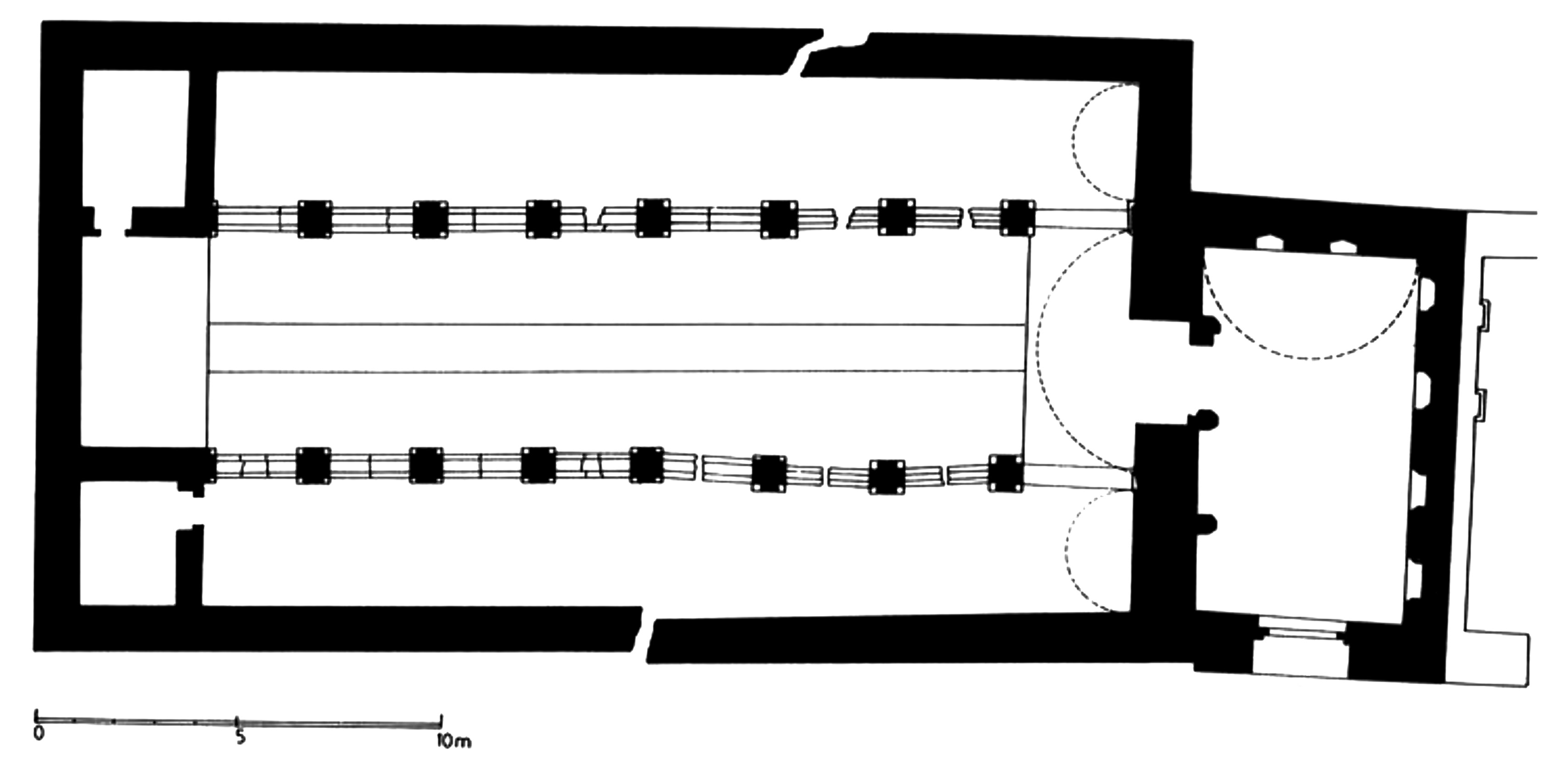
Plan of Orbelian's Caravanserai

The only entrance to the caravanserai is at the rectangular vestibule adjacent to the main hall of the structure. It has a gabled stone shingle roof that rests on three arches. On the eastern side, these arches rest upon the edges of the windows. The southern wall of the vestibule and the entry wall façade are the few locations in the caravanserai where there is any ornamentation. The entry has decorations around the half-rounded lintel, with high-reliefs of a winged animal (maybe a chimera) to the left, and a bull to the right, above the lintel. The only other decorations may be found around each of the oculi in the hall, which each have a unique design.

There are three inscriptions found on the vestibule, one is written in Persian, one in Arabic and the other is written in Armenian. The undated Persian inscription written upon the half-rounded lintel of the entrance was hastily cut into the stone and only partially legible, and while the Arabic inscription has been published, it is no longer legible and only faint traces remain. However, the Armenian inscription found at the eastern interior wall, just past the entrance to the upper right is legible and reads the following:

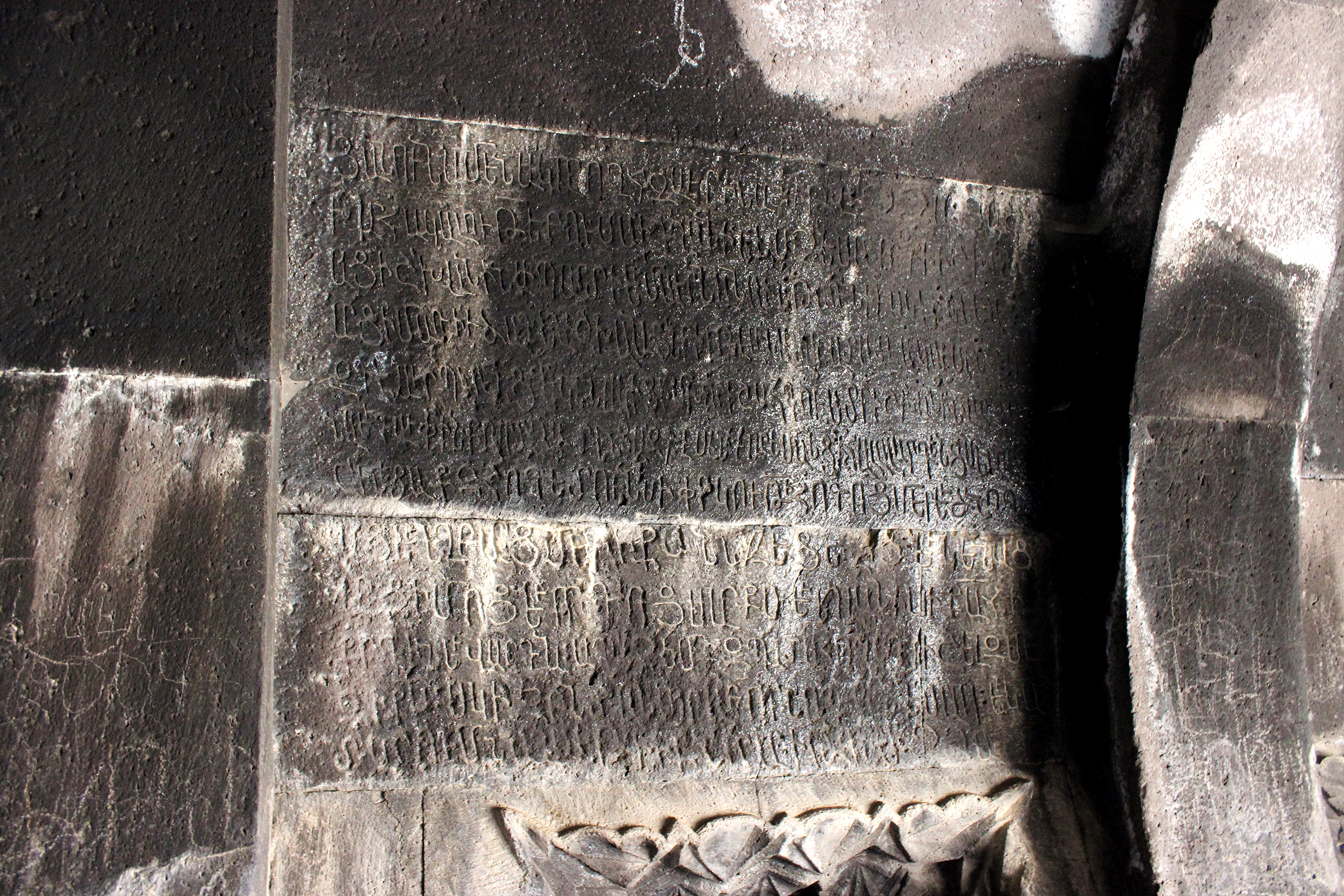
Dedicatory Armenian inscription

In the name of the Almighty and powerful God, in the year 1332, in the world-rule of Busaid Khan, I Chesar son of Prince of Princes Liparit and my mother Ana, grandson of Ivane, and my brothers, handsome as lions, the princes Burtel, Smbat and Elikom of the Orbelian Dynasty, and my wife Khorishah daughter of Vardan [and ...] of the Senikarimans, built this spiritual house with our own funds for the salvation of our souls and those of our parents and brothers reposing in Christ, and of my living brothers and sons Sargis, Hovhannes the priest, Kurd and Vardan. We beseech you, passers-by, remember us in Christ. The beginning of the house [took place] in the high-priesthood of Esai, and the end, thanks to his prayers, in the year 1332.

The caravanserai is constructed of blocks of basalt. It has a single hall divided into three naves, with seven pairs of polyhedral pillars. Animals rested in the narrow aisles to the left and right of the main hall. Between the pillars were stone troughs for the animals, and in the corner of one of the halls was a pool of water. Travelers slept in a separate room built at the end of the narrow aisles on the western side of the caravanserai. The roof above the three-aisled hall had three parallel vaults with an oculus in each. The vaults were supported by arches that stretched from pillar to pillar along the aisles, and traversed from the pillars to the walls. Oculi placed in the middle of each of the vaults served the purpose of letting in sunlight and fresh air, while also letting out smoke. As mentioned earlier, these are the only other areas of the caravanserai that have ornamentation besides the decoration found at the entry vestibule.

The caravanserai was restored during the years 1956–1959. The ruins of a structure east of the vestibule was formerly believed to be a church. This identification was disproved by archaeological excavations in 2014, although evidence on this building's actual purpose was inconclusive.

== Gallery ==
Orbelian's Caravanserai

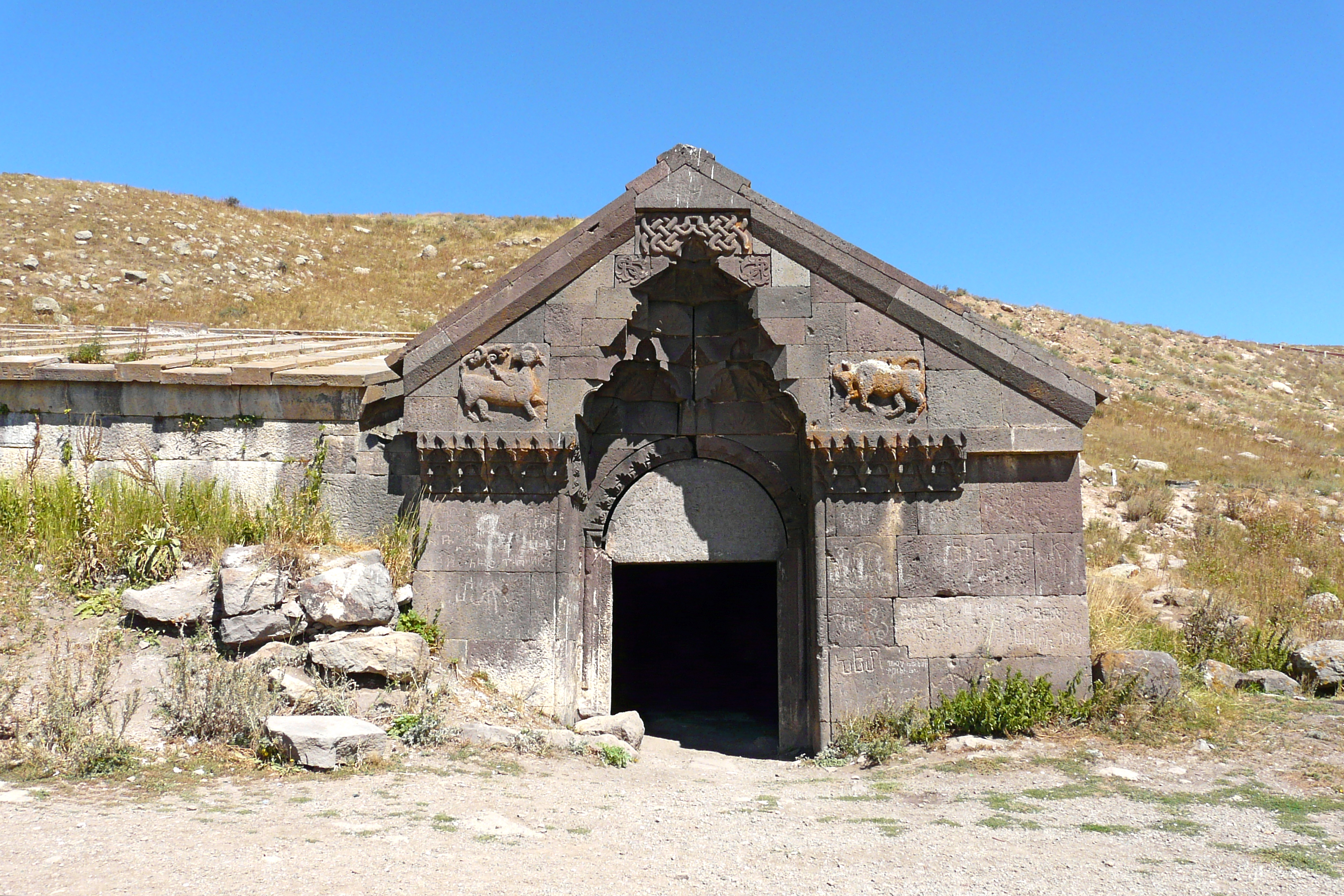
Orbelian's Caravanserai as seen from the front

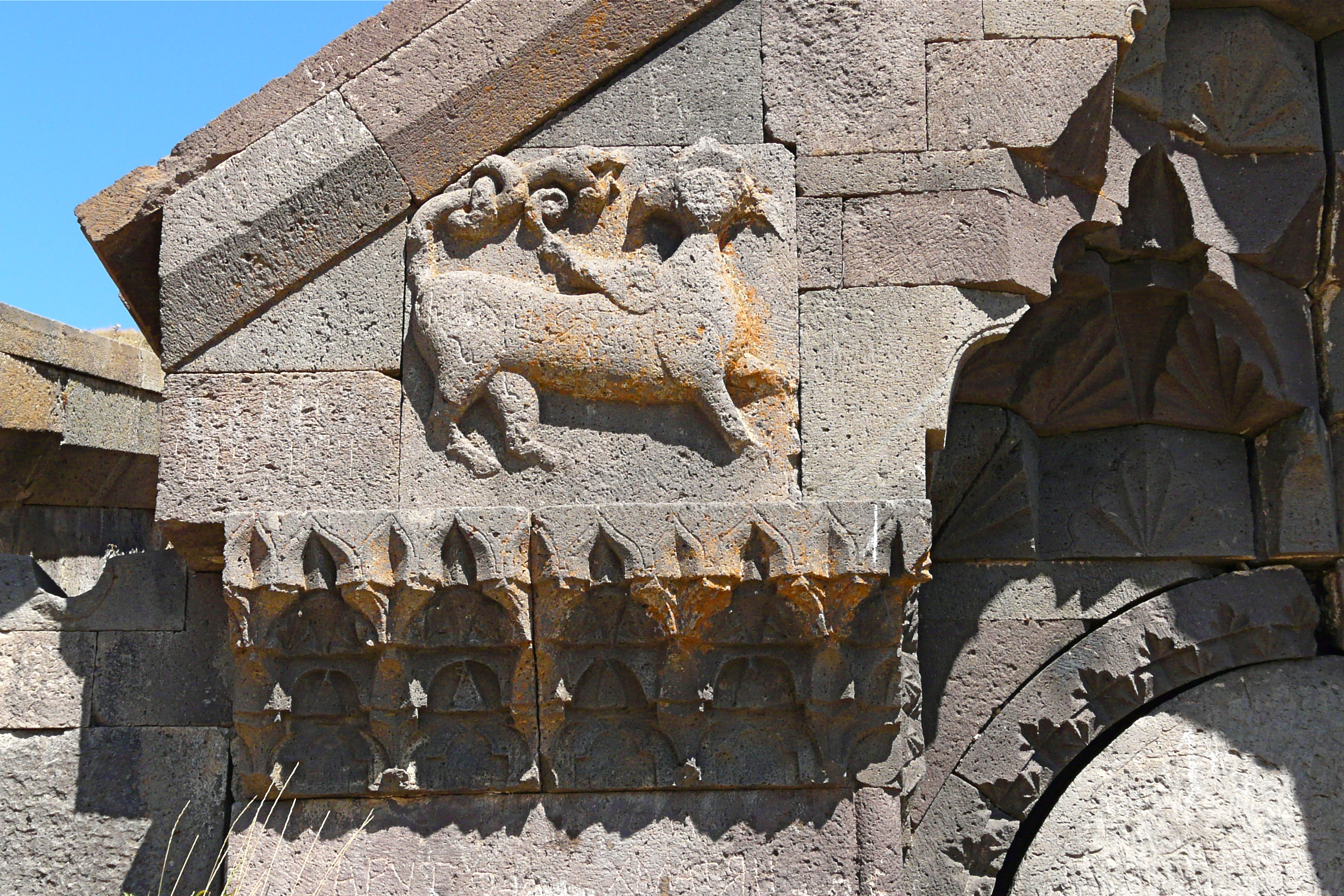
High-relief of a winged animal to the left above the front entry

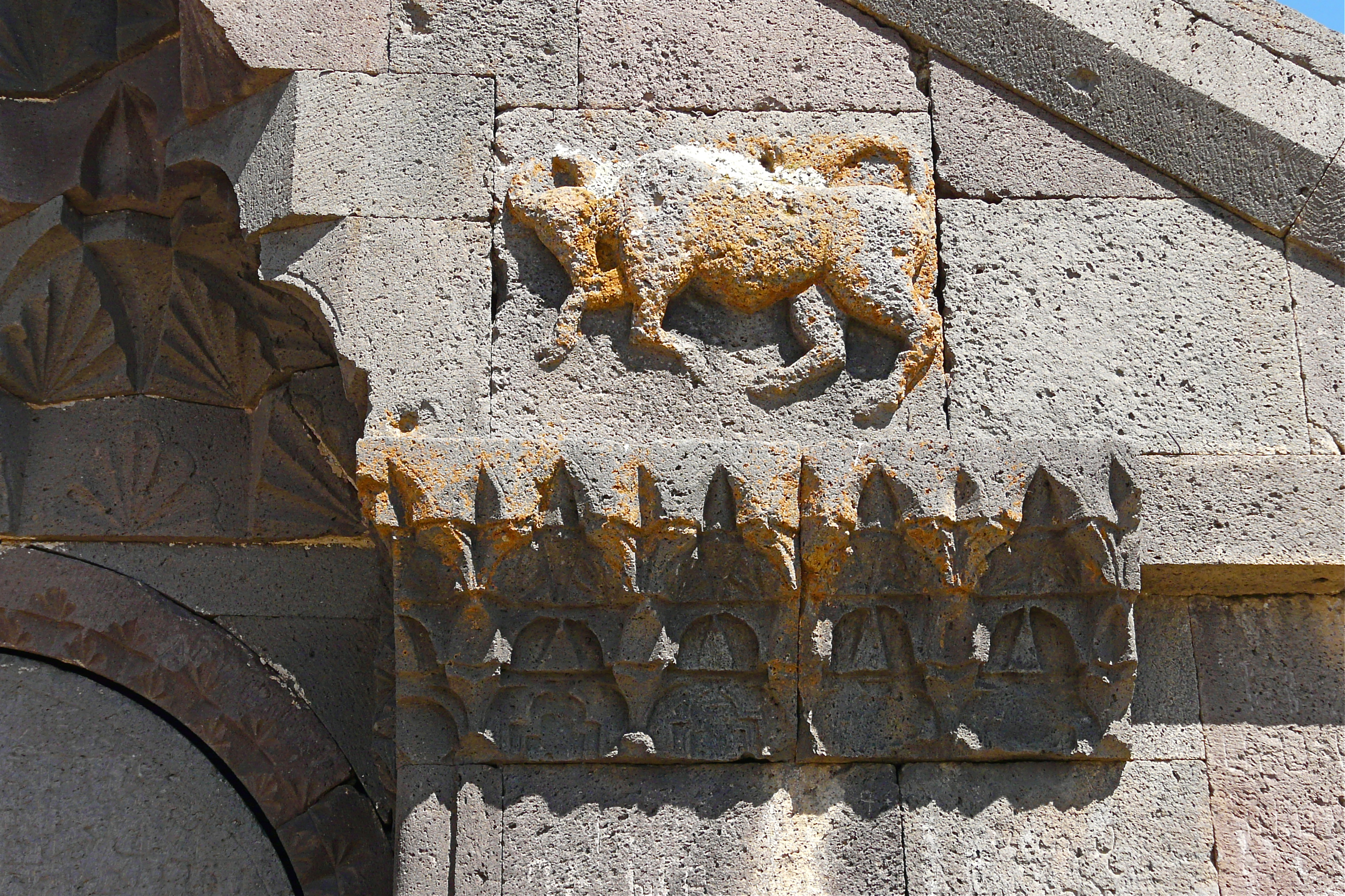
High-relief of a bull to the right above the front entry

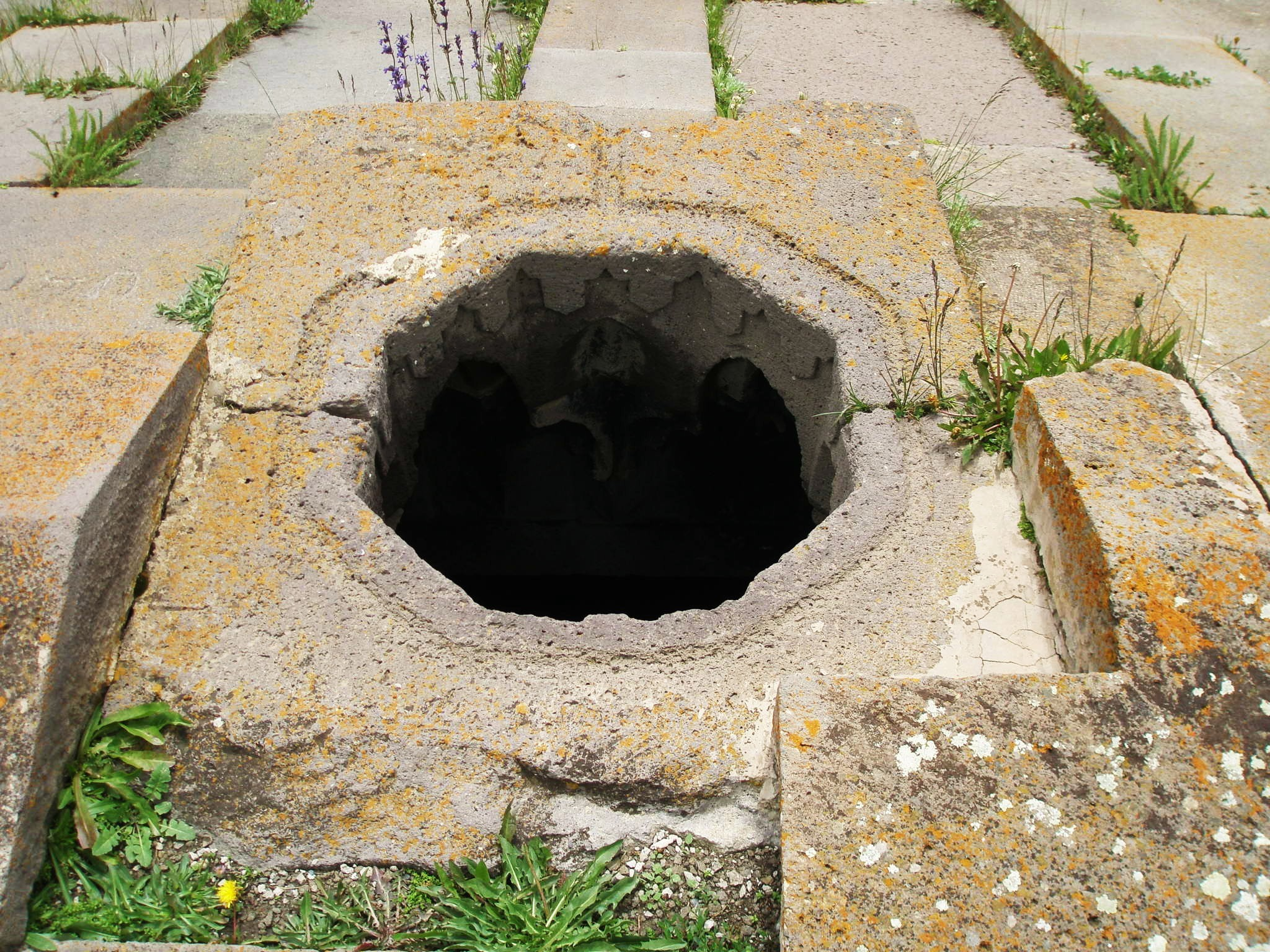
View of an oculus from on top of the roof

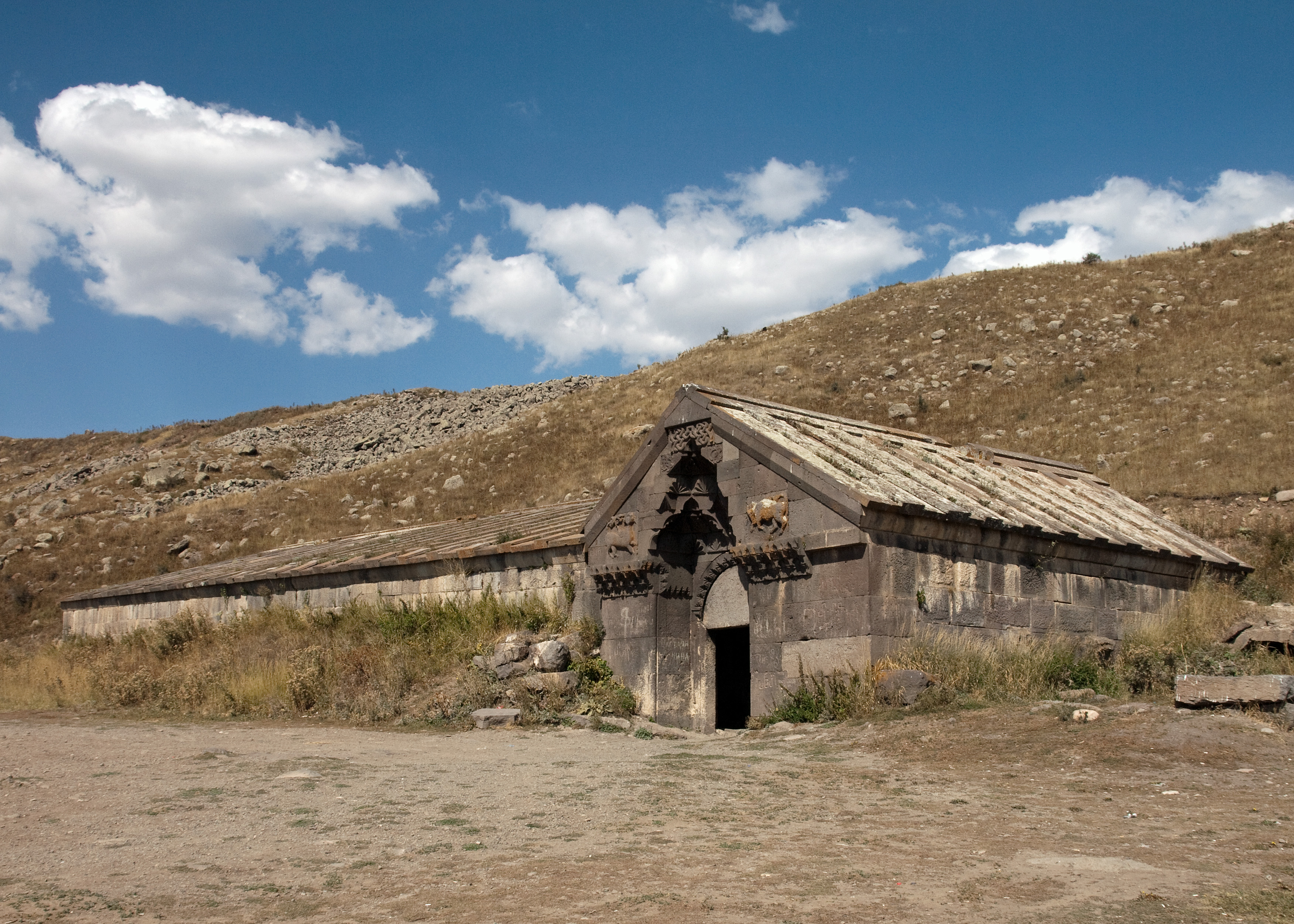
Orbelian's Caravanserai

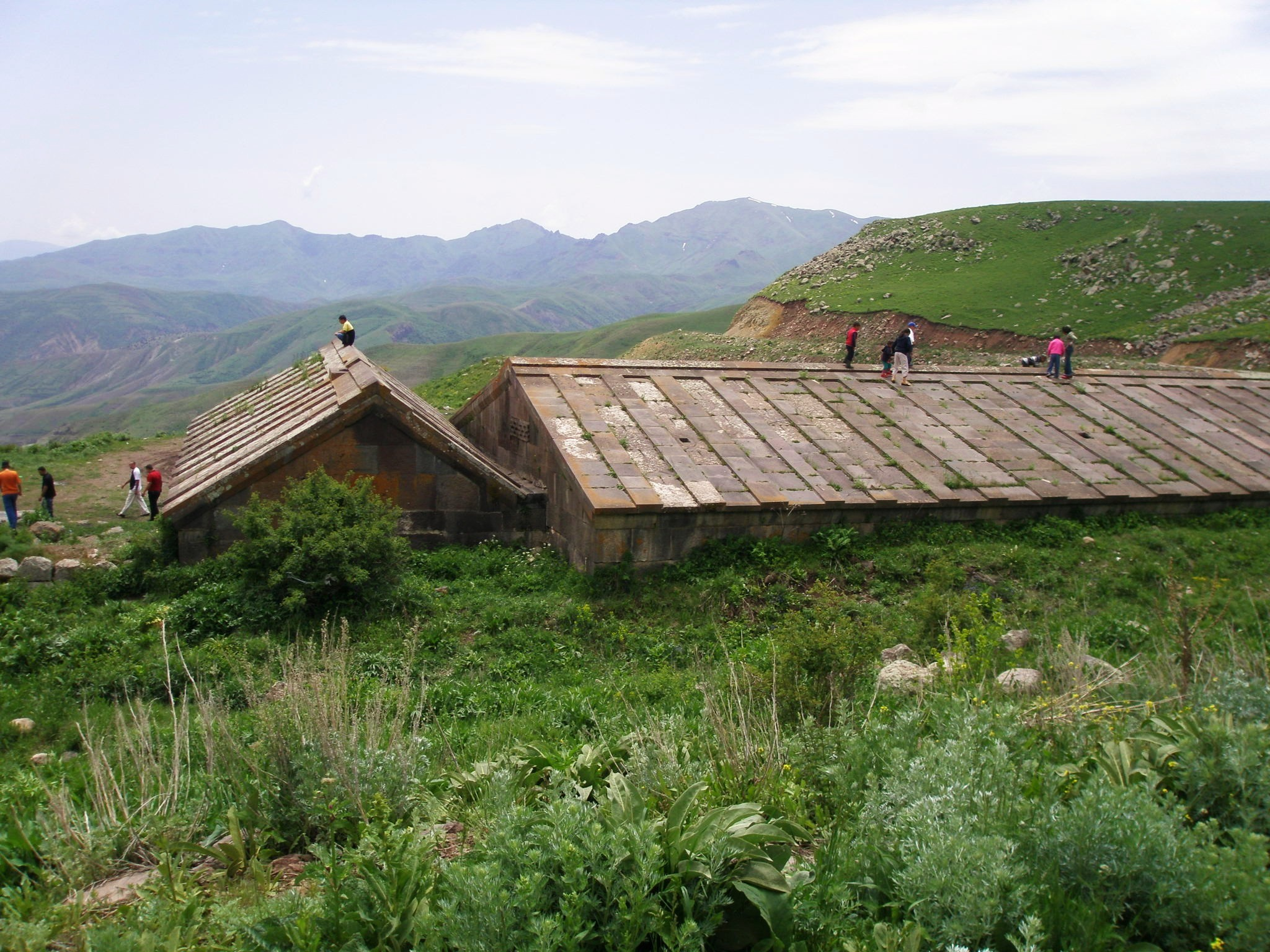
View from the rear

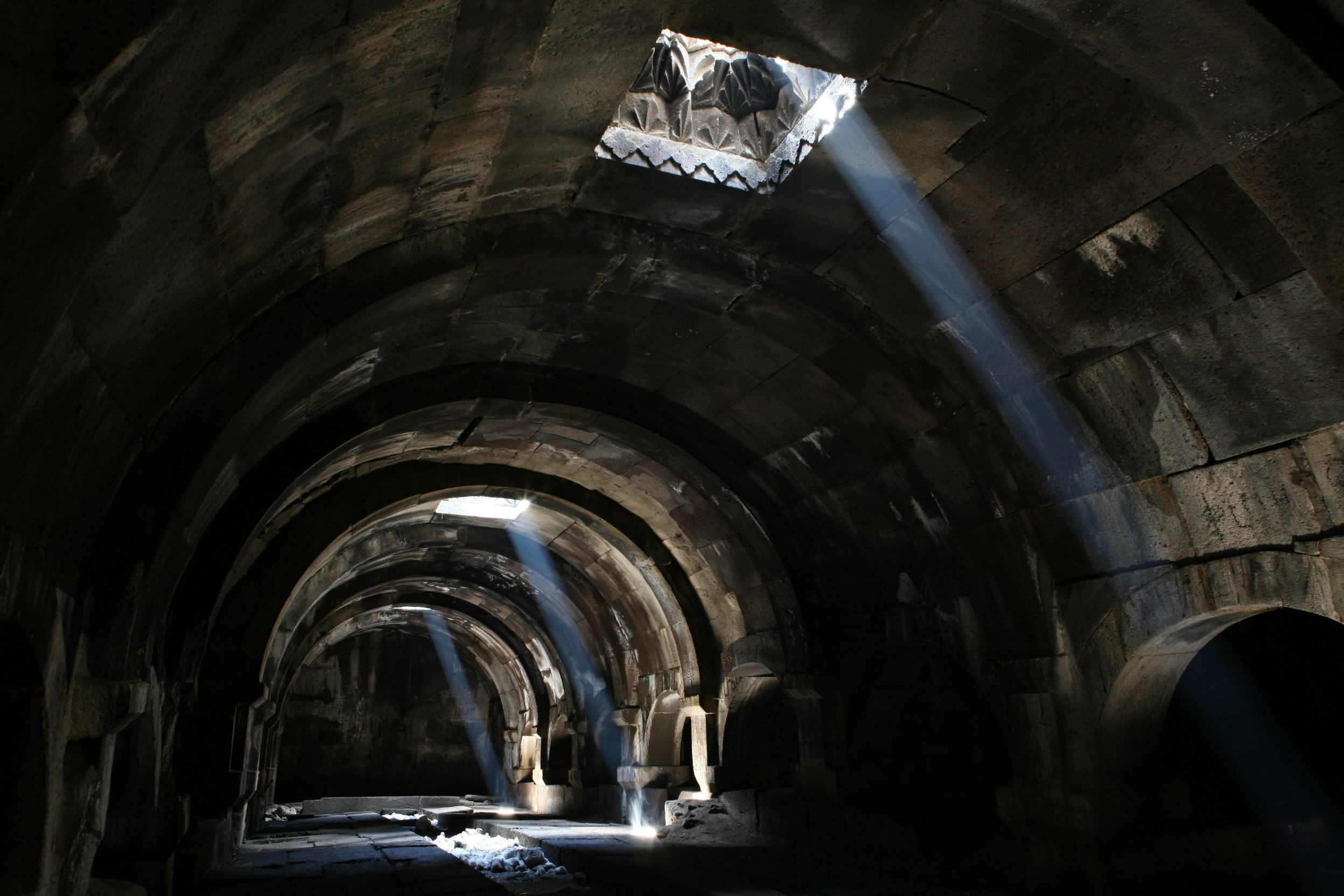
Interior hall

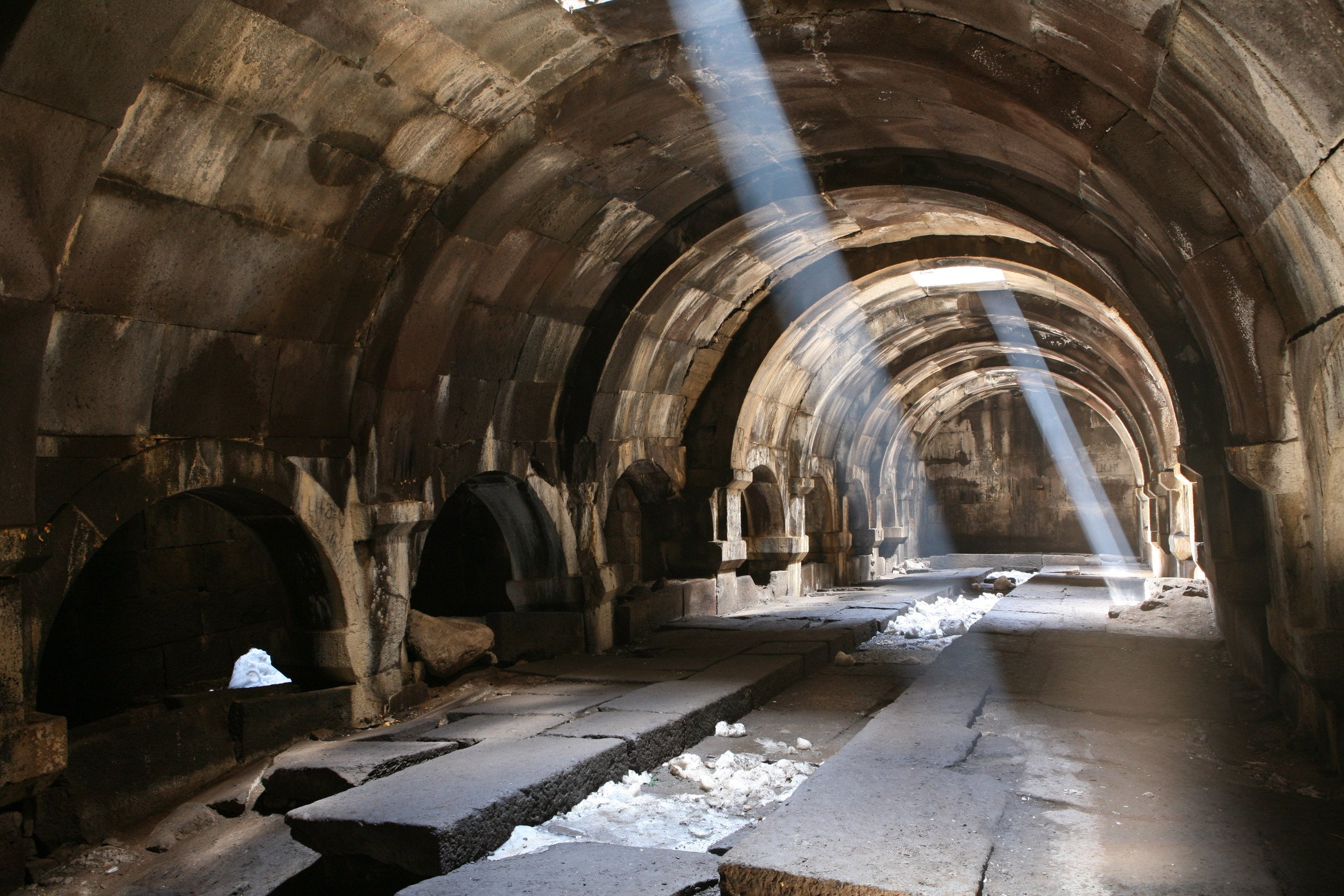
Interior hall

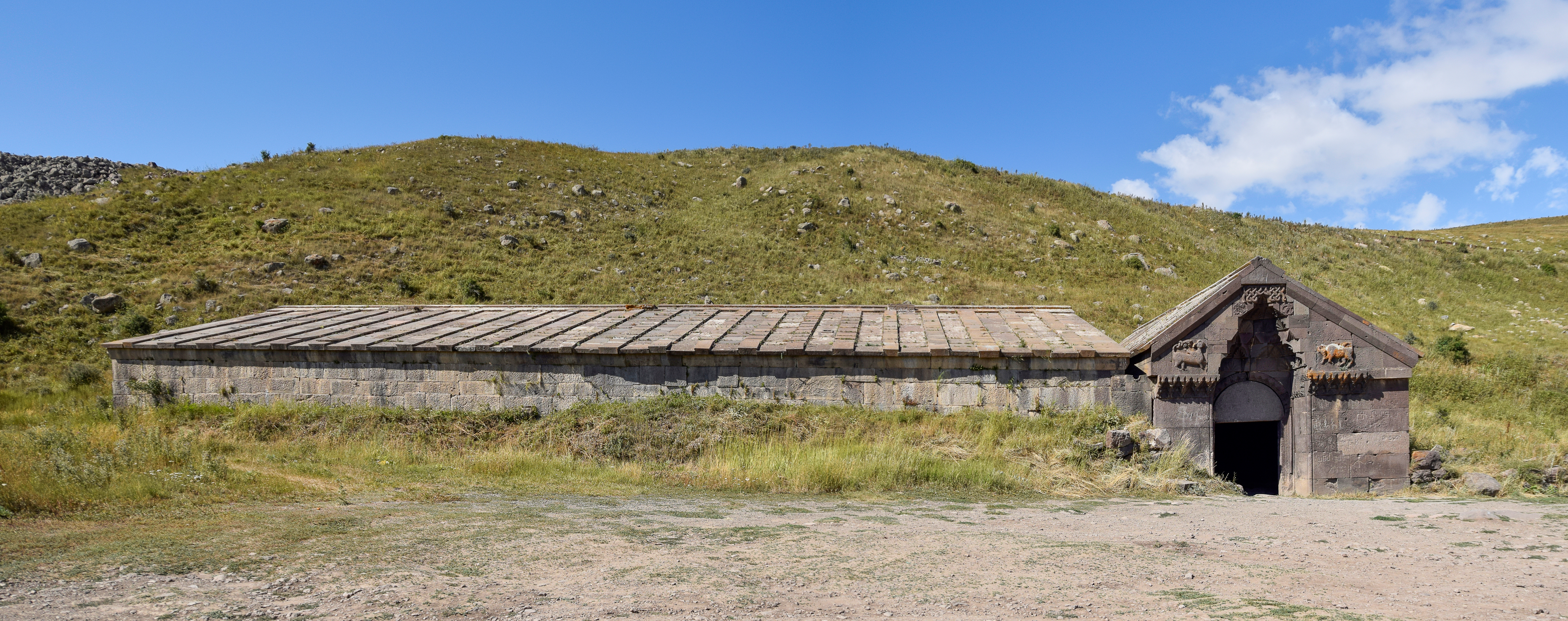
Panoramic view

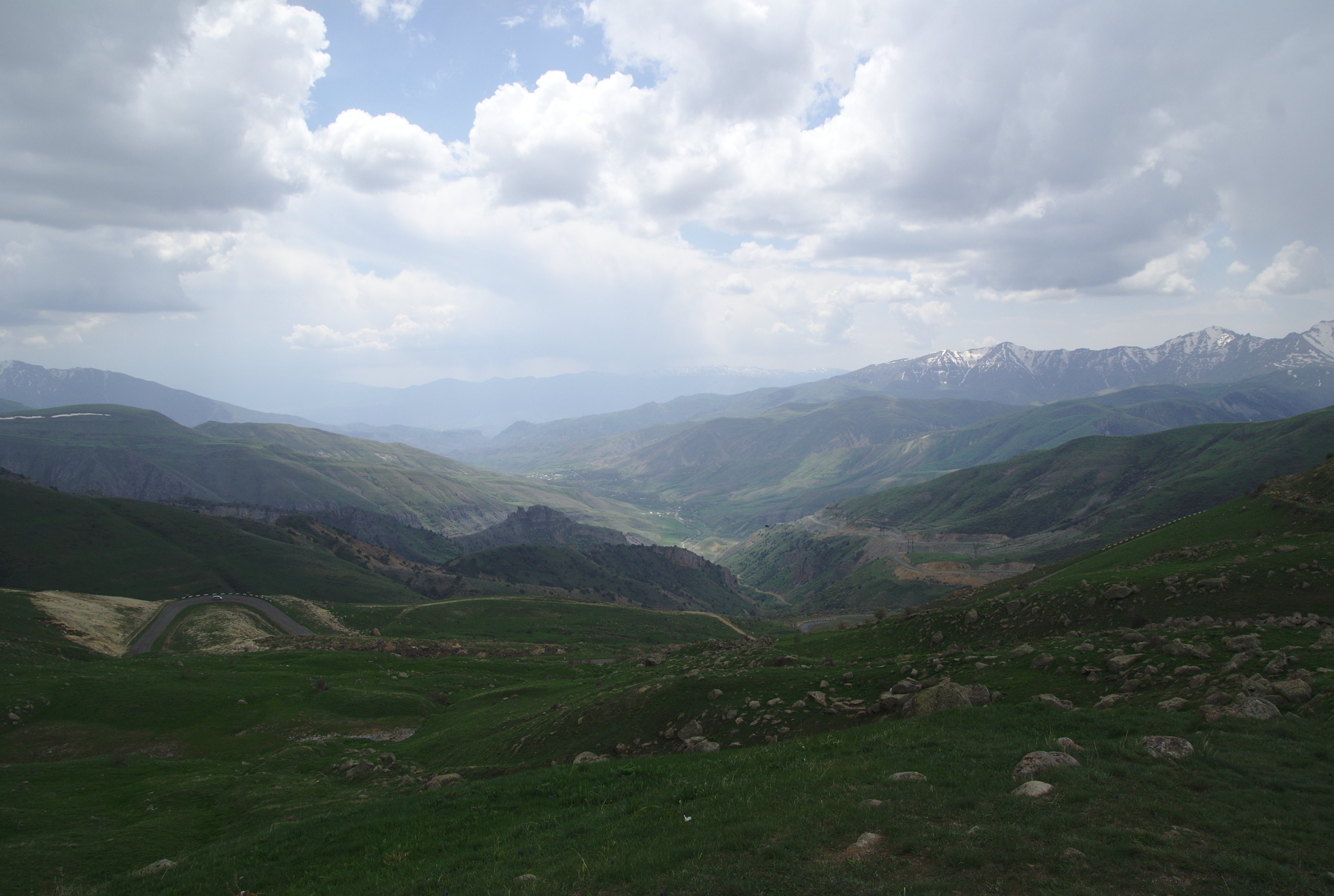
Vardenyats Mountain Pass; also Selim Mountain Pass

== See also ==
List of caravanserais in Armenia
