= Aruch =

Aruch Արուճ
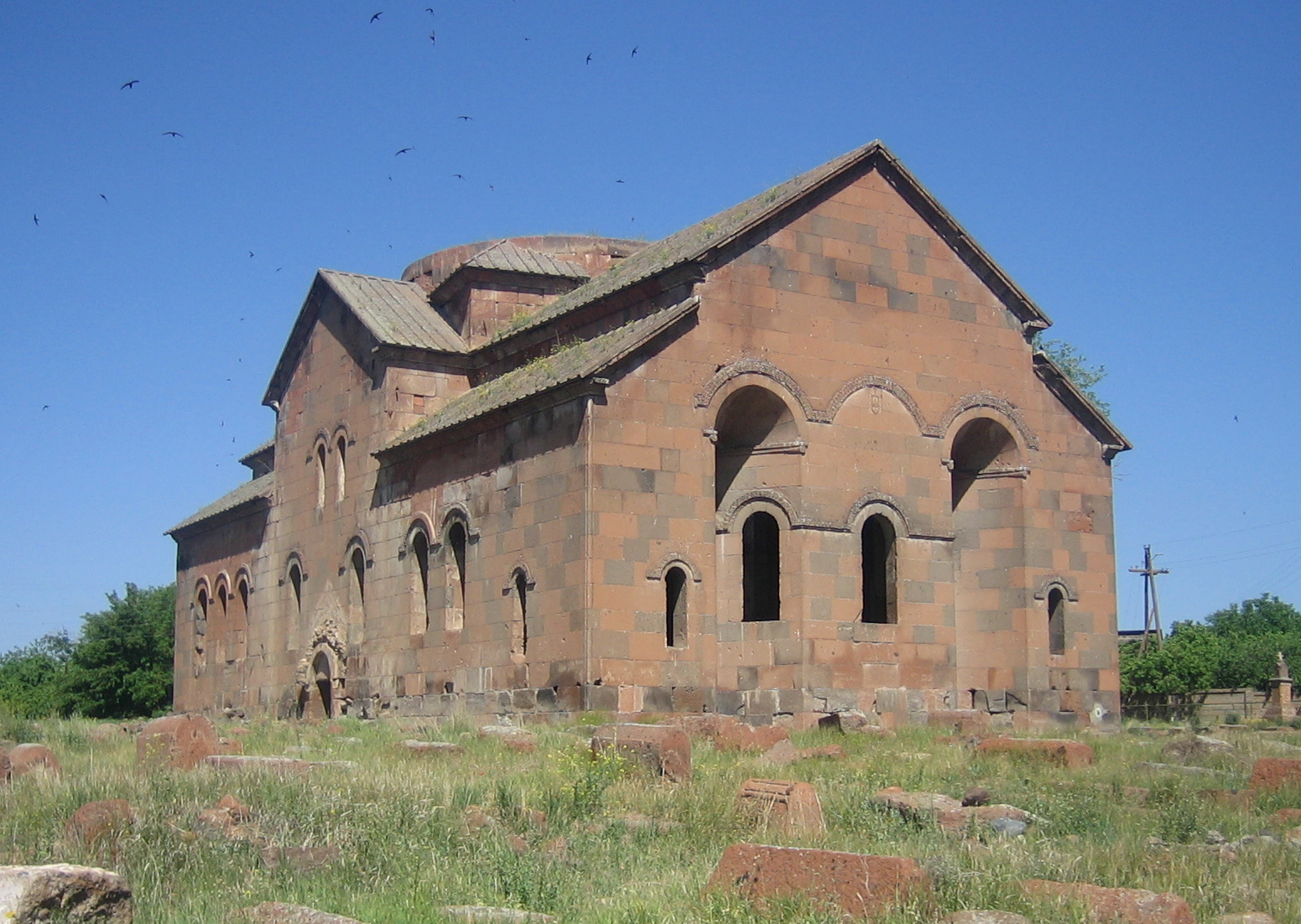
- Aruchavank monastery (7th century)

- Location within Armenia Location within Aragatsotn
- Coordinates: 40°17′33″N 44°04′45″E
- Country: Armenia
- Province: Aragatsotn
- Municipality: Ashtarak

Population (2011)
  - Total: 1,014
- Time zone: UTC+4
  - Summer (DST): UTC+5

Aruch (Armenian: Արուճ) is a village in the Ashtarak Municipality of the Aragatsotn Province of Armenia. It is located on the southern part of Mount Aragats. The settlement dates back to the 6th century when it was the winter camp of the royal army. It was later made to a permanent base by Grigor Mamikonian (661-682). The village is the location of the 7th century Armenian monastic complex Aruchavank, adjacent to it are the remains of the Mamikonians' palace.
