= Sangachal caravanserai =

- Azerbaijani: Sanqaçal karvansarası
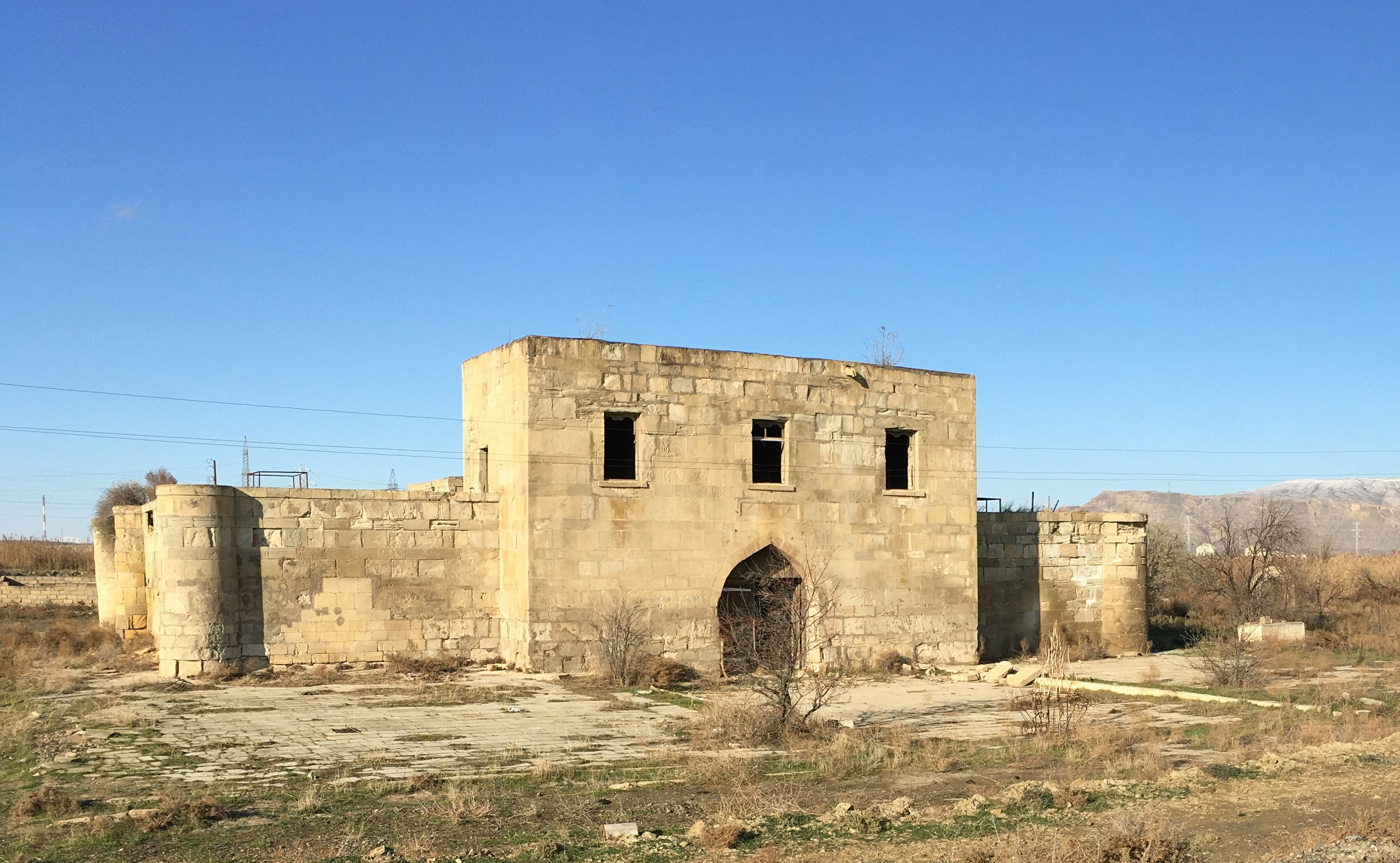
- Interactive map of the Sangachal caravanserai area

General information
- Type: caravanserai
- Location: Sanqaçal, Baku, Azerbaijan
- Coordinates: 40°10′53″N 49°28′38″E
- Construction started: 1439
- Completed: 1440
- Owner: Khalilullah I

The Sangachal caravanserai (Azerbaijani: Sanqaçal karvansarası) is a medieval caravanserai located near the Sangachal village in the Garadagh district of Baku, Azerbaijan, 45 km far from Baku, on the old caravan route Baku - Salyan. Since the 19th century, the indicated caravan route has lost its commercial significance and in this regard, the caravanserai has ceased to be used.

== History ==
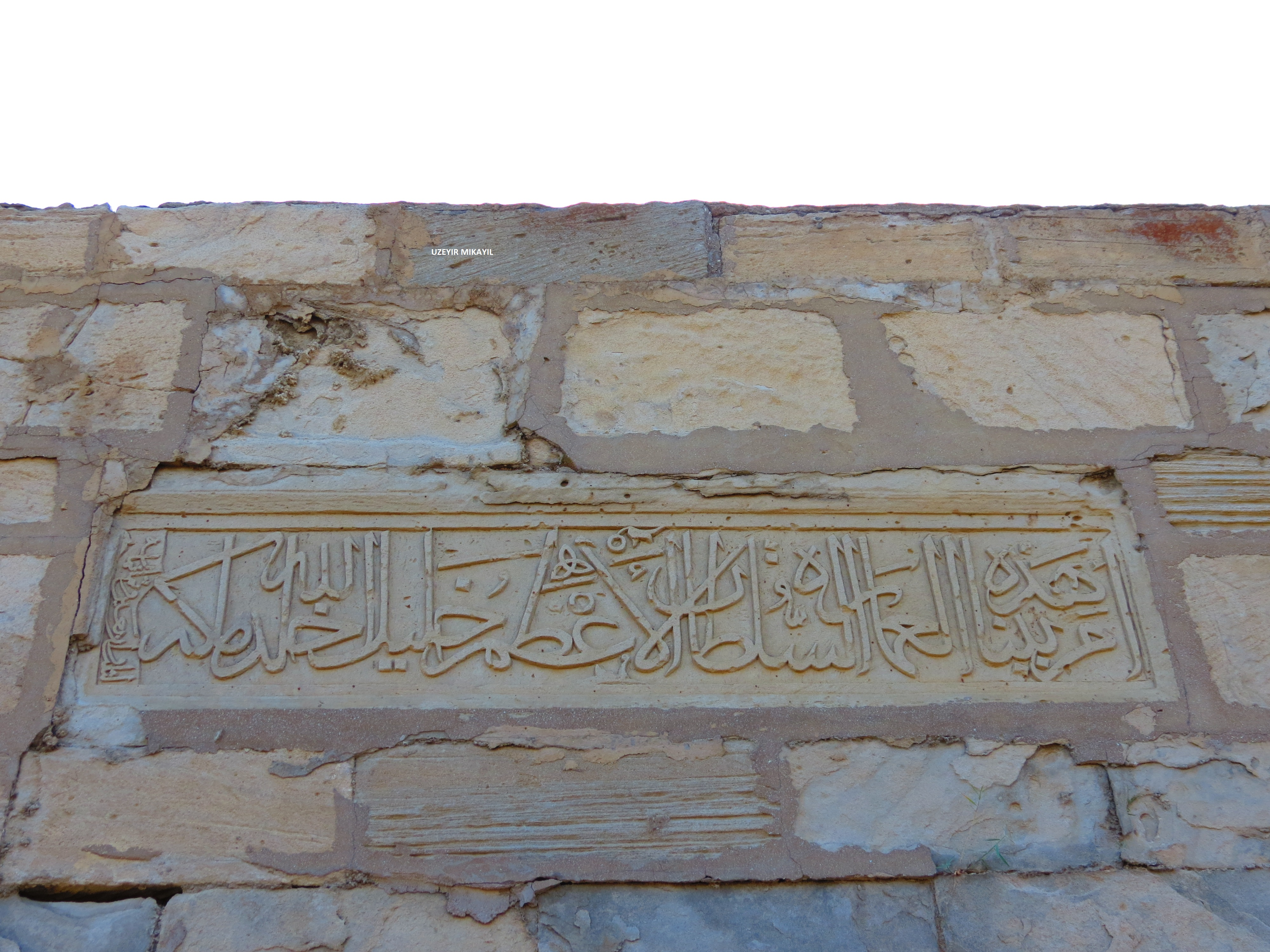
Kitabe (a panel with inscriptions in Arabic graphics, a type of epigraphic ornament) on the facade of the caravanserai

The Sangachal caravanserai is located on the shore of the Caspian Sea bay, and the small river Dzheyrankechmez with fresh waters which flows on its left side. On the right, the caravanserai is protected from the winds by a pile of rocky stones. The Sangachal caravanserai was built on the once busy trade route connecting Baku with Salyan. There were several caravanserais on this route: the 15th century caravanserai of Garachy has survived to nowadays, closer to Sangachal there was the Yengi caravanserai built at the expense of the merchant Khwaja Haji Baba (second half of the 16th century) Within the Shirvanshahs palace fund there is a stone slab with an inscription indicating that between Baku and Sangachal there was a caravanserai, also built by the merchant Khwaja Haji Baba. However, only the Sangachal caravanserai operated the longest (until the 19th century). I. N. Berezin, who visited it in the first half of the 19th century, indicates the Sangachal caravanserai as “the only place with fresh water”.

A kitabe has been preserved on the north-eastern facade of the caravanserai. The Arabic inscription reads:

The great sultan Halilullah ordered to build this building (imaret), may Allah perpetuate his reign (in) the eight hundred and forty-third (year)

— 1439-40 year

I. Lerkh, I. Berezin, B. Dorn pointed out the same in their notes. The architectural historian Sh. Fatullayev-Figarov believes that the architectural features of the caravanserai building allow us to attribute it to the period of the 14-15th centuries. On the mentioned timeline, the above-described territory was part of the Shirvanshahs state. Khalilullah indicated in the inscription is Shirvanshah Khalilullah I, who ruled in 1417–1462. It is interesting that the numerous caravanserais preserved inside and outside the Baku fortress were built precisely during the reign of this Shirvanshah.

== Architectural features ==
The structure of the caravanserai and its architectural features are described in detail by the architectural historians L. Bretanitsky and Sh. Fatullayev. Researchers believe that the Sangachal caravanserai is one of the most typical caravanserais of the 14-15th centuries in terms of planning and architectural appearance. The external appearance of the caravanserai is determined by a regular rectangle of straight walls, built of purely hewn large limestone stone. Their joints and axes are reinforced with small massive semi-cylinders, a kind of remnants of the towers of defensive structures. The presence of semi-circular towers, decorative elements on the outer walls and peculiar windows makes the Sangachal caravanserai look like a defensive structure. In the centre of the main south-eastern facade, a large portal rises significantly above the walls. The volumetric composition is based on contrasting techniques when the emphasized facade of the central part and the developed form of the entrance are opposed by low clumps of walls with angular axial towers along the perimeter.

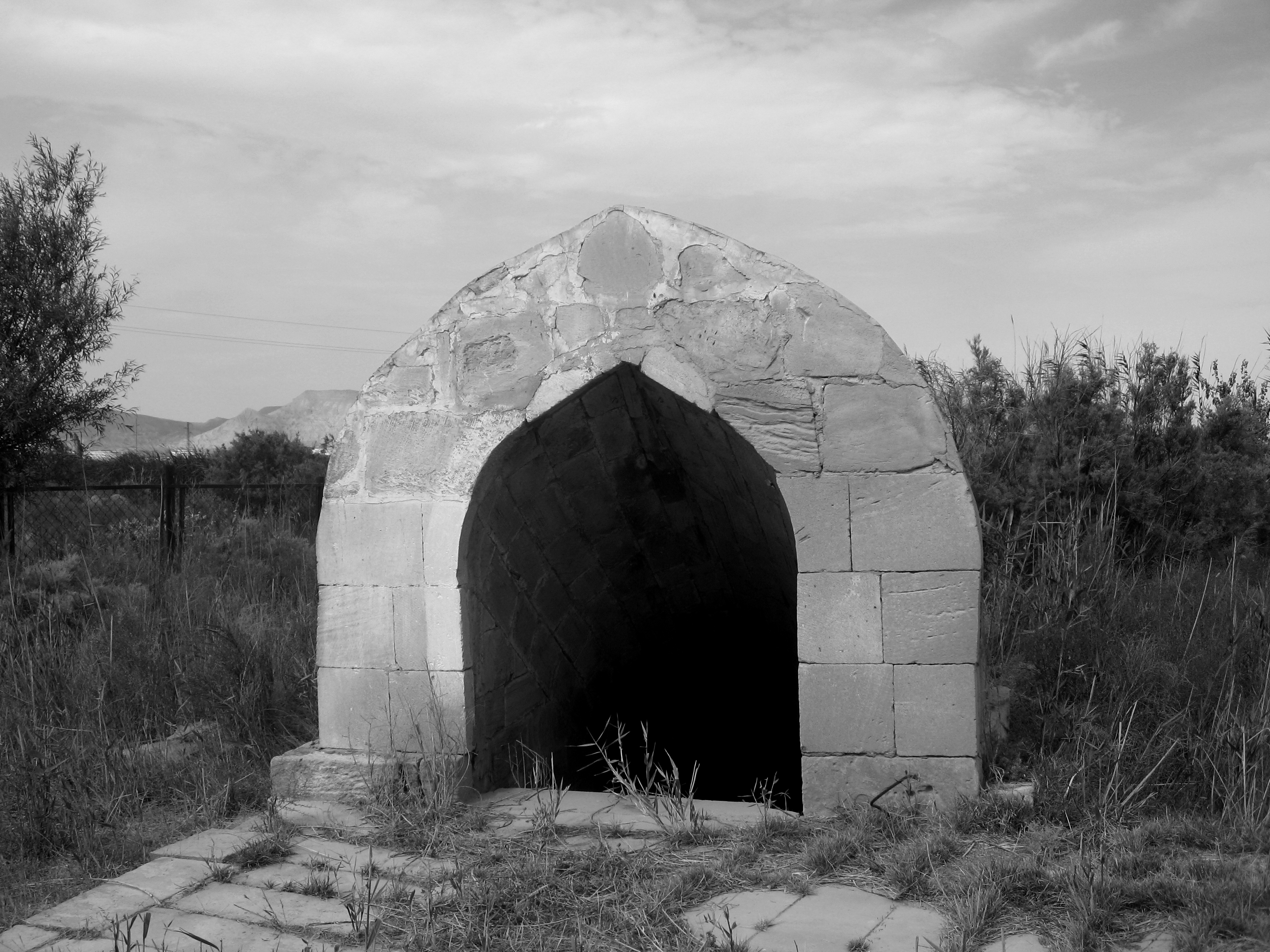

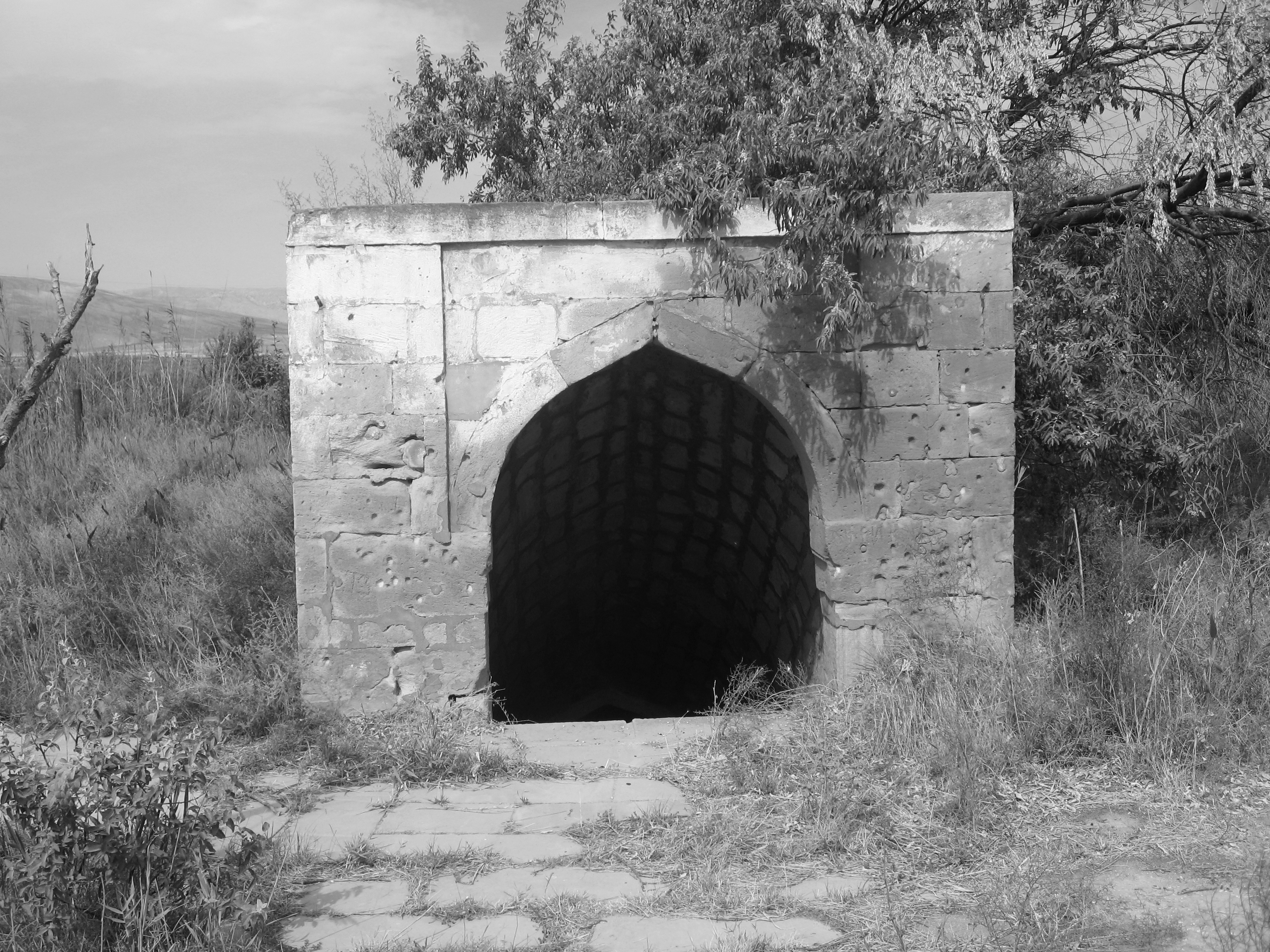
Ovdanlar

The architecture of the facades is devoid of any decor; the entire complex is characterized by an alternation of wide and narrow rows of masonry, a slightly protruding stone cornice and rarely located stone gutters - gargoyles. The caravanserai is rectangular in plan. The Sangachal caravanserai, like the Miadjik (Absheron peninsula, 15th century), has an inner courtyard. The entrance is arranged in a rather original way: between two small rooms in the lower tier of the portal, there is a deep opening covered with a lancet vault, which leads to the courtyard. The internal layout of the caravanserai is strictly symmetrical. The yard is framed with isolated rooms. Some of which were intended for merchants, some were previewed for the pack cattle and the goods. Two L-shaped stone swing staircases lead to a two-storey portal part. At the top of the central volume of the main facade there was a balakhane - three small rooms, to which open stairs that led from the courtyard. Probably, the balakhane rooms were intended for the most noble people of the caravan. The buildings of premises differ: transverse (two-row), longitudinal (single-row). Opposite to the entrance there is an open-type room with a pointed arch. The side wings of the courtyard are of a closed type, with sparsely spaced openings along the perimeter of the stables. The overlap of all rooms was made up of pointed vaults, typical for the stone architecture. The construction work, especially the laying of the pointed vaults, was of a high quality.

The issue of supplying the resting caravan with drinking water was of the same importance as ensuring its safety. Therefore, one of the indispensable conditions for choosing a site for the construction of the caravanserai was the proximity of the source. In addition to the river, located in the immediate vicinity of the caravanserai, the water supply was carried out through two ovdans at the eastern facade of the caravanserai. Underground catchments of a rather large volume, covered with lancet arches and intended for capturing and storing subsoil spring waters, are located at a relatively great depth from the surface of the earth. Gentle stairs, covered with "creeping" cylindrical arches, made of hewn stone slabs, lead to them. Small openings in the castle of the vaults serve to ventilate the sparsely lit dungeons. Small over ground structures with ordinary lancet openings in traditional rectangular frames lead to underground rooms. Small but expressive volumes of ovdans with emphasized pointed arches of portals interacted with the architectural forms of the caravanserai, creating a single volumetric-spatial environment.

According to L. Bretanitsky, “the kinships style of the caravanserais architectural appearance with the monuments of the Shirvan-Absheron circle is beyond doubt. This is proved by the layouts similarity of the architectural masses, the closeness of laconic, but emphasized plastically interpreted architectural forms and the identity of the structures associated with them. Numerous later monuments of similar purpose and appearance testify that this type of structures turned out to be very stable.” According to Sh. Fatullayev, “the caravanserai in Sangachal is a period of formation and development of civil structures at a new stage of understanding the stylistic features of Absheron architecture, which laid the foundation for the construction of many buildings of this type.” The "attachment" of the continental Asias trade infrastructure to servicing long-distance caravan trade led to the destruction of the Silk Road leading to the decline of this infrastructure as well. But, according to researchers, the Sangachal caravanserai was not abandoned: small traces of repair and restoration work and reconstruction indicate that the building functioned for a long time.

== Present condition ==
On the territory of the caravanserai in the ’90s of the 20th century, an attempt was made to organize a cafe and even illegal internal and external alterations were carried out (the stables and cells, as well as the storage rooms were partially converted into a kitchen and cafe rooms, the courtyard was paved with facing plates, plates with the name of the cafe, decorative metal gratings, etc.). Although the relevant state authorities prevented the construction, its consequences still persist.

In 2008, at the international conference Strabos Way as part of the Great Silk Road, held under the auspices of the International Institute for Central Asian Studies of UNESCO, the Doctor of Philosophy in History, the Associate Professor Sabuhi Ahmedov read a report on the topic Museum Azerbaijan on the Great Silk Road in the caravanserai Sangachal. The idea expressed at the conference to organize on the territory of the caravanserai a museum "Azerbaijan on the Great Silk Road" was supported by the organizing committee of the conference.

According to the author, the above museum can be created in the Sangachal caravanserai, since:

1. This is a real historical monument associated with the Great Silk Road. In the monument itself, there is an opportunity to carry out restoration work, to create a thematic exhibition "In one passage from Baku" (by means of mannequins and dummies to recreate the rest of a caravan that arrived from distant countries);
2. Findings of anchors in the bay show that some of the goods brought by land were sent by sea, i.e. there is an opportunity to demonstrate the maritime trade;
3. The rocks rolled by the sea near the caravanserai clearly show the level that the Caspian reached during the Middle Ages;
4. The structure of the caravanserai and ovdans is an example of the classical caravanserai and, at the same time, the construction of the Shirvan-Absheron architectural school allows to demonstrate both the operation of the caravanserai and the level of development of the medieval architecture of Azerbaijan;
5. The surroundings of the caravanserai are not built up, which makes it possible to build a modern museum building, which will house scientific exhibitions and museum funds, as well as service premises.

== Photos ==
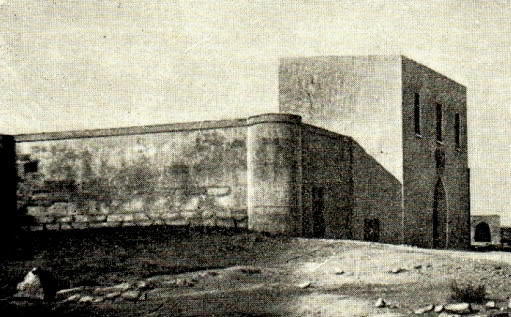
Caravanserai in the beginning of the 20th century

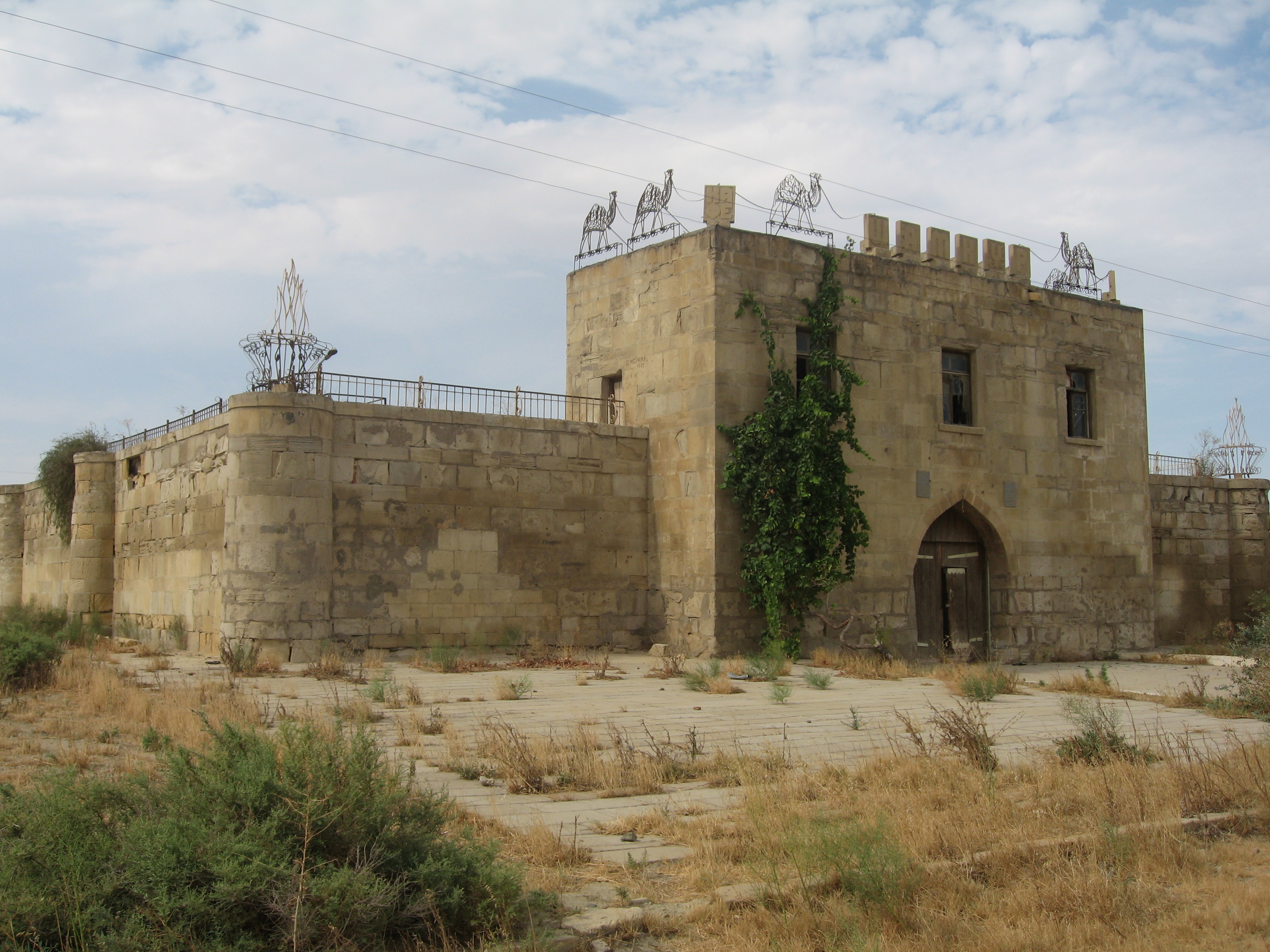
Caravanserai in 2007. After the reconstruction as a café

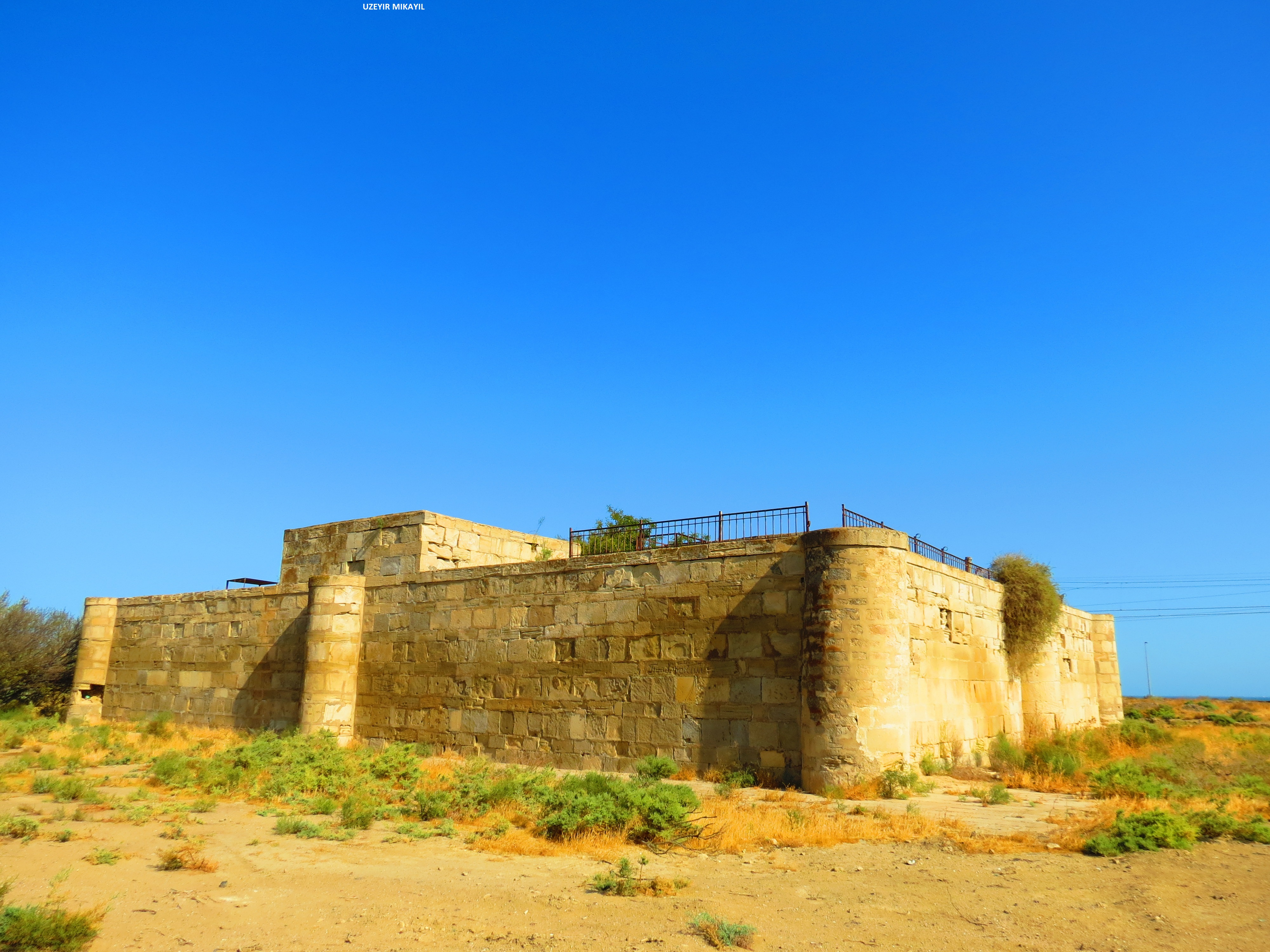
Back side of the caravanserai

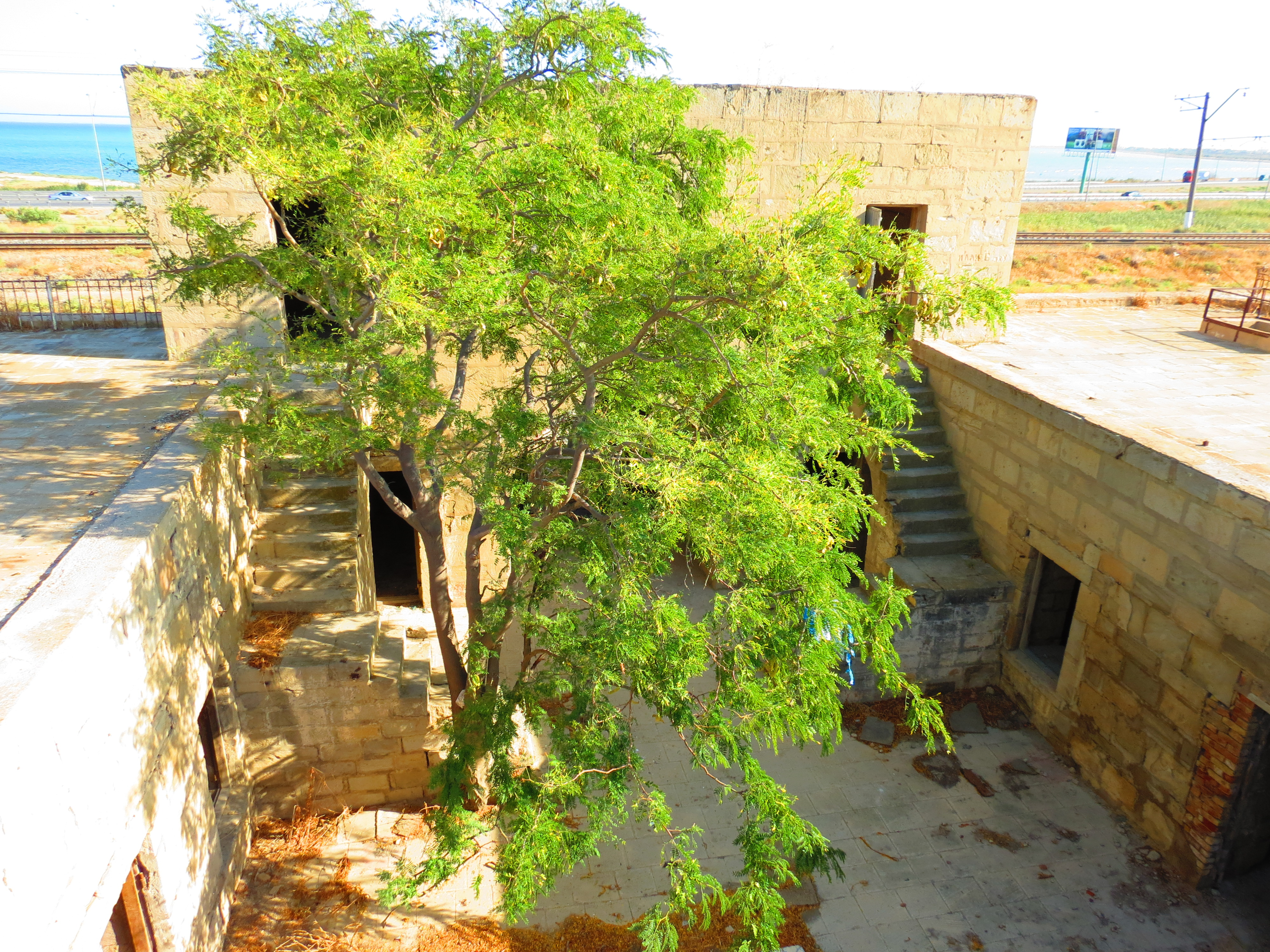
The courtyard of the caravanserai

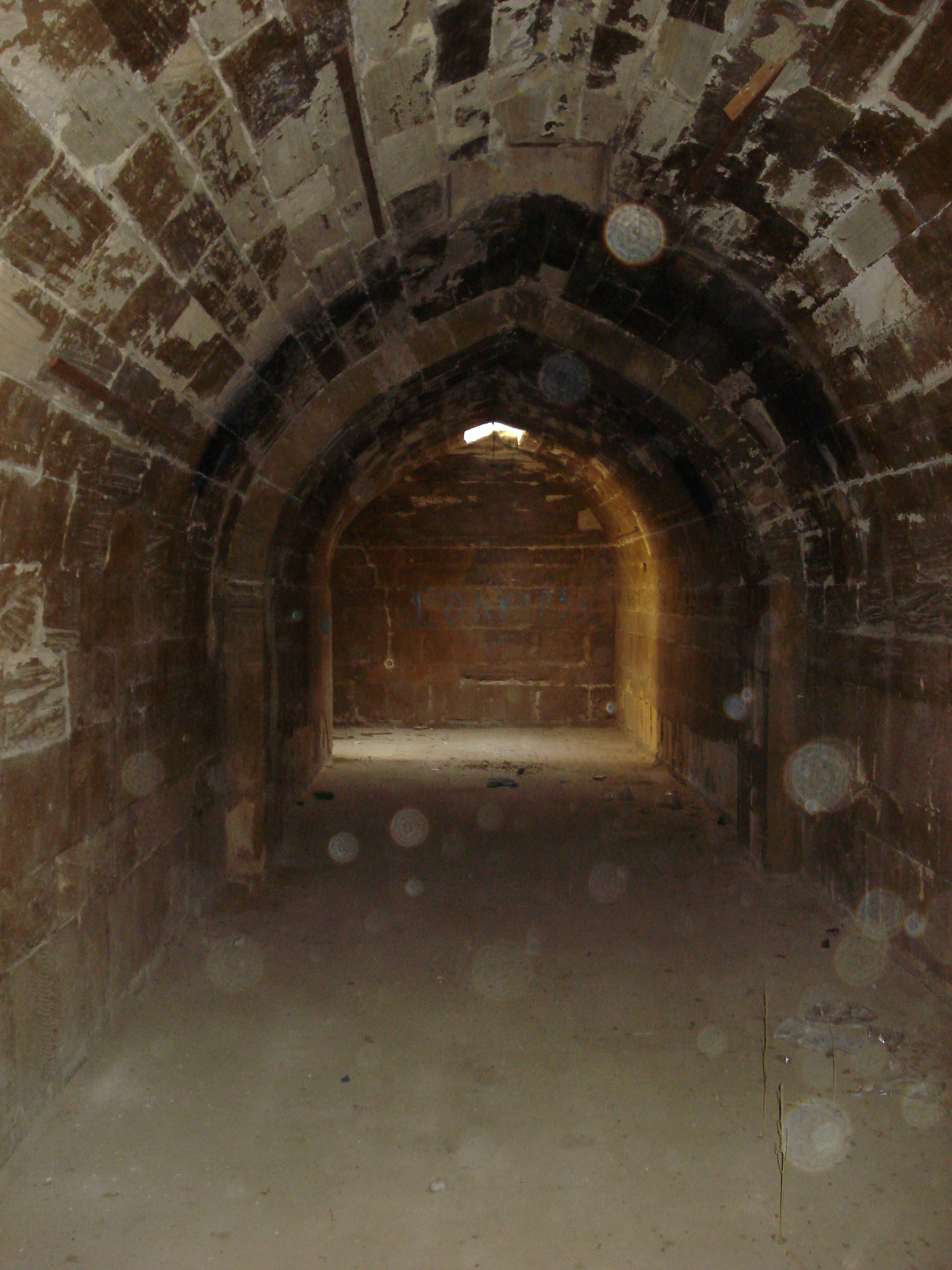
Warehouses of the Sangachal caravanserai

== See also ==
- Bukhara Caravanserai
- Multani Caravanserai
- Small Caravanserai
