= Sangachal =

Sangachal may refer to:

- Sanqaçal, settlement and municipality in Baku
- Sangachal Terminal, industrial complex in Baku
