= Embassy of Azerbaijan, Islamabad =

Embassy of Azerbaijan, Islamabad Azərbaycanın Pakistan səfirliyi (Azerbaijani)
- Location: Islamabad, Pakistan
- Address: Plot 1D and 1E, Diplomatic Encave II
- Coordinates: 33.7208°N 73.0928°E
- Ambassador: Ali Alizada
- Website: islamabad.mfa.gov.az

The Embassy of Azerbaijan in Islamabad is the diplomatic mission of Azerbaijan to Pakistan. It is located at Plot 1D and 1E in Diplomatic Encave II, Islamabad. The embassy is concurrently accredited to Afghanistan.

Azerbaijan and Pakistan established diplomatic relations in June 1992, soon after the former gained independence. The Azerbaijani embassy in Islamabad was established on 24 August 1997.

The current Azerbaijani ambassador to Pakistan is Ali Alizada, appointed in July 2016. Various diplomatic staff are posted at the mission, along with a defense attaché.

== See also ==
- Azerbaijan–Pakistan relations
