= Azerbaijan–Pakistan relations =

- Pakistan: Azerbaijan

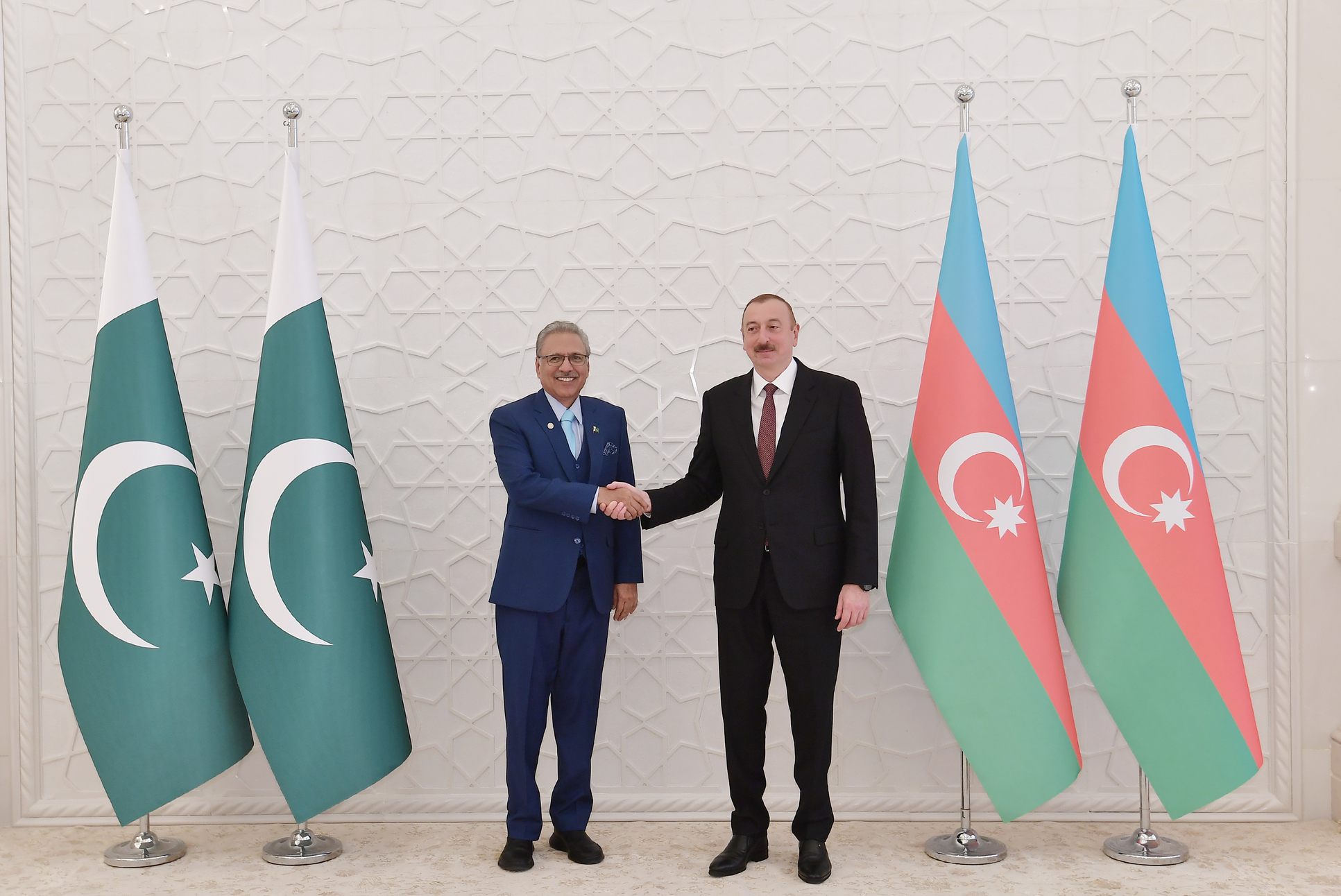
Azerbaijani president Ilham Aliyev meeting his Pakistani counterpart Arif Alvi in Islamabad

Azerbaijan–Pakistan relations refer to bilateral relations between the Republic of Azerbaijan and the Islamic Republic of Pakistan. Pakistan has an embassy in Baku and Azerbaijan has an embassy in Islamabad. Both countries are enhancing contact between their respective capitals. The two nations are considered "strategic partners".

Modern relations between the two states were established when the Republic of Azerbaijan became independent following the collapse of the USSR – on June 9, 1992. Pakistan was the second country to recognize Azerbaijan – on December 12, 1991, after Turkey. Trade and cooperation have steadily grown between the two nations, with several summits being held on how to improve trade between the two nations.

Azerbaijan and Pakistan "enjoy strategic partnership relations", according to officials of both countries said in March 2013.

== History ==
At the beginning of the 20th century, more than 100,000 people died of a disease in Pakistan (at that time British India). Azerbaijani millionaire and philanthropist Haji Zeynalabdin Tagiyev bought and sent more than 300,000 ampoules of plague inoculation to Pakistan at his own expense. It was this factor that played a major role in the victory over the plague in Pakistan. For 20 years this story was passed from mouth to mouth in Pakistan. It was only in 1947, after Pakistan gained independence, that this fact was included in the textbook. Since then, the Pakistani people have recognised Azerbaijan as a brotherly state.

== Official meetings ==
Farooq Leghari became the first president of Pakistan to visit Azerbaijan in 1995. A year later, Heydar Aliyev visited Islamabad. There were several meetings between Heydar Aliyev and the prime minister of Pakistan – Benazir Bhutto which ended with the signing of 9 agreements (including agreements on friendship and cooperation, trade, tax, health, tourism), which were diplomatically important.

Heydar Aliyev said about Pakistan:

Pakistan and Azerbaijan have very good relations and friendly relations. These relations are established on our past historical traditions. It is no coincidence that Pakistan is one of the first states to recognize the independence of our country after Azerbaijan declared its independence. In the following period, especially in recent years, very good relations have been established between Pakistan and Azerbaijan.

The agreement on defense and military cooperation between countries was concluded in 2002. In the same year, another meeting between President Heydar Aliyev and Pervez Musharraf took place in Istanbul at the summit of the Economic Cooperation Organization.

In September 2003, Azerbaijani Prime Minister Ilham Aliyev met with the President of the Islamic Republic of Pakistan, Pervez Musharraf. Both of them discussed international issues.

In the summer of 2004, Pervez Musharraf made an official visit to Azerbaijan. In July 2003, Pakistani President Pervez Musharraf visited the Heydar Aliyev Foundation in Baku.

In the spring of 2005, President Ilham Aliyev visited Pakistan. During the two-day visit, the heads discussed the potential for establishing a partnership. Six agreements were signed in the field of information and communication, transport, aviation, cultural relations, finance, and education.

In May 2006, the 9th ECO Summit was held in Baku, where the Prime Minister of Pakistan, Shaukat Aziz, took part too.

In the summer of 2008, a delegation led by the Chairman of the Parliament of the Islamic Republic of Pakistan, Muhammad Mian Soomro, and the delegation of the Standing Committee on Foreign Relations of the Senate of Pakistan under the chairmanship of Mushakhid Hussein Saidi visited Baku.

On July 27, 2021, the first trilateral meeting of the Chairman of the National Assembly (Milli Majlis) of Azerbaijan, Sahiba Gafarova, the Chairman of the Grand National Assembly of Turkey, Mustafa Shentop, and the Chairman of the National Assembly of Pakistan, Asad Qaiser, took place.

During the meeting, the text of Baku Declaration was discussed and approved. The Declaration emphasizes the importance of historical and cultural ties, strengthening parliamentary dialogue and cooperation, establishment of peace, stability and development in these regions and et cetera.

It was also decided to hold the second trilateral meeting of the chairmen in Islamabad, Pakistan in 2022.

In July 2024, Azerbaijani President Ilham Aliyev paid a Two day visit to Pakistan. During the visit, President Aliyev held meetings with Prime minister Shehbaz Sharif and President Asif Ali Zardari. The two sides engage in wide-ranging discussions on areas of mutual interest to further strengthen bilateral cooperation. Several agreements were signed during the visit.

In February 2025, Prime Minister Shehbaz Sharif visited Azerbaijan for a two-day trip to strengthen bilateral ties. During the visit, Azerbaijan pledged a $2 billion investment in infrastructure, energy, and mining, with formal agreements expected in April 2025. An amendment to the LNG framework agreement was signed, allowing Pakistan to procure LNG cargoes on demand. Additionally, SOCAR, PSO, and FWO agreed to collaborate on the Machike-Thallian-Tarujabba White Oil Pipeline Project to enhance oil transportation. In the defense sector, both nations reaffirmed equipment collaborations and explored joint manufacturing. An MoU between Nakhchivan and Lahore was also signed to boost cooperation in culture, tourism, and education, further strengthening ties between the two countries.

== Economic relations ==
In autumn 1995, the two countries signed an agreement on cooperation in the field of trade and economy and a protocol on the establishment of a joint commission at the state level. The meetings of the commission mentioned above are held every 2 years in the capital cities of both countries.

In 2005, a branch of the National Bank of Pakistan was opened in Baku.

The 13th ECO Summit took place on March 1, 2017, in Islamabad. The President of the Republic of Azerbaijan Ilham Aliyev also attended the Summit. At the meeting, the Prime Minister of the Islamic Republic of Pakistan – Mohammad Nawaz Sharif and the President of Azerbaijan – Ilham Aliyev came to a mutual agreement to import products of the military-industrial complex of Pakistan into Azerbaijan. Issues related to the defense industry and economy were also discussed.

In November 2017, the Pakistani Chamber of Commerce and Industry in the city of Karachi announced the desire of entrepreneurs to make a contribution into a free economic zone (FEZ) in the Azerbaijani village of Alyat. The main attention will be paid to the development of the pharmaceutical field.

Since late 2017, the IRP has been negotiating with Azerbaijan noting the importance of the "North-South" transport corridor for future. This corridor can become a link in the railway transport of Azerbaijan, Iran and the Russian Federation.

The average bilateral trade turnover between Azerbaijan and Pakistan was US$7.3 million during the second half of 2018. However, both states have the intention to increase this number further in the next five years based on recently signed agreements. Due to Azerbaijan's huge energy capacity (oil and gas) Pakistani side as an oil importing country considers Azerbaijan as an important trade partner. For achieving a further increase in trade, a special working group has been established between the Ministry of Economy of Azerbaijan and the Ministry of Trade of Pakistan on the development of bilateral investment cooperation. It is estimated that over the last decade, the Pakistani side has invested around US$4.2 million in the economy of Azerbaijan. Additionally, in the future, Pakistan could get upper hand in Azerbaijani domestic market by exporting sports goods, leather industry, pharmaceutical, energy, production of lightweight agriculture equipment. According to statistics, trade turnover from January to June 2018 amounted to US$5.82 million. Furthermore, there are approximately more than 250 companies realizing transactions worth $4.2 million between Azerbaijan and Pakistan. In 2018, the total trade turnover between the mentioned countries was calculated 36 percent more than last year's statistics.

According to the bilateral agreement between energy ministries of both Pakistan and Azerbaijan (dated February 2017), Azerbaijan will export the number of oil and gas products, including furnace oil, petrol, diesel, and liquefied natural gas (LNG) to Pakistan.

During 2017, the total transactions between these two countries were estimated to be worth $7.34 million (which was 26.55 percent more compared to the same period of 2016). $5.7 million out of the total number was accounted for imports of Pakistani products by Azerbaijan according to the State Customs Committee of Azerbaijan.

The statistics of the State Customs Committee of Azerbaijan indicate that the trade turnover between Azerbaijan and Pakistan amounted to $8.34 million between January and September 2018. Compared to the same period of 2017, there was an overall 22.46 percent increase. In those transactions, the Pakistani side seemed to have a current account surplus while Azerbaijan had a deficit in that manner.

The Pakistani government has also an agreement with Azerbaijan (on June 20, 2016) which aims to import electricity, crude and refined oil products, liquefied petroleum gas (LPG), and liquefied natural gas (LNG) from Azerbaijan.

== Military cooperation ==
Pakistan is one country with declared nuclear weapons and a state with high degree of development of the military industry. Regarding the issues of military cooperation between Azerbaijan and Pakistan, it is noted that it is possible to produce weapons for common purposes, as well as laying the foundations of military enterprises. On the other hand, Pakistan aims to strengthen its relations with Azerbaijan in the field of energy in view of its deficiency and requirement of energy resources.

Azerbaijan has approached Pakistan with wishes to further expand cooperation in fields of joint production of defence products during the meeting of Pakistan's Minister of Defence Productions with Azerbaijan's president.

In the winter of 2014, during the fifth meeting of the working group on military cooperation between Azerbaijan and Pakistan in the city of Islamabad, the countries signed an agreement on mutual military cooperation.

Over the past decade, Pakistani military experts trained about a hundred Azerbaijani military units.

Azerbaijan is holding talks with Pakistan to purchase JF-17 Thunder multirole fighter aircraft. In October 2016 President Aliyev and PM Nawaz Sharif confirmed plans to carry out joint military exercises. In 2019–2020, the mass production of JF-17 Block 3 fighters is scheduled. Azerbaijan is interested in purchasing Super Mushak trainer aircraft.

On 12 September 2021, Azerbaijan hosted joint military drills with Pakistan and Turkey.

== Armenian genocide ==
Azerbaijan and Pakistan are among the countries a that also includes their alles, Turkey that rejected the Armenian genocide. In April 2021, U.S. President Joe Biden's statements regarding the recognition of the Armenian genocide were condemned by Azerbaijan and Pakistan, with both countries declaring their full solidarity with their ally Turkey.

== International support ==
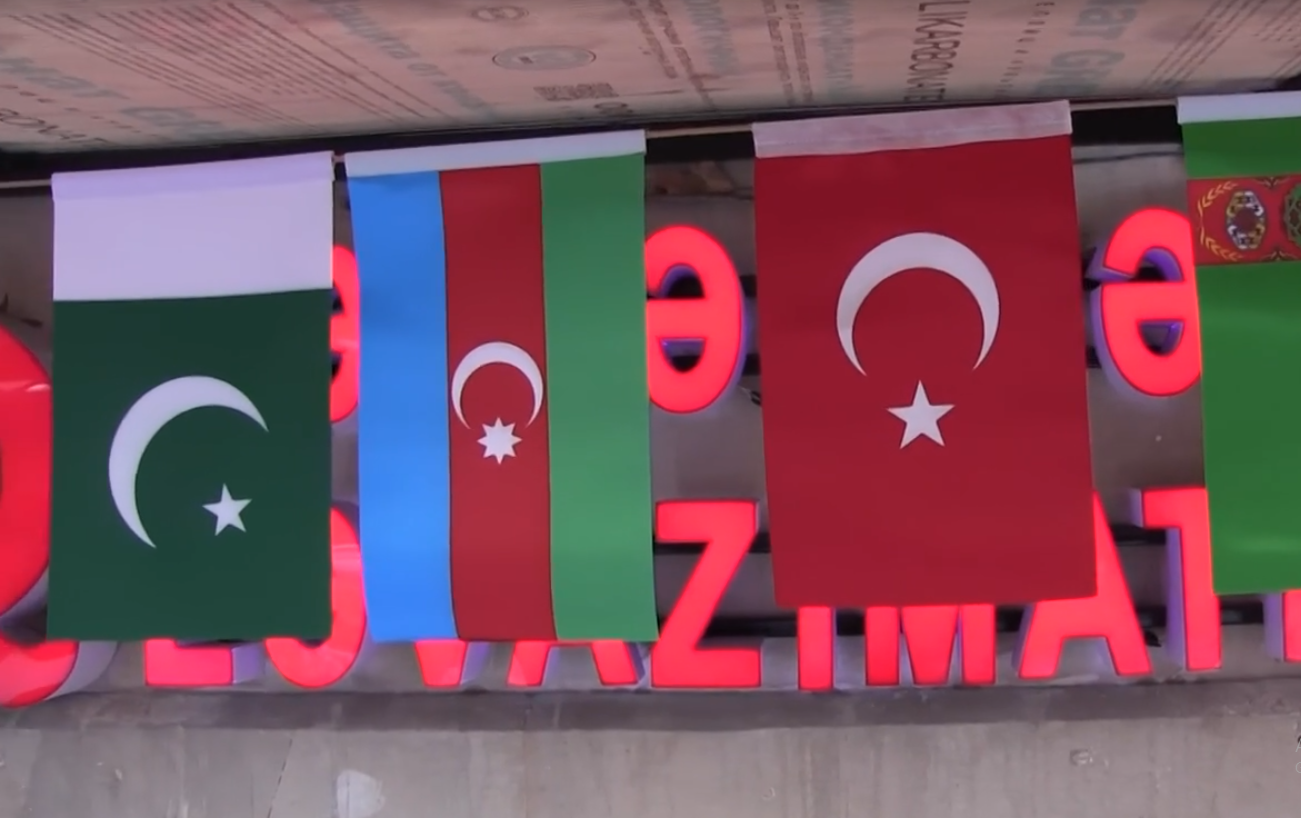
The flag of Pakistan with flags of Azerbaijan and Turkey.

Pakistan was the only country in the world that did not recognize Armenia as a country. Pakistan is one of few countries to recognize the Khojaly massacre, carried out by Armenia against Azerbaijanis as a genocide. Pakistan also supports Azerbaijan's side of the Nagorno-Karabakh conflict. In turn, Azerbaijan supports Pakistan's stance on Kashmir. The former president of Pakistan, Mamnoon Hussain also affirmed Pakistan's military support to Azerbaijan saying it was fully ready to equip the Azerbaijani military.

In April 1993, a meeting of the Security Council of the United Nations, led by Pakistan, was held. The resolution unanimously adopted resolution No. 822 concerning the Nagorno-Karabakh conflict.

In addition, Pakistan is a member of the Organisation of the Islamic Conference on Aggressive Measures of the Republic of Armenia, directed against Azerbaijan.

On September 16, 2022, when Ilham Aliyev and Shahbaz Sharif met in Samarkand, they expressed their satisfaction with the development of bilateral relations. During the meeting, Ilham Aliyev specifically noted Pakistan's non-recognition of Armenia as a state, as well as the cooperation of the two countries within the framework of the Non-Aligned Movement and the Organization of Islamic Cooperation.

== Humanitarian cooperation ==
Between 2012 and 2018 Heydar Aliyev Foundation on the basis of humanitarian cooperation aided to several local Pakistani social welfare institutions and charitable organizations such as Hamza Foundation, Khayber Eye Foundation. The Foundation also issued funds for the construction water supply scheme in Dera Ismail Khan District and arranged free treatment at different hospitals in Peshawar city. Moreover, the stipends of more than 30 deserving students of 12 Pakistani universities and the Rara Girls School are paid by the Heydar Aliyev Foundation. During the inauguration of the "20 January Martyrs Fountain" in Gujarkhan, Punjab province and 500 packages of blood were donated to the Thalassemia Center of Pakistan's Sweet Home (Bait-ul-Mal) organization.

On April 8, 2015, victims of flood disasters during the October month of 2014 in the rural areas of the various cities of Pakistan provided with humanitarian aids by Azerbaijan International Development Agency (AİDA).

== Cultural connections ==
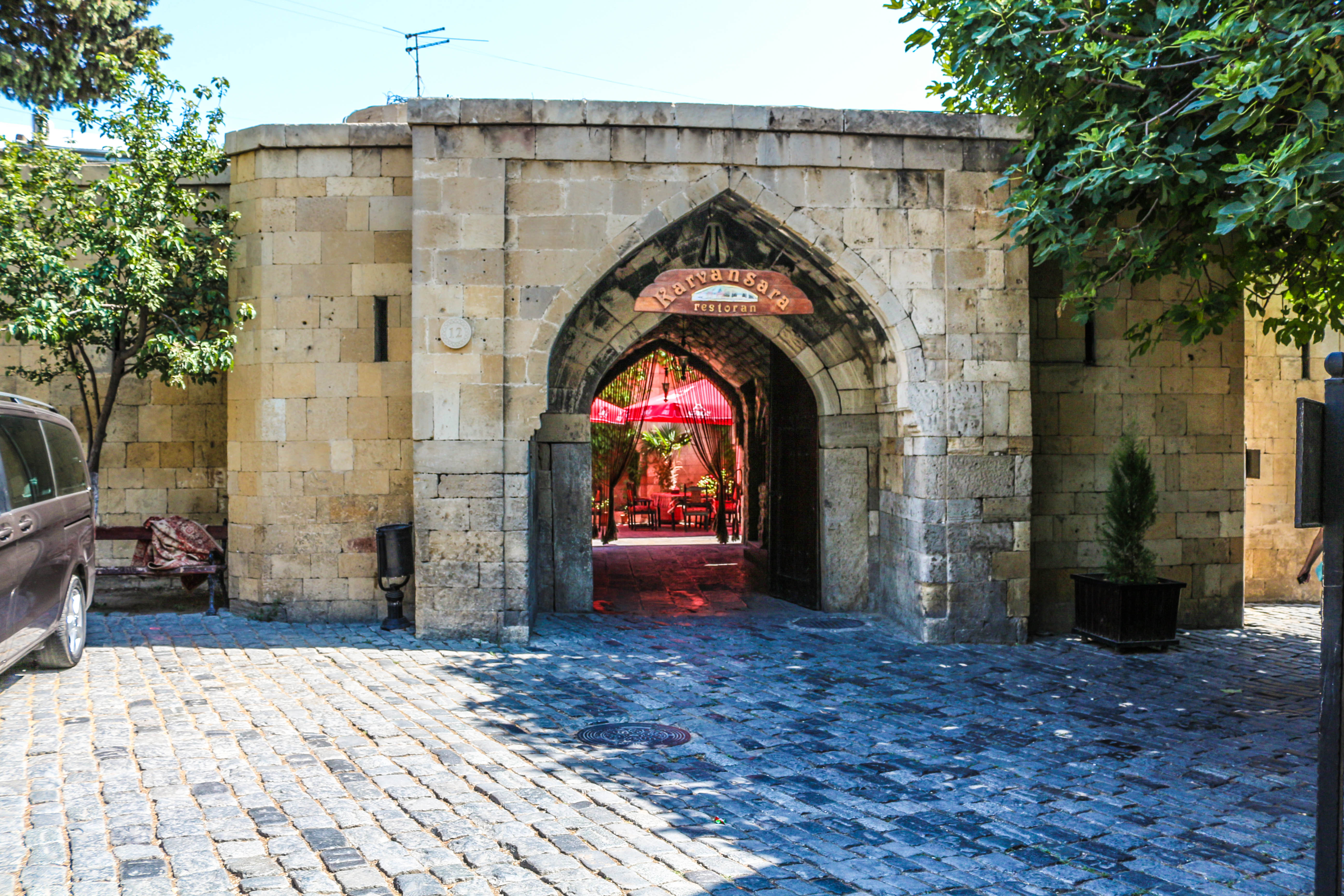
The 14th-century Multani Caravanserai in Baku, Azerbaijan, was built to house visiting Multani merchants in the city.

The relationship between Pakistan and Azerbaijan continues to develop in the religious and cultural spheres. There is a special branch of the language department at Baku State University specifically dedicated to the study of Urdu.

In the spring of 1996, the Joint Declaration on the twinning of the Azerbaijani city of Ganja with the Pakistani city of Multan was adopted. In 2004, in the city of Islamabad, in two languages – English and Urdu, the book "On the works of the prominent Azerbaijani thinker Jalil Mammadguluzadeh" was published.

In 2005, an earthquake occurred on the territory of Pakistan, in particular, in the city of Muzaffarabad. Azerbaijan, led by Ilham Aliyev, rendered assistance to the affected country by a material amount of one and a half million dollars. On the initiative of the chairman of the Heydar Aliyev Foundation, in the rural area of Rara, in the city of Muzaffarabad, construction of a secondary school on a modern model had begun. Its grand opening was held in February 2008. The Fund also allocated funds for the construction of a new block of the medical clinic of the Khyber Eye Foundation in Peshawar.

In 2025, Pakistan and Azerbaijan strengthened bilateral cooperation in areas including trade, energy, culture and tourism, building on growing travel links between the two countries. In 2024, approximately 80,924 Pakistani visitors travelled to Azerbaijan, an increase of about 47 % compared with 2023, while by the first nine months of 2025 over 66,000 Pakistanis had visited, marking continued growth in tourism flows. Pakistani arrivals have increased substantially from around 46,586 in 2019, reflecting a rising interest in Azerbaijan as a destination for leisure and business travel. Azerbaijan’s visa facilitation initiatives, including the ASAN Visa programme, have been noted for helping boost tourist numbers by making travel easier for Pakistani nationals.

== Resident diplomatic missions ==
- Azerbaijan has an embassy in Islamabad.
- Pakistan has an embassy in Baku.

== See also ==
- Foreign relations of Azerbaijan
- Foreign relations of Pakistan
- Armenia–Pakistan relations
- Pakistan–Turkey relations
