= Sanqaçal =

Sangachal
- Municipality
- Azerbaijani: Səngəçal
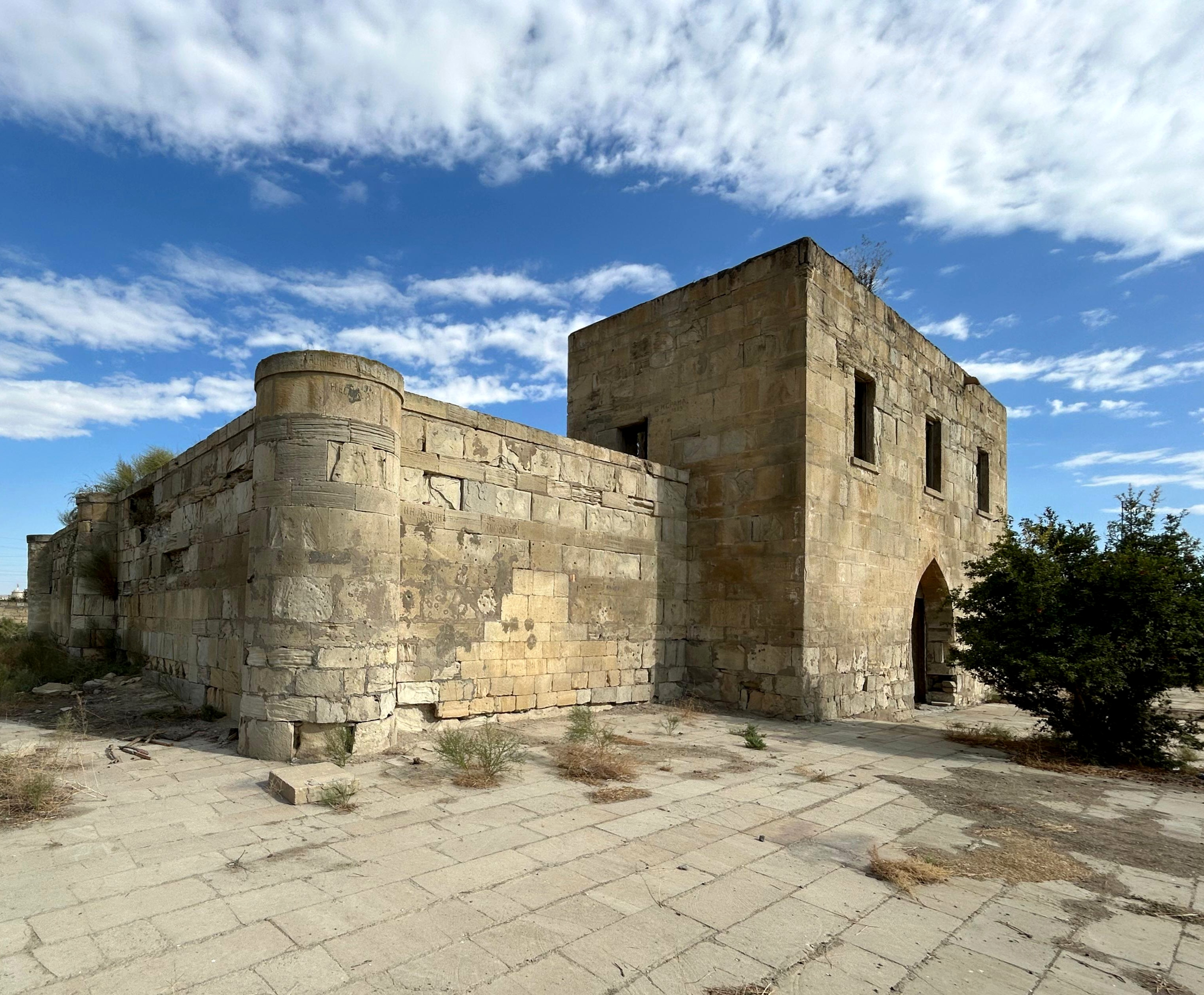
- Sangachal caravanserai

- Location within Azerbaijan
- Coordinates: 40°10′10″N 49°27′30″E
- Country: Azerbaijan
- City: Baku
- Raion: Garadagh

Population
  - Total: 4,108
- Time zone: UTC+4 (AZT)
  - Summer (DST): UTC+5 (AZT)

Sanqaçal (also, Səngəçal and Sangachal) is a settlement and municipality in Baku, Azerbaijan. It has a population of 4,108.

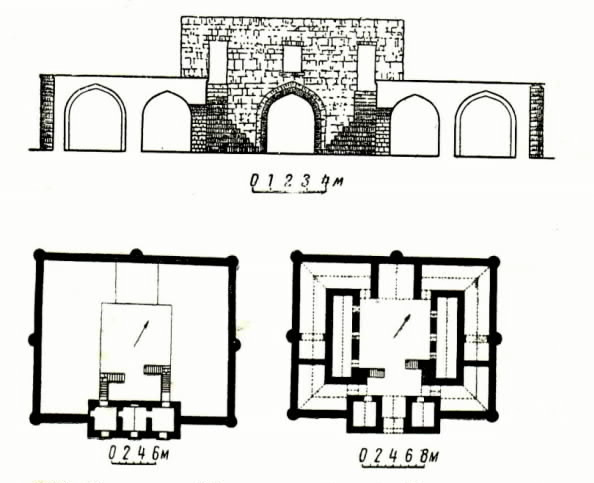
Plan of a historic caravanserai in the neighborhood

== Economy ==
The settlement is home to Sangachal Terminal. The terminal receives oil from the Azeri-Chirag-Guneshli field and natural gas from the Shah Deniz gas field. The oil is exported via the Baku-Tbilisi-Ceyhan pipeline to Turkey's Mediterranean coast and via the Baku-Supsa Pipeline and the Baku-Novorossiysk Pipeline to the Black Sea coast.

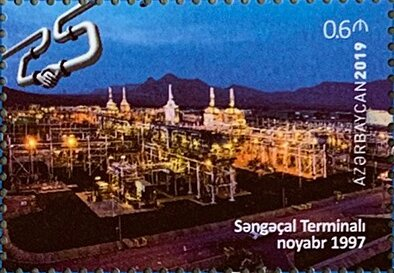
Stamp of Azerbaijan - 2019 - Sangachal Oil Terminal
