= Bukhara Caravanserai =

Caravenserai in Baku, Azerbaijan

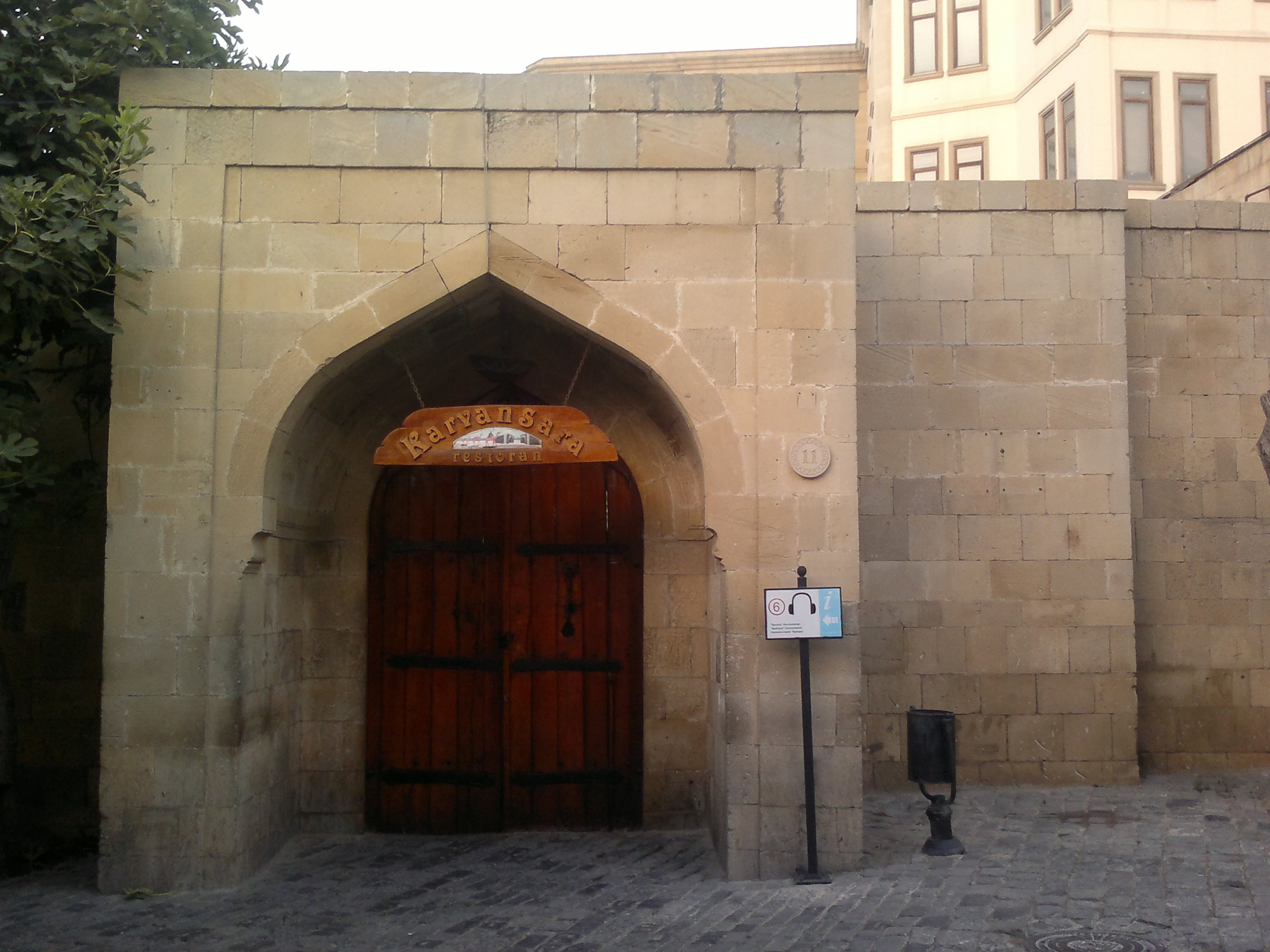
Bukhara Caravanserai

Bukhara Caravanserai is a caravanserai located in Baku, Azerbaijan. It was erected in the late 15th century over a trade route passing through the Shamakhi Gates of the fortress. It is located in the Icherisheher old town, opposite the Multani Caravanserai, and close to the Maiden Tower. The caravanserai was harnessed as a hotel, basically catering to merchants of Central Asia.

The shape of the caravanserai building is square and surrounded by balconies and cells, and the portal is convex. The caravanserai has an octagonal courtyard as well as. The bulk of the architectural composition of the caravanserai has been formed by various arches situated around the inner courtyard.

In the year of 1964, the Bukhara Caravanserai underwent restoration works and as a result of this process, the caravanserai building was separated from its annexes built earlier, which made available to see the national monument in the background of the surrounding buildings.

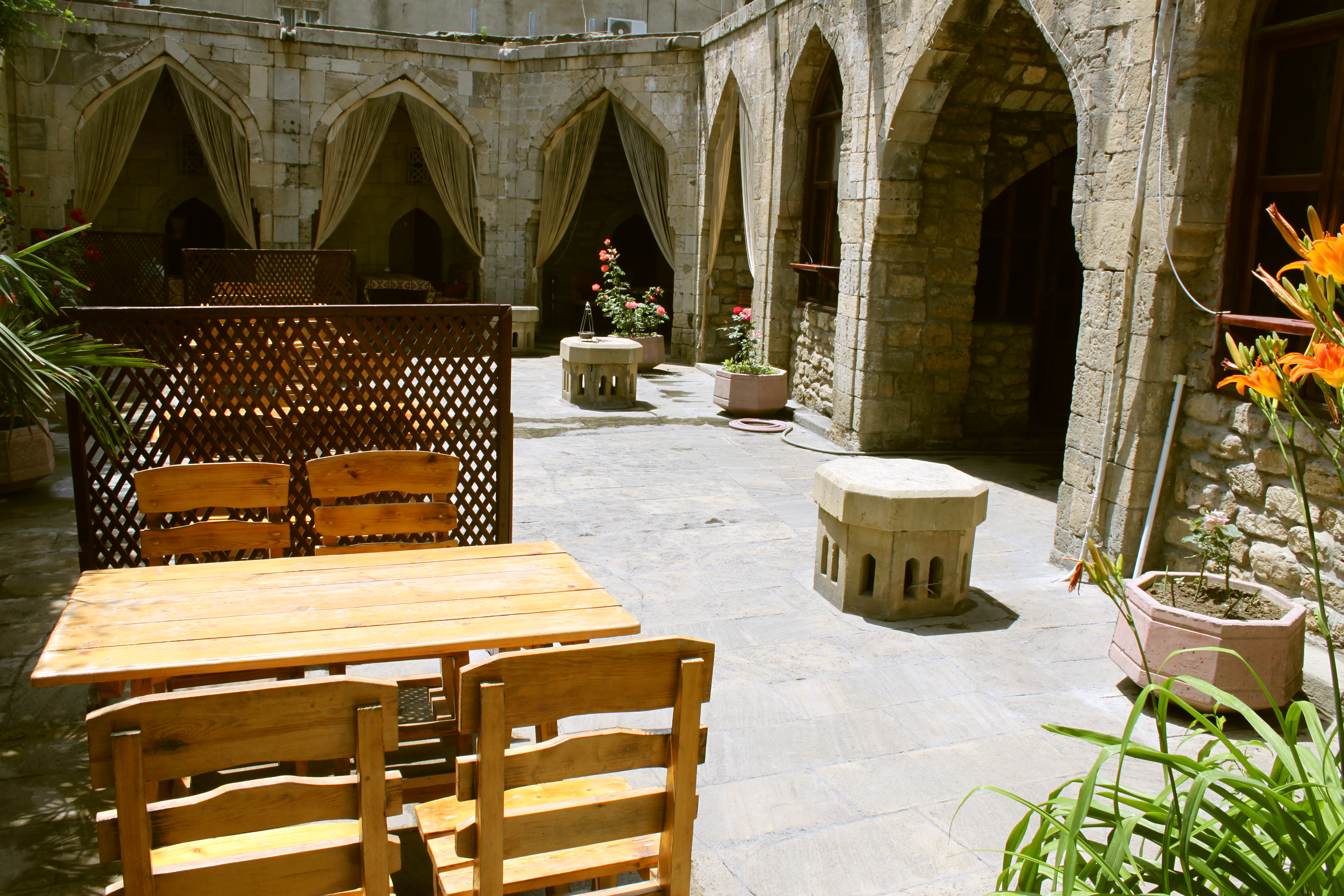
Restaurant in the caravanserai

The caravanserai building houses a restaurant which serves Azerbaijan national cuisine.
