= Multani Caravanserai =

14th-century caravanserai in Azerbaijan

Coordinates: 40.3667°N 49.8373°E

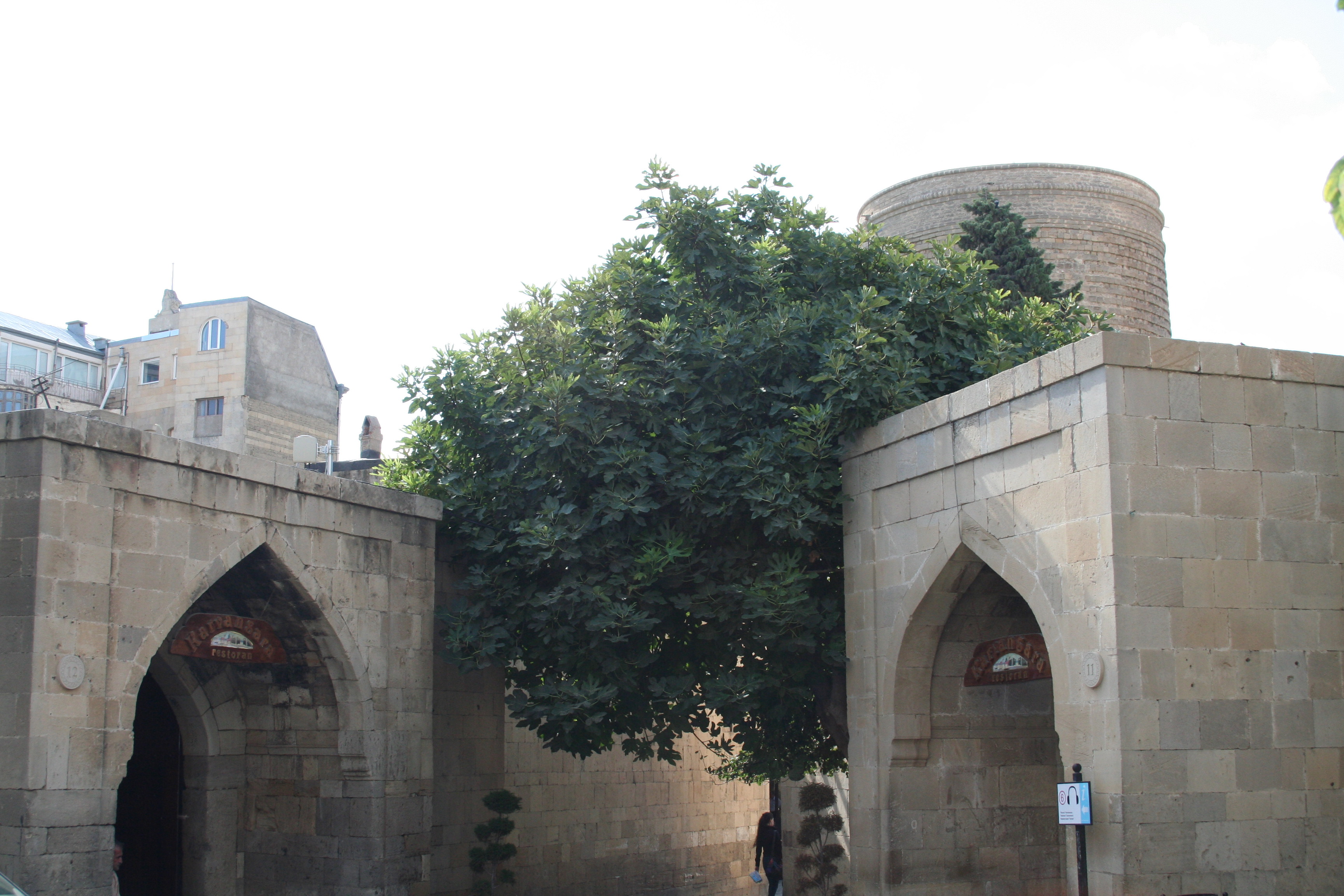
Multani Caravanserai and Bukhara Caravanserai

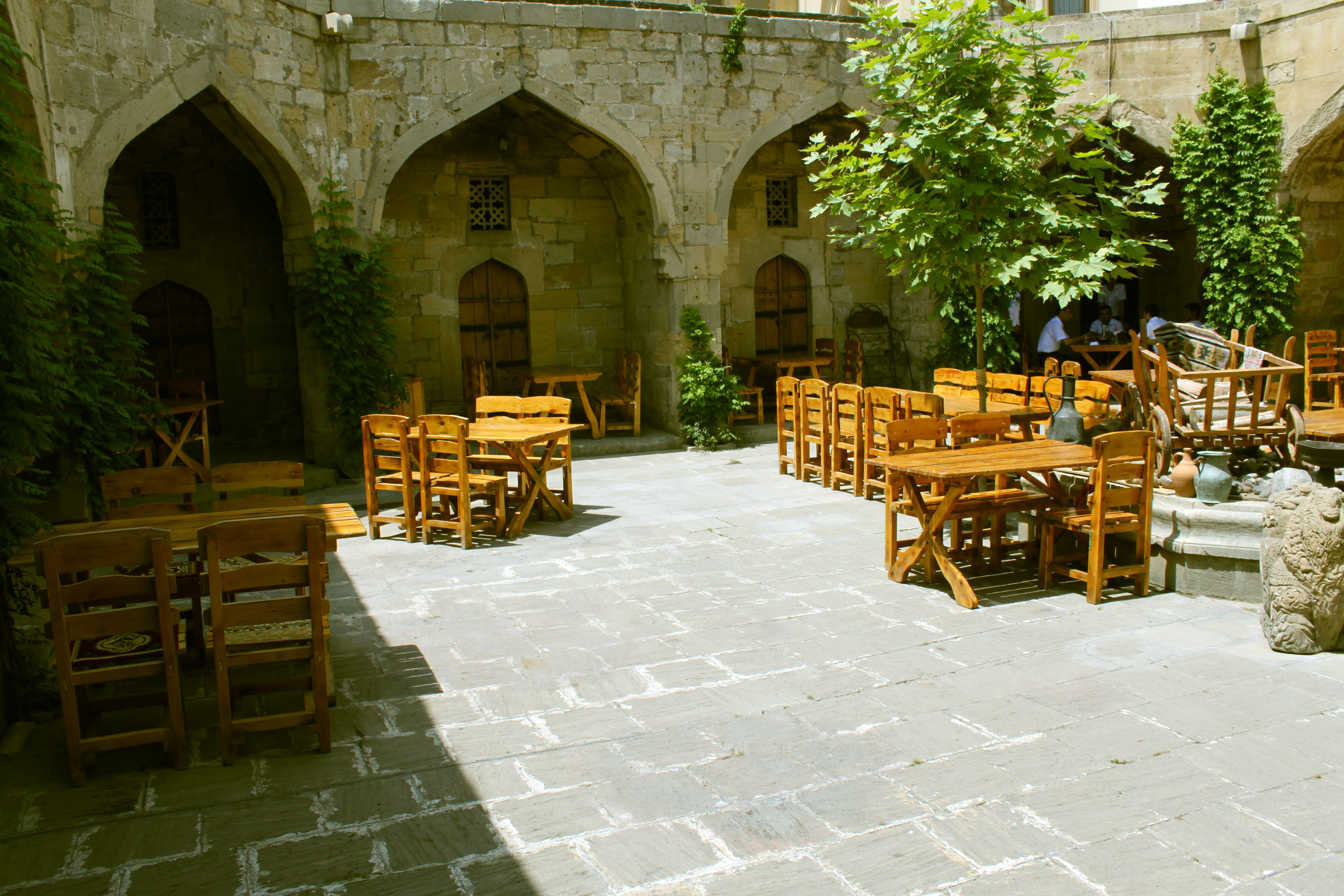
Multani Caravanserai

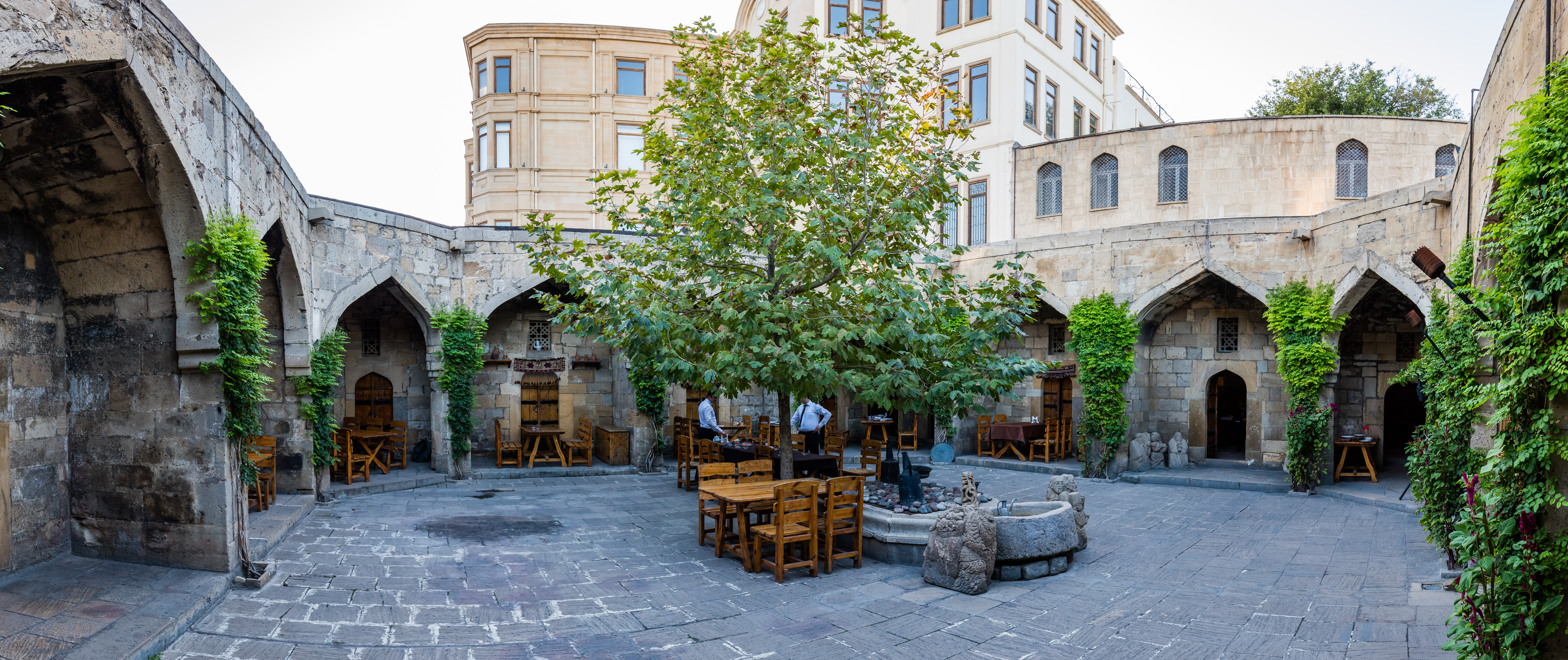
A restaurant in the caravanserai

The Multani Caravanserai is a caravanserai located in Baku, Azerbaijan. It was established in the 14th century and is located in the Icherisheher old town, opposite the Bukhara Caravanserai.

The caravanserai was built to house merchants from the medieval city of Multan (now in Punjab, Pakistan) who frequented the region for trade, and used this caravanserai as a stop. They included Zoroastrians, who are also believed to have erected the Ateshgah Temple in Surakhani.

The caravanserai has a square shape and the construction of the building is in an ancient style. There are many balconies around the courtyard. Now the Multani Caravanserai houses a restaurant of Azerbaijani cuisine. In 2020, restoration works were commenced on the site with a completion time of 2022.

The caravanserai has been linked to the historical relationship between Azerbaijan and Pakistan.
